= Pennsylvania Avenue-West Side Historic District =

NRHP-listed site in Chehalis, Washington

- U.S. National Register of Historic Places
- U.S. Historic district
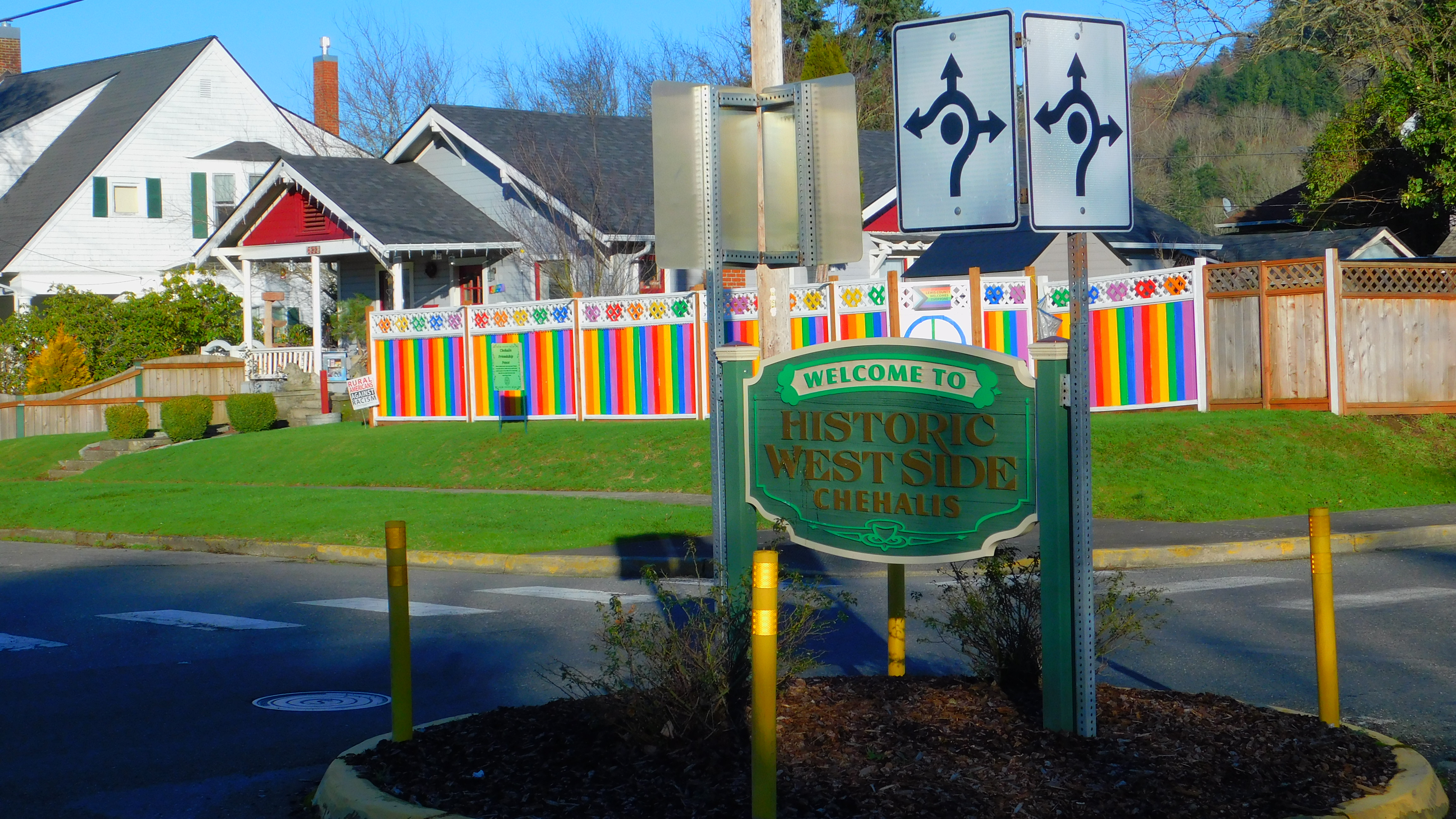
- Roundabout and Friendship Fence, Pennsylvania-West Side Historic District in Chehalis, Washington

- Location within Washington (state)
- Location: 600 block NW. St. Helens Avenue and 440-723 Pennsylvania Avenue, Chehalis, Washington
- Coordinates: 46°39′49″N 122°57′52″W
- Area: 13 acres (5.3 ha)
- Architect: Various including Jacque DeForest Griffin
- Architectural style: Late 19th And 20th Century Revivals, Bungalow/craftsman, Late Victorian
- MPS: Chehalis MPS
- NRHP reference No.: 91001721
- Added to NRHP: December 3, 1991

The Pennsylvania Avenue-West Side Historic District is a neighborhood located in Chehalis, Washington and is listed on the National Register of Historic Places (NRHP) since 1991. The district is one of three NRHP neighborhoods in the city, including the Chehalis Downtown Historic District and the Hillside Historic District. The city of Chehalis recognizes a much broader and expansive historic district, known under such monikers as the Historic West Side or the Westside neighborhood, with the inclusion of several other homes and streets.

The neighborhood began in the 1880s and was mostly built up by 1915. Early, prominent members of the Chehalis community platted, built, and resided in the historic district. Residences were constructed in a variety of architectural styles with American Foursquare, Craftsman, and Late-Victorian the most numerous or notable of homes. The area is known for its ornamental street lamps, first installed in 1929.

The district was once home to the West Side School, which was destroyed in an earthquake in 1949, and is home to Westside Park. The O. K. Palmer House, an NRHP-listed home, is located within the Pennsylvania Avenue-West Side Historic District.

== History ==
The Pennsylvania Avenue-West Side Historic District was originally owned by several prominent members of the Chehalis Land & Timber Company (CL&T), including the Coffman and Donahoe families, Daniel Millett of Millett Field, Chehalis civil servant William Muir Urquhart, and William West, namesake of W. F. West High School. West, along with the CL&T, platted the area between 1888 and 1906 and the NRHP neighborhood was considered mostly complete by 1915.

By the 1900s, the district was already regarded by residents as the "fashionable avenue par excellence" of the city. The neighborhood was of such architectural and social importance to the community that the Chehalis Bee-Nugget newspaper in 1915 printed a book-length commemorative photograph issue to showcase the district. A 1920s program by the city's Better Home Premises committee, which awarded residences for beautiful lawns, mentioned the Pennsylvania-West Side area's abundant lots and specifically noted several homes in the district. The first official grand prize went to the Schuss Home on Pennsylvania Avenue.

The first recognized hospital in Chehalis was built by Dr. Guy W. Kennicott in 1903 at Prindle and State in the expanded city definition of the district. During the early morning hours on August 9, 1952, a fire broke out at the shake-and-shingle Perma Products plant north of the district boundaries on Pennsylvania Avenue, destroying the manufacturing plant. The $750,000 loss began after an electrical spark ignited a tank of naphtha, causing an immediate explosion. The blaze did not spread and there was no reported loss of life.

The heavily-used intersection of West and Pennsylvania marks the district but did not contain any type of traffic stop until the installation of a four-way stop in 1954. Continuing safety concerns led to the addition of street markings and larger stop signs in 1974. A traffic calming roundabout was added to the junction in 2007. Constructed also as a means to highlight the historic area, the space contained a welcome sign to the neighborhood that was funded by efforts of the Westside Chehalis Neighborhood Association. The sign was destroyed in a hit-and-run incident in December 2023 but a metal replacement marker was added in September 2024.

=== Infrastructure history ===
Infrastructure improvements in the district included the first sewer installation, a stoneware pipe system, in 1900. Additional sewer lines were added beginning in 1973.

Pennsylvania Avenue was a plank road at the time and was replanked in 1901. In 1907, the Chehalis Citizen's Club led efforts to grade and lay down a crushed rock roadway in parts of the district. Plans in 1913 to pave the Westside included the additions of a center parking strip to Pennsylvania Avenue. Despite protests from district homeowners over costs and size of the new roads, the streets in the district were completely paved, either by asphalt or concrete, by 1914. West Street was repaved with a concrete base and curbing in 1925.

Early sidewalks were considered to be in poor shape by 1901, leading to several repairs ordered by the city or undertaken by residents in the district. By city ordinance, bicyclists at the time could be fined between $1 and $25 if caught riding on the sidewalks in the district at too high a speed or if West Side School was in session. A sidewalk connecting the district to the Northern Pacific Depot was undertaken in 1909. Sidewalk improvements were ordered again in 1922 and 1924.

== Geography ==
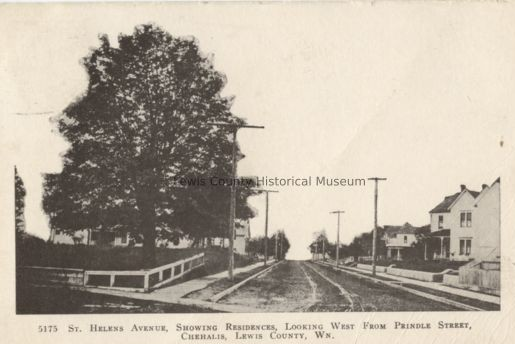
St. Helens Avenue, ca. 1910

The NRHP district is considered residential and is located due west of the Chehalis Downtown Historic District and east of Interstate 5. Encompassing three blocks on Pennsylvania Avenue, the district also incorporates the 600 block on NW St. Helens Avenue, two recognized homes on Gertrude Street, and one property each on Quincy Place and West Street. The neighborhood is bordered directly east of Westside Park and within the confines of the Pennsylvania-Westside District is the O. K. Palmer House, an NRHP-listed site. Into the 1920s, the district bordered a small lake located behind the West Side School; the body of water was proposed to be used as a town landfill in 1922.

The city of Chehalis has an expanded district boundary usually referred to as the Historic West Side or as the Westside district or neighborhood. The city defined district includes homes to the western border at the interstate and south to Prindle Street. The northern limit expands beyond Vine Street and meanders east to Rhode Island Place and up to State Avenue.

== Features ==
Most of the significant properties recognized by the NRHP are located on the west side of Pennsylvania Avenue and are distinguished by large, ornate homes built on spacious properties, some recognized for their detailed landscaping. The expansive residences and substantial property are markedly different than the surrounding neighborhood which are often smaller in scale. The contrast is most notable on Prindle Street, which borders the Pennsylvania-West Side neighborhood. Prindle contains mill worker cottages that housed early working-class families in the city.

The district is notable for its street lamps. An extensive network of lamp posts were added beginning in 1929. In 1969, after the lights suffered a wire issue leading to a neighborhood blackout of the lamp posts, the city reported the system to be "deteriorated beyond repair". Residents unanimously approved of keeping all 48 ornamental lights and several fixes were undertaken via a local improvement district, temporarily installing mercury-vapor lamps until repairs were completed. By the turn of the 21st century, most of the lamp posts were again inoperable and in need of refurbishing but renovations and maintenance to repair the lighting was begun via fundraising in 2002.

Homes within the NRHP district combine a variety of styles, including American Foursquare and Craftsman bungalow, with a majority being American Craftsman. Several homes of note were built under a transitional Late-Victorian style and two homes are classified as being 1920s Revivalism. The dominating, larger homes are often two or more stories, with 1 1/2 story houses, usually of cottage and bungalow classifications, filling out the rest of the neighborhood. Most homes are built on brick or stone foundations and all dwellings are constructed with wood-framing and contain touches of the era. These include various types of siding such as clapboard, drop, and/or shingle and architectural features such as dominant roofs, brick and masonry chimneys, gables, front-entry and wrap-around porches, and extended eaves; bracketing and vergeboards are common. While many homes contain ornate touches of the early 20th century, including interior examples such as ornamented fireplaces, exposed purlins and rafters, original cabinetry, and wainscotting, simplicity exists in most homes, especially in regards to such areas as casements and porch columns and railings.

== Significance ==
The Pennsylvania Avenue-West Side Historic District was added to the National Register of Historic Places (NRHP) on December 3, 1991 and the nomination included 31 homes and 20 garages in the district, though 5 additional buildings were excluded either due to alterations or age that did not meet NRHP requirements. One of the recognized homes had been converted into an apartment house but allowed as the building kept its original style. The houses selected for inclusion were noted for a variety of styles, such as American Craftsman and Bungalow, Victorian, and turn-of-the-century revival styles. Some outbuildings, such as garages, were included as the construction often mirrored the form, use of materials, and details of the main house.

Due to the mostly untouched nature of the neighborhood, the NRHP listing considered the homes in the district to retain "considerable integrity from the historic period" and contain visible, and original, historic architectural features, such as exterior details, layouts, roof lines, and window casements.

The area was also recognized as of historic significance due to the number of early 20th century businessmen, investors, and civil servants who helped to shape the early days of Chehalis. Such notable pioneers include John Dobson, a banker and mayor of the city, and Francis Donahoe, a real estate investor also credited with early platting in the district. A section of Pennsylvania Avenue in the 1900s contained a row of homes owned by members of the Coffman, Frost, Millett, and Urquhart families. Families of the early founders of the Pennsylvania neighborhood continued to live in the district for decades.

The district was listed with the Washington State Department of Archaeology and Historic Preservation (DAHP) as a protected and historic area within the state. By 1996, the Pennsylvania-Westside neighborhood was one of only 20 to 30 such areas in the state, and the only one in Lewis County.

In 1999, residents of the district formed a non-profit group known as the Westside Chehalis Neighborhood Association, focusing on protecting historic Pennsylvania-West Side. The effort was spurred by an attempted rezoning in the district and a potentially intrusive widening project of Interstate 5. A 1987 environmental impact statement (EIS) regarding I-5 took into account Chehalis Westside properties near the interstate margins. The EIS found that homes, especially on Maryland Avenue which borders I-5, were architectural examples seen throughout the district. The structures and their history, however, were found to be lacking in several historical aspects, including ties to historical events and people, and were found to have insufficient "high artistic value" and connections to known architects.

== Significant contributing properties ==
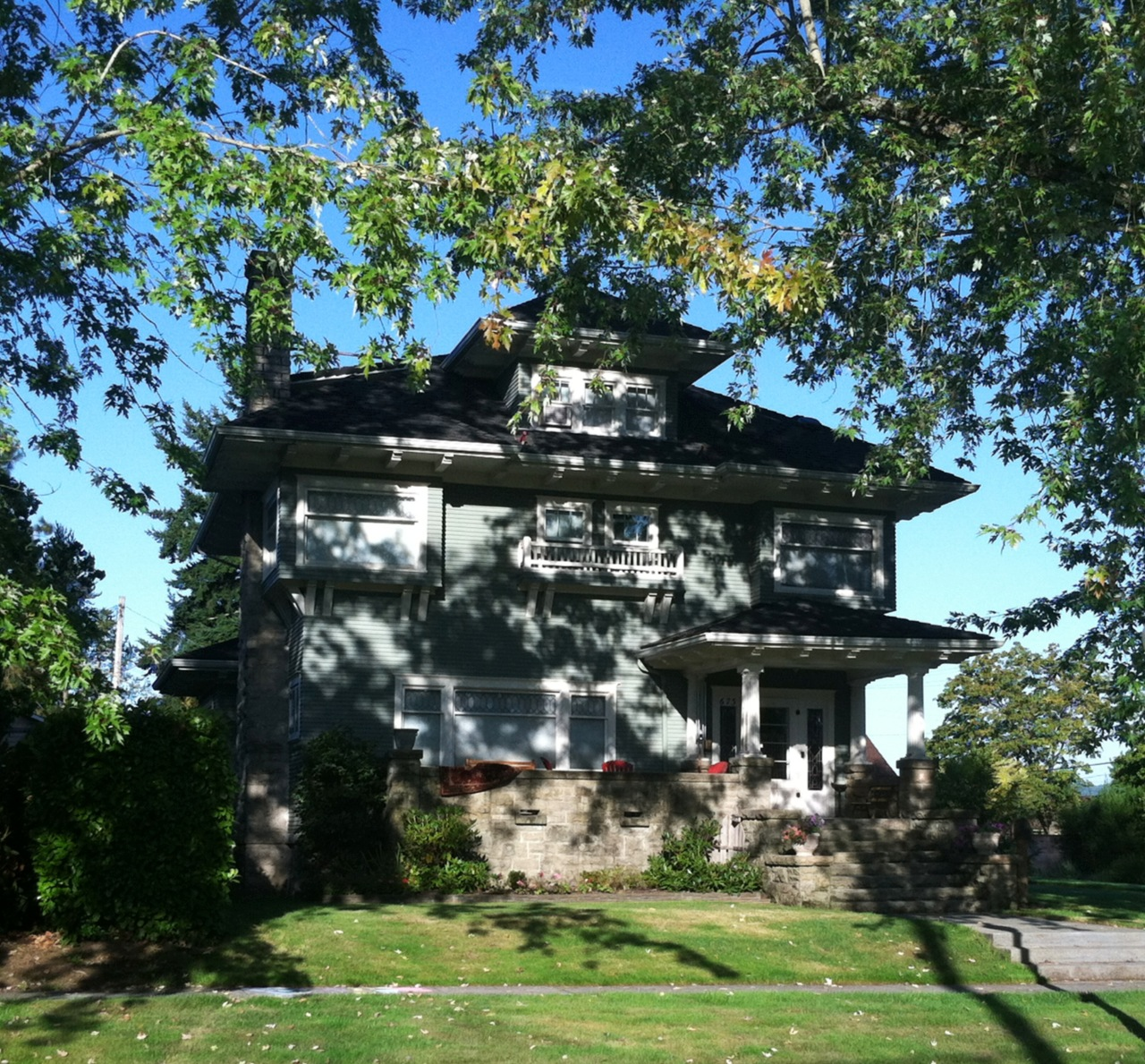
O.K. Palmer House

Unless otherwise noted, the details provided are based on the 1991 National Register of Historic Places (NRHP) nomination form and may not reflect updates or changes to the Pennsylvania Avenue-West Side Historic District in the interim. Additionally, during the NRHP nomination process, many homes were found to lack documentation for exact construction dates though research was able to narrow down to certain timeframes, using Sanborn maps and referencing city directories to verify ownership or occupancy. Listed dates of construction for several homes are approximate.

=== American Foursquare ===
The cubist-style American Foursquare home is exemplified by the Osmer K. Palmer House at 673 NW Pennsylvania Avenue. Itself an NRHP-listed home, the house is a massive, boxy footprint and contains several distinct roof and window features. Another foursquare on the 600 block of Pennsylvania is the William Brunswig House, owned by the proprietor of the Brunswig Grand Opera House. The dwelling is highlighted by its windows, hip roof, and front entry and porch.

=== Colonial Revival ===
An architectural continuation of American Foursquare, the best example of the Colonial Revival style is the Abraham L. Coffman House at 565 NW Pennsylvania Avenue. Built by Augustine Donahoe, the 40 foot (12 metres) symmetrical home was begun to be constructed in 1903 and finished by 1907, (Note: The Donahoe/Coffman House at 565 NW Pennsylvania Avenue is listed as being constructed in 1908 in the NRHP listing.) and was originally planned to contain 4 bedrooms and a basement. It features a pediment and Tuscan column front porch. A.L. Coffman purchased the residence from Donahoe in 1907 for $10,000. A gambrel roof dwelling known as the John Denhof House also follows Colonial Revival architecture. Situated at 565 NW Pennsylvania, it contains cornice returns, gable dormers, and a mixed shingle and clapboard exterior. The property once contained a previous home owned by Denhof, which was moved after he sold it in 1907 to build the newer structure. A two-story Colonial Revival home built by Denhof resides at 584 Pennsylvania and is known for its massive gambrel roofline.

=== Craftsman and Craftsman bungalow ===
The most popular style in the district, a prime example of the Craftsman architectural movement is the Edgar A. Frost House located at 461 Pennsylvania Avenue. The two-story home, built beginning in 1906, includes intersecting gables with ornamentation, a sheltered front porch, and banded windows. The garage is built in the same style. The Alonzo E. Rice House, which includes a veranda and decorated gables, is located at 682 NW St. Helens Avenue. The 2 1/2 John Loughran House at 621 NW Quincy Place features a shingle and clapboard exterior with a sandstone chimney. The house of noted pioneer Daniel Millett, at 495 NW Pennsylvania, is one of the more elaborate Craftsman homes in the district, containing a hip roof with additional features similar to that of Prairie School architecture. A modest Craftsman, unnamed but located at 637 NW St. Helens, is an overall example of the style, encompassing the uses of a broad porch, roof braces and rafters, and multiple-light banded windows.

Bungalows are pervasive in the district with examples including the John Miles-Alanson A. Hull House at 666 NW St. Helens. The home contains the essential characteristics and details of the Craftsman bungalow style, with a gable structure, overhanding eaves, a broad front porch, and a large dormer window. A bungalow-cottage, with a matching garage, known as the Gus Thracker House is situated at 640 Pennsylvania and features motifs in the Colonial Revival style, including Tuscan columns, a boxed cornice, and a decorative frieze. It was estimated to have been built between 1896 and 1905. The John B. Coffman House is the largest bungalow in the district and also one of the last of its style to be built. The 1 1/2 story home located at 761 NW West Street features several roof forms, including jerkinhead, over projecting wings of the house.

Several homes in the district were built by the Coffman family. The Daniel Coffman House at 647 NW St. Helens is considered one of the best examples of a Craftsman bungalow in the district. Built circa 1905 to 1912, the residence features a low-pitched gable roofline with several small dormer windows, and contains a deep and expansive front porch. Located on the property is the Coffman Barn, built and owned by Noah B. Coffman, a prominent Chehalis businessman in the late 19th and early 20th centuries. The round, three-level structure was built beginning approximately in 1902 and was noted for its engineering in regards to sanitation, including its sewer and air flow systems. Measuring 40 feet (12.2 m) in diameter and 45 feet (13.7 m) tall, it was constructed for multiple use as a dairy barn, a stable, and as a garage for early motor carriages. The barn once contained a hayloft and silo. The site also contains a basement and additional cellar which were purposed for dairy production. The domed roof holds several dormers and cupola. As of 2024, the building is one of 14 round barns existing in the state, and the only one residing in an NRHP-listed district.

The George L. and Lillian Marsh at 723 Pennsylvania, the youngest home recognized in the district, was built in 1929. The two-story Craftsman, with garage, rests on a rectangular footprint and is noted for its windows. George Marsh was a prominent timber and sawmill proprietor. Due to its columned entrance, the residence is also considered to be Colonial Revival.

Several other Craftsman and Craftsman bungalow homes on Pennsylvania Avenue are listed on the NRHP. In the 400 block is the Herbert Sieler House, built after 1916, that sits at the entrance of the district. In the 500 block are the homes of Andrew Bickford, built between 1905 and 1912, and known for its windows and porch, and a two-story house with garage owned by James Urquhart, son of William, that was constructed during 1905 and 1912.

Three Craftsman and bungalow-style homes are located on the 600 block. A one-story bungalow and garage, built between 1916 and 1924, features decorative vergeboards and drop siding. An unaltered, cottage-style bungalow and garage of city treasurer and prominent lumberman Frank J. Allen and his wife Ethel was built as early as 1908. (Note: The Fred J. Allen home is also recorded as being built between 1912 and 1915.) The residence contains original double-hung windows and corner front porch. A 1 1/2 story Craftsman known as the Edmund Duffield-Charles Mitchell House and garage was built during a similar timeframe that features shed roof dormers. The 700 block of Pennsylvania Avenue contains a one-story bungalow with a gable entry front porch.

Additional Craftsman-style homes on St. Helens Avenue include the ornamental 1 1/2 gabled residence of Edward Whitmarsh, president of the Chehalis Mattress Factory, which was built in the mid-1910s and a two-story Craftsman owned by William West owned home built between 1905 and 1912 known for its triple-panel second-floor window and expansive hip roof front porch.

=== Late-Victorian ===
The best example of Late-Victorian architecture in the district is the New World Queen Anne Revival architecture-styled William West House at 554 NW Pennsylvania Avenue. Built by West in the 1890s, the house, along with the dwelling of Dr. Henri Pettit at 649 NW Pennsylvania, features distinct Victorian flourishes, including asymmetry, projecting building elements, and a variety of rooflines and ornamentation. The restrained Late-Victorian style is more noticeable at the Noah Coffman House at 675 NW St. Helens Avenue, where the building is more symmetrical and organized despite the various bays and roof styles. The home, built in 1884 and considered the second oldest residence in the city after the O. B. McFadden House, (Note: A large discrepancy on the year the Noah Coffman House at 675 NW St. Helens Avenue was built exists between local reporting and the NRHP listing, which mentions the construction in approximately 1918.) shared the round carriage barn of the next door Daniel Coffman House.

Other Late-Victorian homes located in the 400-500 block of Pennsylvania Avenue include two 1 1/2 story, pre-1896 constructed homes, an unnamed cottage featuring a matching garage and a Queen Anne-style 1 1/2 story, double-gabled winged house with ornate bargeboards and a wrapping veranda. A larger 2 1/2 story home, and a garage, built by George Bingham in 1892 and owned by William West resides at 554 Pennsylvania and contains numerous decorations, a curved veranda, and distinct architectural details including a central hip roof and gable wings.

=== Period Revival ===
Two homes contain the architectural style of 1920s Period Revivalism. The home of most note is the Jacque "Jack" DeForest Griffin-designed dwelling located at 687 NW Gertrude Street. Known as the Carroll L. Brown House, it was built in 1926 and contains elements from English and French revival architecture. Two garages on the property are considered contributing buildings on the NRHP listing. The residence replaced the home of early Chehalis businessman, Frank Everett. Next door is an English Cottage-style residence known as the George and Hazel Sears House. Built as a wedding gift for their daughter, it was constructed in 1924 by Carroll Brown. The two-story home contains a steep pitched roof and is highlighted by pronounced gables and a front portico. George Sears was a prominent businessman and a city commissioner.

=== Non-contributing properties ===
A home owned by William Urquhart, built beginning in 1900, resides in the district at 525 NW Pennsylvania Avenue but due to its heavily modified nature, the home is not listed under the NRHP. Another home heavily modified and not included is a Craftsman home at 634 NW St. Helens, though the dwelling was renovated in the early 2000s closer to its original state.

Homes located outside of the NRHP boundary but located within the expanded Chehalis district is the Forney Home, located on Folsom Avenue and built in 1900. Measuring 3,700 square feet (340 m^{2}) with six bedrooms, the residence has remained in "near mint condition" and contains original carpentry. The French-style country home of early Chehalis lumber magnate Harrison B. Pearne was built in 1923 on Ohio Avenue. The residence contains over 300 windows from the original build. Several homes on Maryland Avenue, bordering the interstate, are mostly of various Craftsman construction and built around the turn of the 20th century. A simplified Queen Anne home built by at least 1908 resides on the street. Most homes on Maryland are modified, or considered lacking characteristics, for inclusion into a federal or state register.

=== Extinct homes ===
The Dewey Long House, built in 1889, was one of the earliest homes constructed in the neighborhood. Located at the intersection of New York and Folsom, the unoccupied residence was lost to a fire in February 1926.

== Chehalis Historic Preservation Commission ==
The district hosts several homes recognized by the Chehalis Historic Preservation Commission (CHPC). The commission recognizes historical value, and the subsequent preservation, of homes and buildings in the city. Buildings honored with the designation receive a brass plaque that denotes the year of construction and the name of either the architect or original owner of the home.

A two-story home located on Gertrude Street was given one of the earliest CHPC honors in the district in 1993 and the Fred Allen house was placed on the city register in 1994. Recognition by the commission was awarded in 2000 to the Noah Coffman House on St. Helens Avenue; the residence was restored beginning in 1992. The homes of George and Hazel Sears and George L. and Lillian Marsh were recognized by the CHPC in 2003.

== Artworks ==
At the intersection of Pennsylvania Avenue and West Street is a rainbow painted fence known as the Chehalis Friendship Fence. The artwork, located on a homeowner property, was first created in 2020 and is a show of support of LGBTQ+ people and their rights. The fence has been vandalized twice. The first occasion, done by unknown individuals, occurred in June 2023 during an overnight spree that targeted several other gay pride spots and groups in the city. The second act, occurring in February 2024, was done by three, non-Chehalis individuals with connections to hate groups. The perpetrators splashed the artwork with black paint but did not finish the destruction after being spotted by a neighbor who chased them down in a vehicular pursuit. Found guilty of misdemeanor malicious mischief, the trio were acquitted by jury on hate crime charges. In both instances, neighbors and volunteers helped to repaint and repair the fence.

A mural, located at the United Natural Foods plant between Pennsylvania Avenue-West Side and the Chehalis Downtown Historic District, is known as Lewis County’s Legacy in Agriculture. The painting, which highlights the history of crops and farming in the city, was completed in 2022.

== Tourism ==
Maintaining the historic aspects of the district, as well as the planning of celebratory events, has been overseen by a volunteer organization known as the Westside Chehalis Neighborhood Association (WCNA). From 1999 to 2004, the WCNA held a candlelight walking event known as the Holiday Home Tour in the district usually during early December. The tour has been briefly revived at times, including in 2010. Several homes were open to the public during the tour and visitors provided with holiday-themed foods and entertained with various forms of live music.

== Westside Park ==
Due to the 1910 fire at the West Side School, the Westside Park could not be included in the NRHP designation due to a loss of paperwork necessary for historical evaluation.

== West Side School ==
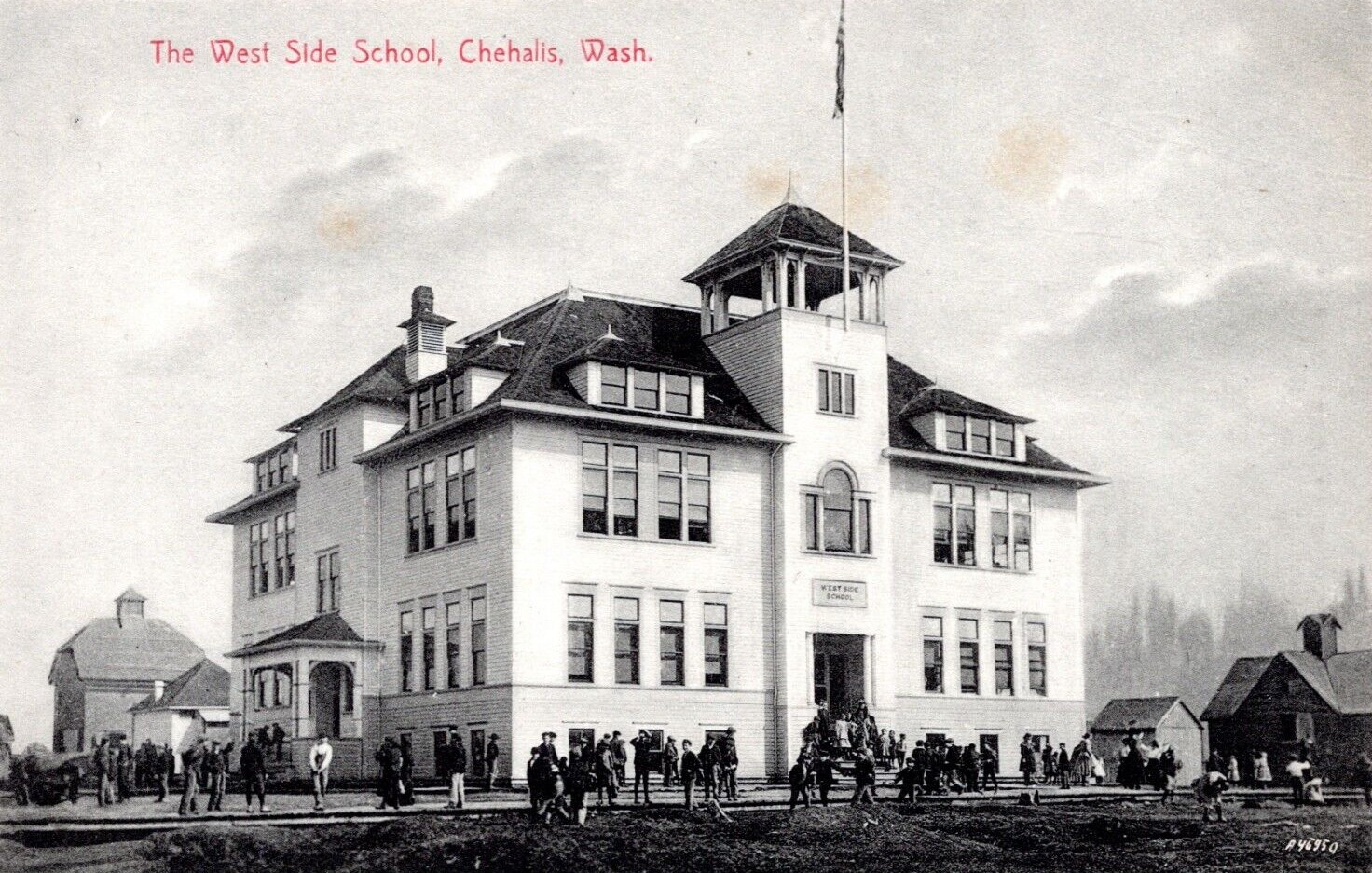
West Side School, pre-1910

The district, before its NRHP designation, was home to the West Side School that was first built at a cost of $7,500 in 1894 on property owned by Daniel Millett. The schoolhouse was located originally on the south side of West Street between New York and Ohio avenues on the site of Westside Park. The public grade school was noted for the loss of its well-respected principal, Ira (Asa) Whittaker, who died during the 1908 school year after accidentally shooting himself during a hunting trip to Klaber.

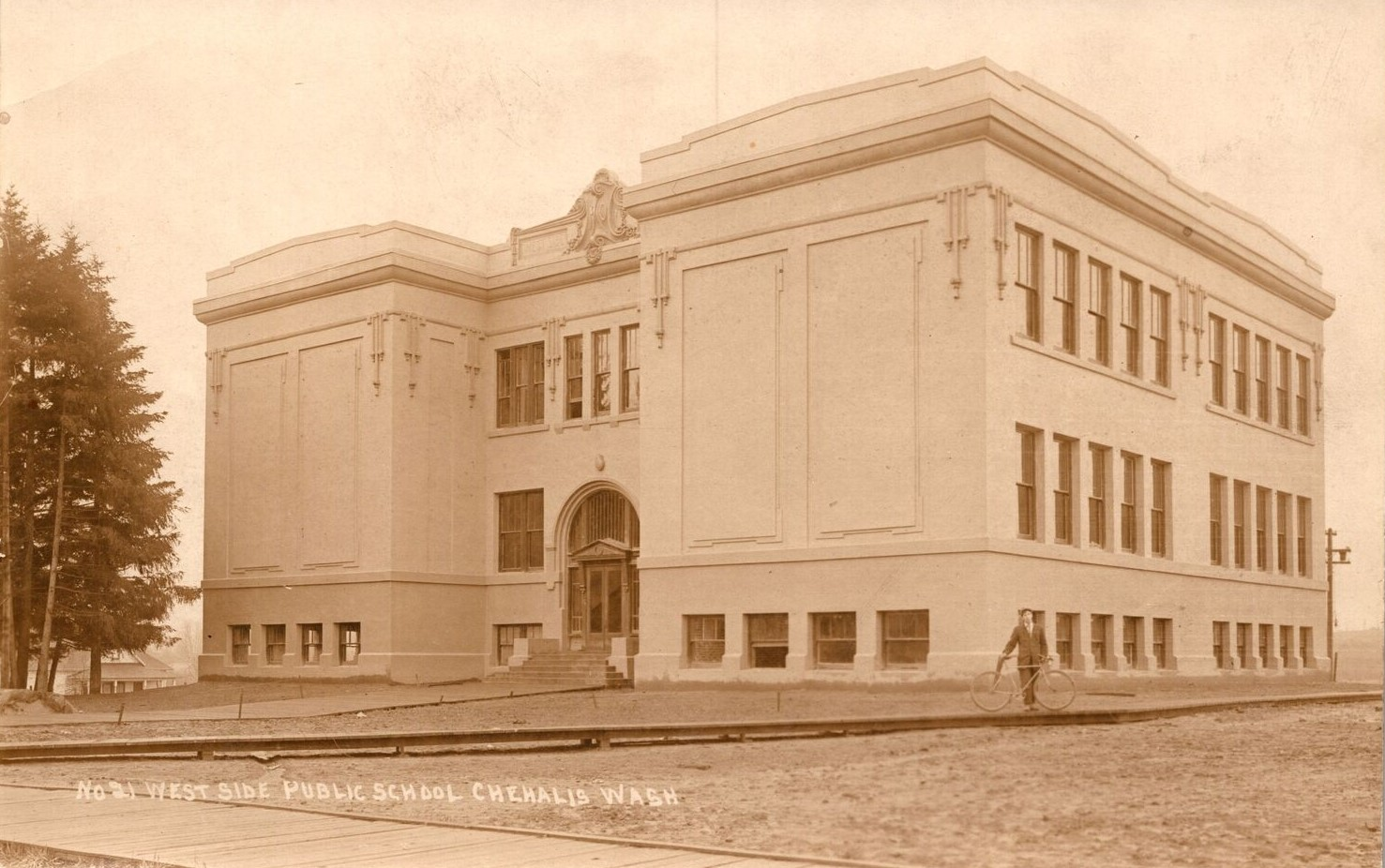
West Side School, post-1910

A fire occurred on February 9, 1910 that decimated the institution; the school collapsed during the blaze and had an estimated loss of $15,000. The fire was due to arson, set by at least six young men from neighboring Centralia. The perpetrators, mostly teenagers, were originally arrested for stealing chickens and further questioning led officials to their involvement of the blaze. The school was rebuilt into a two-story, eight-room building that year, designed by architect C. Louis Wilson, at a cost of over $26,000. The new concrete and brick school, built to face the downtown core, had a larger footprint which required the purchase of a section of the existing Westside Park that bordered the site. With help from the student body, over 200 rose bushes were planted on the grounds in 1917 and the schoolhouse expanded to 12 rooms in 1920.

Enrollment numbers in 1915 recorded that almost half of the 1,000 students in Chehalis attended West Side. By 1921, the number dipped to 397 but a continuing increase in students within the city necessitated several changes to the school in 1922. A play shed was built as the schoolhouse had almost been entirely used for classrooms and a city ordinance was introduced declaring that only students west of the railroad tracks operated by Northern Pacific Railway could attend the West Side School. A larger covered play area, 60 ft × 80 ft (18 m × 24 m) in size, was added to the grounds in 1925. After the build of the Cascade Elementary school in 1922, the student population continued to decrease at West Side and the school no longer offered classes above sixth grade. Despite a city-wide increase in student enrollment in 1930, attendance had fallen to 184 pupils at West Side. During the 1933 school year, budget shortfalls during the Great Depression led to the school to suffer deep cuts to its budget, including a 20% reduction in teacher salaries and the loss of half of the building's heating output. Attendance numbers dropped further, recording 154 students in the 1936 schoolyear. After the schoolhouse in Claquato burned down in January 1937, the Chehalis School District invited Claquato students to attend West Side; the city of Chehalis paid for transportation costs and offered all amenities to the new pupils. Students from the Logan Hill district, east of the rail tracks, began attending West Side in 1940. Notwithstanding the dwindling enrollment numbers, the school was considered overcrowded during its tenure.

In 1932, the first cherry tree was planted on the grounds during a Washington state bicentennial ceremony. The site was overhauled in a 1938 project undertaken by the Works Progress Administration. The play shed was remodeled to include a basketball court and areas for gymnastics. A playground with two ballfields, a tennis court, an outdoor basketball court, and play equipment were completed.

The schoolhouse was severely damaged during the 1949 Olympia earthquake and was demolished. Pupils attended Cascade Elementary or traveled to the Forest district. The remaining burned husk of the schoolhouse was put up for disposal bid in December 1950 after a district vote that chose to sell the building rather than "deed the property to the city for community purposes". The removal was also required that year after West Street was being extended as an overpass over the newly forming interstate. A farmer from Adna submitted the only bid on the schoolhouse and the grounds were planned to be sold later. The site of the West Side School was put up for sale by the school district in 1952, advertised for potential use as lots for homes.
