= Hillside Historic District (Chehalis, Washington) =

NRHP-listed site in Chehalis, Washington

- U.S. National Register of Historic Places
- U.S. Historic district
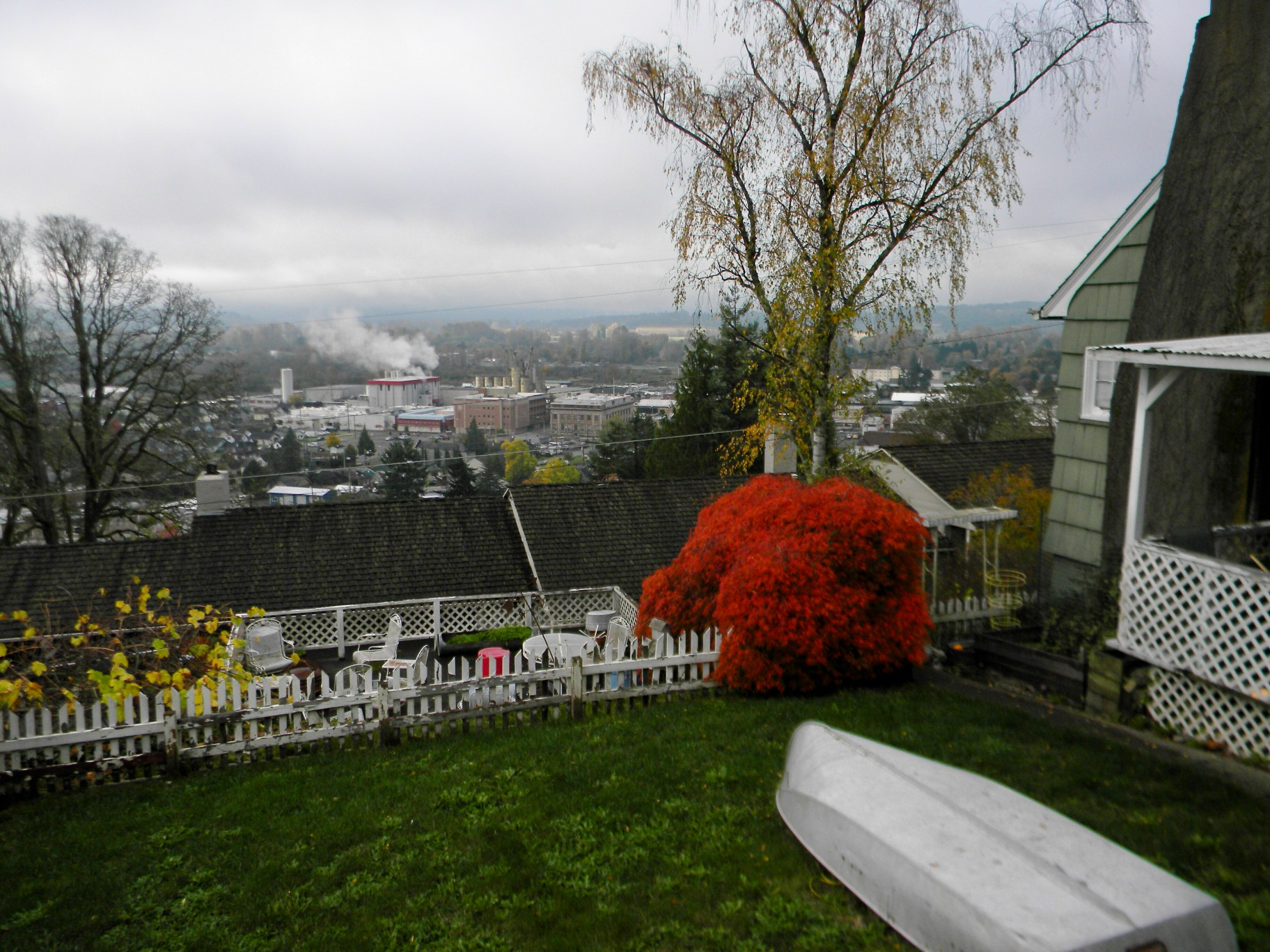
- View from the hillside of the Chehalis government district

- Location within Washington (state)
- Location: Roughly bounded by Jefferson Ave., Hill St., Washington Ave., and 9th St., Chehalis, Washington
- Coordinates: 46°39′49″N 122°57′52″W
- Area: 125 acres (51 ha)
- Built: 1890
- Architectural style: American Craftsman/Bungalow, American Foursquare, Colonial Revival, Queen Anne, Tudor
- MPS: Chehalis MPS
- NRHP reference No.: 96000841
- Added to NRHP: August 1, 1996

The Hillside Historic District is a neighborhood located on Park Hill in Chehalis, Washington and has been listed on the National Register of Historic Places (NRHP) since 1996. It is one of three NRHP neighborhoods in the city, including the Pennsylvania Avenue-West Side Historic District and the Chehalis Downtown Historic District, which borders the Hillside District. Numerous homes have been awarded recognition by the Chehalis Historic Preservation Commission for their architectural and historical importance to the city.

The hillside was originally part of a land claim under the Saunders family, the founders of what would later become the city of Chehalis. The area was used for timber and mining in the community's early days. The build of a residential neighborhood began in 1888 with the first homes erected by 1890. Progress was initially slow with a major expansion of home construction occurring during the mid-to-late 1900s, which also included several infrastructure improvements such as a reservoir and sewer system.

Several pioneer and prominent Chehalis families resided in the Hillside District during the early 20th century, many of which either owned large tracts on the hill or helped to expand the neighborhood further. In the 1920s, another infrastructure and residential expansion progressed and by the 1930s, the district was considered mostly complete. The hillside underwent the addition of modern changes, such as the construction of apartment buildings, in the 1960s and 1970s.

The Hillside District contains a variety of differing residential architectural styles, including American Foursquare and several types of American Craftsman and Craftsman Bungalows. Distinct styles in the neighborhood include Dutch Colonial, French Eclectic, Queen Anne, Tudor Revival, and Victorian. Several homes contain turrets, a rare architectural touch in the city. Most homes, due to the upslope of the hill, have views of Chehalis and the surrounding river valley. The district is home to John Dobson and McFadden Parks and the Troop 373 and 7373 Scout Lodge, an NRHP-listed site.

== History ==
At the beginning of the settlement of Saundersville, eventually to become known as Chehalis, the hillside was part of an original Donation Land Claim belonging to the founding family of Chehalis, the Saunders. Under ownership of Elizabeth "Eliza" Tynan Saunders Barrett after a divorce, Obadiah B. McFadden purchased half the claim when he moved the community. In the city's early history, the hill was used for pasture and orchard farming. A crab apple tree known as the Saunders Tree, originally located on Market and 4th Street, grew from a graft completed in 1870 by an unnamed Native American boy and Joseph Saunders, the youngest Saunders son.

The hill also became of use as a natural resource, including coal mining and timber production. In the early 20th century, the hill was used as a rock quarry during street construction in the city. Most of the timber land was owned by the Chehalis Land & Timber Company (CL&T) beginning in 1888; the company was a crucial part of the early platting of the hillside.

Beginning in 1888, the first streets built on the hillside were Adams, Jefferson, and Washington, named by the CL&T after the first presidents in the United States after the Washington territory was granted statehood. Early residential development began in 1890 but only a few homes, scattered amongst the hillside, had been built in a few years. The southern portion of the hillside was rapidly developed between 1905 and 1910. Initial infrastructure construction to provide a residential area on the hillside included a sewer system in 1906 and there were several road builds and improvements, such as the completion of Cascade Avenue from the main thoroughfare of Market Street to the hillside. A reservoir existed during this time that supplied water to the city, fed by the Newaukum River. A replacement reservoir, constructed out of wood, was built in 1928 to provide water specifically for hillside residents. The holding area was capable of containing 100,000 US gallons (380,000 L; 83,000 imp gal). The hill was a location of a wireless telegraphy station, operational and in use as late as 1909.

Pioneers and founding members of the city owned residences, or plots, on the hillside. The home for the matriarch of Chehalis, Eliza Saunders, was near the intersection of Market and Main Street. Approximately half of the lots on Washington Avenue were owned by William Muir Urquhart, a banker, merchant, and long-serving civil servant in the city. Other prominent homeowners included family members of the Chehalis mint company I.P. Callison's & Sons, the banker N.B. Coffman, the attorney Daniel Millett of Millett Field fame, the coal and timber baron T.C. Rush, the mercantile Saindon brothers, and the Sticklin family noted for their funeral parlor. As the years passed into the Roaring Twenties, other notable persons, such as state senator A.E. Judd, continued the history of distinguished residents to call the hillside home.

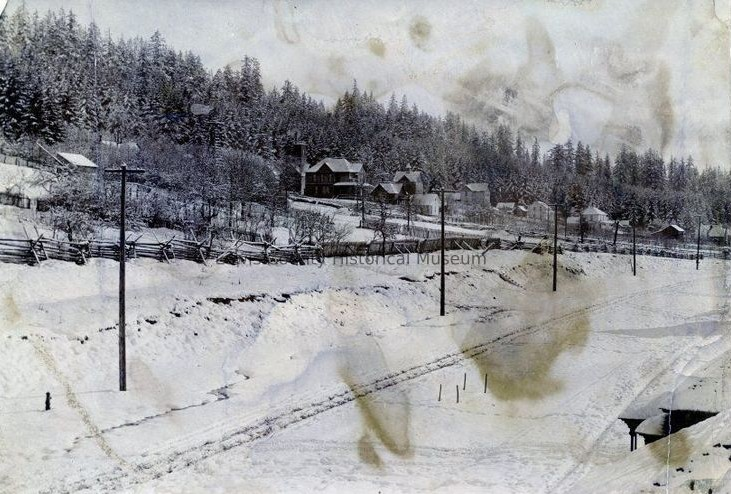
Hillside District, early 1900s

Additional lots began to be partitioned in the late 1900s and 1910s for expansive residential use. By 1910, Coffman surveyed pasture land spanning towards the southern end of the district and platted 50 lots for sale. Sticklin was awarded permission for a tract on Washington Avenue in 1913. In the same year, the Sticklin addition was part of a major access improvement project with the Judd addition, which was near the St. Helens hospital; the efforts included sidewalks and paved roads. In 1921, Judd opened a 10-acre (4.0 ha) parcel around Adams Avenue that he combined via several tract purchases from other preeminent landowners; he also built a home for himself. Judd began the construction of the curved Terrace Road in 1922 and residential development began soon thereafter. The road was paved and completed in 1923, allowing for access into the Sticklin addition, which was completely platted and considered open for residency the same year. The Sticklin tract was renamed as Fair Oaks Park in 1926 and extended from behind city hall on Market Street to the top of Park Hill. The connecting curved roads known as Highland Place and Hillside Drive, which parallels Terrace Road, were constructed and paved in 1927. An improved water line to residents was installed in 1928.

Most of the Hillside District was completed by the 1930s but as the neighborhood aged into the 1960s and 1970s, modern adaptations and changes to the community began to occur. The local power company, Lewis County Public Utility District, started to bury electric power lines for parts of the hillside area in 1969 and the beginning construction of apartment buildings took place in various parts of the historic neighborhood during the early 1970s. Due to a widening project on Market Street, the Saunders Tree was moved in 1968 to Henderson Park where it thrived at first, but the pioneer tree was reported as dead a year or two later. Cuttings were taken and planted at the Chehalis park system's office.

Residents on the Hillside District created a petition in late 2005 against a Les Schwab Tire Center opposing a conditional use permit authorizing the company to store tires in cargo containers on a residential-zoned area on North Street. Negotiations with residents, including additional objection from the Chehalis Historic Preservation Commission, went on long enough that the permit expired in mid-2006; Les Schwab abandoned any further attempt.

=== Accidents and incidents ===
A minor place crash by a commercial pilot known as "Dare Devil" Smith occurred in 1924; other than a broken propeller, no injuries or damages to property were reported. After the Chehalis high school football team in 1926 soundly defeated their Centralia rivals in the annual Thanksgiving Swamp Cup by a score of 61 to 0, townspeople burned a large "C" on the hillside which was reported to be visible from miles around.

== Geography ==
The district is located on the upslope of Park Hill and below the "Top-of-the-Hill" John Dobson and McFadden Parks. The neighborhood borders the Chehalis Downtown Historic District at its most northern reach and stretches south to 11th Street, a block short of Henderson Park. The district encompasses most of Washington, Adams, and Jefferson avenues, including various interconnecting streets. Within the confines of the Hillside Historic District is the Troop 373 and 7373 Scout Lodge, an NRHP-listed site.

== Features ==
Initial dwellings were built in a variety of styles. A majority of homes are of American Craftsman and Craftsman Bungalow styles, with a count of 37 bungalows in the neighborhood. Additional homes feature architectural construction in smaller numbers, including American colonial, American Foursquare, Dutch Colonial, French Eclectic, Queen Anne, Tudor Revival, and Victorian. A rarity in the city as a whole, a few homes in the Hillside District include turrets. Due to the upslope of the terrain, many homes have views of Chehalis, including its downtown historic district, as well as sightlines into the Chehalis Valley and of the Willapa Hills.

== Significance ==
The Hillside Historic District was added to the National Register of Historic Places (NRHP) on August 1, 1996 and the nomination included 141 homes in the district, though 81 additional buildings were excluded either due to alterations or age that did not meet NRHP requirements. The houses selected for inclusion were declared to have "structural honesty and historic integrity" and were noted for a variety of styles, such as American Craftsman, Tudor, and Late-Victorian. In partnership with a consultant and the Washington State Department of Archaeology and Historic Preservation (DAHP), the city's historic preservation commission researched the history of the area. The district during its NRHP nomination process was subsequently nominated for historic status to the Washington State Advisory Council on Historic Preservation.

Although the Hillside District during its early formation was home to the prominent or wealthy of Chehalis, the neighborhood was and is considered a mixed-socioeconomic residential area. Opulent homes, with some on large lots, are interspersed with simpler, working-class homes on smaller plats, an example being houses for millworkers located on Washington Avenue.

== Significant contributing properties ==
Unless otherwise noted, the details provided are based on the 1996 National Register of Historic Places (NRHP) nomination form and may not reflect updates or changes to Hillside Historic District properties in the interim.

=== American Foursquare ===
The Dr. Dow Home was built in the American Foursquare style in approximately 1904 and contains touches of Italianate architecture. Located on Washington Avenue, the house showcases a large porch, various exposed structural details, and a large bay window. A simpler foursquare dwelling is the Schmidt Home, a two-story construction from around 1924 on Hillside Drive. The house lacks dormers or a standard visual break between floors, but contains a Palladian window above the front door.

=== Crafstman and Craftsman bungalow ===
Significant Craftsman-style homes featured in the Hillside District are the Hotchkiss Home, a two-story gablefront house built circa 1912 on Washington Avenue. Known for its large gable, it features a balcony and lead glass windows. Another gable building, the 1 1/2 story Baker House located on Adams Avenue, also contains a porch and lead glass casements, and features several distinctive dormers. Other examples include the 1910 Saunders Home, known for its cross-gable rood and the 1912 Scherer Home, noted for its covered porch and exposed rafters.

Two notable Craftsman Bungalows are the Henriot Home on Terrace, and the Smith Home, on Washington. The Henriot, built around 1923, is noted for its columned porch, gable structure, and exposed structural features. The Smith house is distinguished by a second, off-center gable.

=== Tudor ===
Eleven Tudor-style homes are recorded in the Hillside District. A prominent dwelling of this style is the 2-story Ellington Home on Washington. Constructed with an asymmetrical roofline in approximately 1930, it features terra cotta siding and two connected gables on the front of the home. Another example is the Bishop Home on Terrace, built circa 1928. Recognized for its cross-gable roof and multiple dormers, it's also highlighted by the patterned siding on the second level.

=== Vernacular architecture ===
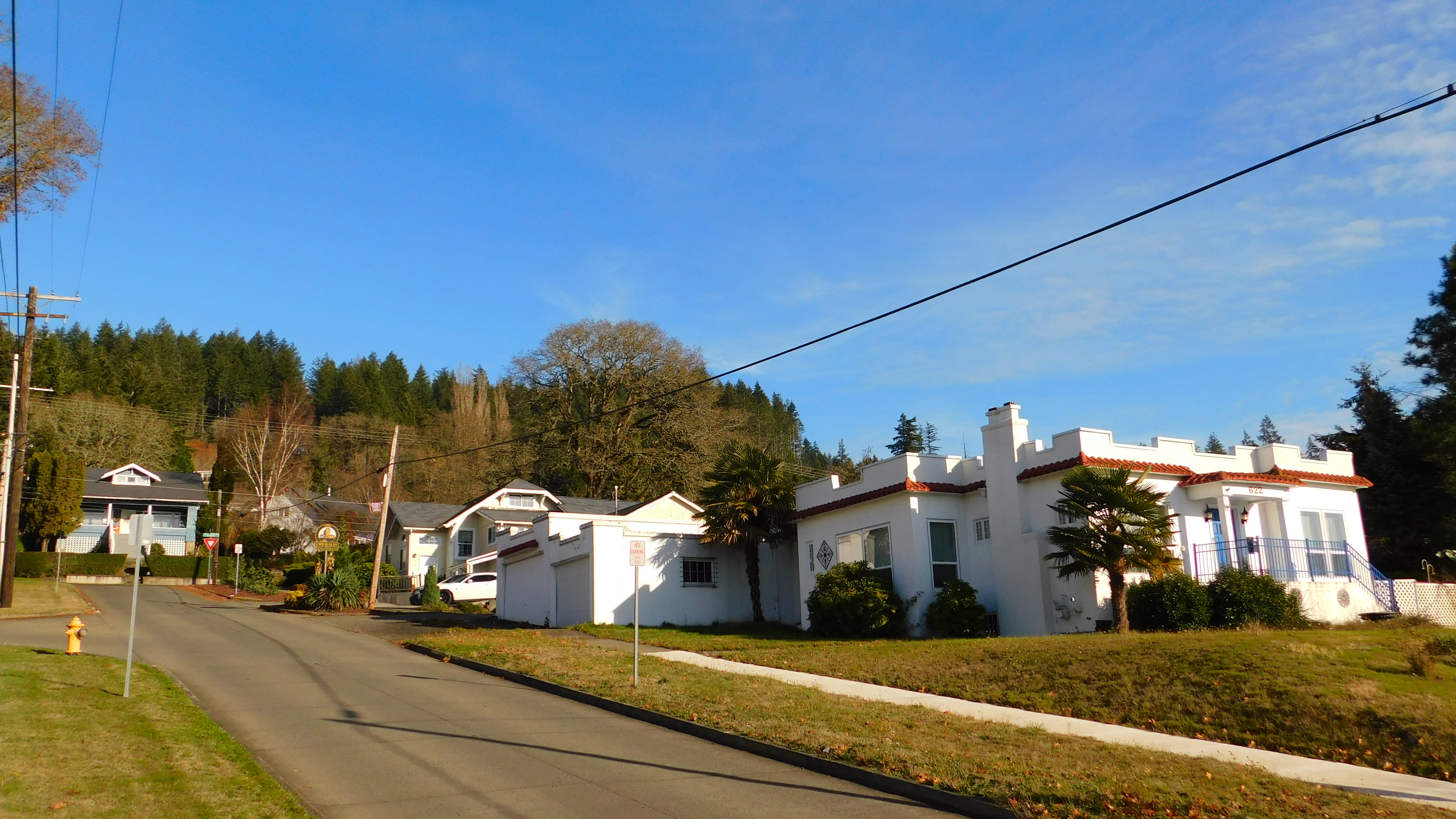
Washington Ave, Hillside District, Boone House, 2024

Several Vernacular architecture buildings, homes constructed based on a broad and mixed scope of architectural and construction styles, are listed with the Hillside District's NRHP designation. Of note is the Cory Home situated on Washington, built for Arthur Cory, a banker and state representative. Constructed in 1925, the two-story structure is known for its original interior details, covered front porch, and windows, one of which includes a pediment. The home was sold to the Lewis County Historical Society and Museum in 1965 for use to house artifacts from the early pioneer days in the region but became of use as a residence years afterwards. A second notable house of this type is the Boone Home, also located on Washington. Constructed around 1925 for a Chehalis mortuary owner, John Boone, the home is the only known dwelling of Mediterranean Revival architecture in the district. Most of the original style has been lost, but the 1 1/2 stucco home features parapets at the flat roofline.

=== Victorian and Queen Anne ===
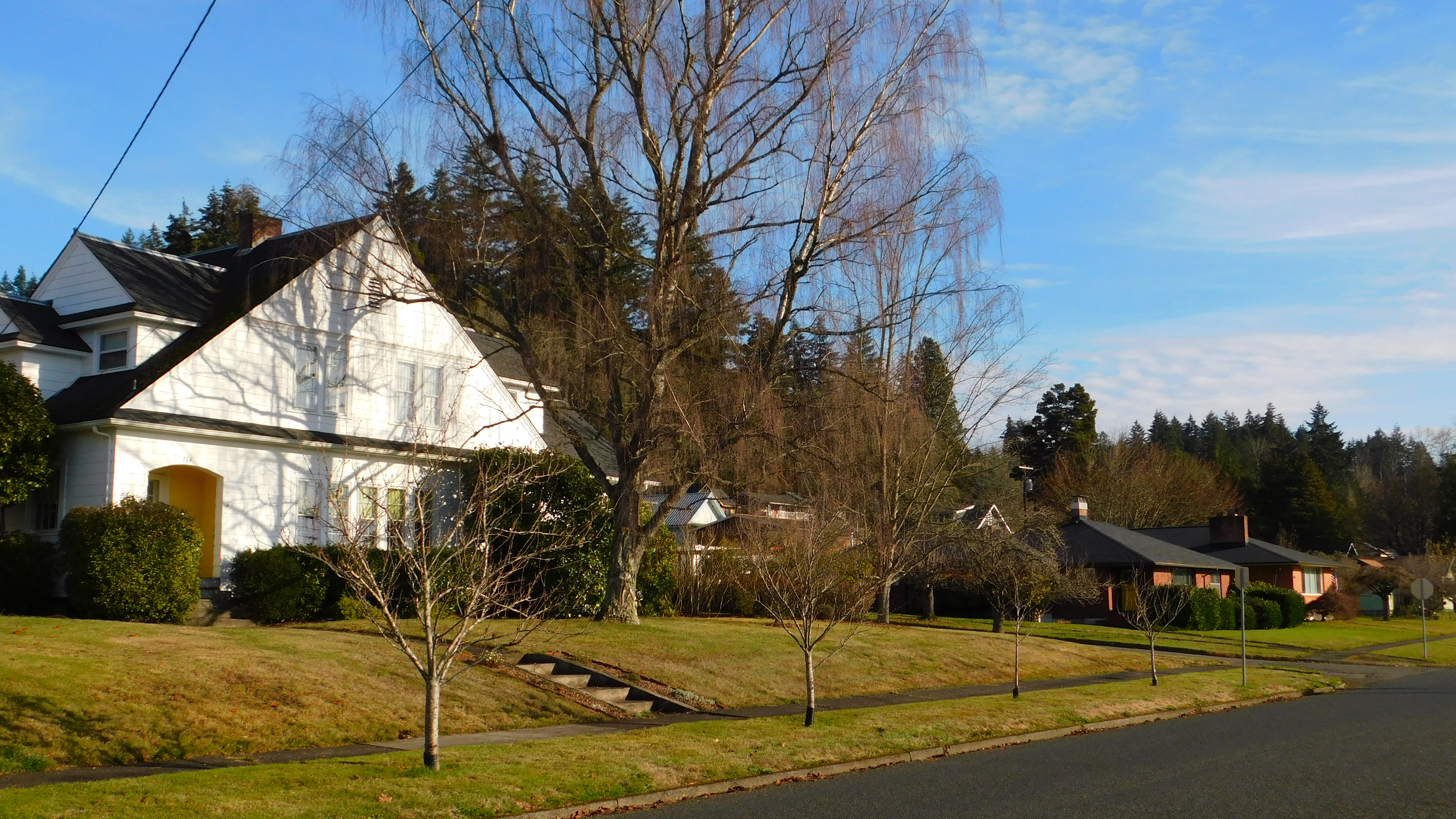
Washington Avenue, Laughlin House, 2024

Various homes that fall under the Queen Anne-Victorian architectural style include one of the oldest homes in the city, the T.C. and Anna Rush house. Built in 1890 on Washington, the Rush family were prominent developers of the early Chehalis Downtown Historic District. The home originally was detailed with gingerbread trim. The Rush house contains a turret and is recognized for its sunburst motif, large gable, and covered porch with turned columns.

The Dieckmann Home was built before 1893 and additions to the dwelling up to 1912 created a Queen Anne-style look. The two-story home was built for gold prospector, Charles Dieckmann. Similar to the Rush Home, the Dieckmann house contains a turret and asymmetrical roof, and is noted for its partial wrap-around front porch

The mansion known as the Burnett House is situated on Northeast Cascade Avenue. Constructed in 1894, it eventually became owned by Morris Burnett, a prominent proprietor of an established jewelry store in the downtown district during the late 19th and early 20th centuries. The home was heavily restored after being purchased by the Barkis family after they moved to Chehalis in the late 1960s. The two-story house has a turret and once contained a second. It also features curved windows and contains a living room that is over 1,000 square feet (93 m^{2}).

A Queen Anne-style home known as the Marietta Manor, is situated on Jefferson Avenue. Known for its columned, warp-around porch and bay windows, the home was built of old growth lumber in 1899.

A Victorian home of note is the Kirk House, which hosted the Nkhoma family of the Church of Central Africa Presbyterian – Nkhoma Synod in 1999.

=== Other styles ===
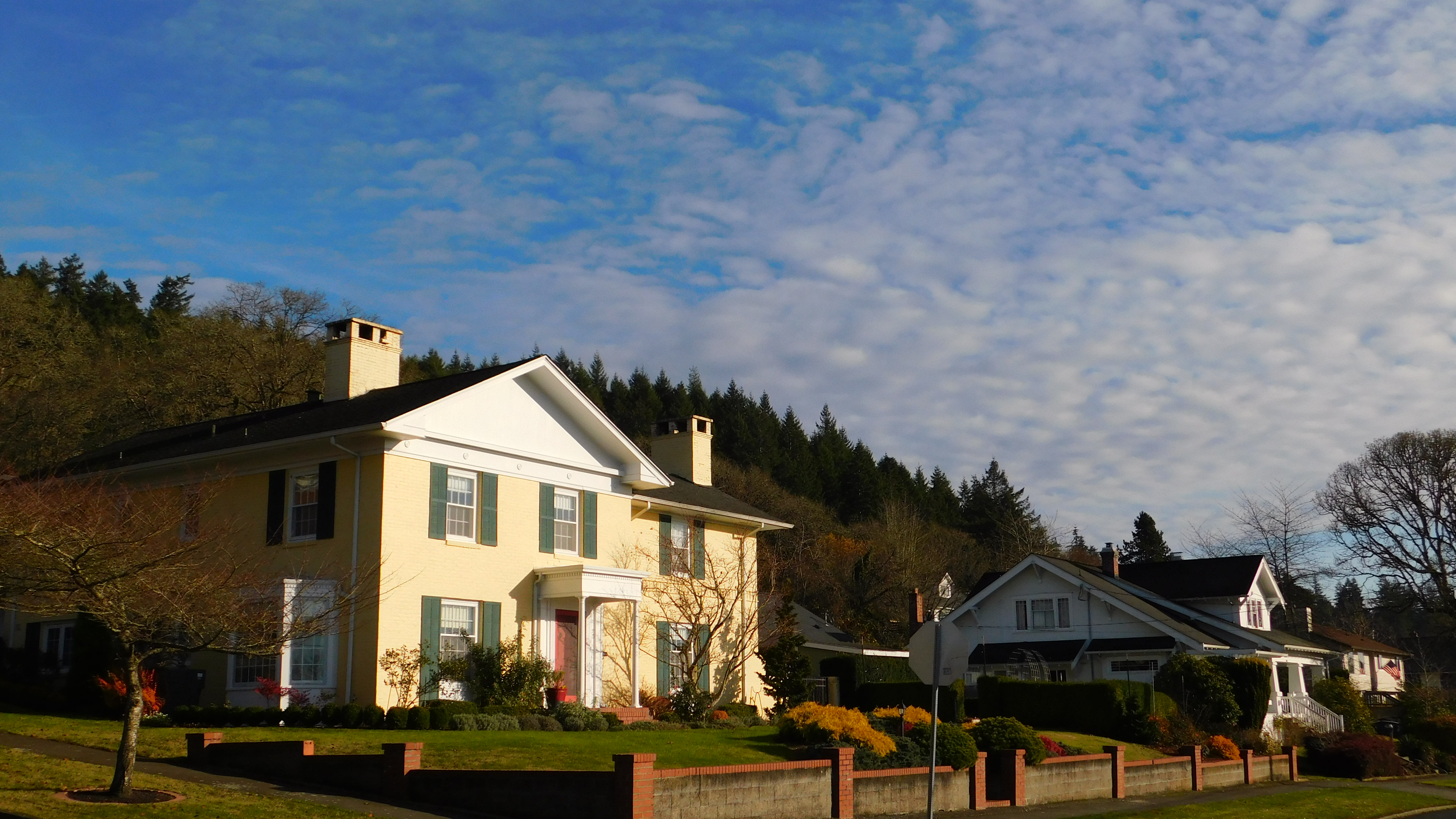
Washington Ave, Hillside District, Turner House, 2024

A rare English cottage-style home in the city is the Ribelin Home on Adams. Designed by architect Jacque “Jack” DeForest Griffin, noted for his work in the Chehalis Downtown District, the home was for A.L. Ribelin, a manager of the city's JCPenney. The two-story stucco dwelling has a simulated thatch roof, various window details included arched casements and stained-glass, and two gables. During the construction, a home to members of the Urquhart family had to be moved across the street to accommodate the new, larger dwelling.

A Colonial-style residence known as the Dr. William Duncan Turner House is located on Washington Avenue, constructed in 1939. The home was designed by Seattle architect George W. Stoddard and may have been the last residence he designed outside of the Seattle metropolitan region. The home was restored beginning in the late-1970s, the exterior brick sandblasted to remove paint.

The dwelling known as the Melin house, built in 1924, was renovated to its original layout.

=== Non-contributing buildings ===
The St. Helens Hospital, with an annex designed by influential Chehalis architect, Jacque “Jack” DeForest Griffin, is located centrally in the district on Washington Avenue and 4th Street but is not included under the NRHP listing.

== Chehalis Historic Preservation Commission ==
The district hosts several homes recognized by the Chehalis Historic Preservation Commission (CHPC). The commission recognizes historical value and the subsequent preservation of homes and buildings in the city. Homes honored with the designation receives a brass plaque that denotes the year of construction and the name of either the architect or original owner of the house.

Homes in the district given recognition from the CHPC in the 1990s include the Boone Home, Burnett Mansion in 1992, Marietta Manor, a Craftsman bungalow and Craftsman cottage on Washington Avenue in 1993, and the Dr. William Duncan Turner Home in 1994. Residences awarded the distinction in the 21st century include the Melin house in 2000 and the Rush Home.

== Parks and recreation ==
At the turn of the 20th century, Chehalis had grown large enough that residents began to require parks for leisure activities. An addition of parks was also to be seen as a symbol for the city's growth and prosperity. Editorials, as early as 1903, listed the hillside as an attractive option for a park. Work on a donated 14-acre (5.7 ha) tract that became Dobson Park began in 1914 and included extensive plans for a road over the hill, the inclusions of a waterfall system to the reservoir, and was to have a tennis court.

Dobson Park became associated with McFadden Park and the pair, situated next to each other, became known as the "Top-of-the-Hill" parks. The 28 acres (11 ha) McFadden Park began in 1912 after land on the hillside was donated to the city in memory of Obadiah McFadden. Mostly unimproved for decades, the grounds were rededicated in 1945 and had been outfitted in the following years with a covered kitchen, picnic areas, and playgrounds. A main road around the rim of the hilltop and a water filtration plant for the city was constructed in the 1960s.

The top-of-the-hill parks are technically considered closed by the city of Chehalis due to maintenance and vandalism difficulties but residents continue to use the parks, especially for hiking.

The parks are joined by a looped trail, the 1.3 miles (2.1 km) Dobson-McFadden Trail. The trailhead is located at the Troop 373 and 7373 Scout Lodge.
