= Joseph P. Manning (Washington politician) =

American politician

- Born: Joseph Philip Manning; October 15, 1827; Montgomery County, Missouri, U.S.
- Died: September 15, 1916 (aged 88); Olympia, Washington, U.S.

Joseph Philip Manning (October 15, 1827 – September 15, 1916) was a pioneer who crossed the Oregon Trail in 1848. He homesteaded north of the Columbia River where he served as a member of the Washington Territory legislature, Lewis County sheriff and assessor, and postmaster of the town of Winlock.

== Pioneer ==
As a young man—barely twenty years of age—he crossed to the Oregon Territory driving a team of oxen. He met Caroline Aubert and her sister who were traveling in the same wagon train. The Aubert family had come to Illinois from Switzerland. Their father had gone west and joined his countryman, John Sutter, in California prior to the discovery of gold. The teenage sisters had been orphaned and had joined the wagon train in the employ of a sympathetic family. Several years after arriving in Oregon, the two were married and moved to the thinly-populated Washington Territory north of the Columbia River.

== Public servant ==
The young couple settled near the Jackson Prairie Courthouse on the Cowlitz River and began a frontier life that not only included clearing and planting fields and raising stock, but participating the public life of the Territory. Joseph served in the Washington Territorial legislature. He was elected both sheriff and assessor of Lewis County.He was appointed and served for many years as postmaster for the town of Winlock.

== Family ==
Most of the seven Manning children married offspring of other early pioneer families and continued living in the area between the Columbia and the Puget Sound. Their daughter Anna married William Muir Urquhart, son of James Urquhart whose post office in Napavine was the mail distribution point for the other post offices in the area. When Washington became a state in 1889 and Olympia became the state capital, the Mannings moved north and lived the rest of their lives in the new capital city.
