= Scout Lodge (Chehalis, Washington) =

NRHP-listed site in Chehalis, Washington

- Troop 373 and 7373 Scout Lodge
- U.S. National Register of Historic Places
- Washington State Heritage Register
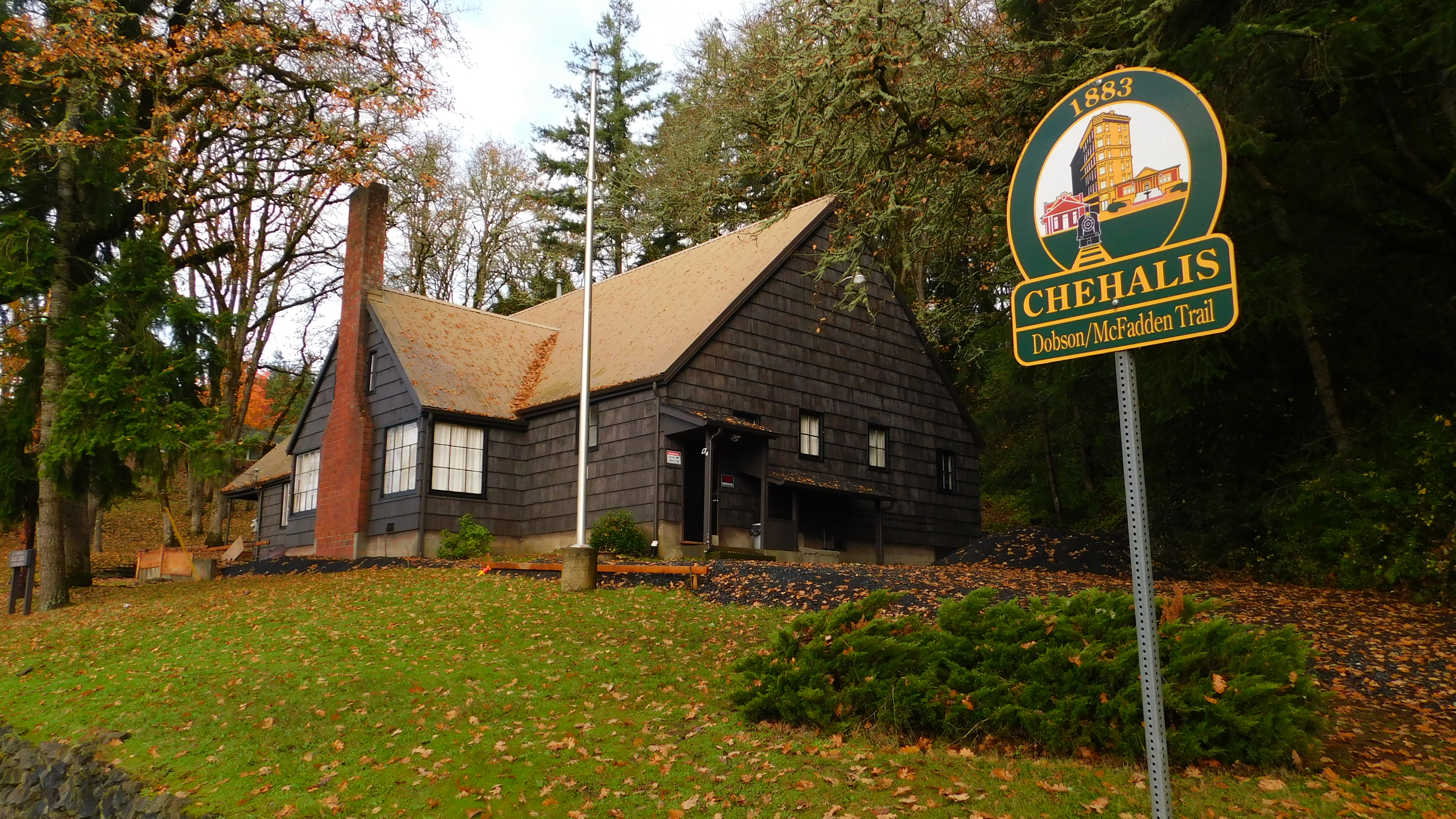
- Troop 373 and 7373 Scout Lodge in Chehalis, Washington

- Location within Washington (state)
- Location: 278 SE Adams Ave., Chehalis, Washington
- Coordinates: 46°39′47″N 122°57′34″W
- Area: less than one acre
- Built: 1938
- Built by: Works Progress Administration
- Architectural style: Rustic/National Park
- Website: City of Chehalis - Scout Lodge
- MPS: Chehalis MPS
- NRHP reference No.: 04001007

Significant dates
- Added to NRHP: September 15, 2004
- Designated WSHR: June 24, 2004

The Scout Lodge, also known as the Troop 373 and 7373 Scout Lodge, is located in Chehalis, Washington in the Hillside Historic District. Constructed by the Works Progress Administration (WPA) beginning in 1937, the lodge was added to the National Register of Historic Places (NRHP) in 2004.

The lodge was opened and dedicated in 1938 and became of use for both boys and girl scout groups in the city. The building was temporarily used for several other purposes during the 20th century. Chehalis High School students used the lodge after the schoolhouse was damaged during the 1949 Olympia earthquake. A local church utilized the building during the 1940s into the early 1950s. Owned by the city, the lodge fell into disrepair by the 1970s, continuing in such a state into the 1990s. A focus on restoring the structure and grounds began in 2000 and various upgrades and maintenance projects in the interim have maintained the lodge in working order during the 21st century.

The Scout Lodge is considered rustic, with a mix of brick and cedar shingles on its exterior. It is most noted for a large, centralized red-brick chimney. The interior contains a basement and a main floor meeting hall with a stage. The forest-setting grounds contain a granite-rubble retaining wall. The Scout Lodge, which borders John Dobson Park, is sometimes considered part of the park. The Dobson-McFadden trailhead is located next to the site.

== History ==
The Scout Lodge was built by the Works Progress Administration (WPA) beginning in 1937 and was open for use in April 1938. One of the first events was an awards program for Girl Scout troops in Chehalis. An official dedication was held on October 4, 1938 and the keynote speaker was George B. Simpson, a Washington state supreme court judge.

Before the lodge was constructed, Chehalis scout troops often met at various other locales, including the Centralia High School, the Chehalis city hall, and the NRHP-listed St. Helens Hotel. During World War II, a caretaker family lived in the upstairs portion of the cabin. After the 1949 Olympia earthquake, students from the city's Chehalis High School finished the 1950 school year by attending classes at the lodge. Beginning in 1942-1943 and lasting until 1953, the Apostolic Faith Church of Chehalis used the Scout Lodge for services while the congregation built a new church.

In 1960, the local scout troops were accused of misusing the lodge. An investigation found that an outside troop had used the hall for purposes other than scouting; the city ordered only scouting events could be held at the lodge in 1961. The city, which owned the cabin, proposed placing oversight of the Scout Lodge under the Chehalis parks department in 1964.

A campfire spread to burn 2 acres (0.81 ha) behind the lodge in 1974. The Scout Lodge was reported as "little-used" by 1975 and was considered for use as an instruction center for folk art and music. The plans did not materialize as local residents in the Hillside District voiced concerns over a lack of parking space. By the mid-1990s, the lodge was described as "run-down" with severe damages to the walls in the building. During a flood that began in late 1996, the Scout Lodge was used as a temporary Red Cross shelter, protecting almost 40 people.

=== Renovations and repairs ===
The lodge underwent various renovations or repairs repeatedly over the course of its existence, beginning in 1952 with the replacement of a plank sidewalk. In coordination, a retaining wall was built to hold back a long-standing issue of a dirt embankment behind the cabin which had begun reach the building. Floors were replaced and other repairs undertaken in 1958, exceeding the budgeted funds. Due to concerns of falling trees, the forested area behind the cabin in Dobson Park was thinned and parts replanted with flowering species. A gas line was installed in 1972.

As part of earning the rank of Eagle Scout, two members of the Chehalis troop recognized the dilapidated state of the cabin and painted the building in 2000. Along with several volunteers, the 264-hours combined project also included the painting of the lodge sign. Multiple repairs and upgrades to the Scout Lodge occurred in 2020 that included a new flag pole and water intrusion prevention into the building.

=== Chehalis scout troop history ===
Earlier existing Girl Scout troops and Brownies in the city and county held day camps at the Scout Lodge during the mid-20th century. A Brownie award event at the cabin in 1956 featured a blackface performance by the young girls.

The Troop 373 boy scout group was officially formed in 1968 after a charter backed by a local Rotary club. The group held a 50-year anniversary at the lodge in 2018, noting that 125 members of the troop had achieved the rank of Eagle Scout since the charter began.

In September 1982, a group of Chehalis scouts found a Soviet Union spy buoy while hiking near La Push, Washington. On December 24, 1987, during a visit to Australia to participate in the World Scout Jamboree, a group of Chehalis Troop 321 scouts and leaders were involved in a head-on collision while traveling in the Snowy Mountains north of Canberra. Nine scouts were injured and one of the members died, 17-year old Jeffrey Carrington. His father, an Assistant Scoutmaster, was also injured in the accident.

The Troop 7373 girl scout group, one of the first all-female troops formed in Lewis County, began in 2019 after the Boy Scouts of America (Scouts BSA), began to accept girl troops into its ranks. Two Chehalis girls achieved the first Eagle Scout rank by a girl troop member in 2020. Part of an overall inaugural class for girl scouts under the Scouts BSA, the level of Eagle Scout usually takes several years to earn.

== Architecture and features ==
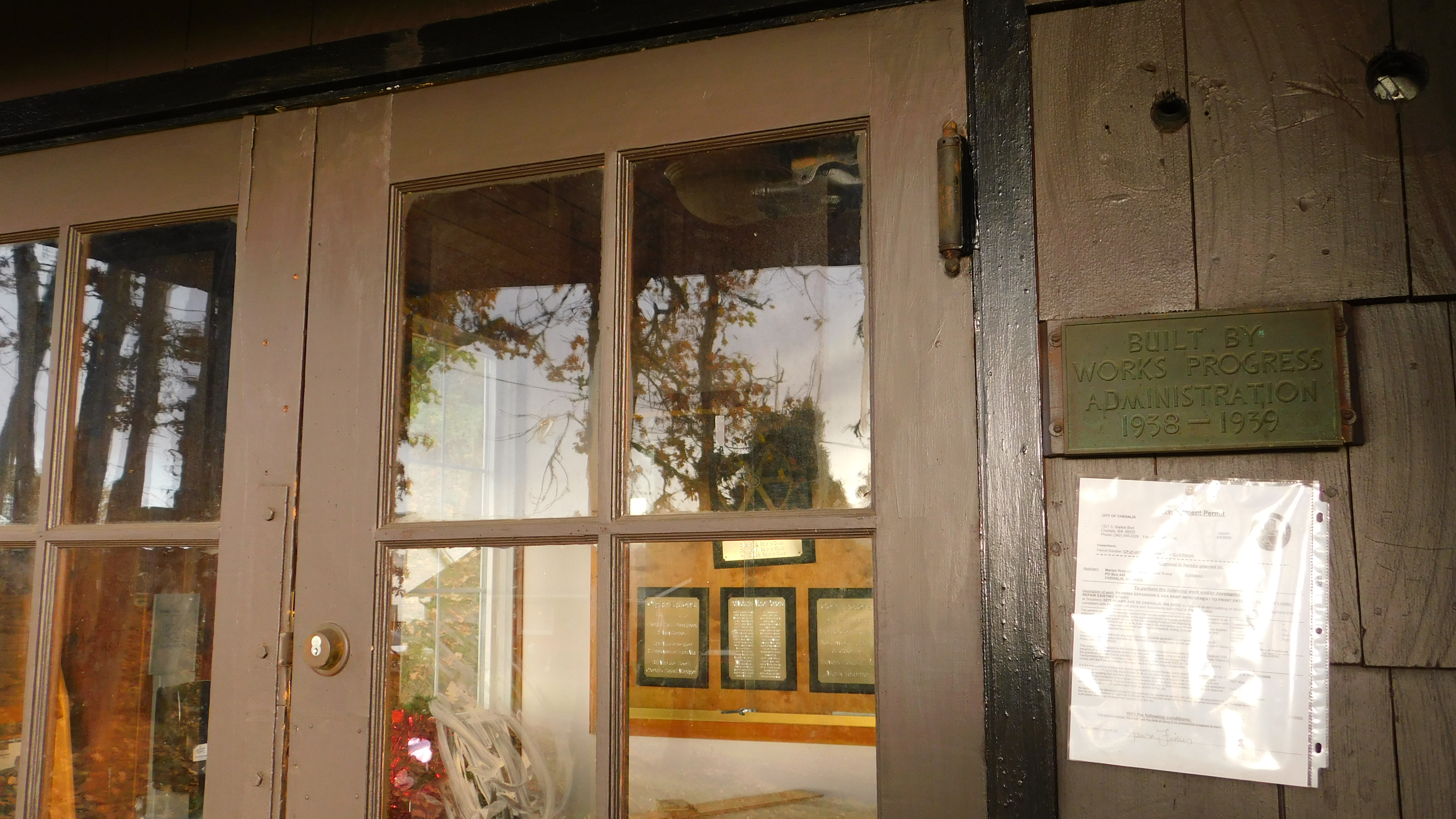
Main entrance to the Scout Lodge

The Rustic architecture-style 1 1/2 story lodge is 58 ft × 82 ft (18 m × 25 m) in size and is built on a concrete foundation. The exterior walls contain a mix of cedar shingle and brick. The most striking feature of the lodge is a red brick chimney situated in the middle of the front gable. The cabin contains several multiple-light casement windows. The roof was originally cedar shake but converted to a metal roof around 1983. The double-door entrance is under a covered porch and a second entrance is situated on the opposite end of the building. The interior contains a basement converted into a meeting space and the main meeting hall, covered in pine paneling and hosting a stage, is situated on the ground floor.

The land is sloped and the site contains a granite-rubble retaining wall. The building is situated on slightly landscaped grounds surrounded by a forest and park setting featuring Douglas fir and oak trees.

== Significance ==
Owned by the city of Chehalis, the building is communally used by both the Chehalis boy's and girl's scout troops. The historic site has hosted functions for the city and the local Civil Air Patrol. On September 15, 2004, the Scout Lodge was added to the National Register of Historic Places. The lodge was noted for its rustic style often used by the WPA during the Great Depression and its association with similar styles long used in federal park and recreation buildings.

Prior to the national designation, the Scout Lodge was listed with the Washington State Heritage Register on June 24, 2004.

== John Dobson Park ==
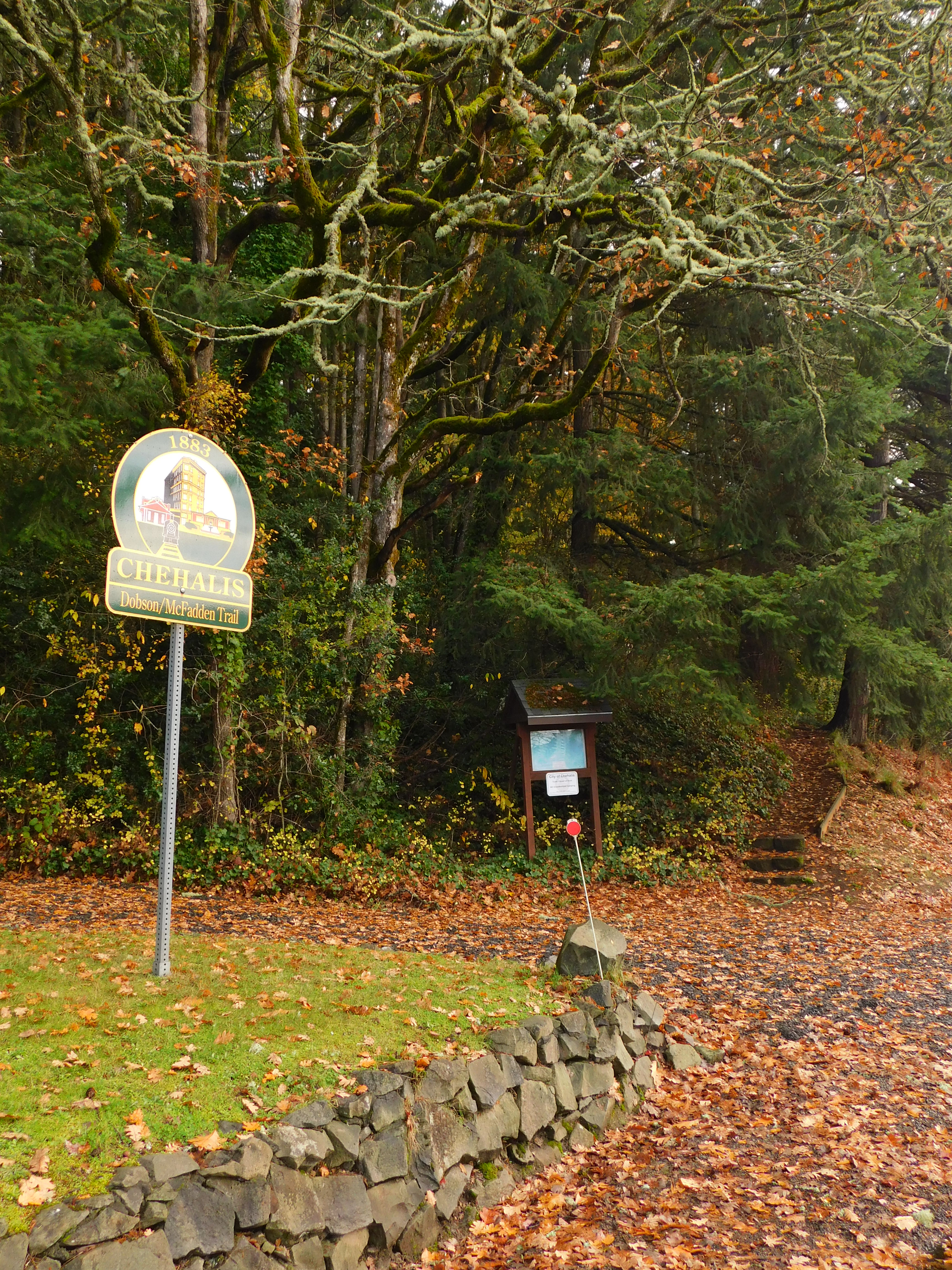
Trailhead for the Dobson-McFadden Trail

John Dobson Park is located on Park Hill directly above and behind the Scout Lodge. The lodge is sometimes reported or considered to be a part of the park. Named after a local farmer who became a prominent Chehalis banker, the park grounds were donated in 1908 after his death the prior year. The park was initially 15.5 acres (6.3 ha) and had been expanded in the following decades to be listed as much as 26 acres (11 ha) in size.

The park would be consistently listed for years as undeveloped. John Dobson Park was formally dedicated in July 1933 and a community recreational building with playgrounds were constructed at the park during the WPA build of the lodge.

A steep 1.3 miles (2.1 km) long trail, the Dobson-McFadden, is accessible at the Scout Lodge.

== See also ==
- Scouting in Washington (state)
