= Westside Park (Chehalis, Washington) =

Park in Chehalis, Washington

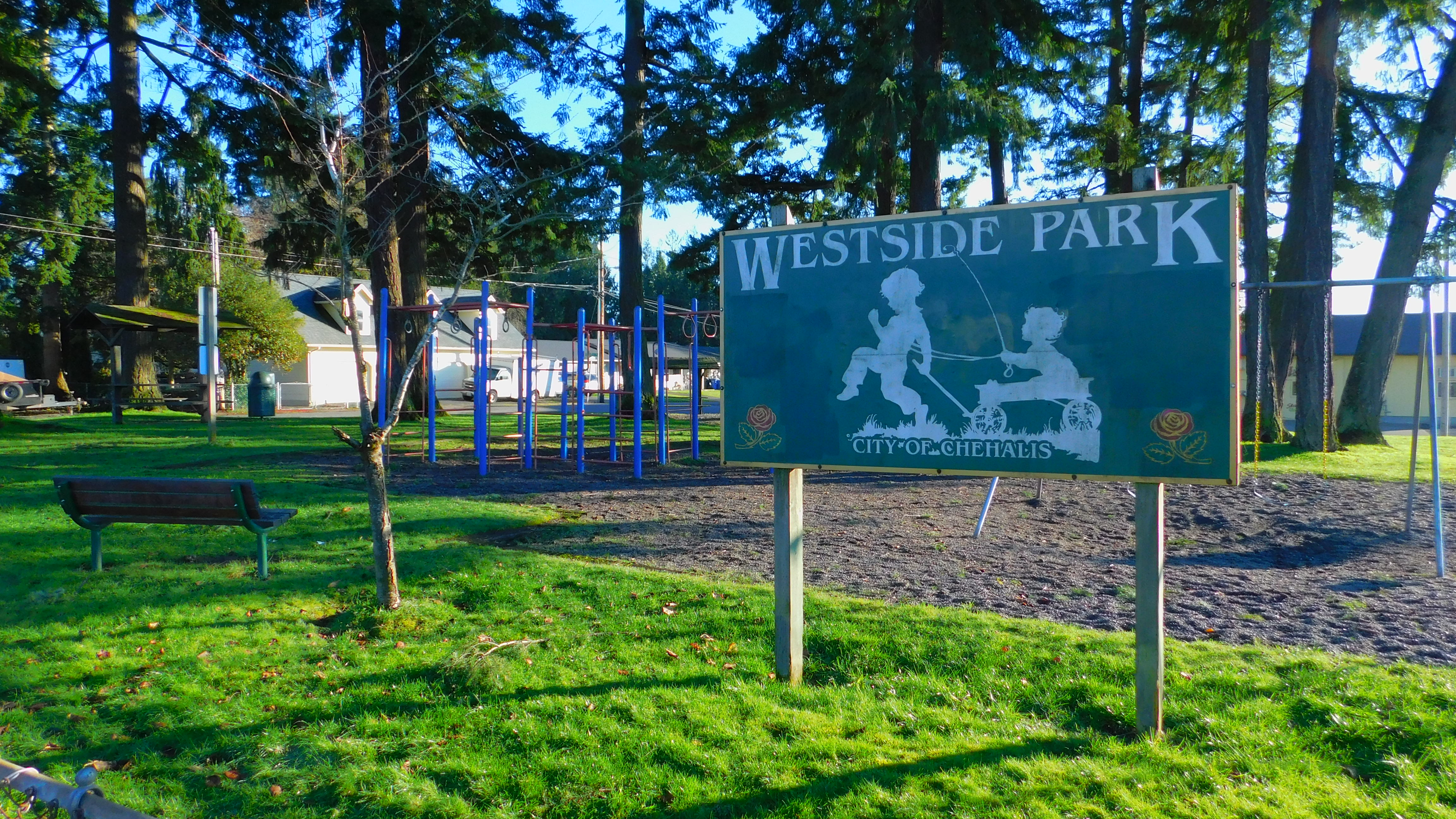
- Westside Park, Chehalis, Washington, 2022

- Location within Washington (state)
- Type: Playground, picnic area
- Coordinates: 46°39′59″N 122°58′42″W
- Area: 1 acre (0.40 ha)
- Established: approx. 1949
- Status: Open
- Terrain: Flat
- Plants: Cherry trees
- Parking: Street
- Facilities: None

Westside Park is located in Chehalis, Washington in the city's Pennsylvania Avenue-West Side Historic District which was catalogued on the National Register of Historic Places (NRHP) in 1991.

The 1-acre (0.40 ha) park contains basketball courts, a playground, and picnic areas. It is known locally for its blossoming cherry trees, first planted in 1932, and towering conifers.

== History ==
The park began in 1894 (Note: Early reporting in the area spells the name of the school as West Side, and mentions the year of construction as 1907.) and the area became a playground and recreation area for the West Side School. An initial motion to beautify the park and keep the area kept as a playground for the school were begun in 1905, and upgrades were begun in 1906; preparations to regrade the grounds took place in 1908. Due to extensive damages to the school during the 1949 Olympia earthquake, the building was razed and the park became public.

A memorial bench in the park was dedicated in 2007 to Gavin Crandell, a sixteen year-old who died the prior year after being struck by a train at a crossing 0.5 miles (0.80 km) away. Westside Park was a popular gathering spot for the teenager.

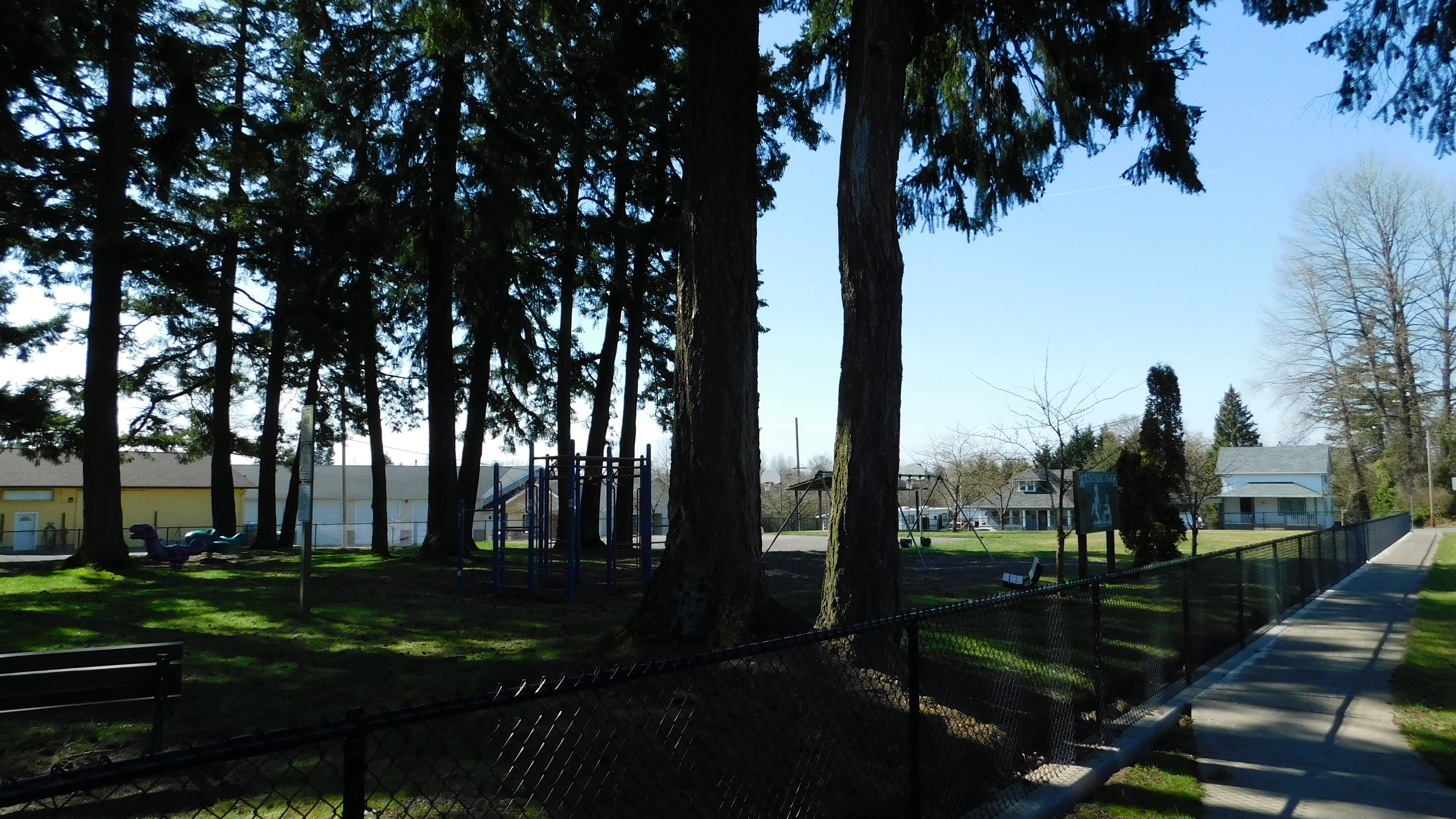
Westside Park, 2023

In 2021, a volunteer neighborhood group, the Friends of Westside Park, organized as a non-profit 501(c)(3) and began to oversee improvements to the park. That same year, the group, in collaboration with the Chehalis Foundation, were able to receive a $20,000 earmark for the park from the Chehalis City Council as a beginning funding effort for future renovations. An additional $95,000 in capital was added in 2023. Considered the first of potentially three phases of renovations, the $115,000 total funding is to aid in the purchase of new playground equipment, the construction of a perimeter fence, and to upgrade the sidewalks and parking areas to be in compliance with the Americans with Disabilities Act (ADA).

The welcome sign to the neighborhood, located in a traffic calming roundabout directly east of the park at the intersection of West and Pennsylvania, was destroyed in a hit-and-run incident in December 2023.

Westside Park is unable to qualify for listing with the National Register of Historic Places (NRHP) due to a loss of records during a 1910 fire at the defunct West Side School.

== See also ==
- Parks and Recreation in Chehalis, Washington
