= O. K. Palmer House =

NRHP-listed site in Chehalis, Washington

- O.K. Palmer House
- U.S. National Register of Historic Places
- Washington State Heritage Register
- Chehalis Historic Preservation Commission
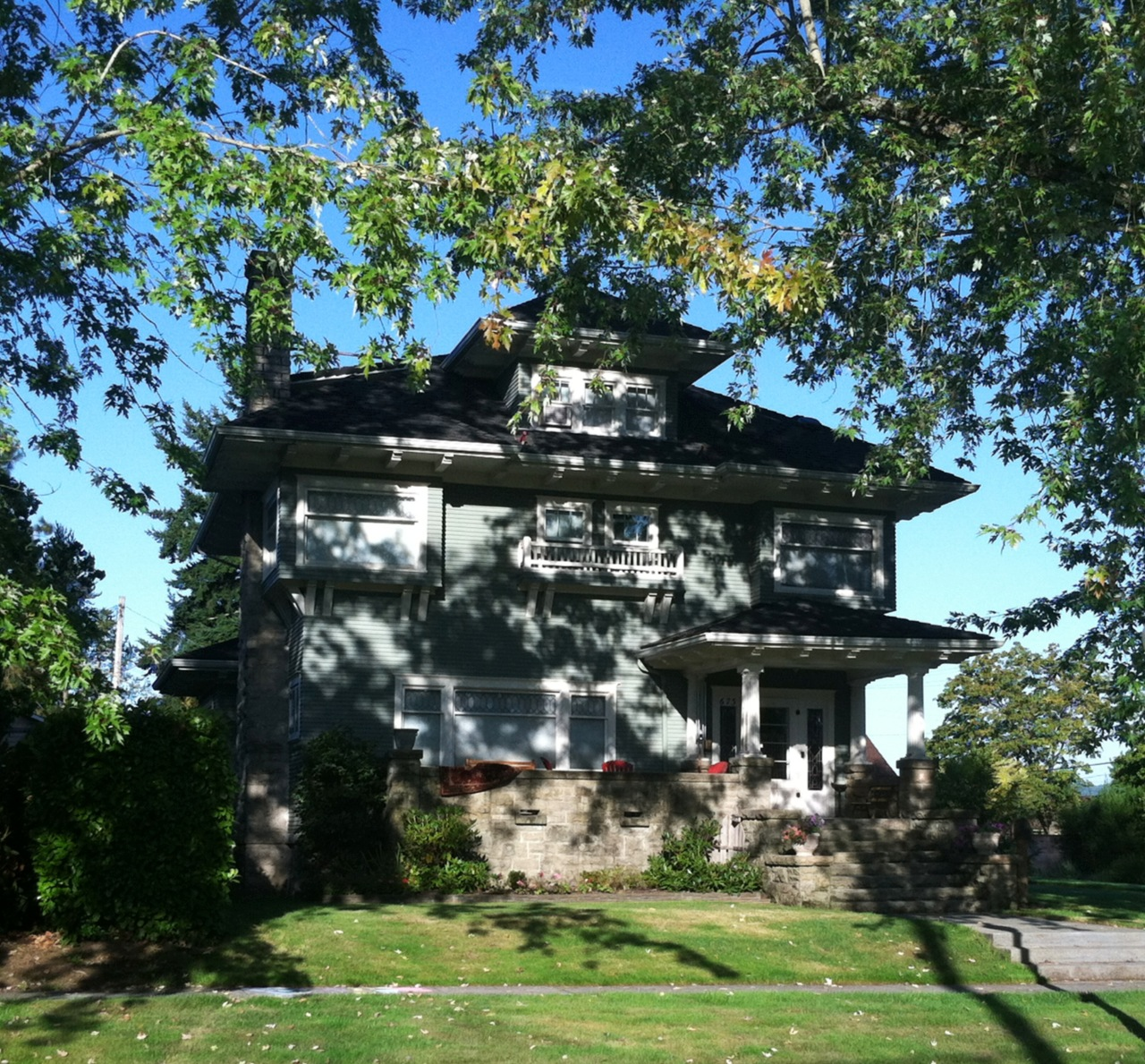
- O.K. Palmer House

- Location within Washington (state)
- Location: 673 N.W. Pennsylvania, Chehalis, Washington
- Coordinates: 46°40′03″N 122°58′31″W
- Area: less than one acre
- Built: 1910
- Architectural style: American Foursquare
- MPS: Chehalis MPS
- NRHP reference No.: 86001067

Significant dates
- Added to NRHP: May 15, 1986
- Designated WSHR: May 15, 1986
- Designated CHPC: 2006

The O. K. Palmer House is the historic home of Osmer K. Palmer and is located in Chehalis, Washington. The building was listed on the National Register of Historic Places (NRHP) in 1986 and is situated in the city's NRHP-listed Pennsylvania Avenue-West Side Historic District.

The Palmer family purchased the property in 1908. The site contained a previously built home which was replaced when the O. K. Palmer House was constructed between 1910 and 1911. Palmer purchased an adjacent lot in 1920, expanding the parcel, then traded the home for another in the historic district in 1924. Osmer Palmer was the founder of the city's Palmer Lumber and Manufacturing Company and became a noted businessman and community leader in Chehalis.

The American Foursquare home is recognized for its numerous exterior features, such as the roofline and dormers. In 2006, the house was awarded for its historical and architectural value to the city by the Chehalis Historic Preservation Commission.

== History ==
Osmer K. Palmer and his wife purchased the property, which had an existing home, in 1908 from Mr. and Mrs. Jacob Miller. Palmer rebuilt the historic home beginning in 1910 and was near completion by the end of 1911. The construction costs were recorded as $6,000. The Palmers expanded the lot after purchasing an adjoining parcel at the Pennsylvania-Folsom intersection in 1920. Four years later in 1924, Palmer traded the entire parcel and home to T.J. Long, for the Long's house further down Pennsylvania Avenue.

The house won a $5 third-place prize in the 1927 Chehalis Better Home Premises contest. A renovation, done by homeowners at the time, was completed in 1999.

=== Osmer K. Palmer ===
Osmer Palmer was born in Indiana in 1872. He arrived in Chehalis in 1906 from Tennessee, after laboring in a wagon manufacturing division of the Studebaker Corporation in Memphis. He founded the Palmer Lumber and Manufacturing Company in Chehalis in 1908 which became a catalogue-based, pre-built home business when Palmer expanded the company in 1919. The lumber company factory burned down in 1911 but Palmer had it rebuilt the following year, enlarging the footprint in 1925.

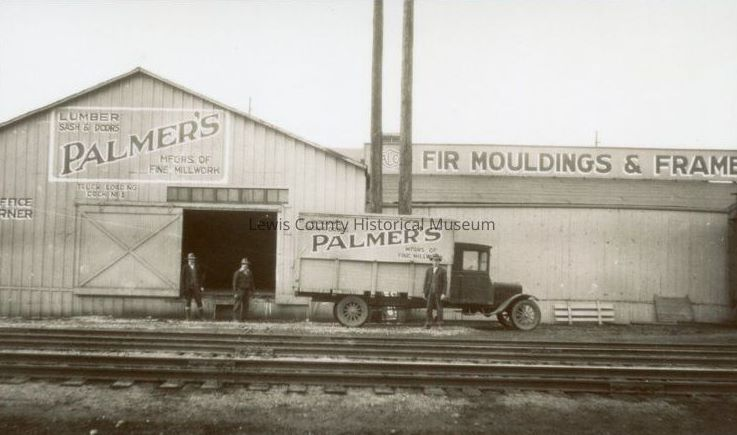
Palmer Lumber Company, ca. 1920

The company produced a variety of materials used in home construction, including columns, doors, gutters, and windows, expanding into finished lumber and millwork. The Palmer Lumber Company was considered the leading manufacturer of millwork in Chehalis by the 1930s. During Palmer's oversight, his lumber company worked in partnership with Gordon-Van Tine Company and produced millwork products for the Montgomery Ward catalog. As of 2023, the company remains in existence.

Palmer served as a school board director for the Chehalis School District, and during the Great War, was chairman of the Chehalis Council of Defense. He retired and sold the Palmer Lumber Company in 1943; the sale was thought to be the largest ever on record in Chehalis at the time.

The Palmers had three children. His only son, Leon, died of pneumonia in 1918 while attending an aviation training camp as an enlisted student. Osmer Palmer died in 1952.

== Geography ==
The O.K. Palmer House is located in the Pennsylvania Avenue-West Side Historic District, one of three NRHP districts in the city of Chehalis, Washington. The main entrance of the home faces east.

== Architecture and features ==
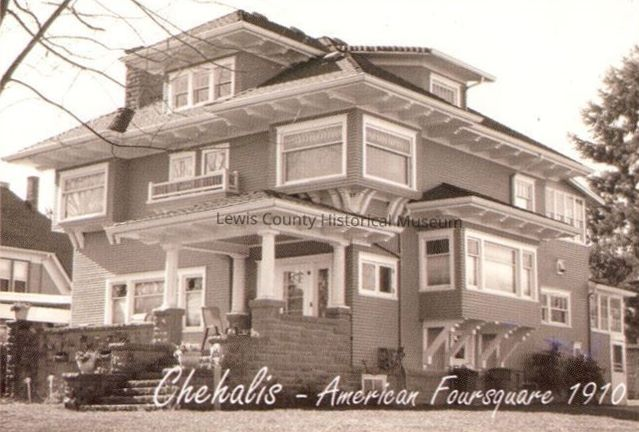
O.K. Palmer House, northeast view

Unless otherwise noted, the details provided are based on the 1986 National Register of Historic Places (NRHP) nomination form and may not reflect updates or changes to the O.K. Palmer House in the interim.

The home is a 2 1/2 story, American Foursquare style residential structure. (Note: The NRHP nomination form also refers to the architectural style as Classic Box.) Following standard Foursquare design, the house rests upon a squared, sandstone foundation and contains a basement. The Palmer House contains a large front porch with several broad pillars. Other features include bay windows, a low-pitched hipped roof and dormers, and distended eaves.

=== Exterior ===
The low-pitch hip roof is supported through numerous block-form modillions and contains a centrally located dormer with a matching roof style. Additional dormers are located on the shed roofs of the north and west sides of the residence. A brick chimney rises above the roof line on the south end.

The façade is covered in narrow, beveled siding with a sandstone wall supporting the porch. The main entrance is located at the northeast corner of the home, protected by a hip roof porch. The architectural element is supported by fluted columns resting on sandstone plinths. The eaves of the front porch mirror that of the main roof of the house.

On the first and second levels, rectangular windows on the north and side sides extend out from the face of the home, supported by brackets and protected by a small hip roof. A balcony with a balustrade railing on the second floor protrudes centrally from the front face of the residence. A second=floor enclosed porch is located at the rear of the home which contains four-over-four sash windows. A rear entrance porch is enclosed.

Most windows of the home are evenly spaced and vary in size but mostly contain a double-sash casement of leaded glass and single-pane. The front entrance contains sidelights with beveled glass. All doors and windows are trimmed in a simple style with some overhead crown molding.

=== Interior ===
Sandstone fireplaces are located in the main living room and in the basement. Beamed ceilings dominate the first floor entrance hall, as well as in the dining and living rooms. The main level features dovetailed mahogany and oak flooring and original components such as wainscotting and built-in cabinets that contain lead glass panels.

The second floor, host to four bedrooms, is accessed by a straight-reversed stairwell.

=== Garage ===
The garage, also on a rectangular footprint, mirrors the exterior appearance of the residence, with horizontal siding and a hip roof with dormers. A large sliding garage door dominates the east face of the structure. The outbuilding, part of the NRHP listing, is located immediately to the northwest of the Palmer home.

== Significance ==
The house was officially accepted to the National Register of Historic Places, and the Washington State Heritage Register, on May 15, 1986. As of 2023, the Palmer House was one of eleven NRHP sites in the city of Chehalis.

The residence was considered for its significance to Palmer, whose industrious nature and businesses were connected to the early 20th century economic formation of the city of Chehalis. The architectural style was recognized for its connection to the era and as a similar footprint to Palmer's "ready-cut" homes manufactured at his fabrication company. The exterior of the residence was noted in the NRHP form to be in a near unaltered state; the interior was considered nearly untouched as well. Due to the untouched nature of the structure along with the home's notable features, the O.K. Palmer House was declared by the National Register of Historic Places to be "among the best examples of the style in the area".

The O.K. Palmer House was awarded recognition as a historic, renovated home by the city of Chehalis via its Chehalis Historic Preservation Commission. The accolade, given in 2006, lists the home as a crucial part of the history of the city and a plaque, denoting the original build and important restoration dates, is displayed on the house.

== See also ==
- O. B. McFadden House
