= O. B. McFadden House =

NRHP-listed site in Chehalis, Washington

- U.S. National Register of Historic Places
- Washington State Heritage Register
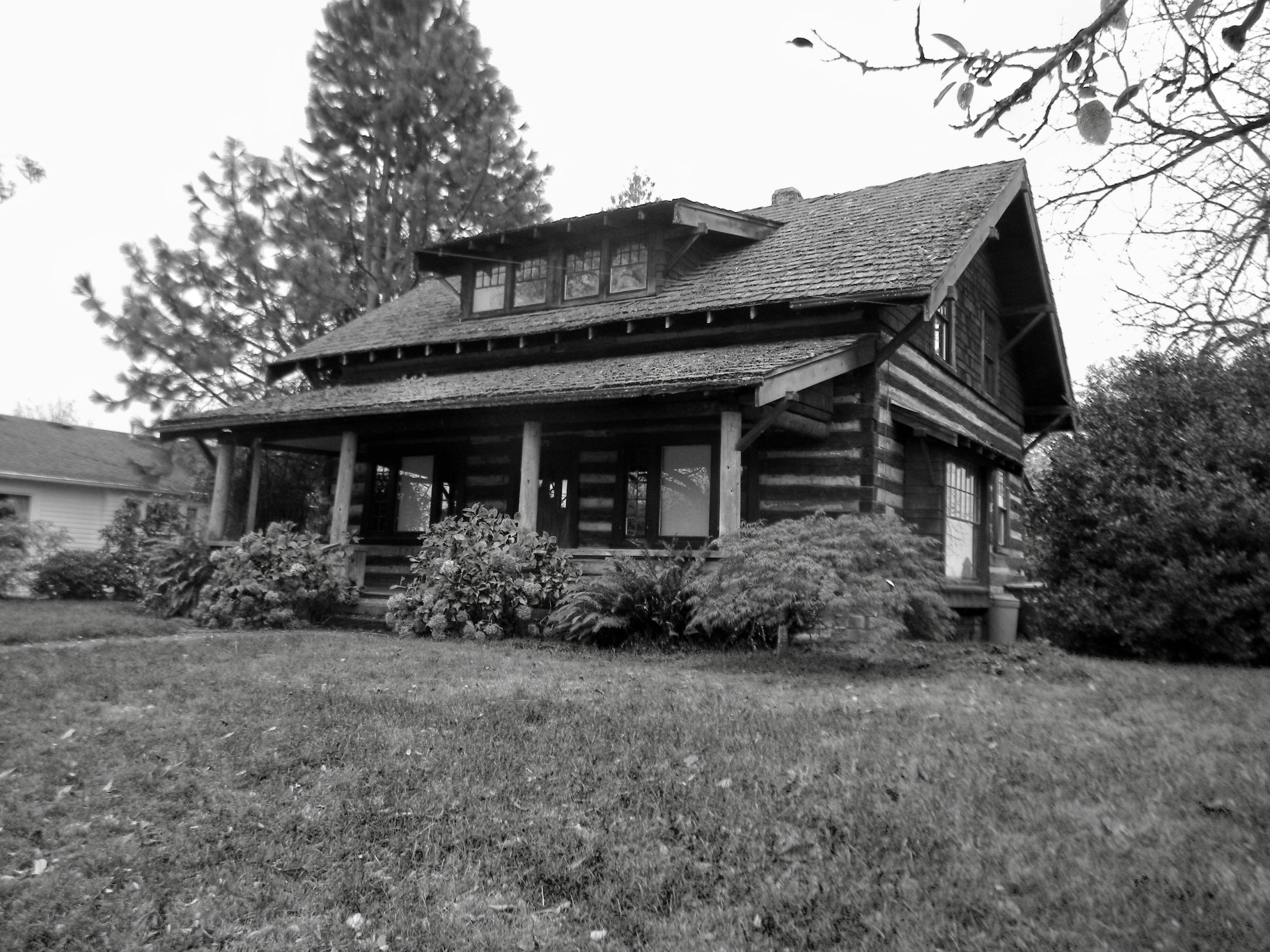
- O. B. McFadden House

- Location within Washington (state)
- Location: 475 S.W. Chehalis Avenue, Chehalis, Washington (Note: The original address, before a city wide change, was 1639 Chehalis Avenue)
- Coordinates: 46°39′29″N 122°57′54″W
- Area: less than one acre
- Built: 1859
- Architectural style: Bungalow log cabin
- NRHP reference No.: 75001861

Significant dates
- Added to NRHP: April 1, 1975
- Designated WSHR: April 1, 1975

The O. B. McFadden House is the historic home of Obadiah B. McFadden (Note: His first name is often spelled as "Obediah" in early reporting. See sources throughout the article.) and is located in Chehalis, Washington. The building was listed on the National Register of Historic Places (NRHP) in 1975 and is situated south of Millett Field.

The house is the oldest structure in Lewis County and the oldest residence in Chehalis. The McFadden's were a prominent family in Chehalis, purchasing the grounds in 1859 from the Saunders family, the founders of what later became Chehalis. The Saunders built the home as part of the purchase agreement. The home was used for a time during the late 1860s and into the 1870s as an early post office for the community. By 1911, the home was described to be in a dilapidated state and underwent a restoration; a second renovation began in 1982.

The log cabin home, built with mortise and tenon joinery, is considered either 1 1/2 or two stories and at its initial construction, contained 8 rooms. Due to age and numerous restorations and additions, the residence contains little of its early details though the exterior walls and some foundational support remain. No photographs have been found to document the original state of the home.

== History ==
O.B. McFadden and his wife, Margaret (Mary), purchased the property in 1859. The land, originally part of the Saunder's family settlement claim, was situated in a wilderness area. As part of the agreement, the Saunders, who were the founders of present-day Chehalis, built the home for the McFadden family.

The home was once used as the local post office for the town of Saundersville (also Saunder's Bottom), before it became known as Chehalis. Mary McFadden was the postmaster between 1867 and 1870, with John serving as such until 1874.

Repairs to the dwelling were undertaken by a homeowner in 1911, as the building was described to be in a dilapidated state. A city council representative, Howard Miller, owned the home for several decades and undertook a restoration in 1982.

== Architecture and features ==
The home is a 1 1/2 story to two-story log cabin bungalow built with mortise and tenon construction of hewed-logs. At its original build, it contained eight rooms, including four bedrooms in the attic, or second floor, and had 10 foot (3.0 metres) ceilings.

Due to its age and renovations since its construction, the home retains little of its original build, but the exterior walls and some floor support remains intact. The mortise and tenon joints are considered unusual, but provide a solidity to the structure. During one of the restorations, a dormer was added and at other points the house was placed on a post foundation and two porches were built. No photographs have been found to show the O.B. McFadden home in its original state.

== Significance ==
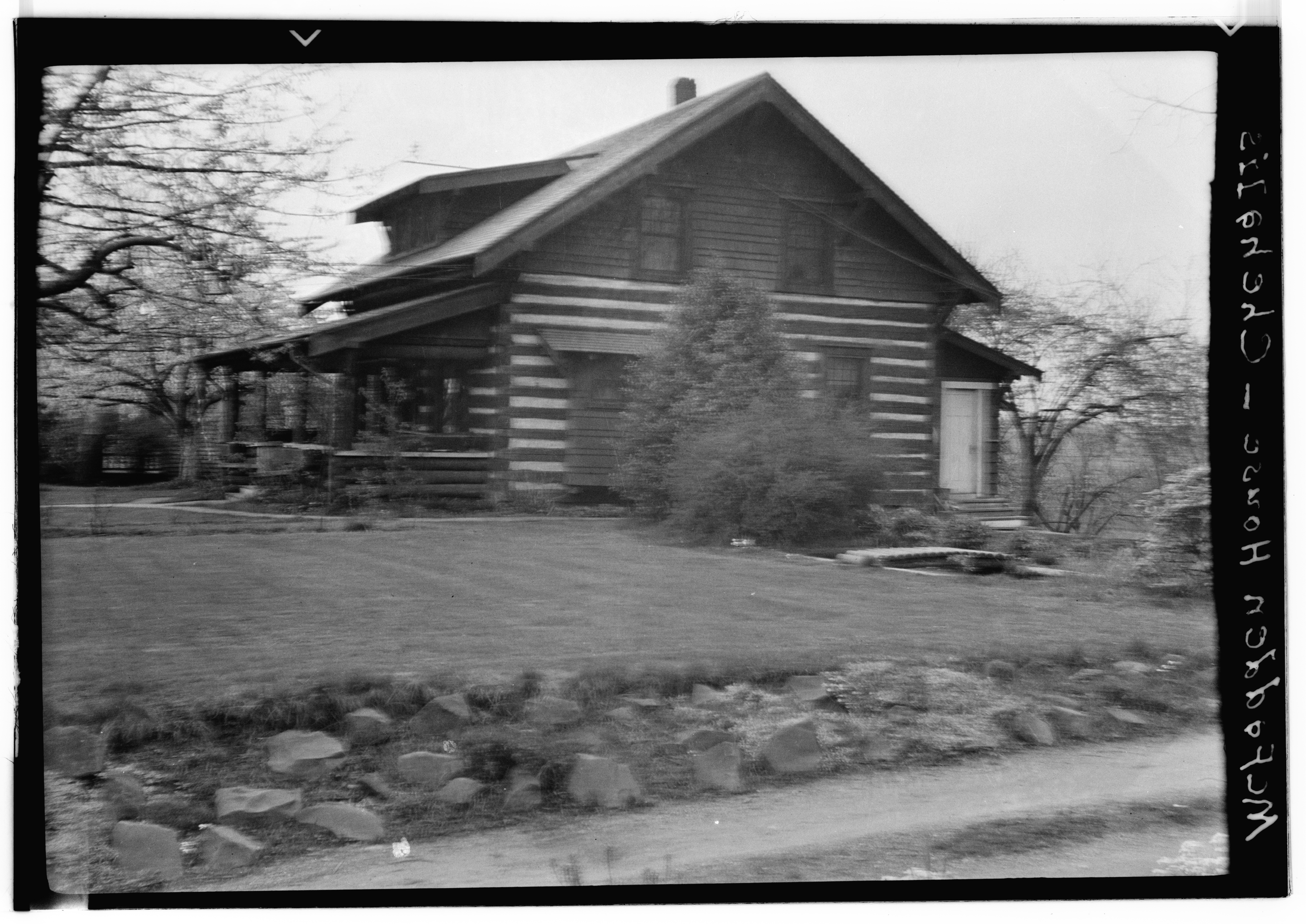
O. B. McFadden House, HABS WASH,21-CHEHA,1-1

The house was officially accepted to the National Register of Historic Places, and the Washington State Heritage Register, on April 1, 1975. The home is considered the oldest structure in Lewis County and the longest continuously occupied residence in the state. As of 2025, the McFadden House was one of eleven NRHP sites in the city of Chehalis.

== See also ==
- O. K. Palmer House
