= Conditional limitation =

Conditional Limitation, in law, is a phrase used in two senses.

(1) The qualification annexed to the grant of an estate or interest in land, providing for the determination of that grant or interest upon a particular contingency happening. An estate with such a limitation can endure only until the particular contingency happens; it is a present interest, to be divested on a future contingency. The grant of an estate to a man so long as he is parson of Dale, or while he continues unmarried, are instances of conditional limitations of estates for life.

(2) A use or interest in land limited to take effect upon a given contingency. For instance, a grant to X. and his heirs to the use of A., provided that when C. returns from Rome the land shall go to the use of B. in fee simple. B. is said to take under a conditional limitation, operating by executory devise or springing or shifting use.

In American law, this creates a fee simple on condition subsequent.
