= John Dobson and McFadden Parks =

Park in Chehalis, Washington

- Interactive map of John Dobson and McFadden Parks
- Address: Chehalis, Washington
- Coordinates: 46°39′47″N 122°57′30″W46°39′41″N 122°57′03″W

John Dobson and McFadden Parks were once the center of the Chehalis, Washington park system and they were referred to by residents as the "Top-of-the-Hill" parks due to their proximity to one another. They are the two oldest non-athletic parks in Chehalis. Begun as memorials to well respected Chehalis residents, they are located in the Hillside Historic District on Park Hill, above and east of the Chehalis Downtown Historic District. The parks are connected by the Dobson-McFadden Trail and the Troop 373 and 7373 Scout Lodge is often considered part of John Dobson Park.

Despite the local community continuing to legally use the parks, they are technically closed as the city does not budget for maintenance except for efforts to clear brush to lower the risk of wildfire.

== John Dobson Park ==
John Dobson Park
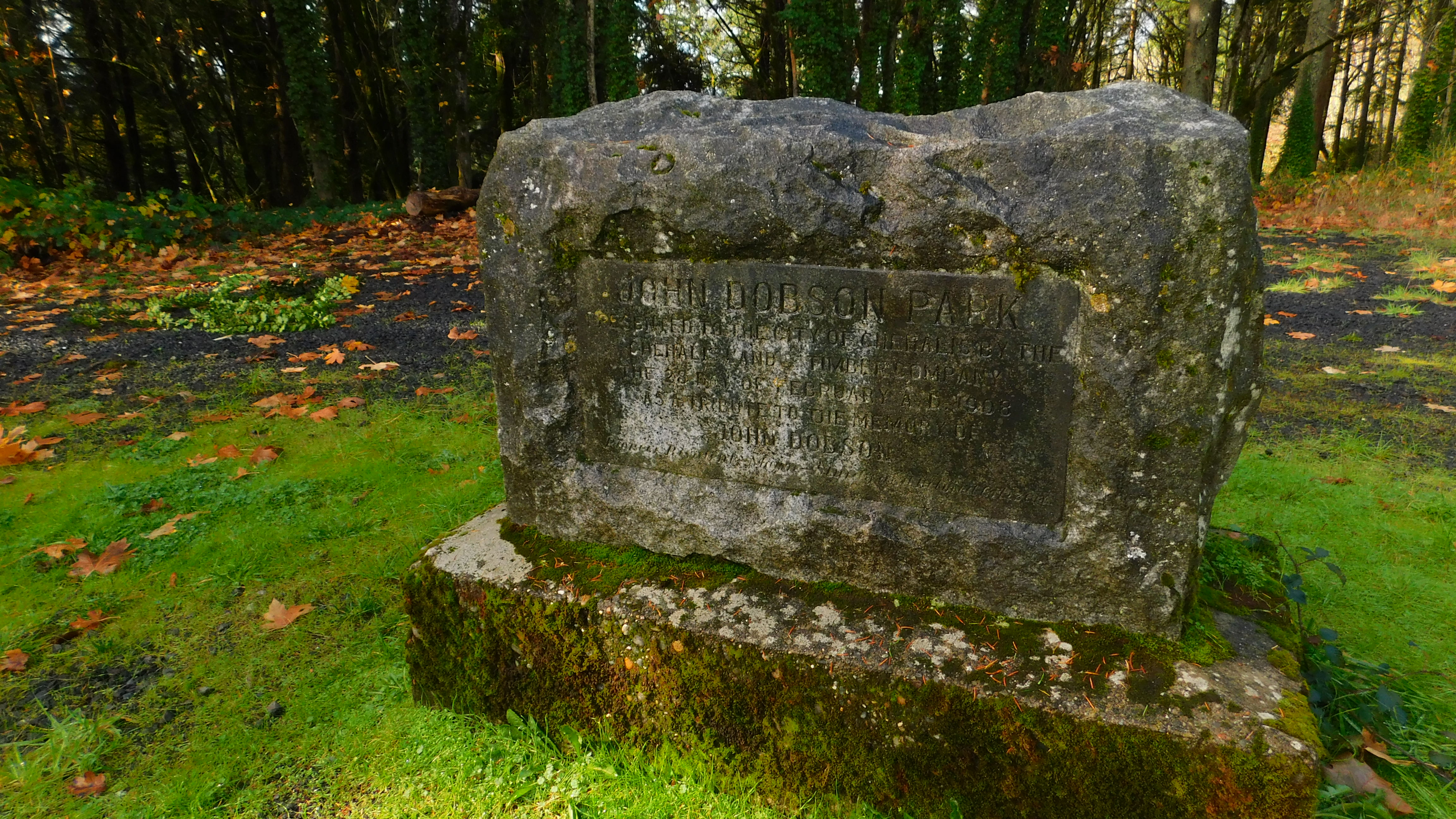
- Dedication marker at John Dobson Park
- Type: Picnic, hiking
- Area: 15.5 acres (6.3 ha)
- Created: 1908
- Founder: Chehalis Land & Timber Company
- Status: Closed; trail is open
- Hiking trails: Dobson-McFadden Trail
- Habitats: Forested
- Parking: Limited
- Facilities: Scout Lodge (closed)

John Dobson Park was named after a local farmer who became a prominent Chehalis banker. Donated by the Chehalis Land & Timber Company in his name in 1908 after his death, (Note: The park is mentioned in some sources as being donated in 1905, but Mr. Dobson's death, caused by being thrown from an automobile, was recorded in 1907.) the initial plot was 15.5-acres (6.3 ha) and the park has had various listings of its acreage, reaching up to 26-acres (11 ha) in size. The city officially received the deed to the park in 1924.

Despite repeated plans to cultivate the land into a park by early Chehalis park commissions, the area would be consistently listed for years as undeveloped. The grounds, which included several small gulches, were described as being heavily wooded with firs combined with a mix of dense shrubs and various deciduous trees. By 1914, early work on a reservoir began and plans included the build of a road over the hill into the Coal Creek district, bridges over the ravines, and installation of tennis courts. Additional ideas included a waterfall and pooling system integrated into the water retention project. By 1919, the reservoir had been completed but only a few picnic amenities were added and most of the underbrush had been removed.

In 1923, the city authorized the creation and placement of a concrete marker on the grounds in honor of John Dobson; the monument cost $100. By the following year, a lack of oversight and questions of deed ownership led to the unauthorized cutting of 50 trees on the land. No major improvements were completed until a larger reservoir, with a capacity of 1,000,000 US gallons (3,800,000 L; 830,000 imp gal), was built on the site in the 1920s. The reservoir would be expanded to 5,000,000 US gallons (19,000,000 L; 4,200,000 imp gal) in 1927.

A formal dedication of the park was held in July 1933, and the land was listed as being increased to 22.0 acres (8.9 ha). Interest in building up the park was reinvigorated, with the city making early, but ultimately unrealized, plans to build a swimming pool on the Dobson tract in the mid-1930s. Construction of a community recreational building and playgrounds, including the Troop 373 and 7373 Scout Lodge, was begun in 1937 as part of the Works Progress Administration. A water filtration plant was built on the grounds in 1960.

== McFadden Park ==
McFadden Park
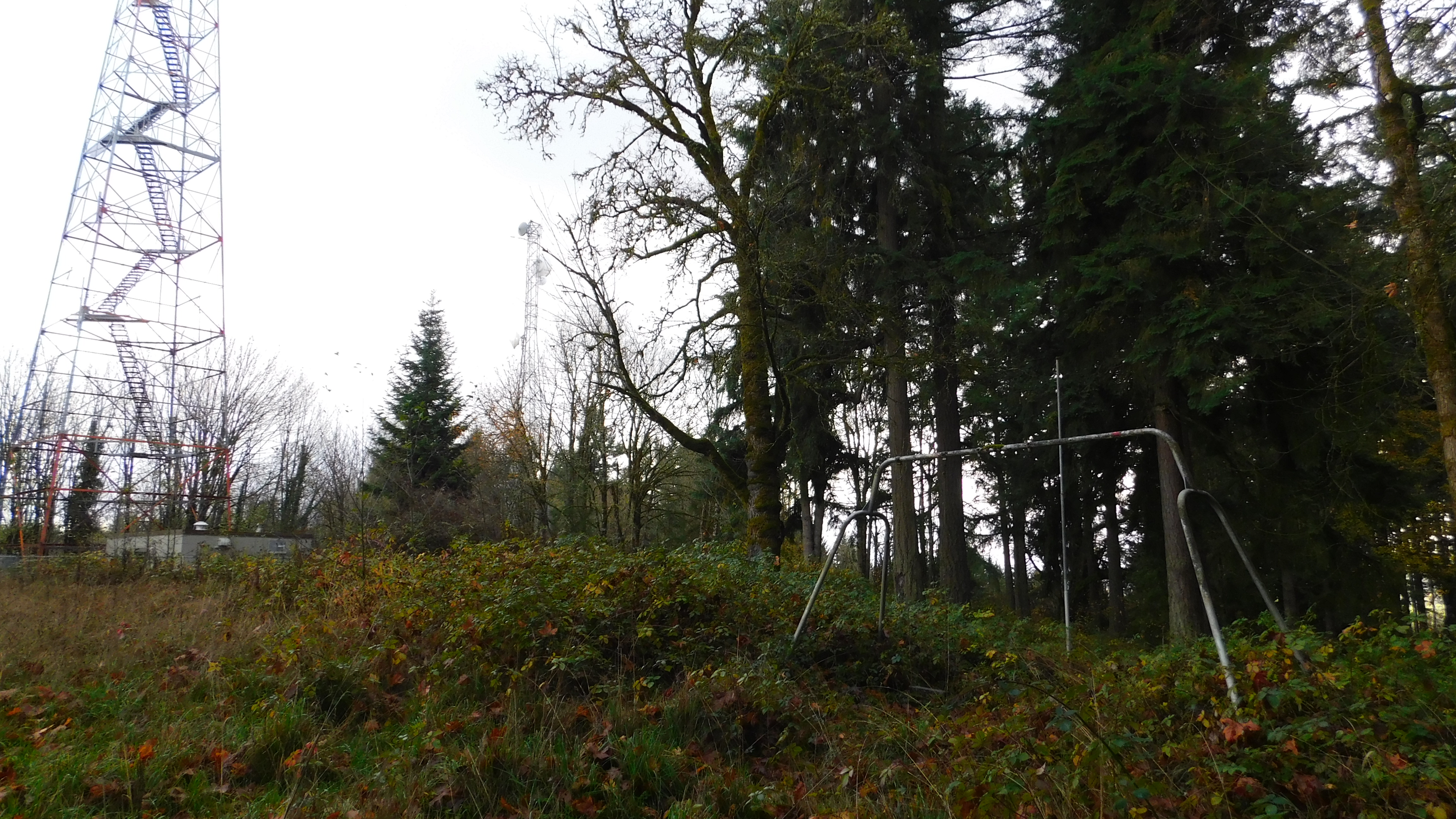
- Antenna tower and the last remaining remnants of playground equipment at McFadden Park
- Type: Picnic, hiking
- Area: 28 acres (11 ha)
- Elevation: 642 feet (195.7 m)
- Created: 1912
- Founder: Family of Obadiah B. McFadden
- Status: Closed; trail is open
- Hiking trails: Dobson-McFadden Trail
- Habitats: Forested
- Parking: Limited
- Facilities: None

McFadden Park began in 1912 as a donation to the city in memory of Obadiah B. McFadden, a Washington Territory Supreme Court judge. The area was rededicated in 1945 by Mr. McFadden's grandson, Winlock Miller, and a plaque presented for the site. The area encompasses 28 acres (11 ha) with views of Mt. Rainier and the Olympic Mountains. The park has been outfitted and improved over the years with a covered kitchen, picnic areas, trails, and playgrounds.

Various improvements to the site took place in the early 1960s to open the park up for public use. In 1960, a main rim road, looping around the site, was constructed, as was a kitchen facility, parking lot, and a clearing of brush and timber was begun, specifically to provide views of the city and the Cascades. The following year a large logging project to clear the grounds of fallen or potentially dangerous trees was initiated. A water filtration plant for the city was finalized later in 1961. Along with Dobson, McFadden Park was closed at the beginning of the 1963 park season for repairs due to damages from the Columbus Day storm of 1962.

By 1973, due to costs associated with pervasive and destructive vandalism to the kitchen and picnic areas, the city announced that no further repairs were to be attempted. In addition to vandalism, McFadden Park's location and competition from newer recreational areas in Chehalis, led to the park being considered closed by the city in the late 1980s. Several antenna towers dominate over the site.

McFadden Park contains a variety of tree species, including cedars, dogwoods, maples, and Douglas fir. Wildlife includes deer and a variety of birds, such as grouse and pheasant.

== Dobson-McFadden Trail ==
Dobson-McFadden Trail
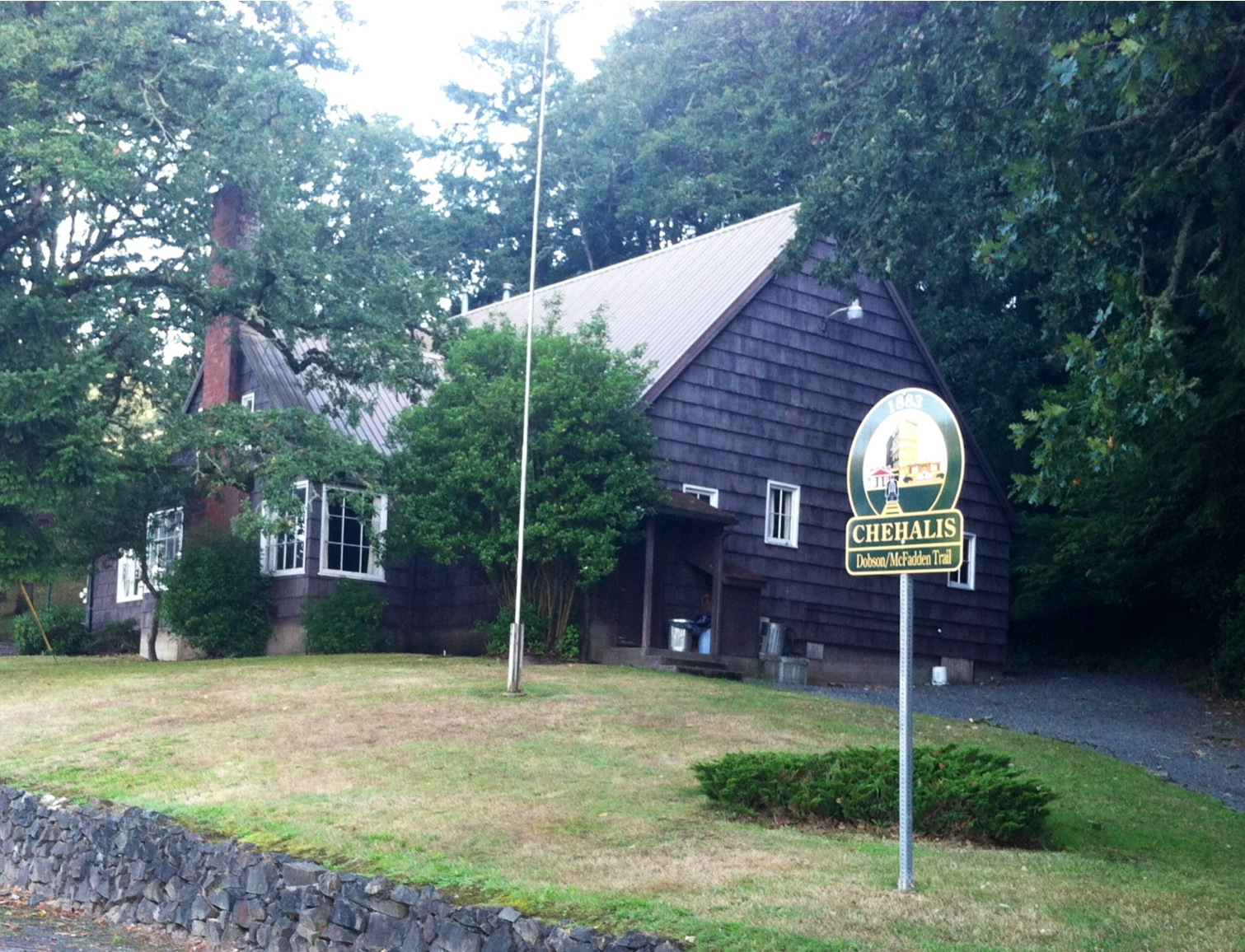
- Troop 373 and 7373 Scout Lodge near the Dobson-McFadden trailhead
- Length: 1.3 miles (2.1 km)
- Use: Hiking
- Elevation gain/loss: 360 feet (109.7 m)
- Elevation change: Steep
- Difficulty: Easy to moderate
- Hazards: Overgrowth, steep incline at beginning of trail
- Surface: Bark, soil, gravel
- Maintainer: Chehalis Parks and Recreation
- Website: Chehalis Parks and Recreation - Dobson-McFadden Trail

A trail, the Dobson-McFadden, is accessible at the National Register of Historic Places listed Troop 373 and 7373 Scout Lodge. The trail is 1.3 miles (2.1 km) long with an elevation gain of 360 feet (109.7 m) as it bridges the parks and leads to open views to much of Chehalis, including downtown, and the Newaukum River valley.

== See also ==
- Parks and recreation in Chehalis, Washington
