= William Muir Urquhart =

American businessman

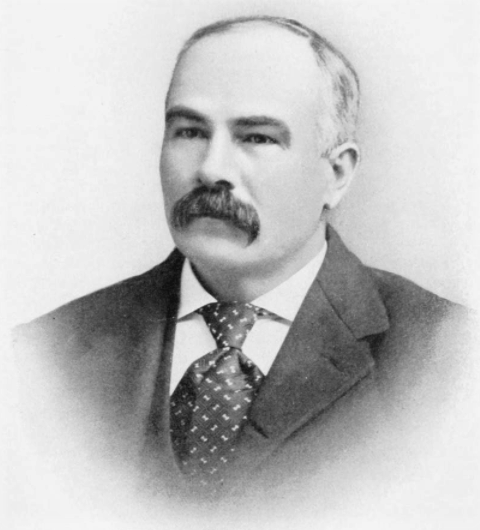
- Born: December 22, 1855; Cutting's Prairie, Lewis County, Washington Territory
- Died: April 14, 1933 (aged 77); Chehalis, Washington, U.S.
- Burial place: Fernhill (Urquhart) Cemetery
- Occupations: Businessman, public servant

William Muir Urquhart (December 22, 1855 – April 14, 1933) was an American entrepreneur, businessman, and public servant. For many years he was treasurer of Lewis County, Washington. He also served as mayor, councilman, and postmaster of Chehalis, Washington, where he lived and worked for more than fifty years.

He was a merchant, banker, railroad entrepreneur, land developer and timber company investor. He was instrumental in planning the layout the business district of Chehalis in the early days of the city.

== Early life ==
Urquhart was born in Cutting's Prairie, north of the Columbia River in the newly created Washington Territory, a vast area of wilderness which had been separated from the Oregon Territory by an Act of Congress in 1853. He was the first member of his family born in the United States. His father, James Urquhart, left Scotland in 1851, taking a ship to New York City, and traveling on foot to New Orleans and by boat up the Mississippi River to Iowa, before joining a wagon train and heading west on the Oregon Trail.

Urquhart's mother and five older brothers and sisters reunited with James Urquhart in early 1855. They traveled around Cape Horn to San Francisco and then to the mouth of the Columbia River by ship, where they transferred to canoes for the last leg of their journey up the Cowlitz River. The trip took them over six months. Urquhart was born later that year in a house his father had built on land he had acquired through a Donation Claim. As the Urquhart family continued to grow in size, they added additional acreage to their holdings and tended to a variety of crops and animals for their own use and for the markets of Olympia on the Puget Sound. Like his ten siblings who grew to maturity, Urquhart became skilled at all aspects of farm work on the frontier.

When Urquhart was eighteen years old, his father added to the family's real estate holdings when he purchased a large tract of land that included a small store and its merchandise. James Urquhart opened a general store which he ran with his son, John, and .aid out a town which he named Napavine. In addition to farm work, Urquhart began to clerk in the store learning the merchant's trade. In 1878 his older brother, John, moved six miles north to Chehalis where he opened a store of his own. John was also the Treasurer of Lewis County and involved in making Chehalis a main stop of the new railroad as well as the county seat. John's sudden and unexpected death changed the course of Urquhart's life.

== Career ==
When his older brother died in 1880, Urquhart moved to Chehalis to take over the store. He was 25 years old. Chehalis was just beginning a period of great growth. For the next fifty years he lived in Chehalis and was involved many aspects of the city's growth. When Urquhart arrived the buildings were mainly wood. In 1889, he expanded his business and constructed a large brick building for his merchandise house.

He joined a group of businessmen who formed the National Bank of Chehalis (later Coffman & Dobson) and built a large brick building to house it. He was part of the Chehalis Land and Timber Company which was responsible for much of the planning and growth during the ensuing years. For eight years he was the Treasurer of Lewis County; he served as Mayor of Chehalis and also as Councilman; and he was Postmaster for a number of years.

== Personal life ==
In 1881 William Urquhart married Anna Manning whose pioneer parents had settled near Winlock, not far from Napavine. Anna's father, Joseph P. Manning, had crossed on the Oregon trail in 1848. His future wife, Caroline Aubert, was part of the same wagon train. Urquhart and Anna had four children—James, William, Helen, Louise—who lived in very different circumstance than their pioneer parents. In 1895, Urquhart and his siblings prevented his 75-year old father from marrying 15-year old Myrtle Blanchard, who filed a breach of promise lawsuit on what was to be the wedding day.

The house the Urquharts built in 1902 on Pennsylvania Avenue is today part of the National Register of Historic Places. He served for many years as a trustee at the Westminster Presbyterian Church in Chehalis as well as a number of other civic and fraternal organizations.

His wife, Anna, died suddenly on February 16, 1920 at their home in the Pennsylvania Avenue-West Side Historic District in Chehalis. Urquhart also died at their historic home on April 14, 1933. They are buried at Fernhill (Urquhart) Cemetery just a few miles from downtown Chehalis. The couple had donated the land for the cemetery and provided a fund for its upkeep.
