= James Urquhart =

American businessman and politician

- Born: March 15, 1822; Dingwall, Ross-Shire, Scotland
- Died: February 23, 1901 (aged 78)
- Occupation(s): Businessman, public servant
- Spouse: Helen Muir
- Children: 12

James Urquhart (March 15, 1822 – February 23, 1901) served three terms in the Washington Territory legislature. He was also elected to three terms as a county commissioner in Lewis County, Washington. He was a delegate to the Washington State Constitutional Convention. In 1873, he laid out the town of Napavine where he was Postmaster and ran the general store. He chose the town's name from the Indian word "napavoon" meaning small prairie.

== Early life ==
Urquhart was born in Dingwall, Ross-Shire, Scotland. Cromarty and the Black Isle had been the home of the Clan Urquhart since ancient times. He left Ross-shire as a teenager going first to Arbroath on the North Sea coast where he learned the merchant's trade in an uncle's store. He then moved on to Linlithgow where he worked on the new railroad that was being constructed, married a local girl by the name of Helen Muir, and started a family of his own.

== Emigrant to America ==
In 1851 Urquhart left his growing family in Scotland and sailed to New York City. He crossed the country, initially traveling through the antebellum south on foot to New Orleans, then up the Mississippi River by boat, and finally joining a wagon train and heading west on the Oregon Trail to the Oregon Territory. After working at several different jobs along the Columbia River, he filed a Donation Claim, homesteaded north of the river and voted in the first election in the newly created Washington Territory. His wife and children joined him in early 1855, sailing around Cape Horn on a journey that took six months.

== Washington Territory ==
In 1855 the Washington Territory was thinly populated. The Urquhart family set off into the wilderness by canoe on the Cowlitz River, settling near Cutting's prairie. By 1870 seven additional Urquhart children (six survived infancy) had been added to five who had journeyed from Scotland with their mother. The entire family cleared fields, raised animals and crops and honed the skills of pioneer living. Urquhart served in the Lewis County militia in 1856. Because he had good relations with the local tribes, he did not take his family to the block house at Claquato for protection during the Yakima Indian uprisings of 1855-6. By 1873 James Urquhart had greatly expanded his land holdings. He purchased a small outpost and the merchandise of his pioneer neighbor H. H. Pinto and laid out a town around it. He named the town Napavine. He ran the general store for many years and saw the railroad come to his town. He was three times elected to the Territorial Legislature, was appointed Postmaster, was a county commissioner and a delegate to the constitutional convention, and served on the school board.

== Later life ==
He returned to Scotland for a brief visit after the death of his wife of 51 years. In 1895, 75-year old Urquhart was prevented by his children from marrying 15-year old Myrtle Blanchard. Blanchard subsequently filed a breach of promise lawsuit on what was to be the wedding day.

== Family in public service ==
In his book "History of the Puget Sound Country" William Farrand Prosser, one of the founders of the Washington Historical Society, wrote personal histories of many prominent pioneers and their families. James Urquhart and his son William Muir Urquhart were both profiled in this book. William had served as Mayor of Chehalis, a town he and his business associates had played a role in developing. He also served as Postmaster and Treasurer of Lewis County. His brother John held these same two positions before his premature death. His brother David became Auditor of Lewis County and another brother, Henry, served many years as Lewis County Sheriff.
