= Henderson Park (Chehalis, Washington) =

Park in Chehalis, Washington

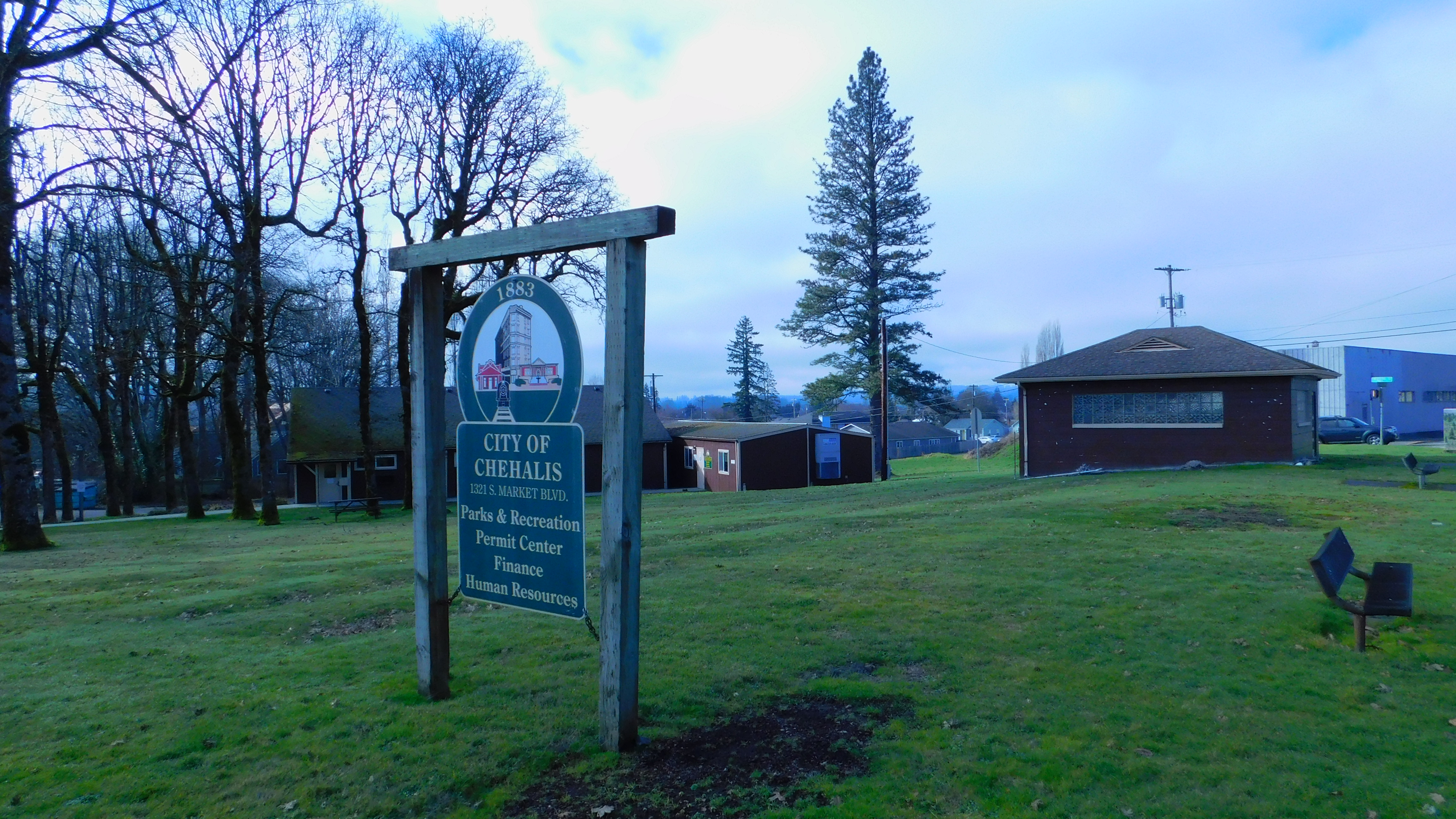

- Location within Washington (state)
- Type: Picnic, community assembly
- Location: 1321 S. Market Boulevard, Chehalis, Washington
- Coordinates: 46°39′12″N 122°57′11″W
- Area: 1-acre (0.40 ha)
- Established: 1962
- Status: Open
- Hiking trails: 0
- Paths: Sidewalks
- Terrain: Flat
- Water: None
- Plants: Roses
- Public transit: Lewis County Transit
- Facilities: Chehalis government buildings

Henderson Park is located in Chehalis, Washington in the city's South Market district and is a block northeast of nearby Recreation Park.

The 1-acre (0.40 ha) park contains several buildings used by various city government divisions, most notably the Chehalis Parks and Recreation Department, and serves as a command center during city emergencies.

== History ==
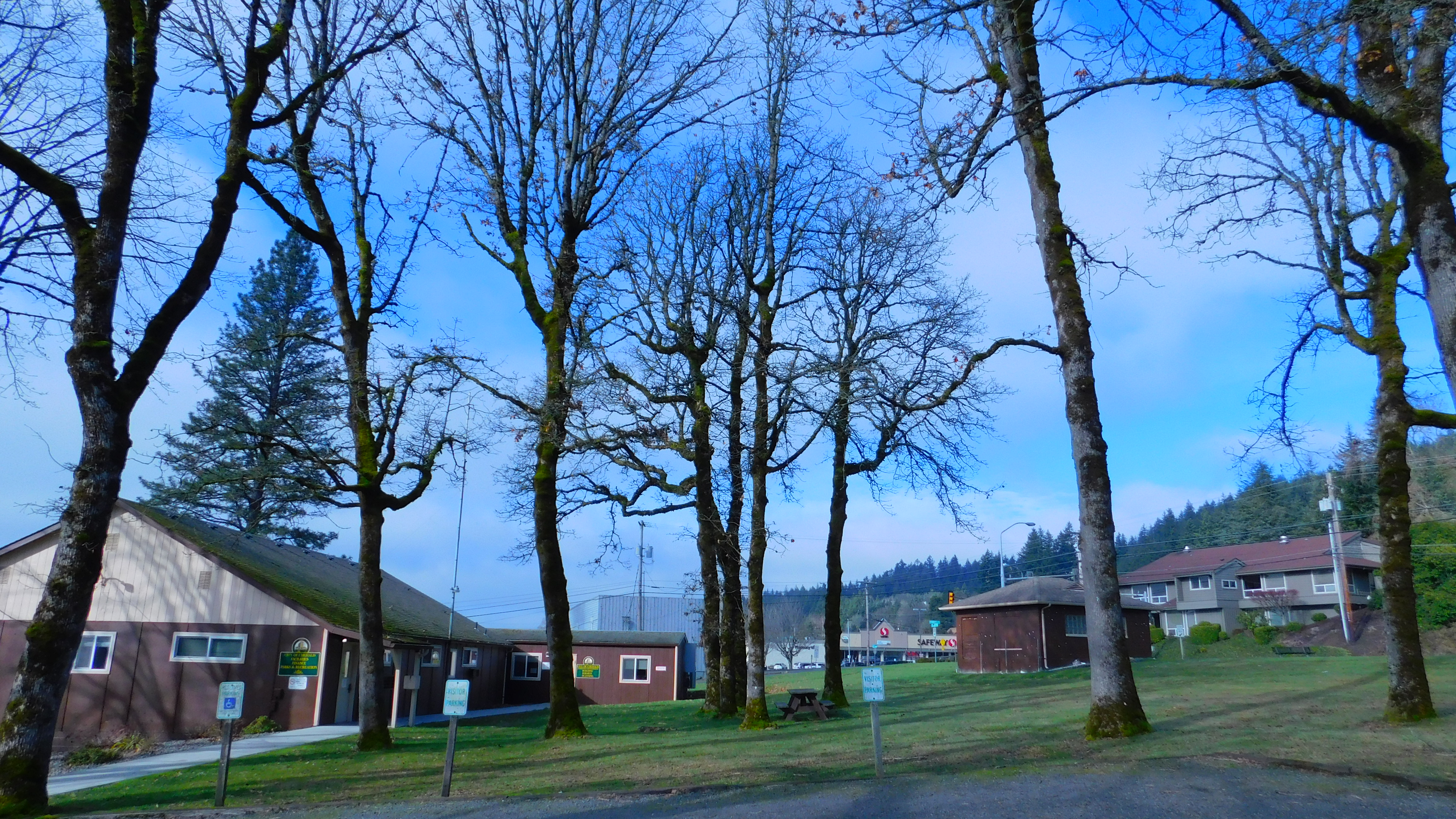
City government buildings, pumphouse, and "clump of trees", 2022

The plat for Henderson Park, described as featuring a "pretty clump of trees," was originally offered to the city in 1906. The land was officially donated to Chehalis by the Henderson Lumber Company in 1908 but forgotten by the city until 1913, though the area was treated as a park by local residents. The park was not formally recognized by the city until 1916. Full ownership was given to Chehalis, by deed, in 1962.

During its early history, the grounds served as an automobile stop, marketplace, picnic area, and playground. At the end of 1916, the city commissioners, led by the actions of a local auto club, began to convert the land into a park for automobile travelers. The grounds were slightly expanded in 1923 when the city authorized the purchase of nearby residential lots to add to the park. Improvements, actual and planned, were begun in the mid-1920s and into the 1930s, first with a concrete concession stand in 1924 and the planting of Hawthorne trees the following year. A log lodge, with an original footprint of 28 ft × 72 ft (8.5 m × 21.9 m), was introduced as a possible rest area for travelers in 1933. The lodge was planned to be modern for the times and was to contain a dance floor and host a large front porch. The combination rest area and recreation building was never constructed.

Henderson Park, along with other recreation spots in the city, received a small Works Progress Administration (WPA) grant for improvements and the addition of playground equipment in 1937. In early 1938, the Henderson Park Garden Club was first organized. By the 1940s, the space began to be primarily utilized for the State Department of Natural Resources and then later by the Chehalis fire department and the Jaycees.

A crab apple tree known as the Saunders Tree was replanted at Henderson Park in early 1968. Originally located at Market and 4th Street, the tree grew from a graft made in 1870 by an unnamed Native American boy and Joseph Saunders, the youngest son of the city’s founding family. Due to a widening project on Market Street, a move of the tree was necessitated. The tree thrived at first but there was a lack of fruit and leaf growth as the summer season passed. The pioneer tree, most likely part of the Saunder's family orchard on the Hillside Historic District, was reported to have died a year or two later. Cuttings were taken and planted at the Chehalis park system's office.

Rose bushes were dispersed through the site during a transfer of plantings from the closure of the Chehalis Municipal Rose Garden but the roses did not flourish.

=== Gingerbread house ===
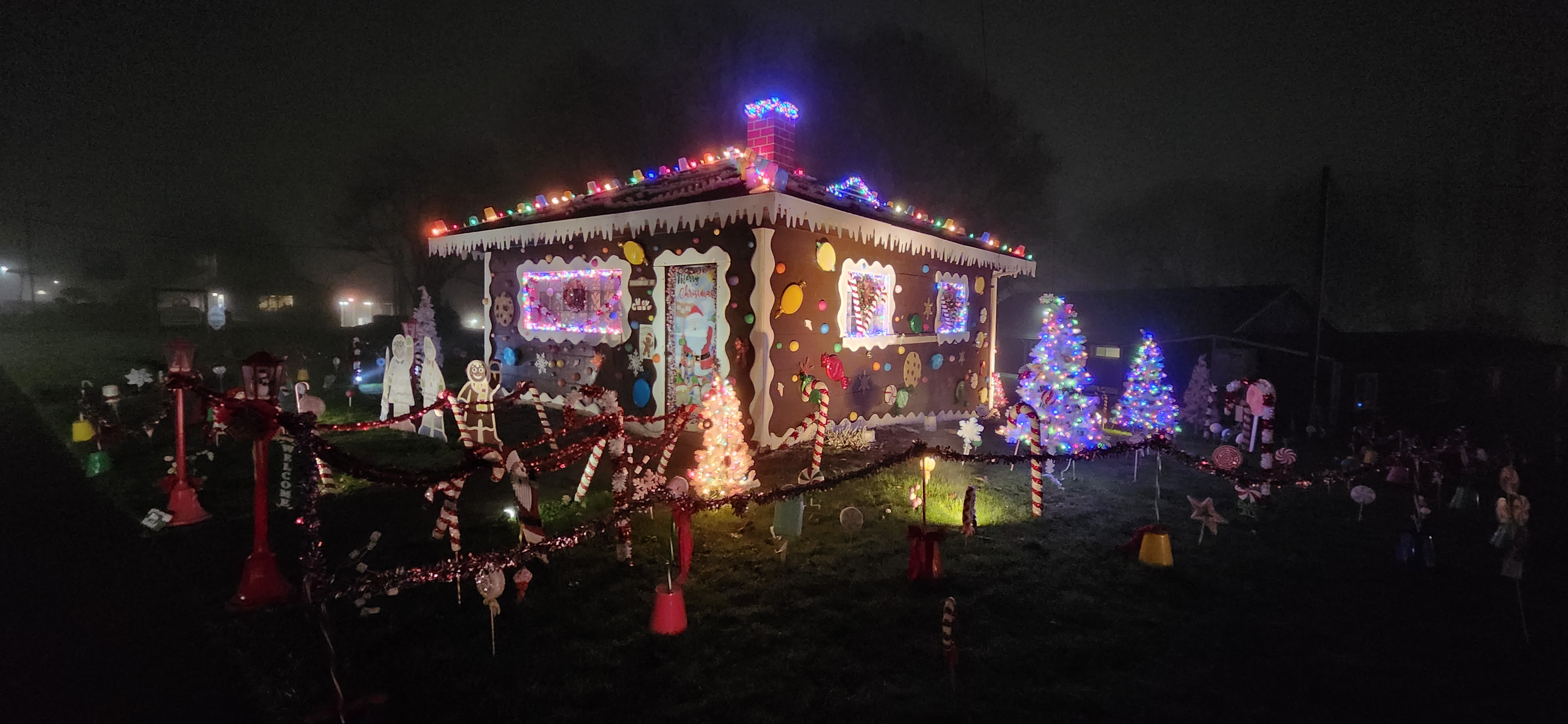
Gingerbread House, 2025

Beginning in 2009, as an offshoot of the city's Christmas decorations, the park's pump house is dressed by volunteers as a gingerbread house during the winter holiday season. A former Chehalis councilman, Terry Harris, and his family hand-craft decorations either to be placed on the grounds or attached to the structure.

== See also ==
- Parks and recreation in Chehalis, Washington
