= Parks and recreation in Chehalis, Washington =

Parks and recreation

Parks and recreation in Chehalis, Washington is administered by the Chehalis Parks and Recreation Department. Trails that connect Chehalis with locations beyond the city limits are maintained in conjunction with other local jurisdictions, state government agencies, and/or local non-profit groups and volunteers.

The city contains eleven parks, many of which were created on land donated by local citizens. Millett Field, begun in 1898, is the oldest park still in use. The newest addition to the city's park and recreation program, Stan Hedwall Park, was acquired in 2014. A large donation in 2004 to restore Alexander Park has led to more than half of the parks being renovated or rebuilt, almost exclusively by volunteer efforts. Funding for this undertaking was secured thru government grants, charitable acts of local businesses, and citizen fundraising.

Residents and visitors have access to approximately 273 acres (110 ha) (Note: The total, listed acreage varies by source. Reports may omit or include undeveloped or unusable land attached to an existing park, or may not report acreage on a park deemed as closed. See sources throughout the page.) of parks built for leisure, children's activities, water access, or athletics, along with numerous trails and footpaths providing over 75 miles (121 km) of walking, hiking, horse riding, and biking recreation. Chehalis provides 4 times the minimal, satisfactory levels for park acreage for a community similar to that of the city's population.

== Parks ==
The city, incorporated since 1883, had been without a city park from its inception and throughout the remainder of the 19th century. Despite sporting events taking place as early as 1896 on grounds that would become Millett Field, and attempts to donate Duffy Park in the 1880s, no official park yet existed. In 1898, an opinion piece in the town newspaper, The Chehalis Bee, coupled with a request from the city council for landowners to donate parcels for recreation purposes, helped to start a community parks program.

Chehalis has a long tradition of citizen fundraising to purchase, build, and maintain its parks. Early parks were funded via a subscription service. A long serving parks superintendent, Stan Hedwall, was known as "Mr. Sign Man" due to his nature of building signage for existing parks during his oversight in the mid-20th century. Hedwall published a book in 1962 to promote the Chehalis park system and community pool. Titled, Why Battle Seattle? 90 Minutes To The Fair. Relax In Chehalis, it was provided to visitors during the 1962 Seattle World's Fair.

In the 21st century, a collaboration of Chehalis residents, the city government, various service clubs, and local organizations such as the Chehalis Foundation, the Lewis County Community Trails Association, and Experience Chehalis (previously the Chehalis Community Renaissance Team), have spearheaded endeavors to restore and renovate several of the parks.

The Chehalis Parks Department received $100,000 in funding from the Washington State Recreation and Conservation Office (RCO) in late 2023. The grant is to be used to procure machinery to maintain the fields and turf areas of Lintott-Alexander and Stan Hedwall parks, and to renovate the restrooms on the grounds of the Recreation Park Complex, also known as the Chehalis Sports Complex.

Name	Image	Established	Location	Size	Description
Chet and Henrietta Rhodes Spray Park		2007	South Market district	0.5 acres (0.20 ha)	Replaced a wading pool from the original 1959 aquatic center
Gail and Carolyn Shaw Aquatics Center		2014	South Market district	0.5 acres (0.20 ha)	Replaced the 1959 Chehalis Community Pool
Henderson Park		1962	South Market district	1.0 acre (0.40 ha)	Used as a command center for the city during emergencies
John Dobson Park		1908	Hillside District	15.5 acres (6.3 ha)	Trailhead for the Dobson-McFadden Trail is located near the Troop 373 and 7373 Scout Lodge
Lintott-Alexander Park		ca. 1920	Confluence of Chehalis and Newaukum Rivers	6.0 acres (2.4 ha)	Originally named Alexander Park, it was renovated in the early 2000's after a long closure
McFadden Park		1912	Hillside District	28.0 acres (11.3 ha)	Named after Obadiah B. McFadden
Millett Field		1898	South Market District	3.3 acres (1.3 ha)	Home to the Chehalis Gophers
Penny Playground		1993	South Market District	1.0 acre (0.40 ha)	Complete renovation and reopening, 2021
Recreation Park		1954	South Market District	13.0 acres (5.3 ha)	Major renovation and reopening, 2021
Stan Hedwall Park		2014	West Chehalis	204 acres (83 ha)	Largest park in Chehalis
Westside Park		ca. 1949	Pennsylvania Avenue-West Side Historic District	1.0 acre (0.40 ha)	Originally a playground for an elementary school that was razed due to damages from the 1949 Olympia earthquake

== Preserves and wetlands ==
The Chehalis Poplar Tree Farm is owned by the city.

After the city purchased the poplar tree farm property, a 120-acre (49 ha) portion was set aside as a wetland mitigation site. Another wetland site, purchased by Chehalis in 1997 and spanning 66 acres (27 ha), is located off National Avenue and is used similarly as a mitigation area.

== Trails ==
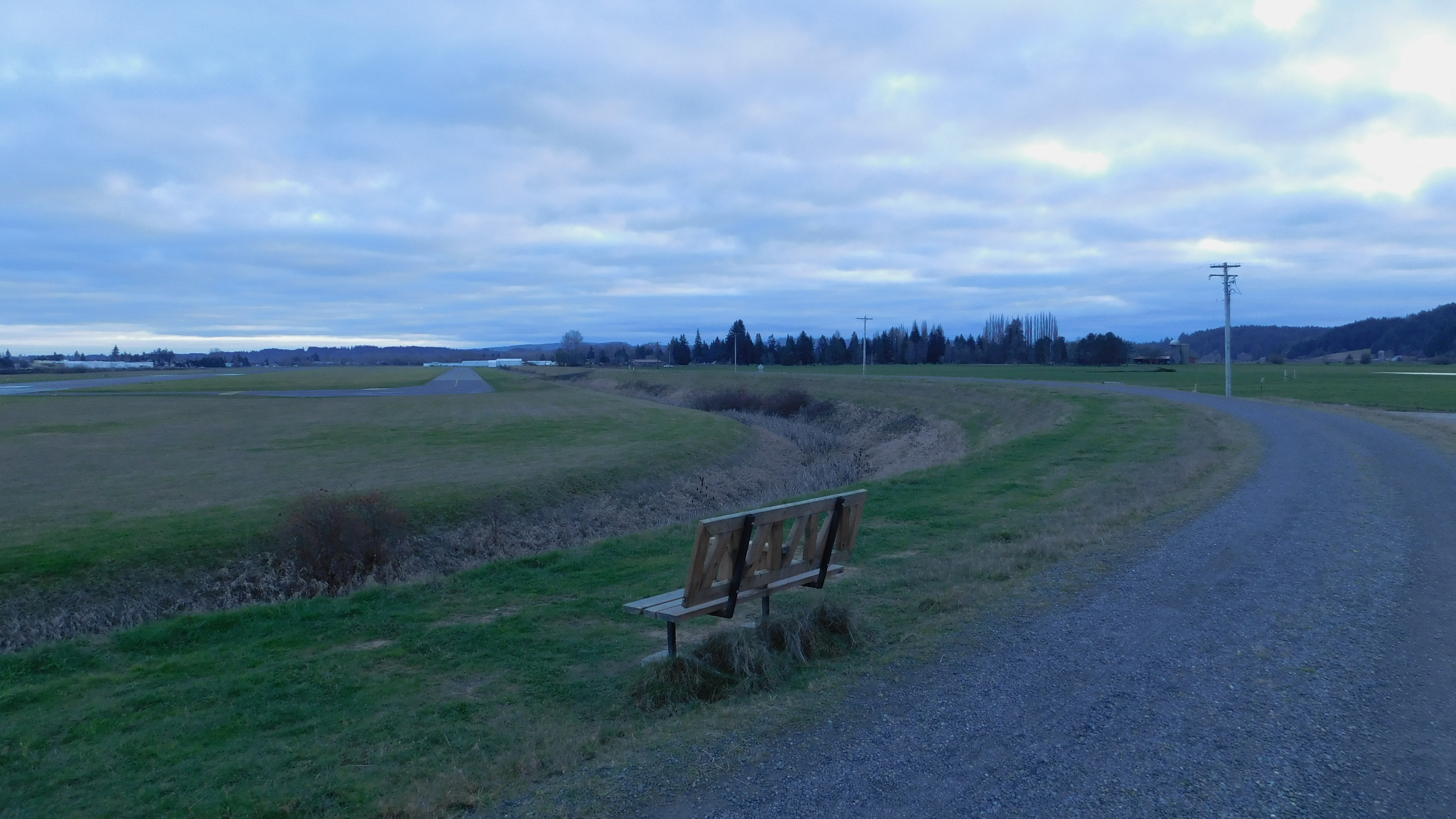
Airport Levee Trail, Chehalis, Washington, January 2022

Outside of the Dobson-McFadden Trail, the trails at Stan Hedwall, and footpaths located within the Recreation Park complex, the city has three significant trails, two of which extend beyond the municipality. A non-profit group, the Lewis County Community Trails Association, was organized in 2006 to help coordinate the creation of trails within the city and Lewis County. There were plans to create a trail connecting the Port of Chehalis to Stan Hedwall Park and nearby tourist locations in the 2000s, but despite a small feasibility study, the project did not proceed. Future plans include linking recreational areas in Chehalis to parks and trails in Centralia, ultimately connecting the entire system with the Willapa Hills Trail.

=== Airport Levee Trail ===
The trail is mixed paved-gravel built atop a levee and loops for 3.5 miles (5.6 km) around the Chehalis-Centralia Airport and Twin City Town Center. Built in large part by community efforts and $300,000 in funding from TransAlta, the trail was first available for use in 2010. The trail provides views of the Riverside Golf Course, airport, and farmland, with views of the Chehalis River.

=== Airport Road Trail ===
The mixed-use paved trail is 1.4 miles (2.3 km) and runs parallel to Interstate 5 to the east, with farmland and close views of the Chehalis River to the west. Completed in 2014, the south trailhead links with the Airport Levee Trail and continues north, passing over Salzer Creek and into Centralia, officially terminating at the Twin Transit Mellen Street station. Future plans include building ramps to an existing pedestrian portion of the I-5 bridge over the Skookumchuck River which would link the trail to Fort Borst Park and other recreational areas in Centralia.

=== Willapa Hills Trail ===
At 56 miles (90 km), the intercounty trail is part of the Willapa Hills State Park and stretches from Chehalis to South Bend, Washington. It is built over a decommissioned railroad. The trail journeys near or thru such Lewis County towns as Adna, Claquato, Ceres, Doty, and McCormick, while passing by the ghost town of Walville. A spur allows users to traverse thru Rainbow Falls State Park near Dryad. Mostly complete within Lewis County, with a mix of pavement and compact gravel, the trail is considered unimproved for large stretches in Pacific County. The trail is under the maintenance auspices of the Washington State Park System and is open for non-motorized activities year round to hikers, bicyclists, and horse riding.

== Defunct and extinct parks ==
=== Chehalis Band Park ===
The park began in 1904 under the purchase and operation of a local organized band, the Chehalis Concert Band. It was located near the northern city limits on National Avenue and was split by the connecting road and railroad tracks leading to Centralia. Listed as 1.5 acres (0.61 ha) in size, the east portion of the park had an 8 foot (2.4 metres) fence. Funding to purchase the land and make improvements was collected by band performances, including the presentations of minstrel shows. Subsequent funding was provided with concerts and dances at the park. The park had plans to include a covered pavilion with a band stage and dance floor. In late 1905, a portion of the park was purchased for use as a foundry and machine shop and the pavilion was enclosed and utilized as part of the iron works plant.

The remaining park grounds began to be referred to as Twin City Park by 1910, due to its location on the border of Chehalis and Centralia. By 1911, a hall had been built but used sparingly, and a grandstand had been constructed. The park was sold in November 1911 to the Liederkranz society, a local German social organization, and the property converted into a mixed-use theater and dance hall. After the construction of the Liederkranz Hall, the grounds were occasionally alluded to as a park or treated as such, and in some cases the site was given the name Recreation Park. The last newspaper report to allude to Twin City Park was in 1916.

During spring 1918, coinciding with the involvement of the United States in World War I, the German Liederkranz Hall was demanded to be renamed by a local Chehalis citizen's club; the hall became known as the Chehalis Auditorium. Months later, the venue suffered severe damages due to arson. The auditorium was renamed the Liberty Hall shortly thereafter but fell into decay and the park grounds went unused. The building that was once the Liederkranz Hall was condemned and destroyed completely after a fire in February 1926.

=== Chehalis Municipal Rose Garden ===
Chehalis Municipal Rose Garden
- Interactive map of Chehalis Municipal Rose Garden
- Coordinates: 46°39′54″N 122°58′05″W
- Created: 1934
- Closed: 2007
- Species: Roses

The Chehalis Municipal Rose Garden was an accredited test garden for the commercial viability of certain rose species. It was located between the Chehalis city hall and library, near the present day site of the Vernetta Smith Chehalis Timberland Library. The grounds were created in 1934. Annual gardening events and competitions for roses have been held in the city since then although the garden was not officially considered created until the late 1940s. By 1960, the nursery was one of only 51 test gardens for roses in the United States.

The rose garden was an important part of the city's nickname, "The Rose City", which was chosen in 2000. The grounds contained 75 varieties of roses, some of which were national prize winners of the All-America Rose Selections (AARS). A total of 300 rose bushes were listed as being planted in the space by the turn of the 21st century. The garden was removed during the demolition of the previous library in 2007. The rose bushes were transplanted to Henderson Park but did not thrive. A year before the removal, the Chehalis Municipal Rose Garden was one of six accredited AARS gardens in the state and one of 138 in the nation.

=== Duffy Park ===
Duffy Park
- Duffy Addition, Scenery Park
- Interactive map of Duffy Park
- Coordinates: 46°39′24″N 122°56′43″W
- Area: 4.56 acres (1.85 ha)
- Designated: 1902, never officially opened
- Etymology: Named after Horatio J. Duffy
- Status: Closed
- Terrain: Hill
- Vegetation: Logged site

Located between Crestview Drive and Prospect Street on Prospect Hill, there are conflicting reports of when the park was given to the city, spanning almost two decades. The first record of such a donation is listed in December 1887, but an official plat and deed is mentioned as taking place in May 1888. The grounds, measuring 4.56 acres (1.85 ha), were then reportedly bestowed in 1902 to Chehalis by Horatio J. (H.J.) Duffy for $1. Once named "Scenery Park", the area was never officially listed as a park by the city, despite plans in 1914 to build a bandstand at the entrance of the grounds, and only referred to as an "unimproved park".

Duffy Park is located on the hillside, south-southeast of McFadden Park, and there are no signs or trail markers. Logged in 1993, the proceeds of the timber helped fund projects for other parks in Chehalis, notably Penny Playground. A local Boy Scouts troop replanted the area with hopes to use it as a learning forest but the effort did not materialize. The city attempted to consider the area surplus in 2005 and 2007, with an attempt in between during 2006 to pursue the construction of a reservoir on the property; the endeavors were unsuccessful. The city continues to provide general maintenance to the park.

=== East Side Park ===
An east side park was first discussed in 1905, with funds and plans to be decided at a later date after initial landscaping was begun. Officially started in 1906 with a $500 fund, the park occupied a triangular area uphill of the St. Helens Hotel in the downtown district. In late 1907, the city park board announced plans to seed the grounds for a lawn and to plant trees around the perimeter, but funding had not yet been collected. Issues with the grade and road improvements would plague the completion of the project. Never completed, the land was offered in mid-1908 as the location of the Chehalis Carnegie library, which was completed and opened in 1910.

=== Rice Auto Park ===
The automobile waystation was opened in May 1924 and was located on the Pacific Highway (known eventually as Jackson Highway), immediately south of the existing city border at the time. The park was named after its owners, the Rice family. The husband, J.D. Rice, was a proprietor of several theater houses in Chehalis, including The Dream, in the early 20th century. Originally the rest area contained cottages, a community kitchen, and facilities for bathing and laundry. Within two months, the Theodore Roosevelt Highway Association commended the Rice family for the accommodations provided at the auto park. Concord grapes were grown at the grounds beginning at its inception and in 1930 an arson-caused fire destroyed a cottage. Later that year the Rice family, feeling ready for retirement, sold the park which had begun to be more of a business than recreation area. A lease in 1931 led to the several updates to the park, including a large dining room. J.D. Rice remarried and took up the business again by 1932 and began to live in his prior residence on the property. A public divorce in 1937 showed evidence of a transfer of ownership of the Rice Auto Park, and its business amenities, to his wife when they were first married. The park no longer exists.

== Proposed parks ==
A pedestrian trail system was proposed in 2005 that was to connect east Chehalis with the city's community west of I-5. Known as the Chehalis Community Pathway, the system would have linked existing parks to the Chehalis Downtown Historic District, museums and tourist attractions, and the Chehalis Industrial Park. Long-term plans included joining the pathway project with the Willapa Hills Trail.

An art park was proposed in 2012 on land that was formerly the site of an electrical substation. Given early names such as "Power Free Park" and "Chehalis Art Park", the recreation site would be located between the Washington State Route 6 exchange and the government district. The park would consist of artworks, a pet area, and would potentially host EV charging stations. As of 2023, the Lewis County PUD and the Chehalis Community Renaissance Team led project had not been formally adopted.

A railfan park has been considered that would neighbor the Lewis County Historical Society and Museum, once a railway depot. The idea began after a video camera was placed on the museum in 2019 that livestreams the railroad activity in the area. The park would include benches and tables, a boardwalk, courtyard, and a caboose open for exploration.

In early 2024, a proposal was offered to the city council to create an ecotourism park in a wetland area owned by the city that surrounds the watershed of Coal Creek. Potentially encompassing 88 acres (36 ha), it would require Chehalis to purchase up to an additional 20 acres (8.1 ha) in the basin and would include cooperation of several entities, including the Office of Chehalis Basin (OCB), for aquatic habitat restoration. The OCB funded the initial study phase beginning in March 2025 for $280,000 and a sponsor, American Rivers, was found to support the project. Estimated costs for the park were listed as high as $1.3 million.

== Other recreation ==
The Riverside Golf Course is nestled between the Chehalis–Centralia Airport and the Chehalis River. Spanning 110 acres (45 ha), it plays 6,155 yards for a par of 71. The course has a 69.0 rating with a slope rating of 125. Originally a nine-hole course when first constructed in 1927, it expanded to 18 holes in 1971. It has hosted various charity fundraisers, competitions, and playoffs for local high school golf teams, and the Lewis County Amateur Championship.

A Thousand Trails campground is situated on Centralia-Alpha Road in Chehalis, east of the community of Forest. The site was founded in 1969 and opened in 1972, becoming the first Thousand Trails resort ever built.

== See also ==
- List of parks and recreation in Lewis County, Washington
- List of Washington state parks
- Parks and recreation in Centralia, Washington
