= Cowlitz, Chehalis and Cascade Railway 15 =

Preserved American 2-8-2 locomotive

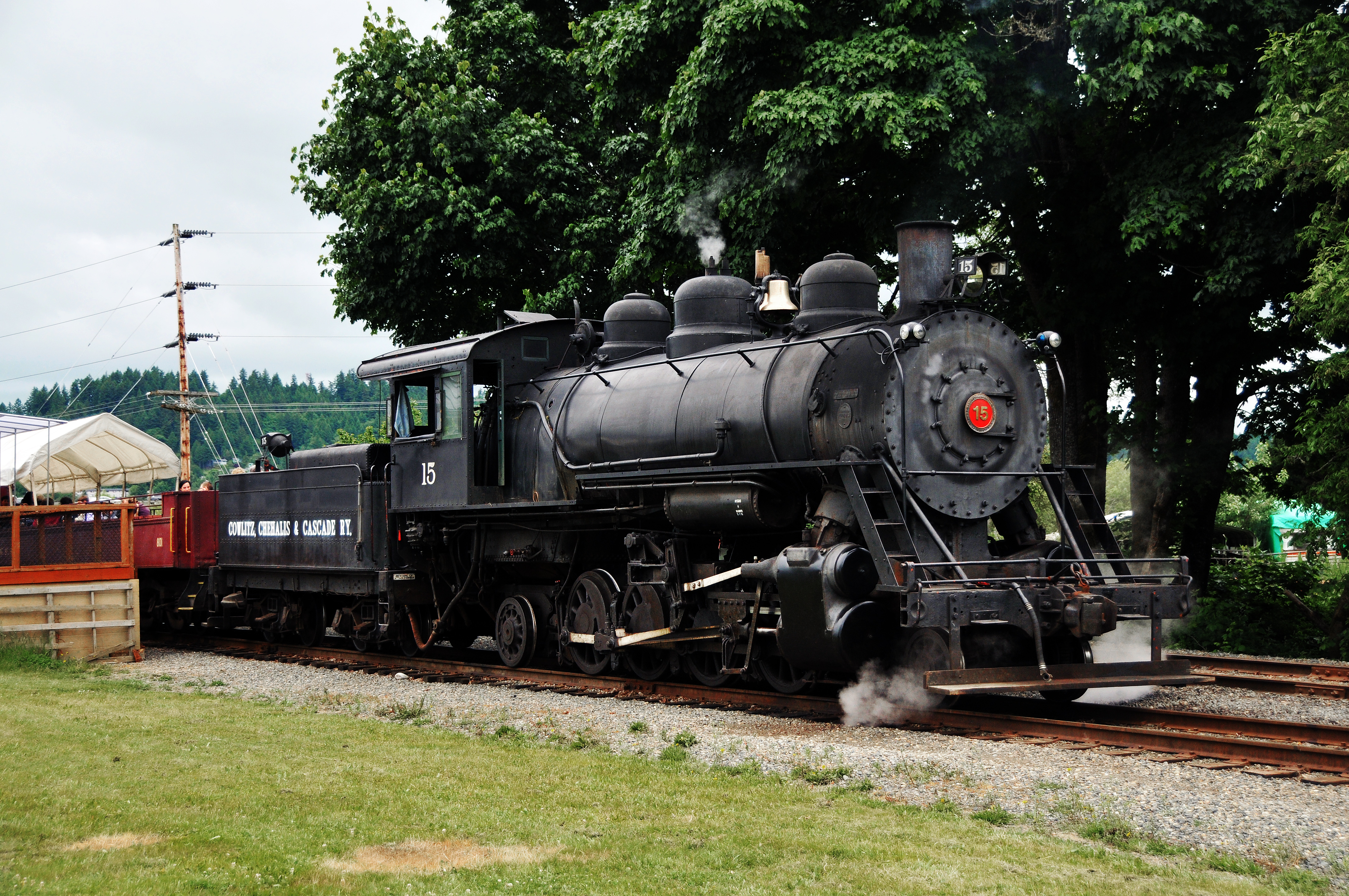
- No. 15 at the station with an excursion train, June 19, 2011
Type and origin
- Power type: Steam
- Builder: Baldwin Locomotive Works
- Serial number: 44106
- Build date: September 1916
Specifications
- Configuration
  - Whyte: 2-8-2
- Gauge: 4 ft 8 1/2 in (1,435 mm)
- Driver dia.: 63 in (1.600 m)
- Wheelbase: 55.37 ft (16.88 m)
- Adhesive weight: 141,500 lb (64,200 kg)
- Loco weight: 174,650 lb (79.2 t)
- Fuel type: Oil
- Fuel capacity: 1,500 US gal (5,700 L; 1,200 imp gal)
- Water cap.: 2,500 US gal (9,500 L; 2,100 imp gal)
- Boiler pressure: 180 psi (1.24 MPa)
- Cylinders: Two, outside
- Cylinder size: 26.5 in × 30 in (673 mm × 762 mm)
- Valve gear: Walschaert
- Valve type: Piston valves
- Loco brake: Air
- Train brakes: Air
- Couplers: Knuckle
Performance figures
- Tractive effort: 35,000 lbf (155.7 kN)
- Factor of adh.: 4.24
Career
- Operators: Puget Sound and Cascade Railway; Clear Lake Lumber Company; Cowlitz, Chehalis and Cascade Railway; Chehalis–Centralia Railroad
- Class: 200
- Numbers: PSCR 200; CLLC 200; CC&C 15
- Nicknames: Old Lady
- Retired: 1955
- Restored: April 28, 1989
- Current owner: Chehalis–Centralia Railroad Association
- Disposition: Undergoing boiler repairs

Cowlitz, Chehalis and Cascade Railway 15 is a 200 class 2-8-2 "Mikado" type steam locomotive, built in 1916 by the Baldwin Locomotive Works (BLW) for the for the Puget Sound and Cascade Railway (PSCR) and later the Clear Lake Lumber Company (CLLC). It is preserved and operated by the Chehalis–Centralia Railroad (CHTX) in Chehalis, Washington.

== History ==
The locomotive was built in September 1916 by the Baldwin Locomotive Works (BLW) for the Puget Sound and Cascade Railway (PSCR) and later the Clear Lake Lumber Company (CLLC) as No. 200. The locomotive spent many years hauling logging trains on Clear Lake's mainline until the Clear Lake Lumber Company went bankrupt. In 1926, it was sold to the Cowlitz, Chehalis and Cascade Railway (CC&C) and was renumbered to No. 15, there, it continued hauling logging trains for the next twenty-nine years.

It was retired from revenue service in 1955 and was donated to the City of Chehalis who preserved it for static display at Recreation Park, where it remained on display for the next thirty-one years and because known locally as the "Old Lady".

In 1986, the Chehalis–Centralia Railroad Association was formed and approached the City of Chehalis and asked about purchasing and restoring the No. 15 to operating condition for tourist excursions. It was eventually removed from display and moved into the Mt. Rainier Scenic Railroad's (MRSR) Mineral Shops where restoration work officially began.

On April 28, 1989, restoration was completed and No. 15 moved under its own power for the first time in thirty-four years. On April 30, the engine was coupled between Mt. Rainier Scenic Railroad 5 and F9 No. 7012A and ran a 66-mile excursion to Chehalis Western's ex-Milwaukee Road Western Junction trackage.

On May 19, No. 15 hauled a mixed train over the portion of MRSR's leased trackage to Elbe, the following day, the engine ran a special excursion from Fredrick Junction to Chehalis in preparation to begin its tourist operating service with the Chehalis–Centralia Railroad (CHTX).

It officially began hauling excursion trains in the summer of that year, operating over 10-miles of the ex-Milwaukee Road, a Weyerhaeuser Timber Company-owned trackage. In 2016, No. 15 celebrated its 100th birthday.

In 2019, No. 15 was found to have major boiler damage and could no longer be steamed safely, it was taken out of service to undergo major boiler repairs with an estimated cost of $1 million to return it to operation again. As of 2026, work is still underway.
