= Chehalis–Centralia Railroad =

Heritage railroad in Washington, United States

Chehalis-Centralia Railroad & Museum
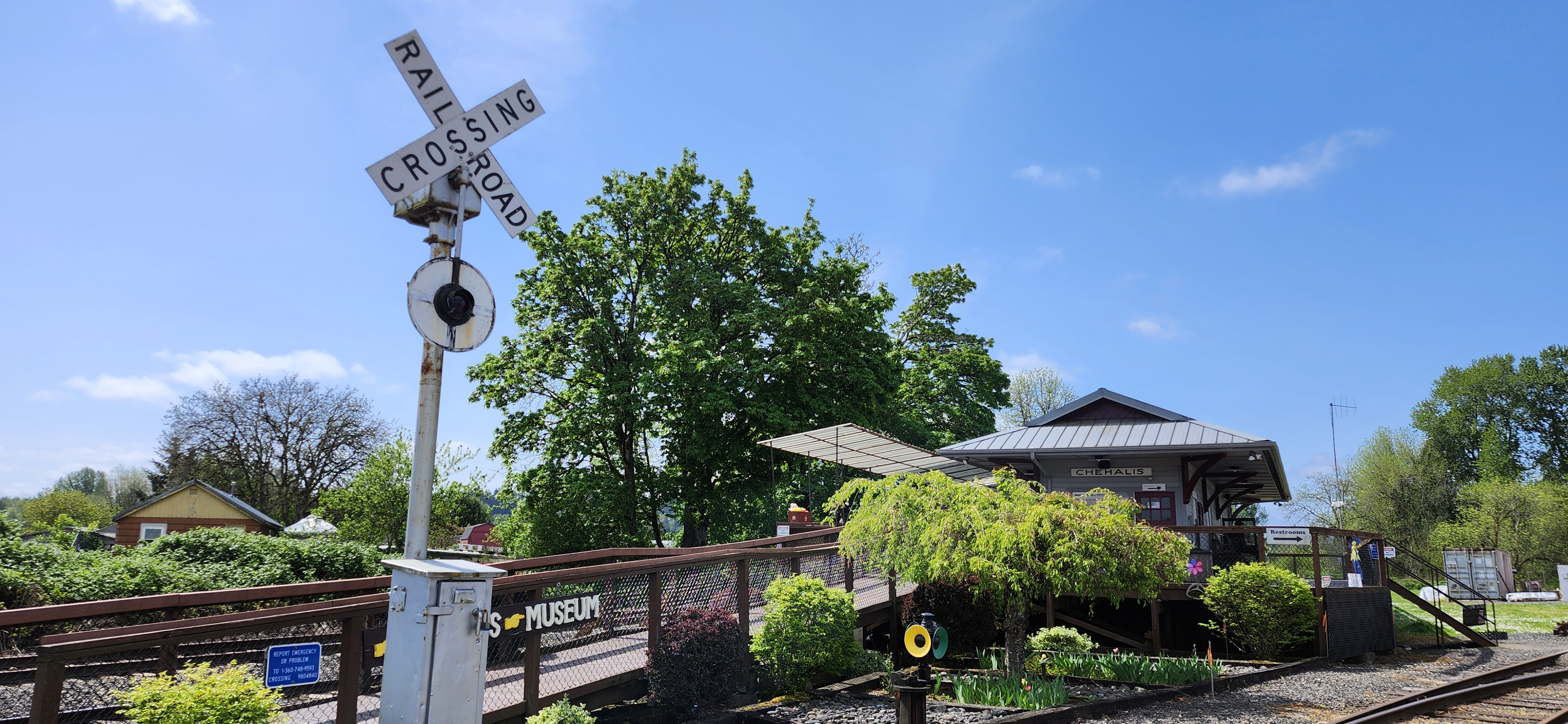
- Chehalis-Centralia Railroad depot, 2025
- Locale: Chehalis, Washington
- Terminus: Chehalis
- Coordinates: 46°39′09″N 122°58′37″W

Commercial operations
- Built by: Puget Sound & Willapa Harbor Railway

Preserved operations
- Operated by: Chehalis-Centralia Railroad Museum
- Reporting mark: CHTX
- Stations: 1
- Length: 10 miles (16 km)
- Preserved gauge: 4 ft 8 1/2 in (1,435 mm) standard gauge

Commercial history
- Opened: November 8, 1915
- Closed: December 31, 1918
- Preserved era: 1986 – present

Preservation history
- 1986: The Chehalis–Centralia Railroad Association is organized
- April 28, 1989: Restoration on No. 15 is completed
- June 1989: Tourist operations begin
- 1996: Rail tracks from Weyerhauser is purchased
- March 2022: Operations suspended
- 2023: Museum reopens
- April 2024: Tourist operations resume
- Headquarters: Chehalis, Washington

Website
- Official website

The Chehalis–Centralia Railroad (reporting mark CHTX), also known as the Chehalis-Centralia Railroad & Museum, is a heritage railroad based in Chehalis, Washington.

The Cowlitz, Chehalis and Cascade Railway 15, a 2-8-2 "Mikado" type steam locomotive built by Baldwin in 1916, travels over a 10-mile section of former Milwaukee Road track. The rail course winds through scenic hills, farmland, and over several wooden trestles above the Chehalis River, along with various tributary streams including the Newaukum River.

Operations, overseen by the Chehalis-Centralia Railroad Museum, were suspended indefinitely in 2022 due to insurance issues but were resumed a year later under agreement with Goose Lake Railway.

== History ==
The route was originally built by the Puget Sound & Willapa Harbor Railway and originally operated between November 8, 1915 to December 31, 1918.

The Chehalis-Centralia Railroad (CCR) was incorporated as a non-profit organization in 1986 by Chehalis citizens inspired by a visit to Chehalis, Washington by the Mt. Rainier Scenic Railroad. The organization runs a 1916 Baldwin steam engine, No. 15, known locally as the "Old Lady", from Recreation Park in Chehalis, where it had been on display for over 30 years, and brought it to the Mt. Rainier shops in Mineral, Washington, for restoration.

The 1916 Baldwin, a 2-8-2 configuration, was built in Philadelphia originally for logging operations by Clear Lake Lumber Company in Skagit County, Washington as No. 200. The company, or possibly the railway, defaulted on the payments and the engine was sold to the Cowlitz, Chehalis, & Cascade Railroad after it was repossessed and was renumbered to No. 15. The No. 15 was reported to have been relocated to the city of Chehalis in 1926 and was retired in 1955 where it was placed at the park.

Work on the locomotive was completed on April 28, 1989 and the railroad started operations later in the summer of that year over the ex-Milwaukee Road, a Weyerhaeuser Timber Company-owned track. Passenger cars were purchased during the period and the restoration cost approximately $100,000; the funds were generated from grants and private donations, and included volunteer labor hours.

The Port of Chehalis, in 1996, helped purchase the rail tracks from Weyerhauser for the CCR via a $420,000 grant from the Washington State Department of Transportation (WSDOT). Due to the December 2007 floods, the railroad sustained significant damage. The right-of-way was restored due in part to efforts of volunteers and the port authority; a $1.5 million grant from the Federal Emergency Management Agency (FEMA) funded the repair project. A centennial celebration was held for the 1916 Baldwin in 2016 at the CCRM site.

In early 2019, the No. 15 was found to have major boiler damage and could no longer be steamed safely and it was out of service for several years. Repairs were expected to be completed by mid-to-late 2021 but severe washouts to the rail lines in February 2022 hampered the efforts. Funding to restore the line was requested from FEMA and the SBA. The funding was granted, and a complete restoration and overhaul of the line was completed in mid-2023. During this period of time, major work was completed both on the line and in the yard that had been deferred for years. This included a complete re tamp and regulation of the rail line, over 1,000 ties replaced, and cosmetic restoration of the depot and engine No. 6. Repairs of Locomotive 15 was suspended due to lack of funding but resumed thanks to state legislation. After an evaluation of two steam locomotives at the Chehalis-Centralia Railroad Museum (CCRM) in 2024, restorations were estimated to cost $1.0 million per engine. The CCRM announced that their collection of 600-series rail cars were also undergoing renovations and new trips, including a ride to the Willapa Hills, were planned.

The CCRM owns a railway turntable, measuring 85 feet (26 m) in length and standing 12 feet (3.7 m) tall, but was never installed or implemented due to the site's lowland nature and flooding concerns. In a non-monetary trade with Northwest Railway Museum in Snoqualmie, the turntable is planned to be exchanged for a 1950s Pullman coach. The coach, built for the Atchison, Topeka and Santa Fe Railway and used by Amtrak into the late-1970s, was delivered to the CCRM location in August 2026.

== Operations ==
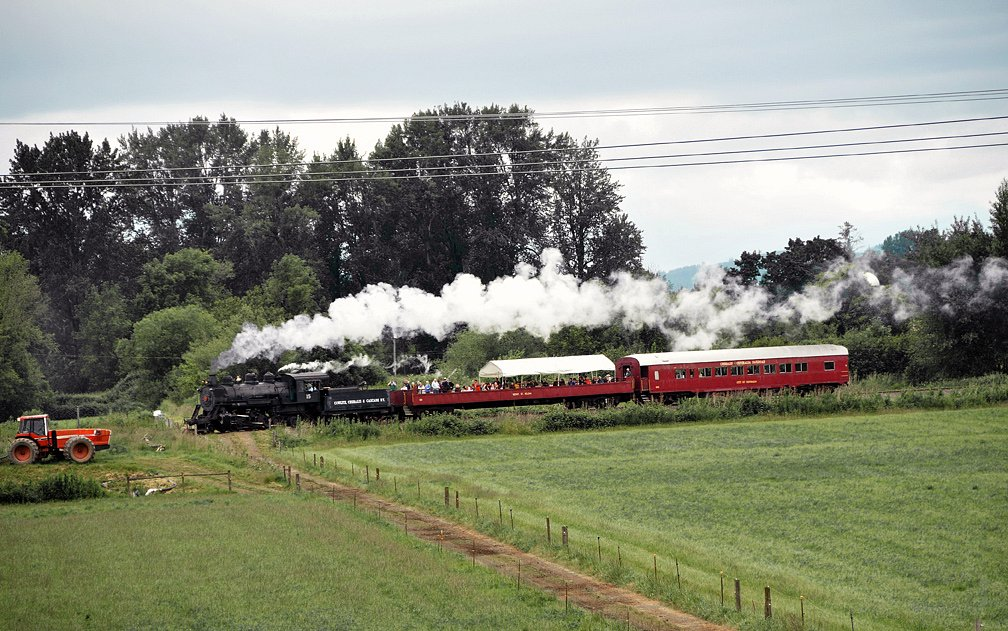
No. 15 hauling an excursion train, June 2011

Operations and excursions of the railroad are overseen by the Chehalis-Centralia Railroad Museum (CCRM), located at a depot situated south of the Veterans Memorial Museum in Chehalis, Washington near State Route 6 and Interstate 5.

In 2006, the railroad reported a record 10,250 riders. Despite damages to the tracks from the 2007 flood, which led to fewer rides and shorter trips, ridership remained around an average of 10,000 into the 2009 season.

In March 2022, the museum suspended their operations after it lost its liability insurance coverage, due to financial losses stemming from two collision accidents. The museum reopened in 2023 and made repairs to the tracks and the train engine. That same year, a partnership contract with the Mt. Rainier Scenic Railroad to begin joint operations on the CCRM rail lines did not materialize, but CCRM reached a joint operating agreement with Goose Lake Railway. Train rides began again in April 2024.

By July 2024, months after the restart of operations, the CCRM reported earnings above $112,000 and counted over 3,800 passengers. In 2025, the CCRM reported ticket sales for excursion and event rides to reach over 10,100; approximately 80% of passengers were noted to be non-Lewis County residents.

During an average train excursion, the No. 15 steam engine is reported to burn approximately 100 US gallons (380 L; 83 imp gal) of oil and use up to 1,000 US gallons (3,800 L; 830 imp gal) of water.

== Excursions and events ==
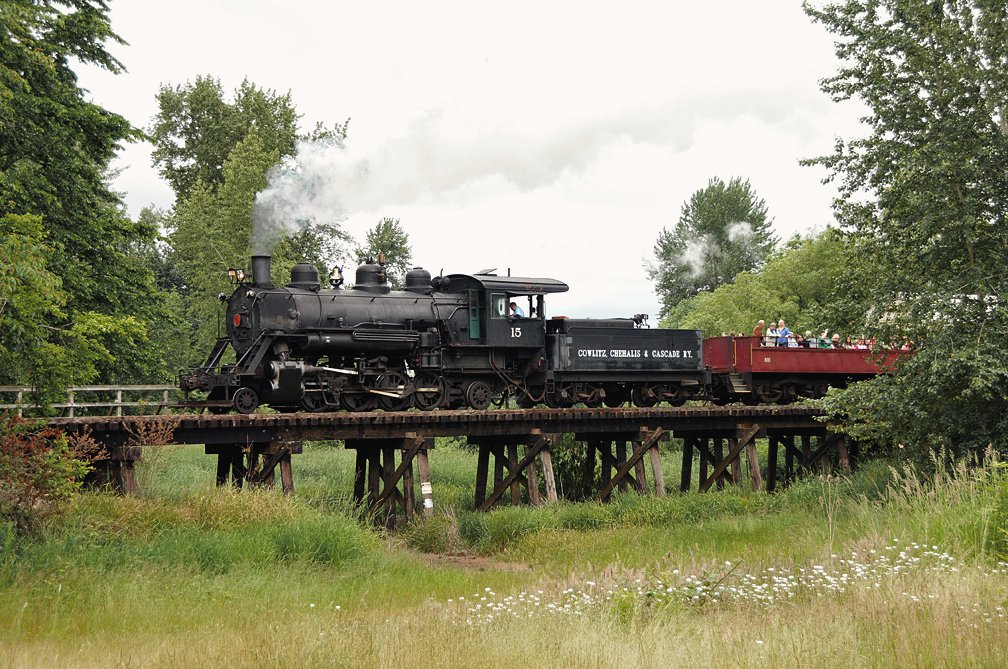
Engine No. 15 crossing wood trestle

The heritage railroad provides an 18-mile (29 km) round-trip that courses through the Chehalis River valley. Separate excursion rides are provided for exclusively for children in the local school district or are members of the regional Boys & Girls Clubs of America. As of 2024, other rides include a variety of themed trips such as a dinner murder mystery or escape room excursions, or holiday and film-themed outings.

The CCRM has hosted, since 2012, a quickly sold-out Christmas-themed Polar Express ride during the winter holiday season, providing refreshments and holiday activities in the course of the hour-long trip.

The CCRM partnered with a rail bike company in 2025 to provide recreational use of the tracks.

== Equipment ==
Locomotive details
Number	Image	Type	Model	Built	Builder	Status	Description
15		Steam	2-8-2	1916	Baldwin Locomotive Works	Undergoing repairs	The "Mikado", inoperative due to a failed boiler since 2019, has been undergoing repairs, estimated to cost $1 million as of 2025.
25		Steam	2-8-0	1917	Baldwin Locomotive Works	Stored, awaiting restoration	As of 2026, awaiting restoration. Once displayed in Centralia's Fort Borst Park.
6		Diesel	65-ton switcher	1940s	General Electric	Operational	As of 2025, main engine used for operations. Purchased from Puget Sound Naval Shipyard and rebuilt in 1965.

== See also ==
Media related to Chehalis-Centralia Railroad at Wikimedia Commons

- List of heritage railroads in the United States
