= Recreation Park Complex (Chehalis, Washington) =

Park complex in Chehalis, Washington

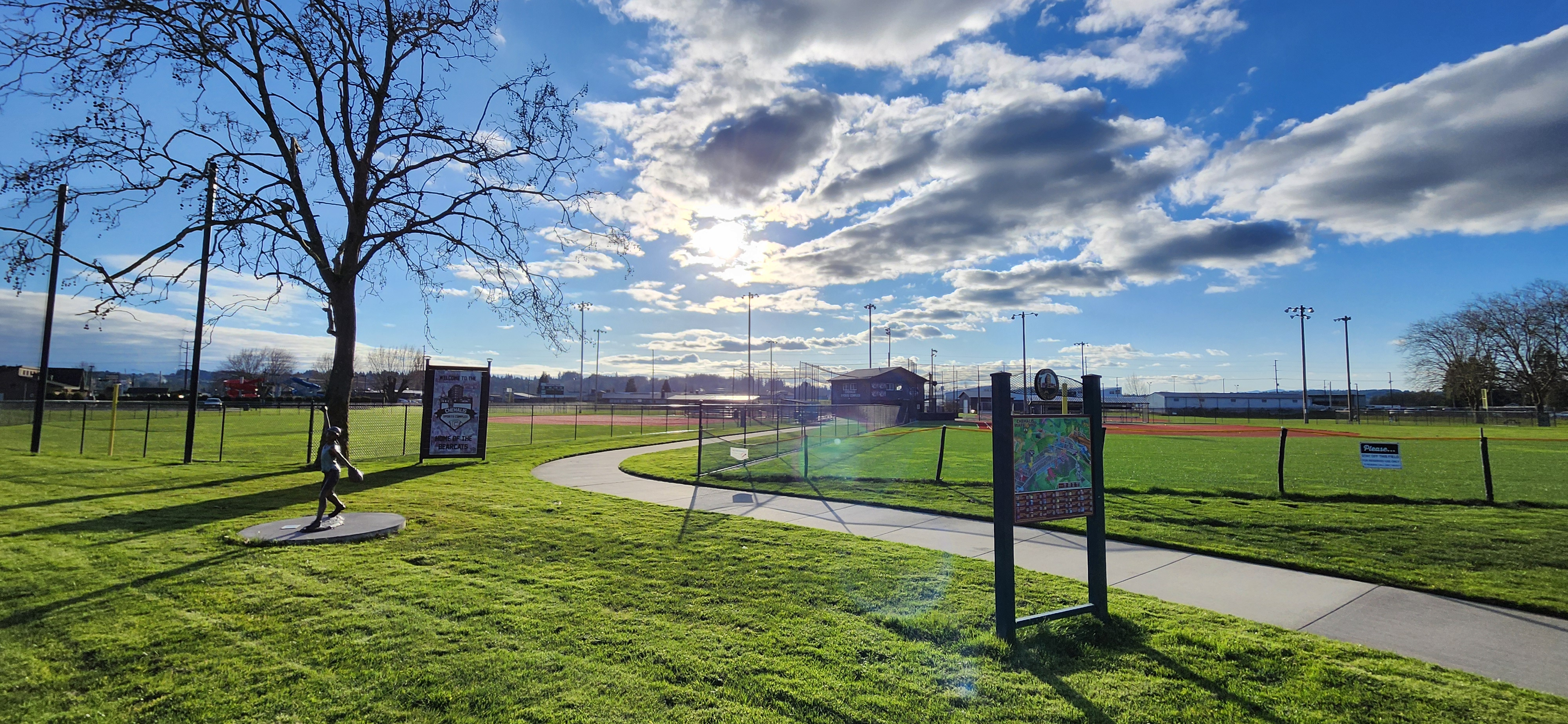
- Recreation Park, 2026
- Interactive map of Recreation Park Complex
- Address: Chehalis, Washington
- Coordinates: 46°39′04″N 122°57′24″W

The Recreation Park Complex is located in Chehalis, Washington in the city's South Market district near the Green Hill School. The venue, also known as the Chehalis Sports Complex, contains four distinct parks within its borders, providing recreation for athletics, walking, swimming, and playground activities.

== Park complex history ==
Approximately 13 acres (5.3 ha) of land for the Recreation Park Complex, also known as the Chehalis Sports Complex,, was donated by the state's Department of Highways to the city of Chehalis in 1945. (Note: Differing reports indicate that the parcel was 10 acres (4.0 ha) in size.)

A proposal by a local fitness club was introduced in 1996 that planned to construct a fitness center, listed at 19,000 square feet (1,800 m^{2}), and integrate the existing community pool into the overall layout. The city council pursued the idea, in part due to difficulties in funding of the swimming pool, and the proposal received some local support. However, due to a combination of deed restrictions and strong public vehemence, the fitness organization withdrew the idea from public consideration.

The complex was the end point of the Centralia to Chehalis Bike Ride, a bicycle event for local riders that was held continuously from the late 20th century into the 3rd millennium. The "C to C" route began at George Washington Park in Centralia, meandering around the Twin Cities, the Chehalis–Centralia Airport, and residential areas.

== Park areas ==
=== Recreation Park ===
Recreation Park
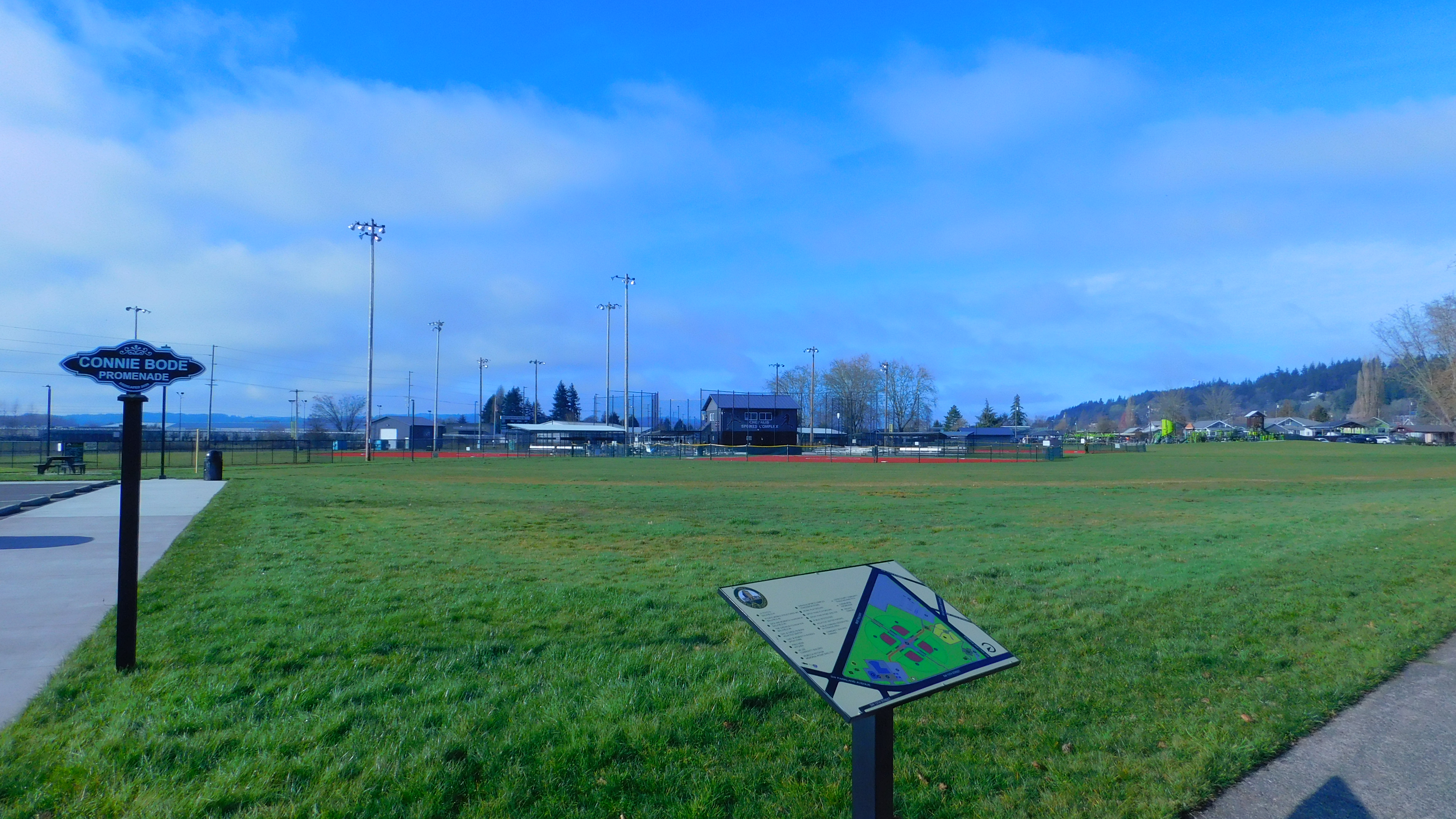
- Interactive map of Recreation Park
- Type: Athletics, walking, picnic
- Area: 13 acres (5.3 ha)
- Designated: 1945, park opened 1954
- Status: Open all year
- Paths: Concrete
- Terrain: Flat
- Parking: Street and lot, bicycle racks
- Public transit: Twin Transit
- Facilities: Bathrooms, concession stand, community building and kitchen

Located in Chehalis's South Market district, the park is the largest part of the Recreation Park Complex. Geared mostly for athletics, the area incorporates softball and youth baseball fields, picnic areas, and concrete walking paths. The Virgil R. Lee Community Building and the Fred Hess Kitchen are also located on the property and can be rented.

The first early efforts to convert the area to a park began in 1946 with the construction of a baseball field and renovations to the grounds continued into the 1950s, adding restrooms and more ballfields, specifically for Little League.

The grounds were officially transferred by deed to the city in 1953, with the park built and completed in 1954. The venue was awarded to host a district Little League tournament in 1955 and Little League baseball was played at the park until the 1970s. A small playground was situated on the grounds, with a rose garden eventually added in the 1960s.

As part of the 50th anniversary of the Rotary International, the Chehalis chapter built and donated the Virgil R. Lee Community Building in 1955. The 28 ft × 72 ft (8.5 m × 21.9 m) building, constructed at a cost of almost $10,000, included a kitchen, fireplace, and was to be used as a youth community center. The center, built in a log cabin style without the use of nails, was officially dedicated in October 1955.

The park grounds held a variety of different attractions during its early years. A steam locomotive, Chehalis–Centralia Railroad 15, once used by the Cowlitz, Chehalis and Cascade Railway was donated by the company and placed at the venue in 1955. The train engine, known locally as the "Old Lady", used to travel between the city and Winston. The locomotive was removed in the mid-1980s and became part of a heritage railway, the Chehalis–Centralia Railroad. Later that year, a brick war memorial was constructed at Recreation Park. Meant to honor service members of all branches of the United States military who perished during wartime, it included a 13 foot (4.0 metres) spiral monument with an inscribed plaque. In 1959, a tree stump meant to be a platform for a visit from President William McKinley was transferred to the park. Known in Chehalis as the McKinley Stump, (Note: President McKinley never used the stump due to a cancellation during his trip, however his successor, Theodore Roosevelt, stood atop it for a speech, and William Howard Taft used it as a podium the year before he was elected president. See sources.) it was removed in 2007 due to severe damage from carpenter ants. An inoperable 1925 American LaFrance firetruck was situated on the grounds for many years, removed due to deteriorating conditions and replaced with a picnic shelter.

An attempt in 2005 to rename the area as Rotary Recreation Park, due to the organization's long, recognized efforts, was not successful so as to not marginalize other volunteers and groups involved over the park's history. Beginning in 2015, feasibility studies were undertaken to plan ahead for a future renovation of the area. Attempts to relocate the ballfields from Recreation Park by building new fields at Stan Hedwall Park and subsequently transferring baseball and softball competitions there, did not proceed.

A renovation, consisting of several phases, began in August 2019. The cost of the plan was $4 million, with significant funding coming from the Chehalis Foundation, the National Park Service, and a Youth Athletic Facilities grant from Washington state. An $800,000 donation came from a trust created by a Chehalis family. Other funds were raised from a variety of grants, local volunteer drives, and state funds; the four ballfields were named after large donors. The project consisted of adding artificial turf to the ballfields, sod replacement, fixing drainage issues, a new irrigation system, installing all-weather walkways, and upgrading the concession stand and dugouts. The updates to the ballfields were declared as completed in 2022 with the grounds projected to generate $1 million in annual tax revenue for the city.

Due to the COVID-19 pandemic and requirements for social distancing, the reopening of the park was postponed several times between 2020 and 2021. The official grand reopening was held in August 2021. New funding from the Washington State Recreation and Conservation Office (RCO) in late 2023 provided the opportunity to upgrade the restrooms on the grounds, including the facilities at the spray park.

The park continues to be the home field of the W.F. West Bearcats softball team, an overall five-time state champion. A "Music in the Park" festival is held every summer at the park.

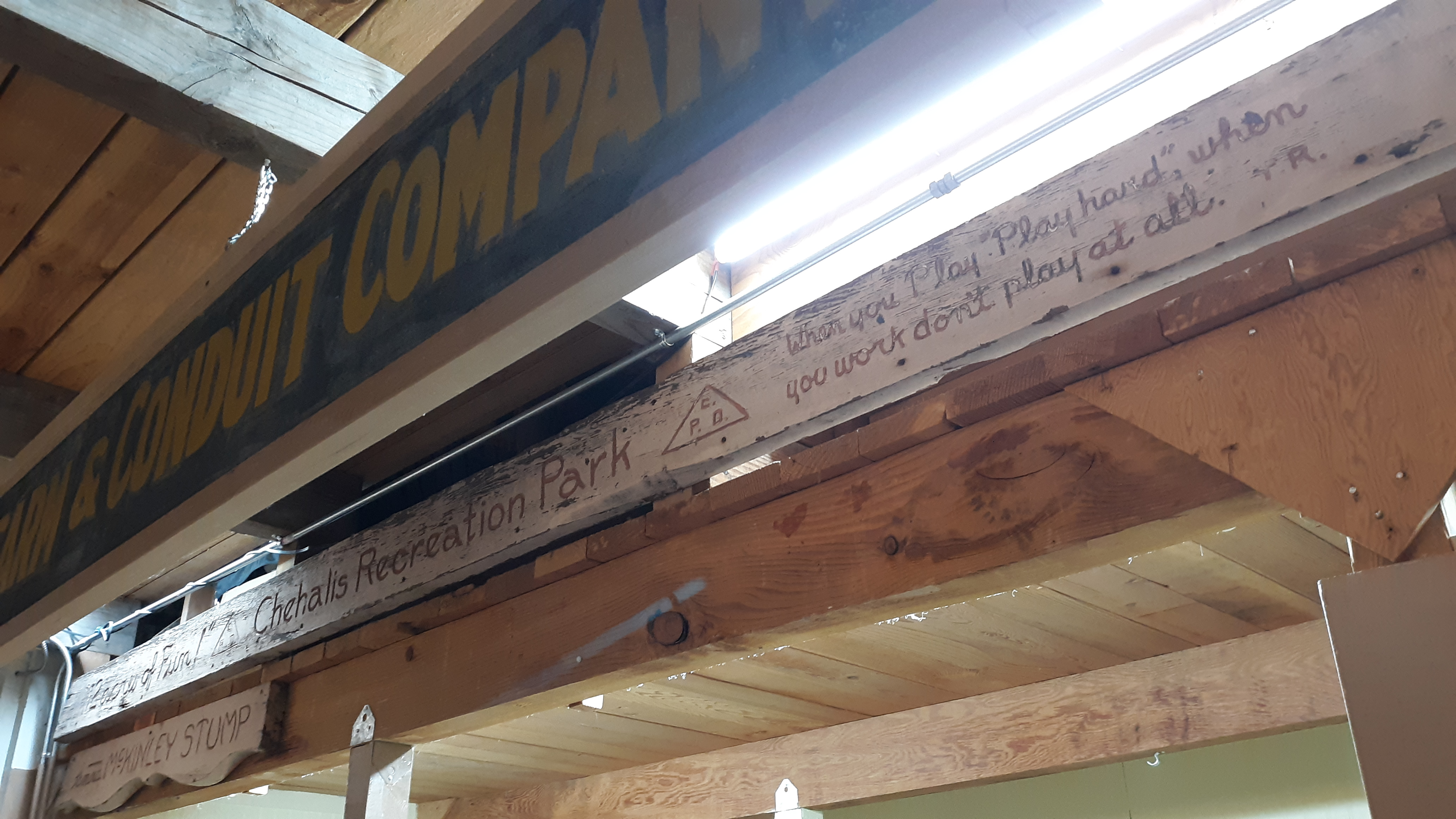
Original sign, Lewis County Historical Society and Museum

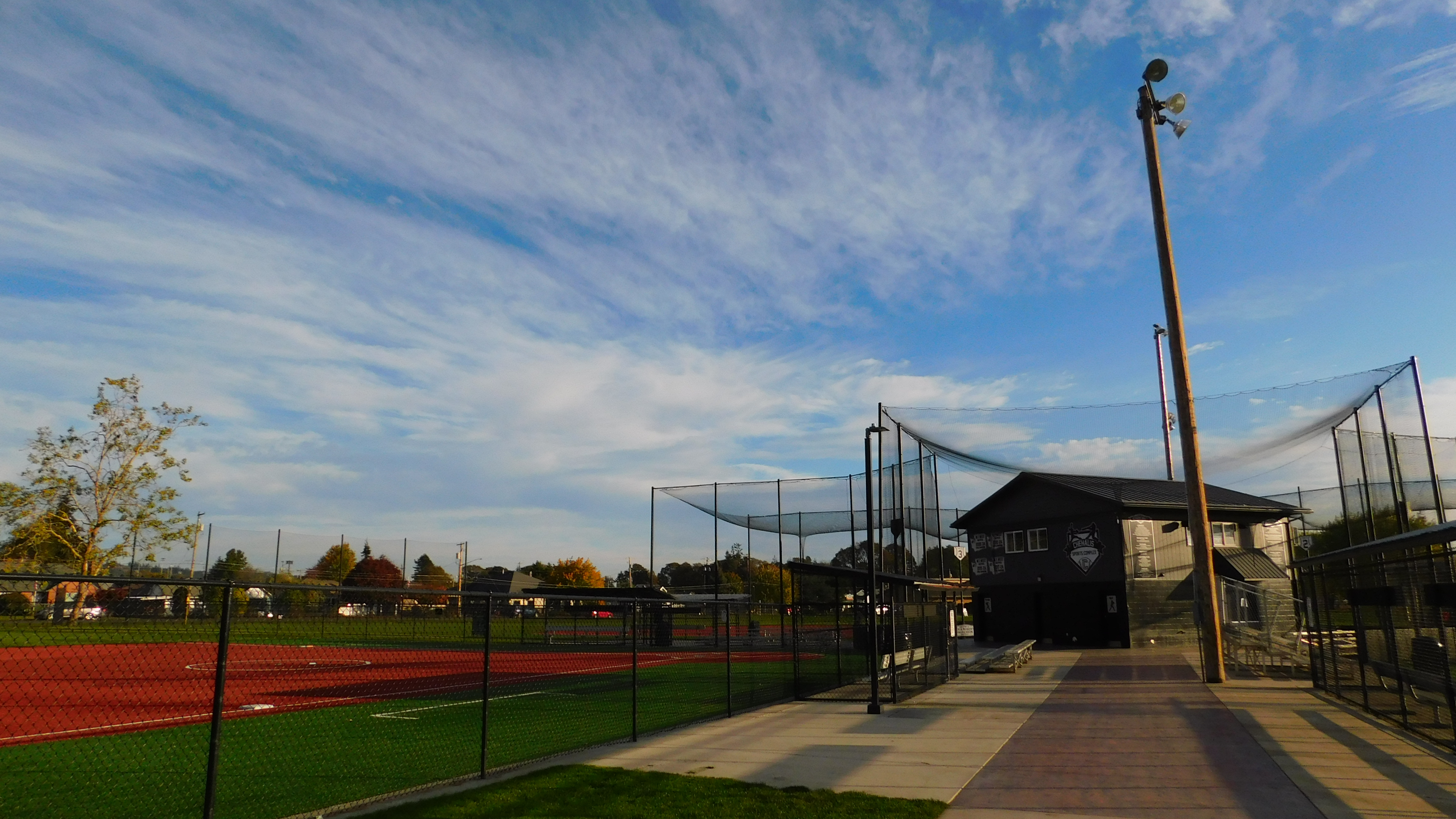
Softball fields, 2024

=== Penny Playground ===
Penny Playground
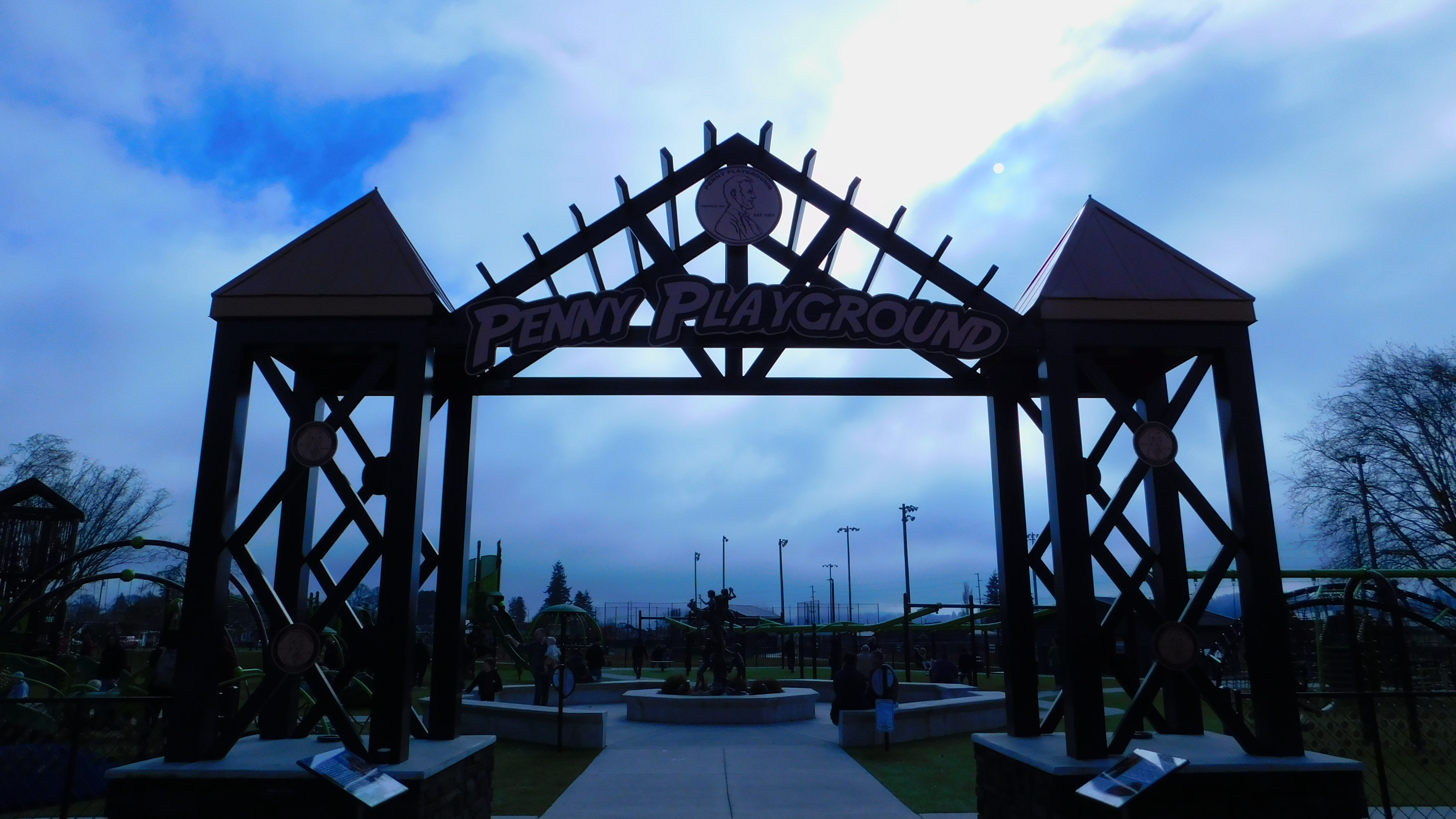
- Interactive map of Penny Playground
- Type: Children's playground
- Area: less than 1 acre (0.40 ha)
- Opened: 1993
- Founder: Dr. John Hendrickson
- Designer: Robert S. Leathers & Associates Architects, Ithaca, NY
- Etymology: Named after "penny" fundraising effort
- Manager: Connie Smalls (original build)
- Status: Open
- Paths: Perimeter sidewalk
- Terrain: Artificial grass, flat with some slight inclines
- Parking: Street and lot; bicycle racks
- Facilities: Bathrooms in surrounding park area

The effort to build Penny Playground began in 1992 through community initiative and fundraising, with a non-profit corporation created to oversee the project that year. From inception until completion, donations of $120,000 were collected from diverse businesses and charities, with a majority of funds gathered from Chehalis residents, including $1,200 by students from the Chehalis Middle School. The sale of $30,000 worth of timber from Duffy Park was designated for the project. In 1993, with a volunteer workgroup numbering 2,000 people, the playground was constructed in 5 days at a cost of $80,000. A time capsule was buried in 1994 and reopened in 2019. The name of the park was chosen from submissions by local schoolchildren: the "penny" moniker representing the fundraising drive to collect pennies to help pay for the construction.

A restoration of the park was necessary by 2019 as the original timber equipment, having surpassed its 20-year lifespan, had begun to deteriorate from dry rot, with additional concerns over the toxic chemicals in the treated wood, a lack of spare parts, and not meeting current safety requirements. The process began with a groundbreaking ceremony in October 2019. Funds totaling $1.3 million for the project were raised by assorted government departments within Washington state and Lewis County, local service groups such as the Kiwanis and Rotary International, and local businesses and residents. Students from several elementary schools in Chehalis raised $12,000; Lintott Elementary School was responsible for over $8,000. Residents donated money to the project via the Chehalis Foundation by purchasing commemorative pennies that were hung on a donation fence encompassing the playground. The new ADA compliant playground was furnished with all-weather equipment, a perimeter path, cushioning artificial turf, and sculptures, with a new parking lot and improved sidewalks around the area.

The reopening of the playground was postponed several times in 2020-2021 due to the COVID-19 pandemic and further delayed by $150,000 in damages from a hit-and-run vehicular accident. The park reopened in May 2021 after repairs from the crash were completed and additional improvements were made to protect the area from any similar future incident. A final addition to the playground was in 2022 with a "communication wall" meant for non-verbal, autistic, or verbally impaired children.

=== Gail and Carolyn Shaw Aquatics Center ===
Gail and Carolyn Shaw Aquatics Center
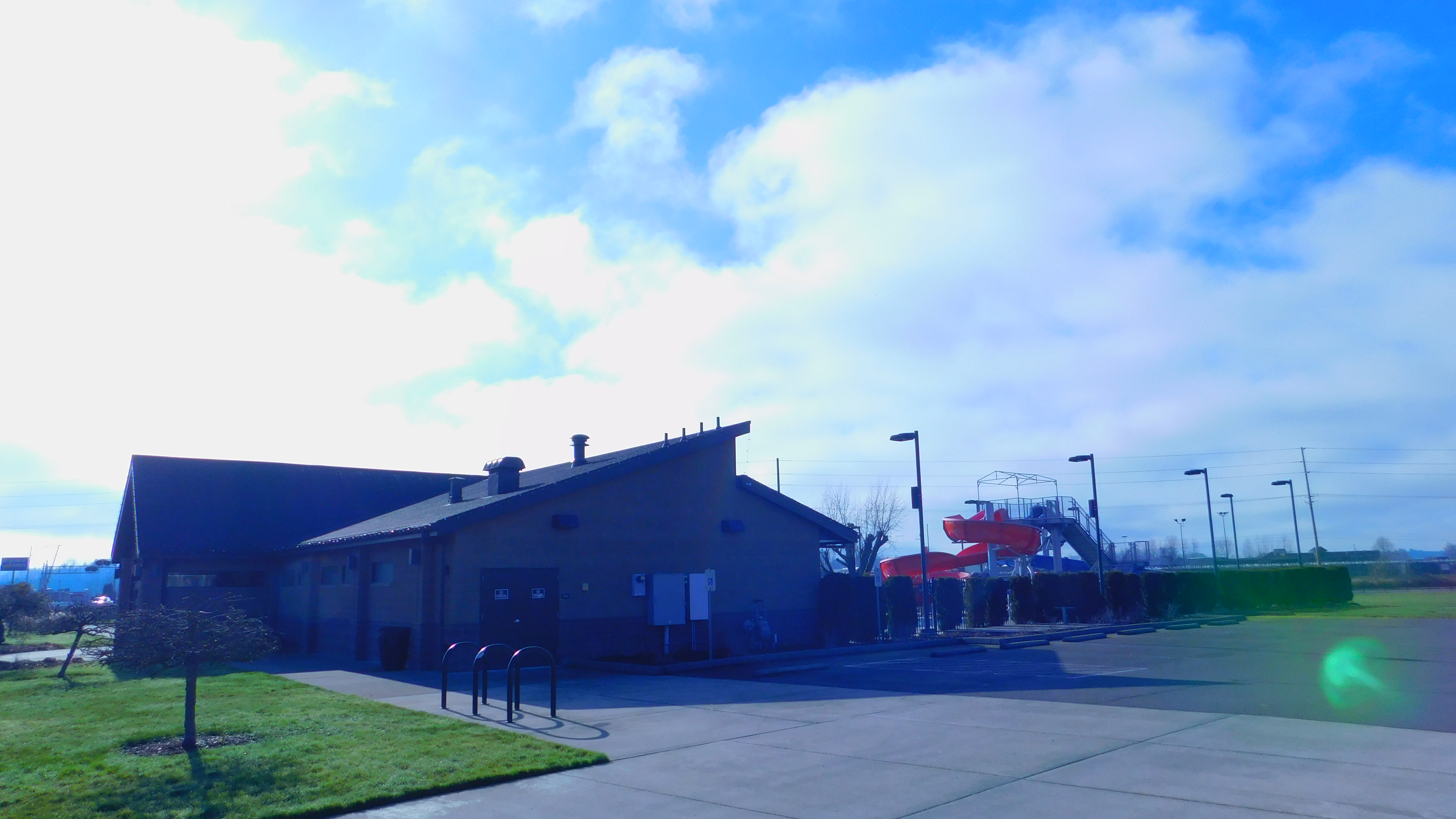
- Interactive map of Gail and Carolyn Shaw Aquatics Center
- Opened: August 2014
- Previous names: Chehalis Community Pool
- Operating season: Late spring to autumn
- Status: Operating
- Pools: A single pool
- Water slides: 2 water slides

The center was constructed to replace the original Chehalis Community Pool after a renovation project begun in 2012 morphed into a necessary replacement of the facility due to requirements for safety, appeal, and compliance with the American With Disabilities Act. The breadth of the proposal increased further due in large part to considerable donations from the local community, and an influx of a combined grant and budget item of $750,000 from the state government. Additional financial support soon followed by prominent Chehalis people and businesses, notably Orin C. Smith and the center's moniker, Gail and Carolyn Shaw. The initial cost was finalized at $2.7 million. The aquatic center opened in August 2014 with an official ribbon cutting the following month.

Maintenance and upgrades took place in 2019 and 2021 to make repairs, resurface the pool, and to increase the square footage and shading of the pool deck.

=== Chet and Henrietta Rhodes Spray Park ===
Chet and Henrietta Rhodes Spray Park
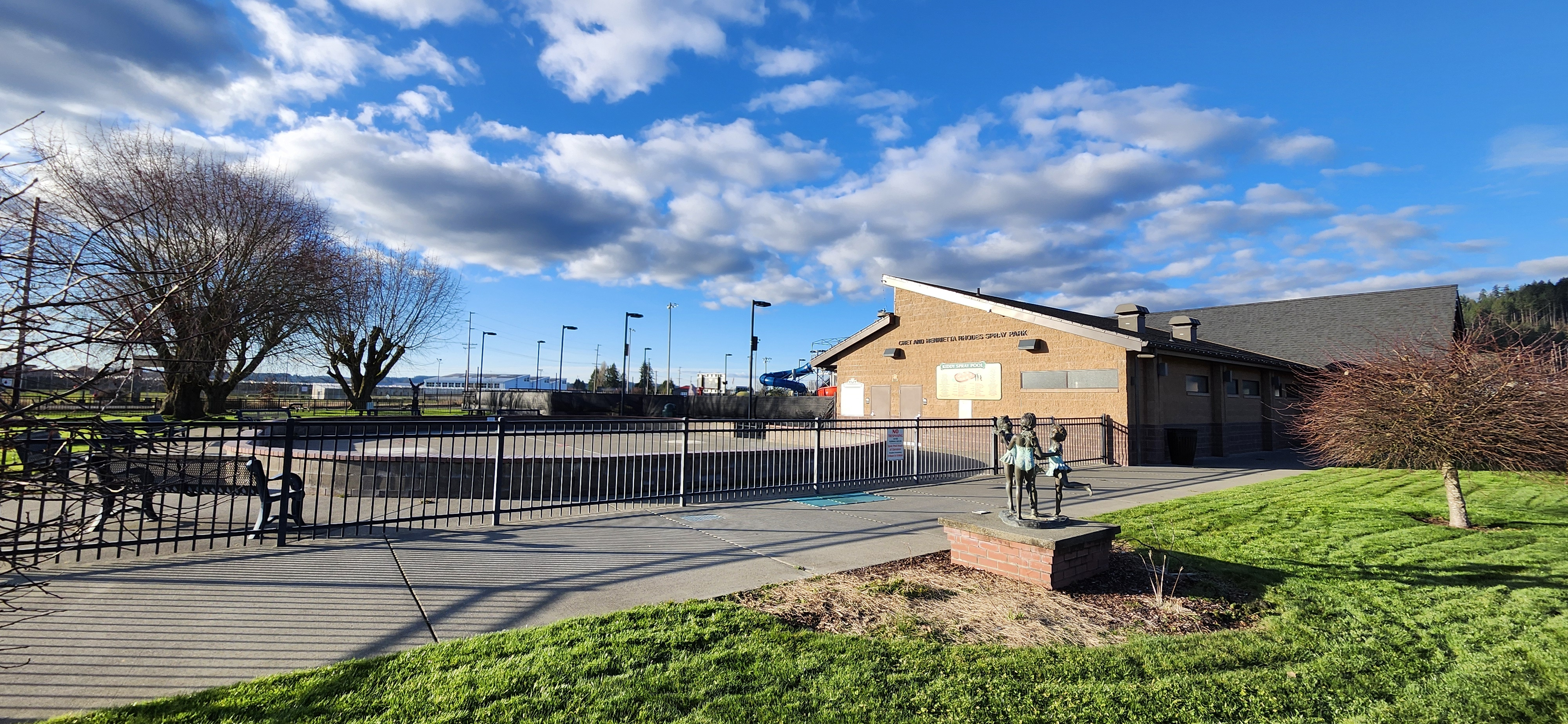
- Chet and Henrietta Rhodes Spray Park, 2026
- Interactive map of Chet and Henrietta Rhodes Spray Park
- Theme: Young children’s outdoor water play
- Opened: 2007
- Previous names: Kiddy Spray Pool
- Operating season: Late spring to autumn
- Status: Operating

The Chet and Henrietta Rhodes Spray Park is adjacent to the Gail and Carolyn Shaw Aquatics Center. It is open to the public and free of charge. Completed in 2007, local fundraisers produced $120,000 for the project that was built as a "fun and safe space for young children’s outdoor water play". The former wading pool was removed and sponsorship bricks were added to the wall surrounding the play area. Initially given the title "Kiddy Spray Pool", the area was named after the parents of a local donor.

== Public art ==
The grounds of the complex host 4 bronze statues of young children in various forms of play. A statue of three girls dancing is located outside of the spray area, and the aquatic center hosts a likeness of a young girl sitting on a counter inside the center. Penny Playground features two young boys climbing a tree in the center of the play area. A statute of a young girl playing softball, posed in mid-pitch, stands near the ballfields in Recreation Park. It was installed in May 2024 and was dedicated to the girl's fastpitch team at the high school. The children represented in the artworks are based on the grandchildren of a local family who donated the statues.

== Chehalis Community Pool ==
Despite the Ol' Swimmin' Hole and sandy beach that existed at Lintott-Alexander Park, several attempts had been made by the city of Chehalis to build a community pool in the early part of the 20th century. One such plan included implementing and converting parts of the infrastructure of a reservoir and a ravine at John Dobson Park.

Due to costs and unrealized planning, a swimming pool was never constructed until the 1950s. The beginnings of the Chehalis Community Pool started from a 1955 city-wide survey of residents that asked of the most pressing needs for the community. A pool came in third on the report, however, a $175,000 bond to build a retractable roof pool facility was rejected the next year. A different proposal was brought to the ballot in 1957 and was approved. Construction began that year but, despite rallies and support from the Chehalis High School student body, finalizing the build ended inauspiciously in December, with a lack of funding and community participation in completing the $125,000 project. After a transfer of funds from the city's parking meter fund and a last minute delay due to vandalism, the pool opened to the public during an evening ceremony, which included a synchronized swimming performance, in June 1958.

The Chehalis Community Pool, measuring 75 ft × 82.5 ft (22.9 m × 25.1 m), was designed in an L-shape, providing two distinct zones for swimming and diving. It was specifically built of steel due to concerns of earthquakes based on the 1949 Olympia earthquake. The facilities were enclosed in a brick fence and included a bathhouse. The venue was also constructed so that it could be converted into an indoor swimming facility at a later time.

The pool became a focal point of the community and by the end of the 1965 season, 36,000 swimmers were recorded using the recreation center. In the 1970s, the city's park board held an annual swim meet which included a contest for the funniest dive, another event known as "Jive and Dive" where the pool was open at night for music, dancing, and evening swims, and a bicycle rally that originated from the venue. By 1977, the city began a renewed interest in covering the pool after a resident survey indicated a desire for such. Never built, the enclosure idea was brought up again in 1996 due to continuing public demand. The venue remained an outdoor pool facility during its existence.

Attendance at the pool began to wane in the 2000s, with numbers for an entire season registered at 5,000. Funding cuts were implemented, hours to access the pool were reduced, and positions eliminated in order to keep the pool open and fiscally viable. A planned renovation, estimated to cost $2.2 million, was begun in the 2010s, but due to age and lack of ADA amenities, the pool and facilities were demolished and replaced by the Gail and Carolyn Shaw Aquatics Center beginning in 2012.

== See also ==
- Parks and recreation in Chehalis, Washington
