= McKinley Stump =

Landmark in Chehalis, Washington

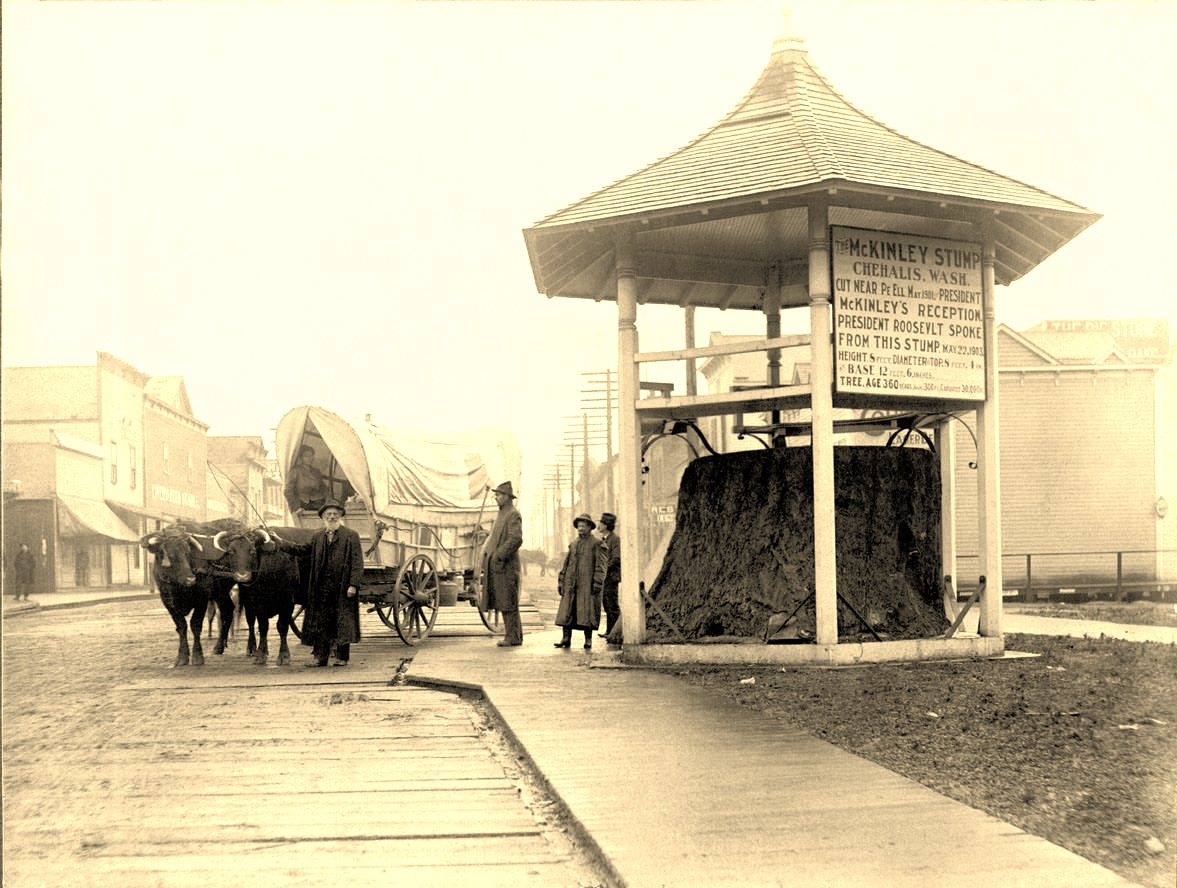
- McKinley Stump, with Ezra Meeker, 1906
- Interactive map of McKinley Stump
- 46°39′57.4″N 122°58′18.8″W
- Etymology: Named after President William McKinley
- Location: Lewis County Historical Society and Museum, Chehalis, Washington

History
- Built: 1901
- Built for: President William McKinley
- Original use: Podium
- Demolished: 2007
- Rebuilt: 2008

Site notes
- Height: Original, 8 ft (2.4 m); replica 6 ft (1.8 m)
- Area: less than one acre
- Architect(s): W. C. Yeoman, (stump); Anton Hess (pagoda)
- Architectural style: Pagoda
- Restored: Multiple efforts
- Current use: Tourist site and landmark
- Owner: City of Chehalis

The McKinley Stump was a remnant of a Douglas fir tree that was located in Chehalis, Washington. The tree trunk was originally for use as a speech podium for its namesake, President William McKinley. His stump speech, to be held in May 1901, was cancelled due to his wife's illness. The city kept the fir remnant, installing the landmark in time for a July 4th celebration that same year.

President Theodore Roosevelt became the first dignitary to speak from the stump in May 1903 during a 23-minute speech that heralded expansionism and hard work. William H. Taft, serving as Secretary of War, spoke from the stump in September 1907. Other politicians that have spoken from the McKinley Stump include Eugene V. Debs and Franklin D. Roosevelt.

The platform was cut in Pe Ell in 1901. The McKinley Stump was over 8 feet (2.4 m) in diameter at the top and approximately 8 feet (2.4 m) tall. The remnant was estimated to be between 360 and 700 years old, and the tree may have been up to 300 feet (91.4 m) in height. A bandstand-pagoda structure was constructed over the stump by 1903.

The podium had been relocated within Chehalis several times. First positioned near the city's original Northern Pacific train station, the landmark was slightly moved in 1914, immediately south of the 1912-constructed Burlington Northern Depot, listed on the National Register of Historic Places. Remaining until 1959, the stump was transported to the city's Recreation Park in order to make more room for parking in the downtown core. The stump remained at the park into 2007.

Vandalization of the stump and pagoda was noted almost immediately since the early 1900s; the damages became a continuing issue for the city. Despite upkeep and basic maintenance, rot and deterioration was noted by the 1950s and two arson attacks in 1961 and 1962 further damaged the historic platform. The city planned no centennial celebration of Teddy Roosevelt's 1903 visit and by 2007, the stump was reported to be in a severe state of decay. The original McKinley Stump was cut up and removed from the park, despite hopes that it could be saved, in October 2007. A top slab of the podium was saved as was the pagoda.

A replica stump, 6 feet (1.8 m) tall and 8 feet (2.4 m) in diameter, was cut in Tenino and in January 2008, installed at the Lewis County Historical Museum. The replacement podium is estimated to be between 500 and 700 years of age. The original pavilion was restored and placed over the reproduction later that year and the replica continues to use the McKinley Stump moniker.

== History ==
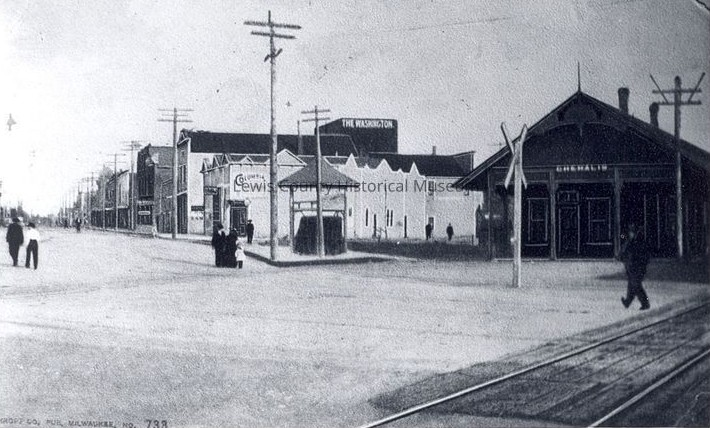
Stump near Northern Pacific station, c. 1904

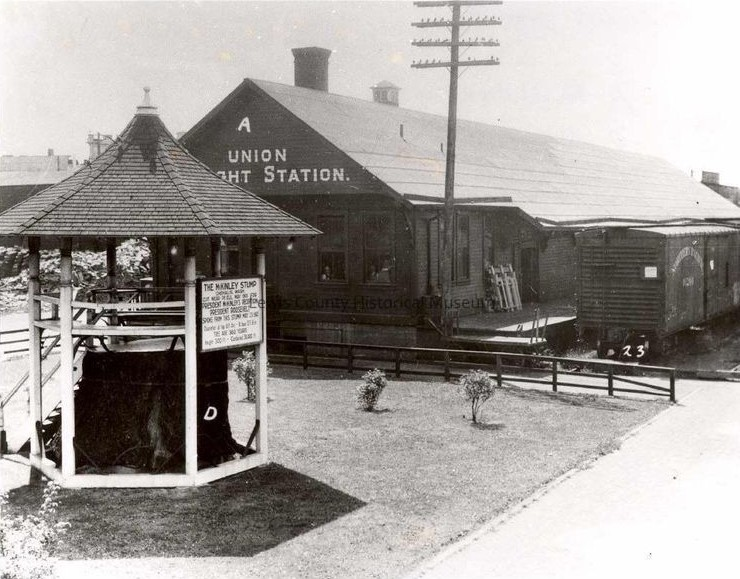
Podium at Union Pacific Freight Office, 1929

As a means to entice a visit by President William McKinley to Lewis County, an 8 foot (2.4 metres) tall (Note: The dimensions of the McKinley Stump vary depending on the source. See sources throughout the page.) remnant of a Douglas fir was cut in May 1901 near Pe Ell (Note: Although the stump is overwhelmingly known to have come from Pe Ell, early news articles report the stump to have been cut down at the nearby sawmill town of McCormick. See sources in the section.) to be of use as a speech pedestal. The fir stump was sawed under the sawmill operations of W.C. Yeomans (Note: A special, Simonds 16 foot (4.9 metres) saw was ordered to cut the stump. The Simonds Manufacturing Company produced 200,000 calendars in 1902, advertising the McKinley Stump and the saw. The calendar was delivered to Australia, South Africa, and several countries in Europe.) and donated by the Southwest Washington Lumbermen's Association. The stump was dated between 360 and 700 years old and given the moniker, the McKinley Stump.

McKinley's visit was cancelled but the city decided the stump would still be of "educator" value and had the landmark shipped from Pe Ell on the Chehalis & South Bend Railroad line. The stump was installed and dedicated during a city-wide Fourth of July celebration in 1901. After a brief welcome message from Chehalis Mayor Francis Donahoe, a reading of the Declaration of Independence was undertaken. A lengthy speech by Frank B. Cole, an editor of the Puget Sound Lumberman, formally dedicated the McKinley Stump. (Note: Whether dignitaries during the McKinley Stump dedication on July 4, 1901, spoke from atop the podium is not reported. See sources in the section.)

Visiting Chehalis later that week, members of a "rivers and harbors" committee under the U.S. House of Representatives viewed the platform with Michigan representative, Roswell P. Bishop, standing atop the stump. Bishop declined an invitation to give a speech but, with "pleasure", promised to inform McKinley of the podium. Theodore Roosevelt used it two years later and William H. Taft employed the stump as a podium in 1907.

The artifact was originally placed in the city's downtown district at the north end of Market Street at the intersection of West Street and National Avenue near the original Northern Pacific Depot. After its installation, the podium became an immediate tourist attraction, especially for train travelers, and plans to build a proper foundation and bandstand-pagoda structure to protect the stump from weather was initiated in January 1902.

In order to raise funds for the protective shelter, a minstrel show was held that April at the Brunswig Grand Opera House and the city approved a $150 appropriation in July. As an expansion and regrade plan of Market Street was undertaken during the time, the stump was planned to be slightly relocated to accommodate the project. The effort to build the cover was undertaken by Anton Hess, struggling to finish the project by the end of 1902 due to "...'nother case of too much prosperity" as a backorder for turned columns waylaid the completion. The pavilion's completion and minor relocation was initiated in February 1903.

The first known vandalism of the McKinley Stump was recorded the following month as carved initials of "thoughtless boys" were found on the top railing surrounding the platform. Vandalization continued as people continued to carve their initials; the wood structure of the pagoda was whittled as well. The city council in 1905 passed a resolution, offering a reward to those who apprehended anyone caught defacing the landmark.

The podium was moved to the city's new Burlington Northern Depot in late September 1914, featured on a grassy lawn area, immediately south of the freight entrance to the depot. Placed on a concrete pad, the post-and-roof cover was "re-painted and repaired". The stump was allowed to reside on the railroad property after a lease was signed by the city. After World War I, a local chapter of the Grand Army of the Republic took the name, McKinley Stump Legion No. 1.

In May 1923, President Warren G. Harding was invited by the Chehalis Citizens' Club to speak from the stump during an early-stage planned trip from Portland to Seattle. A letter arrived from the White House two weeks later stating that the invitation was received but the trip and its itinerary were not yet complete nor formally announced. No definitive answer was given.

Parking shortages in the downtown core led to the first attempts to move the McKinley Stump from the depot in 1951. The removal required the permission of Northern Pacific Railroad, owner of the grounds. The company had been keeping the covered stand in good condition but the podium was reported to have "deteriorated". The stump was finally moved on October 5, 1959, to Recreation Park next to the Chehalis Community Pool. The pagoda temporarily remained behind, moved two days later after it was trimmed by 3 feet (0.9 m), necessitated so that the post-and-roof structure could fit under electrical wires during transport. Although the move was required as the depot site was still planned as a parking space, the landmark was also believed to be relocated because it was "not appreciated" at the train station and deserved to be featured at a "more attractive setting". (Note: Despite evidence to the contrary, reports in following decades mention that the stump was moved to Recreation Park during a vague timeline between the late 1940s and 1950s, often due to incidents of arson.)

The McKinley Stump was damaged due to arson on November 19, 1961. The accused young man, described as a "mental patient", poured gasoline on the podium and lit a fire. The thick bark, hindering the efforts to put out the flames, was chopped off in spots, The underside of the roof and the bench seating were charred. The youth was apprehended shortly thereafter at his home, released after arrest to his parents. Later in March 1962, another act of arson occurred at the stump. The injured areas, at the back of the landmark, were sealed in concrete. (Note: The concrete was painted brown, presumably to match the surrounding hue of the bark.)

In early May 2003, no official ceremony was formally announced or planned by the city for the 100th anniversary of Teddy Roosevelt's 1903 visit; a set of informational placards created by the Lewis County Historical Society were given out during a city council meeting that discussed the anniversary. The society expanded an existing display at the Lewis County Historical Museum. In the days leading up to the centennial, a group known as the Chehalis Valley Amateur Radio Society announced an unknown but year-long plan to broadcast live from the stump on May 23rd, sharing the history of the landmark over the airwaves. The group received a special call sign for the event, "W7A", from the Federal Communications Commission.

=== Renovations and repairs ===
The stump's location was "beautified" in 1905 as the grounds were replanted with sod and white clover in June. Future plans included the placement of a marker that was to mention "material facts of interest" of the fir trunk.

By late 1908, there was concern that the stump was requiring maintenance and the pagoda needed basic upkeep. The main issue was the unimproved plot around the landmark; referred to as an "eyesore", the grounds were bare and lacked sidewalks. A sign at the stump was noted to have misspellings. Cement walkways around the parcel and a fresh coat of paint on the protective cover were completed in May 1909. Improvements of the grounds followed the next month. As part of the effort, electric lights were installed. Six, 16-candle lanterns were placed on each post and a single 32-candle light was hung from the center under the rafters. The "juice" (Note: Electricity was referred to as "juice" in the Chehalis Bee-Nugget report of the lights in June 1909.) was donated by the Twin City Light and Traction Company and the lights were lit for the first time on June 28, 1909.

The protective structure was re-shingled by May 1923 and was repainted, as was a display sign. The sign was repainted again in April 1926.

After the Recreation Park relocation, the stump and its new grounds underwent a renovation in early 1960. Placed on a new cement slab, the eaves and posts of the pagoda were replaced and the roof was re-shingled; additionally, the structure was repainted and a weathervane featuring an eagle was placed atop the roof. A new set of steps up to the platform were built and replacement bench seats on top of the fir trunk were added. A sidewalk leading directly to the landmark, as well as a brick flower box that encircled the stump, were also included. An archway was built with new historical interpretive signage.

=== Decay and replica ===
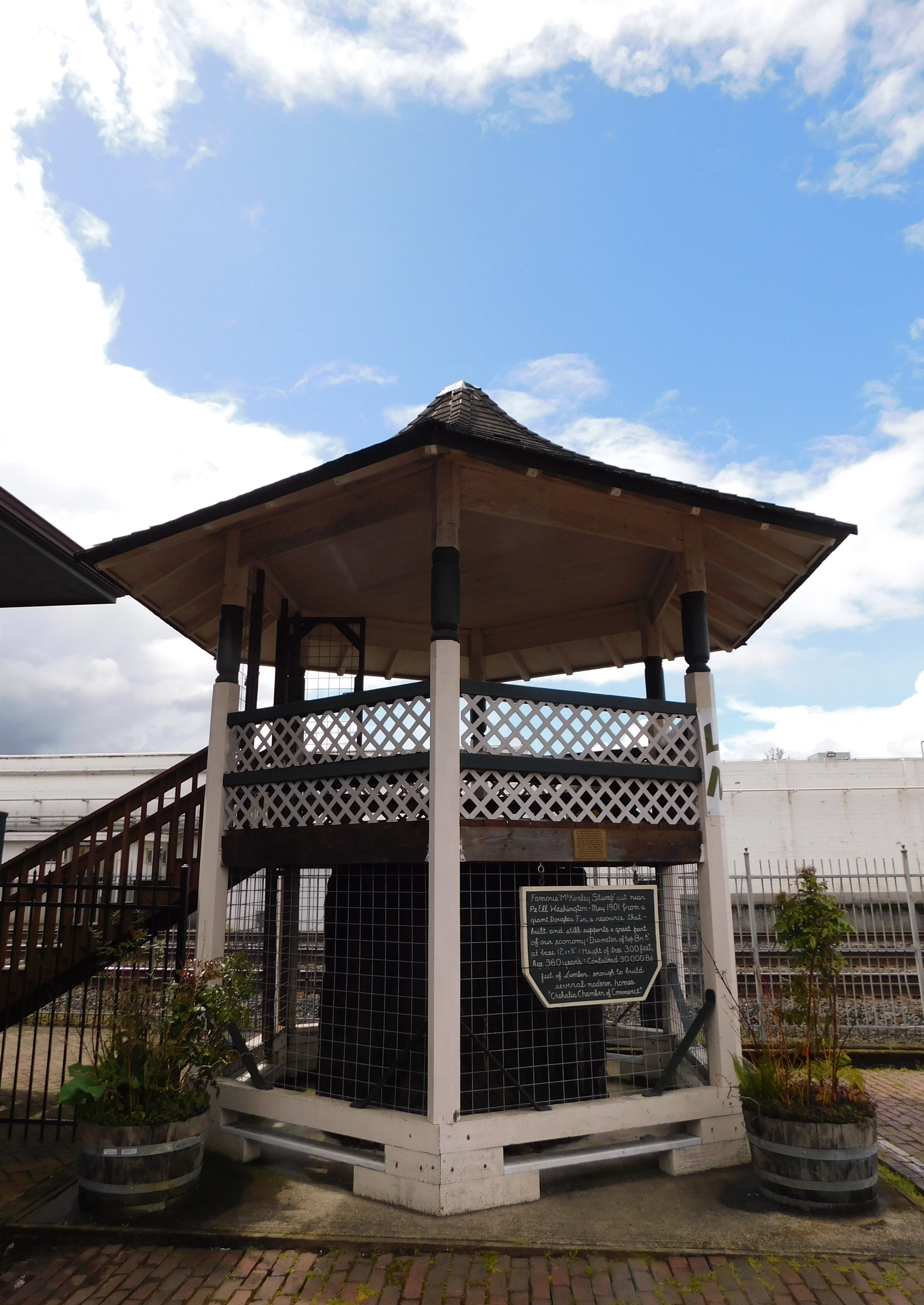
McKinley Stump at Lewis County Historical Museum main entrance, 2024

Several expansion projects were initiated at Recreation Park, necessitating a relocation of the McKinley Stump by 2007. The aging landmark was thought to be standing in the way of a proposed playground area. Additionally, the city believed the tree trunk was not a good fit with plans to "dress up this part of the park and give a welcoming entrance" to Chehalis.

Due to an infestation of carpenter ants and subsequent rot, the historical pulpit was destroyed in October 2007. The decay was expected, but the stump thought to be salvageable; the podium was set to be relocated to the Lewis County Historical Museum once any rot had been treated. However, the extensive, irreparable damage was finally noticed when an arborist cut into the stump. The landmark was placed on its side and the concrete patch removed. Using a borrowed 60 in (150 cm) chainsaw, an 8 in (20 cm) solid slab was cut from the top and preserved, along with a large piece of bark and a few sawn portions. Attempts to save additional parts were impossible as the wood was porous and "really pretty rotten". Saved portions of the tree trunk were put on a temporary display at the museum.

The original protective bandstand-pagoda was kept though inspections found structural issues. It was removed from the park a week prior to the stump's demolition and saved to be used over a reproduction podium. The pagoda was dismantled in pieces, including the roof which was moved in its entirety by crane, and transported by flatcar to a temporary storage facility in the city.

A replica stump, cut from Tenino, was installed on a concrete pad at the Lewis County Historical Museum on January 17, 2008. The new platform was slightly shorter but of similar width to the original McKinley Stump, measured at 6 feet (1.8 m) in height with an approximate diameter of 8 feet (2.4 m). The replica was estimated to be between 500 and 700 years old and was assessed to be worth several thousand dollars. The saved 12 to 14 in (36 cm) thick slab (Note: The measurements of the preserved slab differ in local reporting, originally mentioned as 8 inches (20 cm).) of the original McKinley Stump was to be added to the top of the replica. The reproduced stump was donated by Weyerhaeuser, cut and installed by a local timber company, A-1 Timber.

On June 18, 2008, the original, refurbished pagoda was installed over the podium. The cover received new shingles and was restored by a local business, Meticulous Design.

== Speeches ==
=== Cancelled McKinley visit ===
Planned to visit Chehalis on May 23, 1901, McKinley cancelled his trip after his wife, Ida, became ill. McKinley had been unable to plan a new visit before his assassination in September of that year; he never used the podium. Reports on the McKinley Stump will sometimes mention that President McKinley spoke from his namesake podium despite evidence to the contrary.

=== Theodore Roosevelt visit, 1903 ===
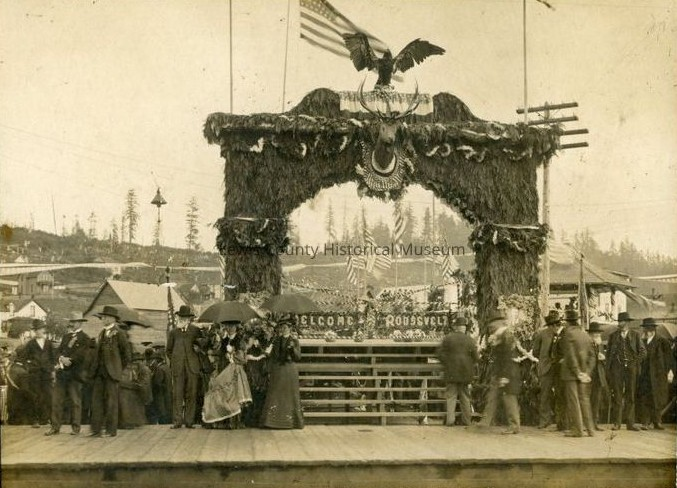
Welcome party and arch for Roosevelt visit, May 22, 1903

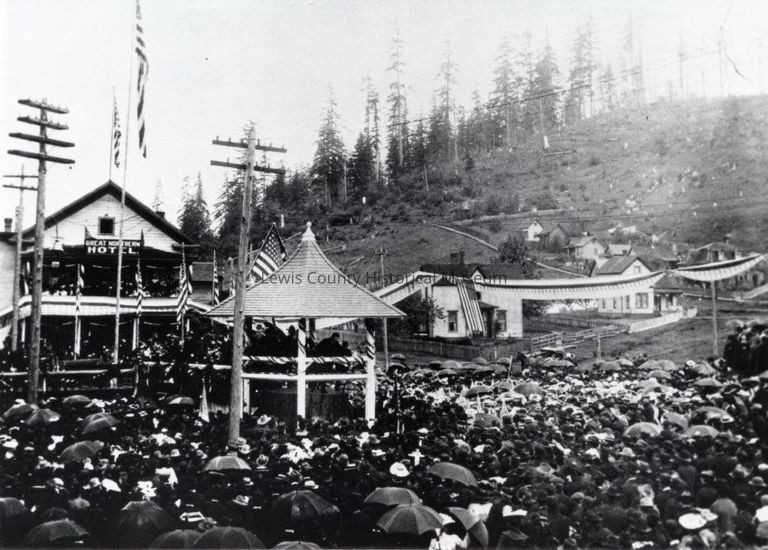
Theodore Roosevelt orating from the stump, 1903

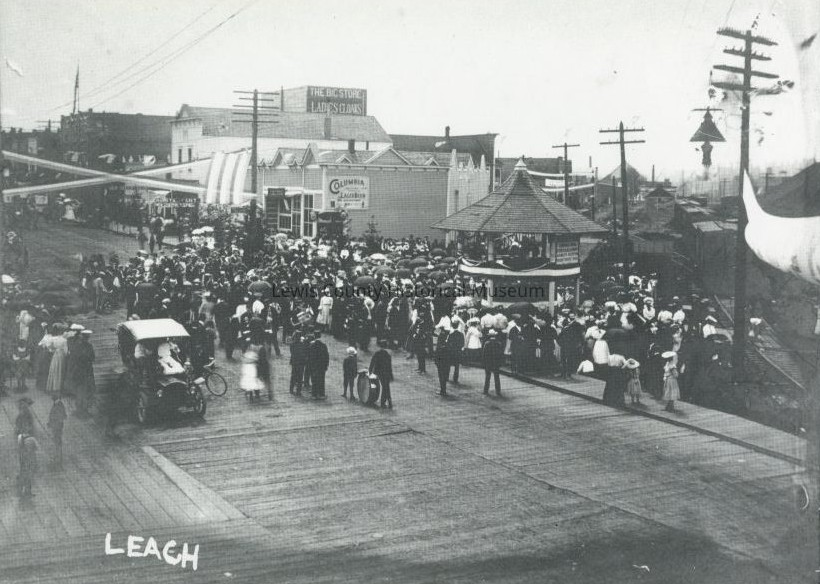
Alternate view of Roosevelt visit, 1903

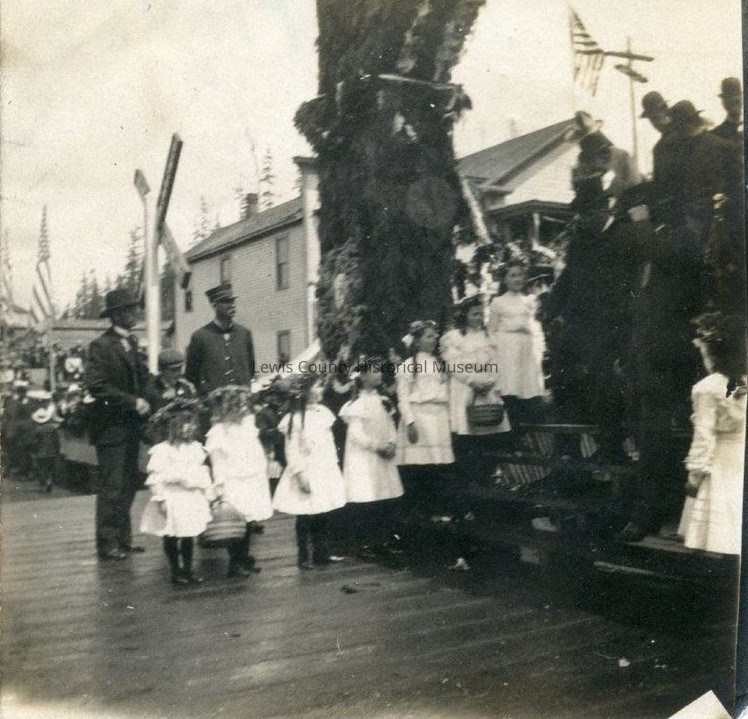
Flower girls greeting dignitaries, Roosevelt visit, 1903

President Theodore Roosevelt was initially invited early 1902 to stop at Chehalis during the early phase of a planned trip to the west coast. The offer, given in person by prominent members of the city, Mr. and Mrs. Daniel Millett of Millett Field, was accepted by Roosevelt.

On May 22, 1903, approximately 10,000 people, including many Chehalins, (Note: The term, "Chehalin", is a common nickname for residents in Chehalis.) welcomed President Roosevelt at the depot when he stopped to give a prepared speech upon the McKinley Stump. The crowd was the largest ever recorded in the city at the time, despite inclement weather in the days prior that prevented visitors in farther reaches of the county from attending. Hotels and other lodging houses in Chehalis were "taxed to their utmost capacity". Two train trips from Napavine were made to bring in people for the event. Additional coaches were added and were still overcrowded; persons were viewed riding on top of the passenger cars. A train from South Bend had an additional ten coaches.

The second stop into Washington state during his trip, Roosevelt was first welcomed at Kalama by Governor Henry McBride. In preparation of his visit, Chehalis decorated the city core and outfitted the train depot with an ornamented archway of bunting, evergreen fronds, and flags. A pair of elk horns were placed on the arch. The large display, with the words, "Welcome Roosevelt" done in daisies, was meant as an opening gate, introducing Roosevelt to the city. An elevated walkway led directly to the stump which was "beautifully decorated". A parade, featuring a band from the Washington State Training School, wound through downtown on Market Street.

The stump was described as "a monster" by the local newspaper or as "mammoth" in news wire reports. A slight rain shower began moments before the festivities began but cleared as the event opened at approximately 11:30 am. Roosevelt's private passenger car arrived at the arch and he was welcomed by the mayor. While on the walkway, Roosevelt was greeted by ten school-age flower girls and met several prominent members of Chehalis. Roosevelt also shook hands with the Hazard family (Note: The Hazard family named is sometimes spelled as "Hazzard" depending on the source. See sources throughout the page for the discrepancy.) whose sons helped to capture General Emilio Aguinaldo during the Spanish-American War. Local schoolchildren and veterans of the Grand Army of the Republic were in attendance; both groups were seated in a roped-off section in front of the podium.

Roosevelt thanked the community, especially for its support during the war, and mentioned that if people in the crowd did not consider themselves expansionists, he wanted to "know what was the matter with you". Roosevelt stated that Washington state residents were "true to the practices and principles" similar to that of the soldiers who fought in the recent war, mentioning the men who captured Aguinaldo for comparison. He expressed gratitude for the region's economy, particularly in agriculture, mining, and timber, and congratulated parents on having a wonderful "crop of children".

The 15-minute scheduled speech lasted for 23 minutes despite several reminders to Roosevelt that his speech was running long. Roosevelt was reported to be "jolly" and the crowd responded enthusiastically to his laughter, once humorously mentioning that the cheers coming from children meant that "their lungs were all right". The speech included more serious advice, speaking to children that when they play, to "play hard" but "when you work, don't play at all". He also had words of admiration for those who employed in hard work and a distaste for those who did not. Roosevelt stated that despite social standing, an idle person was to viewed as pitiful and with contempt.

The only life worth living in the long run is the life of effort, the life of striving to accomplish something; and the man or woman who makes up his or her mind that the thing to do is to endeavor only to have a soft and easy time and to shirk duty is not only sure to be a poor citizen but a pretty unhappy one in addition.

— President Theodore Roosevelt,
McKinley Stump speech, May 22, 1903

Before he reboarded the train to continue his campaign in Centralia, the president was given a piece of copper and pyrite ore on an inscribed silver platter by John Welty, a state legislature senator, on behalf of the St. Helens mining district. Roosevelt shook hands or patted the faces of the flower girls on his walk back to his railcar. He thanked the mayor expressing his appreciation for the crowd and the city's welcome. His parting words were directed towards children from the Washington state reform school, reminding them to "be good". The festivities continued after Roosevelt departed, which included a baseball game between Chehalis and South Bend. (Note: The Chehalis baseball team defeated South Bend, 14-6. Chehalis pitcher, Harry Quick, struck out 18 batters.)

Although extra members of the United States Marshals Service had been assigned to the event, the crowd was reported to be "good natured", cooperative, and there was no "slightest difficulty with anyone at any time".

=== William H. Taft visit, 1907 ===
During the 1908 United States presidential election, Indiana senator Charles W. Fairbanks and future president, William Howard Taft, then serving as Secretary of War, used the stump on September 7, 1907, for prepared speeches. Though with less fanfare than Roosevelt, Taft was welcomed at his train car and a procession, led by the training school band, marched a short distance from the depot to the stump. Taft spoke for approximately 10 minutes in front of a crowd of "several hundred people" and school children.

It's a joke to settle international questions by war.

— Secretary of War, William H. Taft,
McKinley Stump speech, September 7, 1907

Speaking after Fairbanks, Taft deigned that his speech could only hope to be as inspirational as "the eloquence that doubtless fell from the lips" of Roosevelt and other dignitaries of the stump's past. He mentioned that Chehalis was a happy community and referred to women as "pretty" and the men as "strong". The Hazard soldiers were mentioned once again, using the connection to expound on peace efforts in the Philippines. Taft spoke on broader political platforms such as further stability in the world, democratic freedom, economic prosperity, and warnings against isolationism. Before his prepared marks were finished, Taft was interrupted by a train whistle; he was reported to be "annoyed" at the distraction but continued "happily". (Note: Whether Taft spoke atop the stump or beside it depends on the source. Years after Taft's visit, reports mention that he spoke alongside the stump, not on top of the podium, despite reports immediately after the speech stating otherwise. See sources throughout the article for the discrepancy.)

A report on the visit by the Chehalis Bee-Nugget mentioned that the crowd was pleased with Taft, who spoke in an earnest and sincere manner, while also mentioning that his physique was "magnificent" and "splendidly proportioned" despite his weight of over 300 pounds (140 kg). Taft, in 1909 and as president, was invited by the city to speak again from the stump in 1909; he was said to be "delighted" at the prospect. The city created "President Taft Day" on October 11, 1911, commemorating his only visit to Chehalis; Taft was invited less than a week prior to the festivities.

=== Other dignitaries ===
Fairbanks had previously spoken atop from the stump, eulogizing McKinley a speech on October 1, 1904. He noted the podium's "solidity", spoke "that there was no better platform to speak from" than the McKinley Stump, and believed the landmark to have been "fittingly dedicated" by Roosevelt the prior year.

Also during the 1908 campaign, Indiana senator Albert J. Beveridge spoke from the platform in early October 1907 to a crowd of approximately 200 people for a few minutes in support of Taft. Eugene Debs, during his 1908 presidential attempt, used the stump in a prepared speech. On August 21, 1920, vice-presidential candidate Franklin D. Roosevelt addressed a Chehalis crowd from the McKinley platform. The ten-minute speech focused on forsaking the Democratic Party agendas of the past. The "fair-sized" crowd was reported to be there either out of curiosity or were Republican voters, as Roosevelt, described as "slender and active, with a pleasant smile and interesting personality", did not receive "great applause". (Note: Franklin Roosevelt's visit in 1920 seemed to induce little fanfare even in local newspapers. The Chehalis Bee-Nugget did not mention his visit until a week later and placed the small article near the back end of the issue.) Later in October, nominees of the Socialist Party of America, including Homer T. Bone, spoke from the fir trunk. In front of a "fair crowd", Bone spoke briefly, focusing on taxation.

During a Senate campaign stop in October 2004, U.S. Representative George Nethercutt spoke next to the stump. Lasting less than fifteen minutes, the crowd of dozens was reported to be "enthusiastic".

== Dimensions and features ==
=== McKinley Stump ===
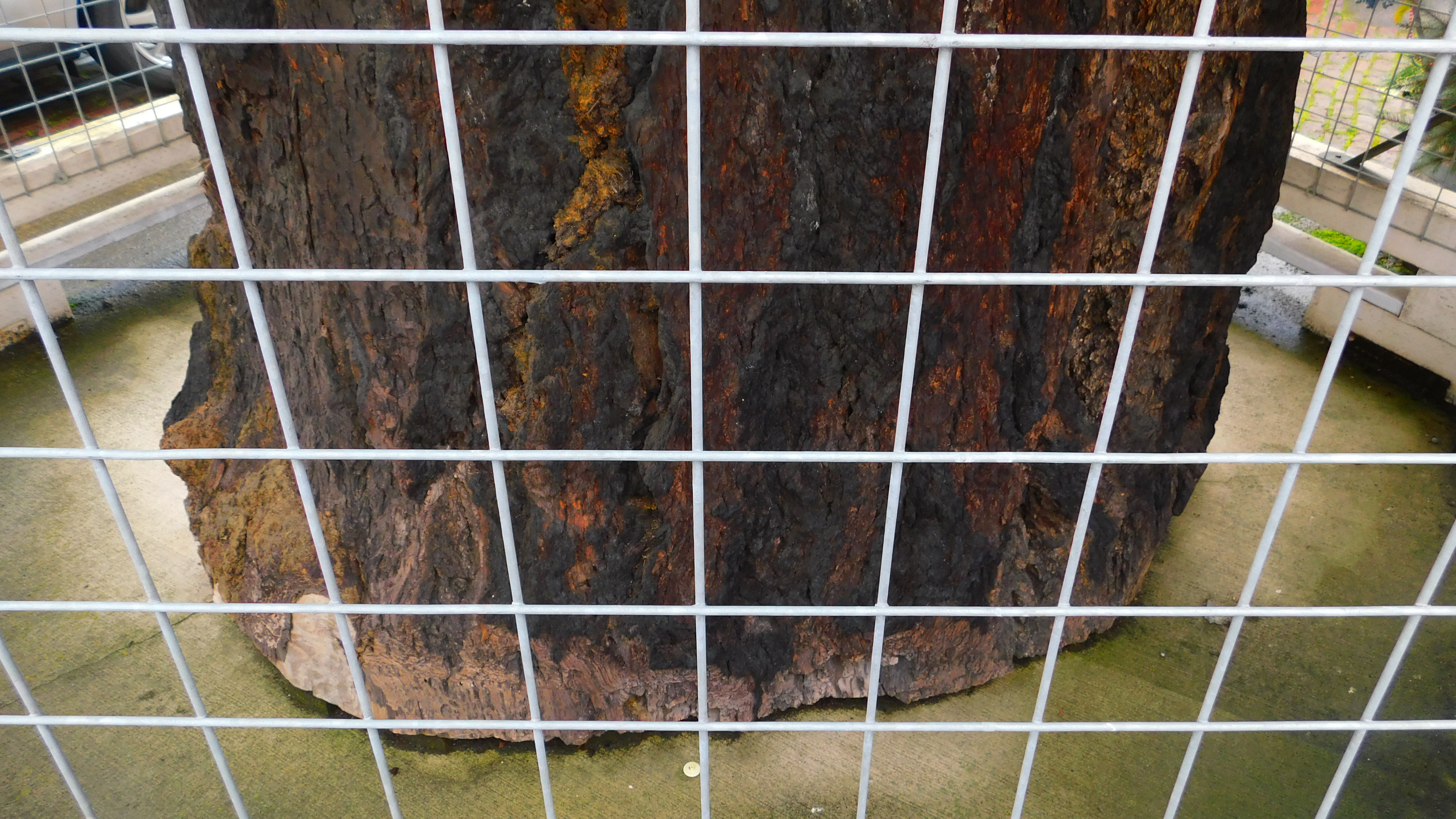
Replica stump, 2025

Dimensions and descriptions of the McKinley Stump differ depending on the source. A 1901 news article by The Morning Oregonian of Portland mentioned the stump of "green fir" to be 9 feet (2.7 m) in diameter and 12 feet (3.7 m) tall. As reported by the Chehalis Bee-Nugget in April 1902 and again in May 1903, the stump came from a Douglas fir measuring 28 feet (8.5 m) in circumference with a height of 8 feet (2.4 m); the age of the trunk was originally estimated at 600 years. After McKinley's death, the age of the tree was reported to be 360 years of age. In 1916, the Bee-Nugget newspaper lists the height of the stump as 8 feet (2.4 m), becoming a measurement most commonly used in later mentions of the podium. The American Lumberman magazine reported more detailed dimensions in 1920, agreeing on the elevation of the platform. The report further clarified the diameters of the platform, 12 feet (3.7 m), 6-inch (15 cm) at the base and 8 feet (2.4 m), 4-inch (10 cm) at the top.

A metal band was noted in 1919 to already have been in place along the outside of the landmark to "hold the bark on". The bark was reported to be 4 inches (10 cm) to 5 inches (13 cm) thick.

The stump came from a tree estimated to measure 300 feet (91.4 m) tall and possibly contained 30,000 board feet of lumber. The estimated value was listed at $250, equivalent to $8,958 in 2025. The stump itself was listed to contain 3,000 board feet and weighed about 4 tonnes (4.0 t).

=== Pagoda ===
By 1919, the stump's roof was reported to be coated in tin. The platform's pagoda was originally as tall as 20 feet (6.1 m) but shorted to approximately 17 feet (5.2 m) after the 1959 relocation. Although the stump's canopy is considered as the original 1902 structure, (Note: The pagoda is often reported to have been built in 1901 in later contradictory mentions, despite early accounts detailing the construction beginning in 1902 and finalized in early 1903. It is possible the discrepancy exists as a call for a protective pavilion began in late-1901. See sources throughout the page for the discrepancy.) the 1960 renovation and the restoration during the 2007-2088 relocation has removed several initial elements of the bandstand-pagoda.
