= Lintott-Alexander Park =

Park in Chehalis, Washington

- Alexander Park
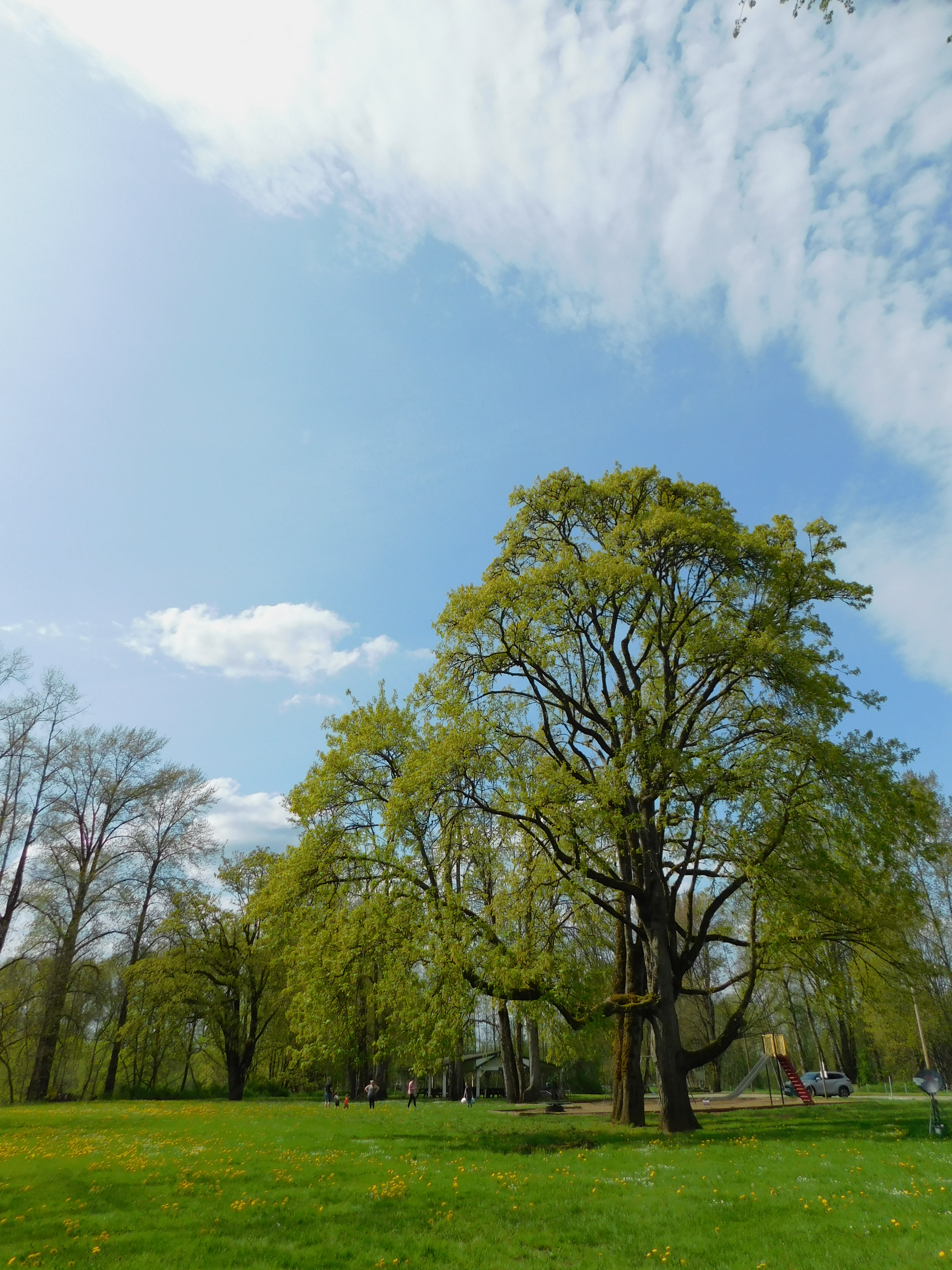
- Lintott-Alexander Park, 2022

- Location within Washington (state)
- Type: Playground, picnic, water access
- Coordinates: 46°39′08″N 122°58′59″W
- Area: 6-acre (2.4 ha)
- Created: approximately 1920
- Founder: Family of John Alexander
- Status: Open; occasional flood closures
- Paths: Perimeter walking path
- Terrain: Flat, river bank
- Water: Confluence of Chehalis and Newaukum rivers
- Threatened by: Flooding
- Parking: Vehicle parking; 50+
- Facilities: Covered picnic areas, bathrooms

Lintott-Alexander Park is a 6-acre (2.4 ha) park in Chehalis, Washington, located west of I-5 and south of Washington State Route 6. Due to its location in a bend of the Chehalis River and at the confluence of the Newaukum River, the park can flood in most years.

The park, which hosted a sandy beach and deep swimming hole, was an early recreation spot for residents in and around Chehalis in the early 20th century. During Alexander Park's peak, the site was used for two world record-setting events, the largest shortcake in 1928 and a 7,200 egg omelet in 1931.

The grounds began to wane by the 1980s and was shut down for several years before local, volunteer donations and efforts renovated the park in the early 21st century.

== History ==
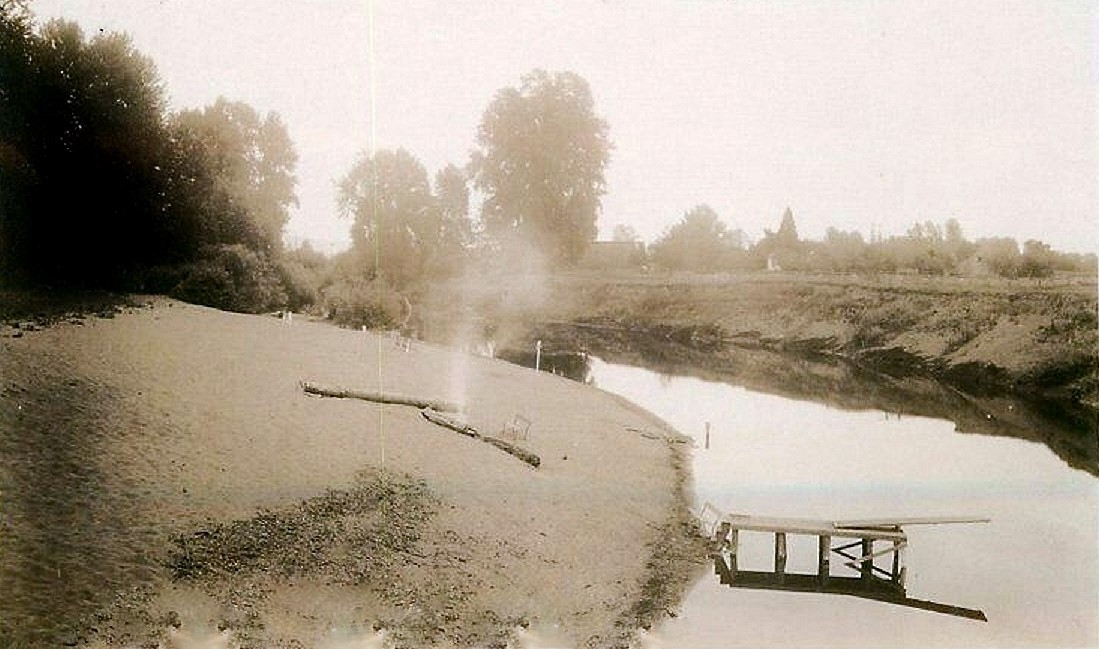
The sandy beach of Alexander Park

Locally referred to as Alexander Park after the family who owned the grounds, the land was used as a park by the regional population before it was donated to the city of Chehalis. The park, situated in a curve of the Chehalis River, was known at the time for its deep swimming hole, also known locally as the Ol' Swimmin' Hole, and its sandy beach.

Initial offers by the Alexander family to donate the land for a park began in 1919 and in April 1920, the 4.5-acre (1.8 ha) parcel was deeded to the city in exchange for city water and sewer services to the area. Plans such as the building of bath houses, water and sewer systems, and more accommodating access from Ocean Beach Highway, were undertaken before it was to be officially transferred. The Alexander family formally donated the land to the city during a picnic on July 26, 1920.

The land had been under renovation for use as a park for some time and at its official transfer, funds were still required to fully open the site. In addition to the early improvements, the park once contained a boardwalk, outdoor kitchens, playgrounds, and a wading pool; a baseball field was located in the park during the 1930s as well as a grandstand which was repaired, along with other parts of the park, in 1946.

In 1924, the Alexander family donated an additional acre to expand the recreation area and a 20 foot (6.1 metres) diving platform was constructed. That same year, the park, reported as a "popular tourist resort", hosted 2,000 visitors and overnight automobile stays of over 1,500. A radio antenna was installed on the grounds in 1925. A minor outbreak of typhoid in the city in 1926 was connected to the river and all swimming at the park was temporarily suspended.

The park was noted on a national level in 1928 for hosting the baking of the "World's Largest Strawberry Shortcake" and again three years later for the cooking of a record-breaking omelet. The grounds were the gathering place in the 1920s and 1930s for the city's annual Farmers and Merchants Picnic, a joint festival begun in 1917 from an existing farmers event. Hosted by local businesses and farmers, the festivities were held to advertise the community's economic progress and capabilities.

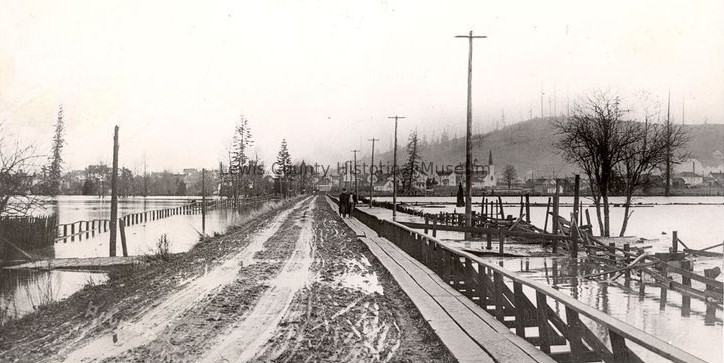
Floodwaters at Alexander Park, 1910

Due to the parks location on the Chehalis River, several severe floods of the park have occurred. A major flood occurred during December 1933 that eroded the banks of the Chehalis River at the park, jeopardizing the loss of the beach. A severe flood event in 1975 submerged Alexander Park leading to extensive damages at the site, with roads leading to the park washed out.

The city briefly turned the park's responsibility over to the Boy Scouts in the 1980s. With increasing liability concerns due to vandalism, coupled with budget and maintenance issues, the park became "overgrown and abandoned" and was closed by the city in 1988. In 2004, a prior resident, Jim Lintott, donated $25,000 in honor of his father, beginning a movement to renovate the closed park. He raised his donation to $100,000 and other contributions followed quickly, including a donation raised by a local power plant and its employees to commemorate a local Chehalis resident, Traci Hampton. The following year, an additional pavilion was needed and Lintott donated the funds to cover the project.

The restored park was renamed officially as Robert E. Lintott-Alexander Park with permission from the Alexander family and reopened with playgrounds, sport courts, picnic areas, and a perimeter walking path; future maintenance is to be overseen by the Chehalis Foundation and voluntary efforts of the community.

=== World's Largest Strawberry Shortcake ===
Alexander Park was the site of the creation of the World's Largest Strawberry Shortcake. The unveiling of the cake was held on July 20, 1928 during the city's annual Farmers and Merchants Picnic. The shortcake was baked and decorated by local businesses and residents. A queen and royal escort were chosen by vote for the festivities, with voting totals in the millions, and the city shut down businesses for the day.

News reports at the time reported a range of measurements for the shortcake, varying from 11 feet (3.4 m) to 16 feet (4.9 m) tall with a width spanning greatly between 8 feet (2.4 m) to 35 feet (10.7 m). The 1,200 lb (540 kg) to 1,500 lb (680 kg) dessert was made with 4,000 pieces of shortcake. Baked using up to 2,000 eggs and between 300 pounds (140 kg) and 700 pounds (320 kg) of flour, the cake contained up to 900 US quarts (850 L) of strawberries. Decorations included baskets and flowers made of sugar and chocolate as well as a display of Mt. St. Helens. The picnic also included a "husband calling contest" and several sports, such as tug-of-war and nail driving. Attendance was estimated to reached as high as 5,000 people and the keynote speaker was M.L. Spencer, president of the University of Washington. Four movie companies were on hand to film the event, in one instance giving credit to Seattle rather than Chehalis; the chamber of commerce in Seattle, which seemed to appropriate the confusion for advertising purposes, apologized for the mix up.

World's Largest Strawberry Shortcake, 1928

Queen Agnes Young and her court, 1928

=== World's Largest Omelet ===
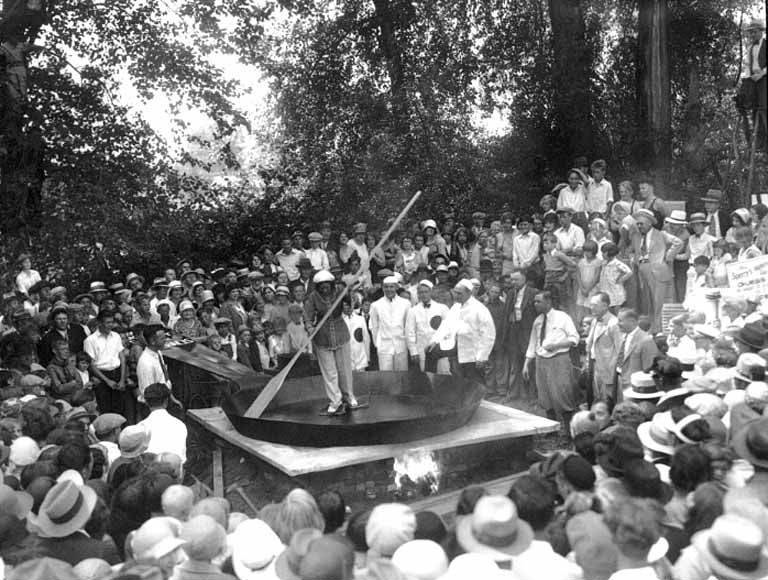
World's Largest Omelet, Alexander Park, July 24, 1931

On July 24, 1931, during a Farmers and Merchants Picnic, the park hosted a record-breaking event where a 7,200 egg omelet (Note: Early reporting about the event lists the number of eggs used as 10,000, however the pan could not fit that many eggs. See sources already listed in the section.) was cooked in a 1/2-ton custom-built frying pan. The gathering, also known as the Egg Festival, was attended by an estimated crowd of 7,000 to 8,000 people, backing up traffic into the city's residential areas.

The picnic was originally planned to boil 10,000 eggs but a decision to make an omelet instead won out. A 9 foot (2.7 metres) brick oven was built for the occasion and the 8 foot (2.4 metres) frying pan, constructed by a Seattle-based company, was displayed in the city the week before the picnic. The skillet was greased by tying bacon to the bottoms of the feet of several volunteers who would skate around the pan. An egg-cracking contest was held and representatives from Fox and Movietone News attended to document the ceremonies. A variety of sporting competitions were held, including plow polo. A vaudeville act was staged and the festival was attended by the governor, Clarence D. Martin. Approximately 7,000 dishes of ice cream, 120 US gallons (450 L; 100 imp gal) of coffee, and 4,000 US gallons (15,000 L; 3,300 imp gal) of lemonade were handed out to spectators. After the event, the frying pan was put on temporary display throughout the city, including at the Peacock Theater where movie reels of the record omelet festival filmed by Universal Pictures were also shown.

Another attempt to set an omelet record was held at the 20th annual picnic in 1935. Containing 6,000 locally provided eggs, the omelet also used other regional ingredients, including 250 pounds (110 kg) of Darigold cheese.

== See also ==
- Parks and recreation in Chehalis, Washington
