= Lewis County Jail =

County jail in Washington state

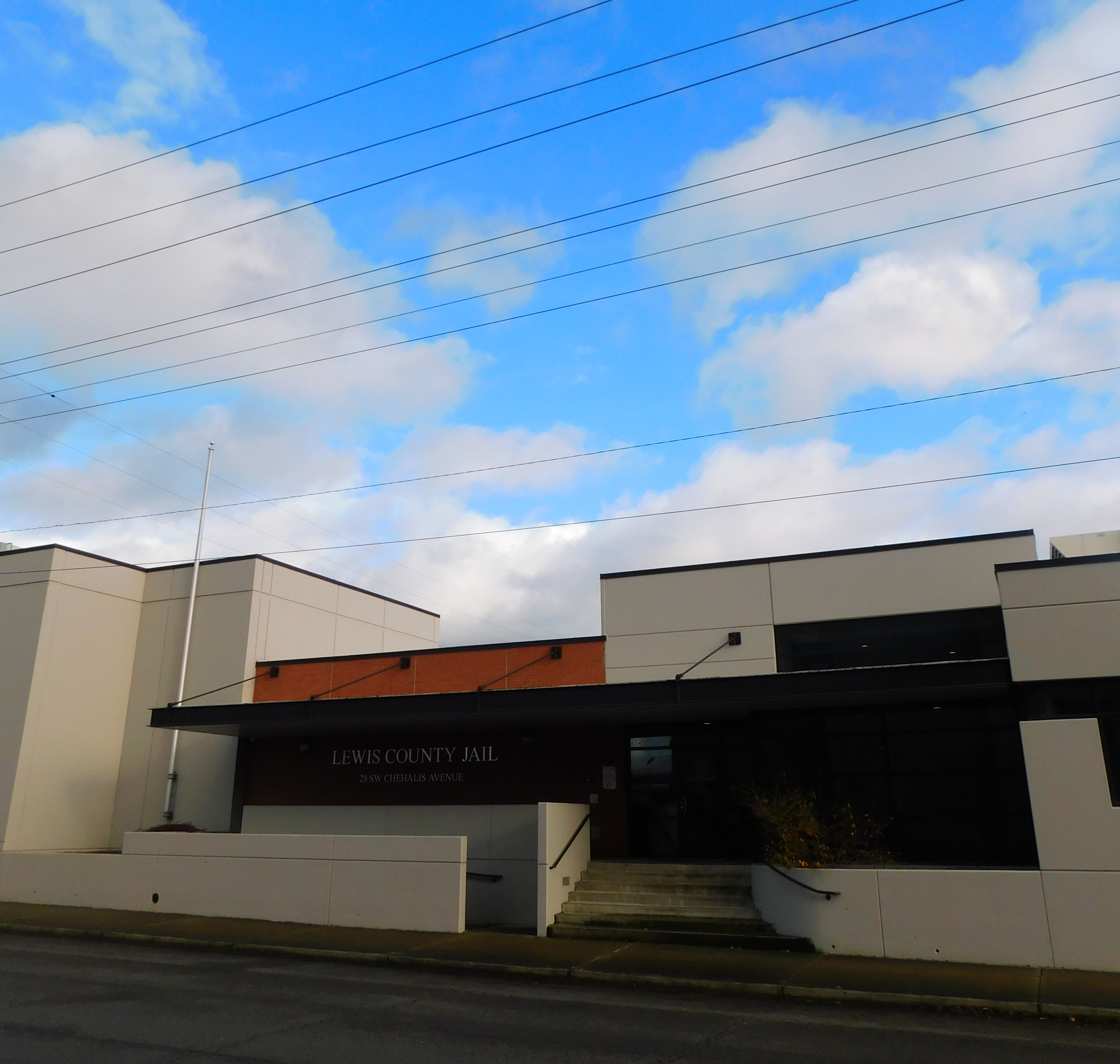
- Main entrance, Lewis County Jail, 2025
- Interactive map of Lewis County Jail
- Location: 28 SW Chehalis Avenue, Chehalis, Lewis County, Washington; 46°39′37.6″N 122°58′10.1″W
- Status: Operational
- Security class: County jail
- Capacity: 356
- Population: 163 (daily average) (2024)
- Opened: 2004
- Managed by: Lewis County Corrections Bureau
- Website: Lewis County Jail - Corrections Bureau

The Lewis County Jail is a county jail located in Chehalis, Washington. The facility is part of the Lewis County Courthouse campus.

Due to prison overcrowding that had been a concern in Lewis County since the late 19th century, proposals to build a modern, larger jail were introduced in the 1990s. An expanded Lewis County Jail was constructed, opening in 1996, and was a continuation of an existing jail area in the Lewis County Law and Justice Center. Overcrowding remained an issue, with minimum security inmates housed in a Quonset hut beginning in 1999. During the late 1990s, the jail gained notoriety for the reintroduction of chain gangs, as well as reductions in food staples and privileges. Meals were replaced with MREs.

The current Lewis County Jail facility was completed in 2004 and can hold up to 356 prisoners.

== Background ==
=== First county jail ===
The first official courthouse in Chehalis was begun in the spring of 1874; the building was completed a few months later in June on a cleared acre of land at the corner of North Street and State Avenue. A small judicial campus was built on the block, including a building for a county jail, possibly the first in Lewis County.

=== Barrett Block Courthouse jail ===
The prison was moved possibly by 1899 to the city's second courthouse, the Barrett Block Courthouse, located in the original downtown district of Chehalis, a block east of the first courthouse. The jail was overcrowded and convict escapes were common. New jail cells were added in February 1908 and later again in July. When the Barrett Courthouse was torn down in 1932, workers searched to find $50 in gold that was supposedly hidden by a prisoner in the jail cell area; an old bottle of liquor was found instead.

=== Lewis County Courthouse jail ===
The first phase of the construction of the Lewis County Courthouse included the build of a jail floor by December 1925.

The jail area measured 40 ft × 50 ft (12 m × 15 m) and the cells were constructed to provide separate units specifically for more violent offenders; unconnected cells were built for women and youths. The original partitioned jail cell space contained a bullpen and solitary confinement room. At the time of the dedication, escape from the jail was reported as "practically impossible".

Overcrowding of the jail led to expansion efforts in 1972, with the possibility to consolidate the county prison with jails in the Twin Cities of Centralia. The proposed expansions were found "unfeasible" and alternatives were never brought to fruition. The courthouse jail remained overcrowded and was condemned in 1985. Prisoners were moved to the Lewis County Law and Justice Center annex where the issue of overcrowding remained.

== History ==
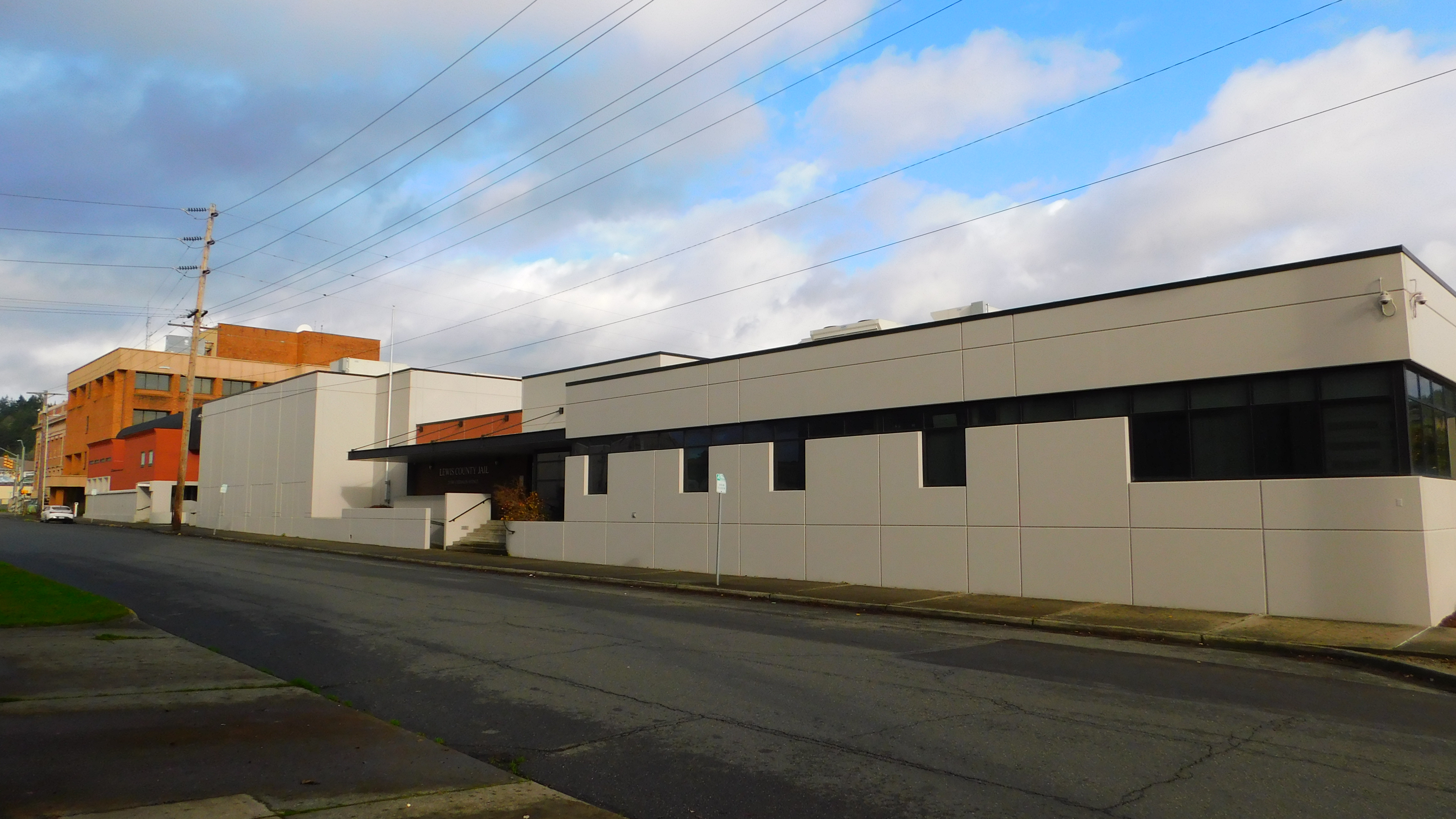
Lewis County Jail facilities, 2025

=== Construction and opening ===
The beginnings of an expanded Lewis County Jail started in 1994 after the county approved a $1.5 million project. The jail was planned to abut the Lewis County Law and Justice Center to the south, be four-stories tall, and contain a minimum security facility on the second floor. The Lewis County Public Utilities District was required to move several power lines underground and an existing single-story commercial building was demolished. Originally planned to be operational in October 1995, the facilities weren't open for use until February 1996; the first people to overnight at the new jail were not inmates but displaced residents in the aftermath of the 100-year flood of 1996.

The minimum security floor became known as the Congregate Residential Facility in 1996 and prisoners held for minor crimes were the first inmates in the jail; the floor was planned for a maximum occupancy of 50 inmates. Male prisoners of more serious offenses remained housed at the Law and Justice Center jail area. By 2000, the annex jail facility was significantly exceeding its limits. Designed at the time to house only 68 prisoners, with an additional 12 spaces made available over the years, the jail averaged approximately 135 felons. The women's cells were also beyond capacity, holding as many as 44 in an area designed for an occupancy of six.

In 1997, Sheriff John McCroskey instituted a cost-reduction effort at the jail. Military rations, known as Meal, Ready-to-Eat (MREs), were used and certain staples, such as coffee, pepper, and salt, were no longer supplied to inmates. At the time, the only other county jail to use MREs was in Mason County. Opposition to the measures offered differing options, such as an increase in funding and use of educational and training programs, rehabilitation, and alternative means to imprisonment; McCroskey, who was elected sheriff in 1994, (Note: Sheriff McCroskey was re-elected in 1998 and 2002.) replied that his job required him to house inmates "as cheaply as possible" and that "rehabilitation is not my job". The sheriff, believing the prisoners lived better "than some of the people that live in my county", also ordered a curtailment of television privileges and health care. The cuts lowered the daily cost per inmate per day by $3, equivalent to $6 in 2025.

The jail and McCroskey received nationwide and international attention for the stricter measures; the sheriff admitted he was "horribly embarrassed" by, and did not understand, the attention but was doing the job he was hired to do. He was quoted as stating that the inmates had to save themselves. Inmates during this time period still had access to classes for anger management, General Educational Development (GED), and substance abuse.

Are porpions (portions) are not enough to feed a little kid. This is not rite. So I will not ever come back.

— Letter from a Lewis County Jail prisoner, c. 1997,
The News Tribune, March 27, 1997

Perfect. That's exactly what I want.

— Sheriff John McCroskey, in response, 1997,
The News Tribune, March 27, 1997

By October 1997, the Lewis County Jail was reported to be "spartan and miserable" under McCroskey's oversight, with a backup of prisoners requesting chain gang work detail, a program instituted by the sheriff in August; (Note: The chain gang program was thought to be the first use of the punishment method in Washington state in decades. The workers were dressed in orange jumpsuits though Sheriff McCroskey did entertain the idea of using striped jail uniforms. The van used to transport prisoners to work sites was labeled, "Lewis County Sheriff's Chain Gang".) the work detail was influenced by the actions of Joe Arpaio. Use of profanity, or being injured while working, led to additional punitive actions. McCroskey was further quoted to believe that social programs to alleviate crime was a "big lie" and that he was "into responsibility", stating that a person's poor upbringing or "something ridiculous like that" was inconducive to proper law enforcement and incarceration. The sheriff also stated that he wanted to replace the prison's exercise space with more jail cells.

To alleviate the overcrowding issue, a Quonset hut that was purchased in 1999 was used by minimum-security inmates as quarters beginning in late 2000, replacing the Congregate Residential Facility. The lack of jail space also required the county to temporarily refuse the transfer of certain state parolees to the jail. The measure, instituted by Sheriff McCroskey, also cited a lack of reimbursement by the state for prisoners transferred to county jails.

=== Expansion ===
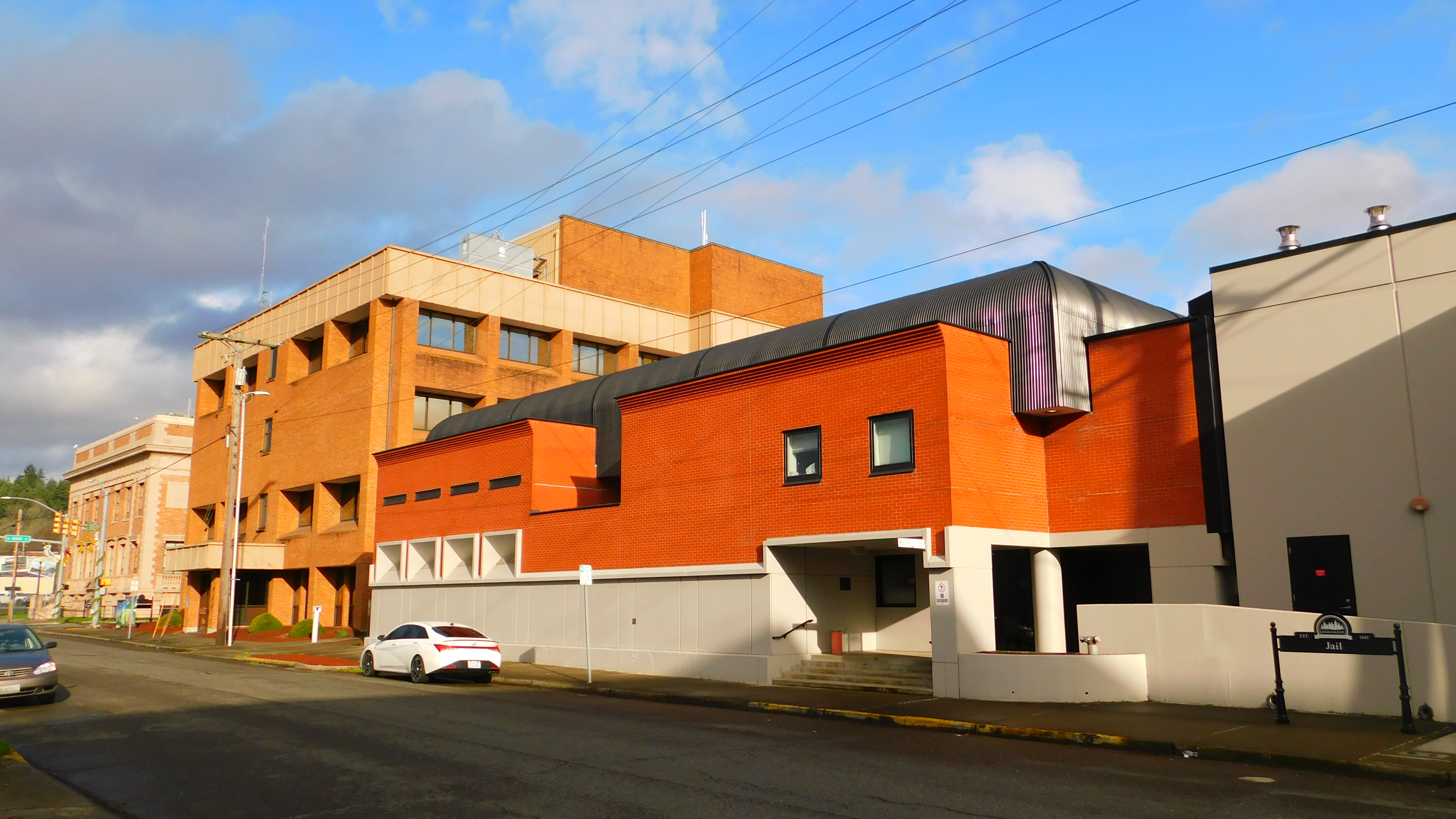
Lewis County Law and Justice Center and jail facilities, 2025

The county approved a $36.7 million plan in September 1999 to renovate the courthouse and provide expanded facilities which included the construction of a 4-story jail. The plan was to be financially supported by various bonds, sale of existing county buildings and property, and revenues generated by the county. In December 2001, the county approved another jail expansion plan, a $12.37 million facility three times the size of the combined capacity of the annex jail, the 1996 expansion, and Quonset hut.

A ground-breaking ceremony was held in March 2003 and the Quonset hut was removed. The project's costs rose to $18 million and the facility, considered a wing of the existing jail system, was planned for a maximum hold of 356 prisoners. The annex cell area was to be remodeled into a high-security section, producing a "unified lockup" between the old and new buildings. Within a few months, the cost rose again to $20 million, with funding provided by various bonds and a sales tax increase. Additional monies were expected to be raised by renting jail beds to regional jurisdictions outside of the county.

A live webcam was installed in June 2003 to show the progress of the build but a labor strike occurred that same month, leading to a postponement of the new Lewis County Jail campus from June 2024 to September of that year. The jail opened with a ribbon-cutting ceremony on October 13, 2004 and visitors were able to tour the new wing during an open house.

The Lewis County Jail expansion boasted modern security features of the time, including touch-screen computer systems that controlled the locks and doors in the jail and video booths for visitation rather than face-to-face conversations. Other notable upgrades were an improved medical wing for incarcerated individuals and additional safety measures for staff. A major focus for the new jail was less movement of prisoners, and less visitation time, methods meant to alleviate potential conflicts in the prisoner population and more effective security in the building. The facility was considered impressive but concerns were noted over cost and the social necessity for the expanded facility. The jail area in the annex wasn't completed until early 2004, delayed due to permitting concerns and various contractor and supply issues. The final construction cost was reported as $18.2 million.

Sheriff McCroskey retired in February 2005, two years before his term was complete, citing a tiredness of dealing with low funding and the Washington State Legislature.

The jail was in lockdown during a bomb threat against the Lewis County Law and Justice Center in December 2019. No explosives were found.

== Operations ==
Beginning in October 2019, the Lewis County Jail serves, via a contractual agreement, as an overflow jail facility for Thurston County, Washington. As of 2024, no prisoners have actually been transferred to the Lewis County Jail and the contract was extended to the end of 2025.

== See also ==
- Green Hill School
