= 1996 Pacific Northwest floods =

1996 floods in Washington, Oregon, and Idaho, United States

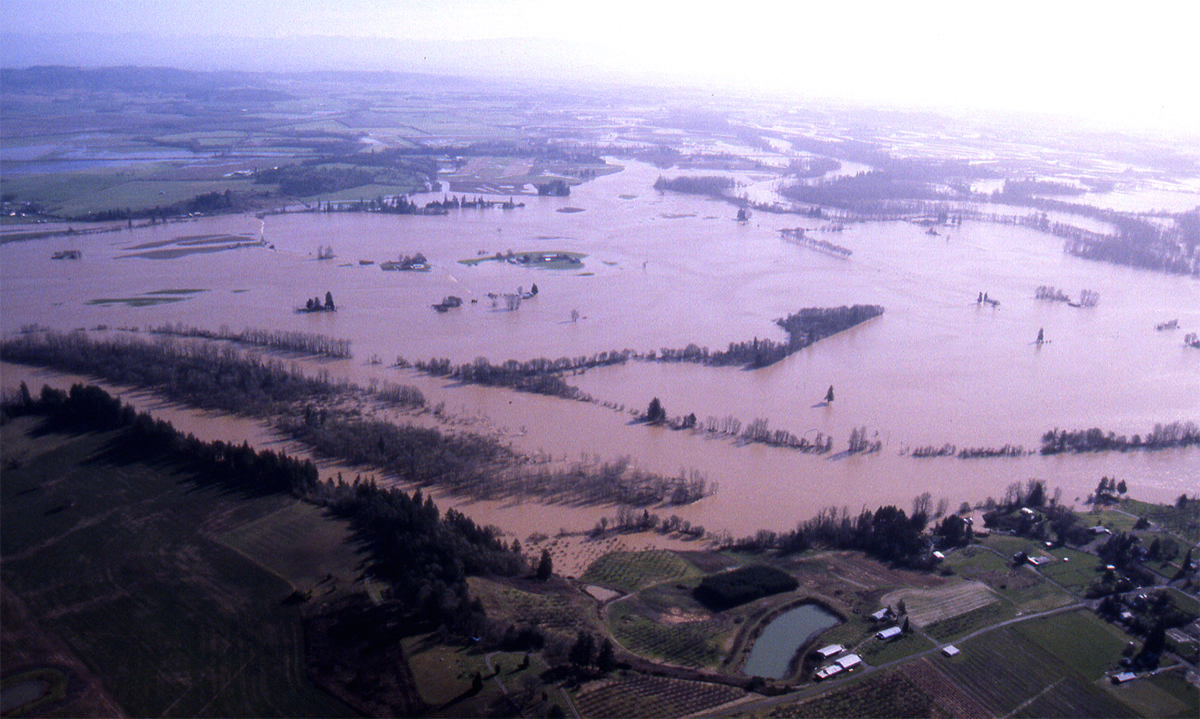
- Flooding in the Willamette Valley in 1996.
- Date: February 1996
- Location: Washington, Oregon, and Idaho in the United States
- Property damage: $700–$800 million ($1.4 billion in 2021)

The 1996 Pacific Northwest floods were a series of floods in Washington, Oregon, and the Idaho Panhandle in the United States. Large portions of the Columbia River and Puget Sound watersheds were impacted, including the Portland, Yakima, and the Palouse region. The flood was largely caused by warm temperatures and heavy rain falling on significant snowpack and caused an estimated $800 million in damage (1996 value).

== Meteorological synopsis ==
The winter of 1995–96 started with near to below average snowpack for much of the affected region with ski resorts opening later than usual. The weather pattern changed a few weeks later, producing significant snowfall in lowland areas. Moscow, Idaho recorded 42 inches (110 cm) of snow in ten days during the second half of January. Prolonged cold settled in following the heavy snow, causing the ground to freeze throughout much of the Columbia Basin and surrounding valleys. In places where the ground wasn't frozen, it was generally saturated with water.

In early February, a storm developed near Java and moved eastward. It was picked up by the jet stream and funneled toward the Pacific Northwest, reaching the region as a pineapple express, a name applied to atmospheric rivers observed on the U.S. and Canadian west coast that are sourced in the tropical or subtropical Pacific Ocean. La Niña conditions with a ridge of high pressure over the Rocky Mountains and an Aleutian Low helped to drive the moisture into Washington and Oregon rather than into California. The moisture reached Washington and Oregon on February 6 and on the 8th, Seattle observed its wettest February day with 3.06 inches (78 mm) of rain at the airport. With soils in many places either frozen or saturated, water resulting from rain falling on snowpack was unable to seep into the ground, instead remaining on the surface causing flooding.

== Flood and damage ==
Flooding on the Columbia River itself was largely mitigated by dams and other flood control measures taken after the 1948 Columbia River flood, though a few blocks in Vancouver were evacuated. Projects completed on a few smaller waterways in the 1960s were also successful in limiting flooding, such as the concrete channel dug for the Palouse River in Colfax, Washington after the Christmas flood of 1964. It is estimated that flood control infrastructure in the Willamette Valley prevented additional damage around $1.1 billion (1996 value) in Portland alone. Flooding was common elsewhere.

=== Western Washington and Oregon ===
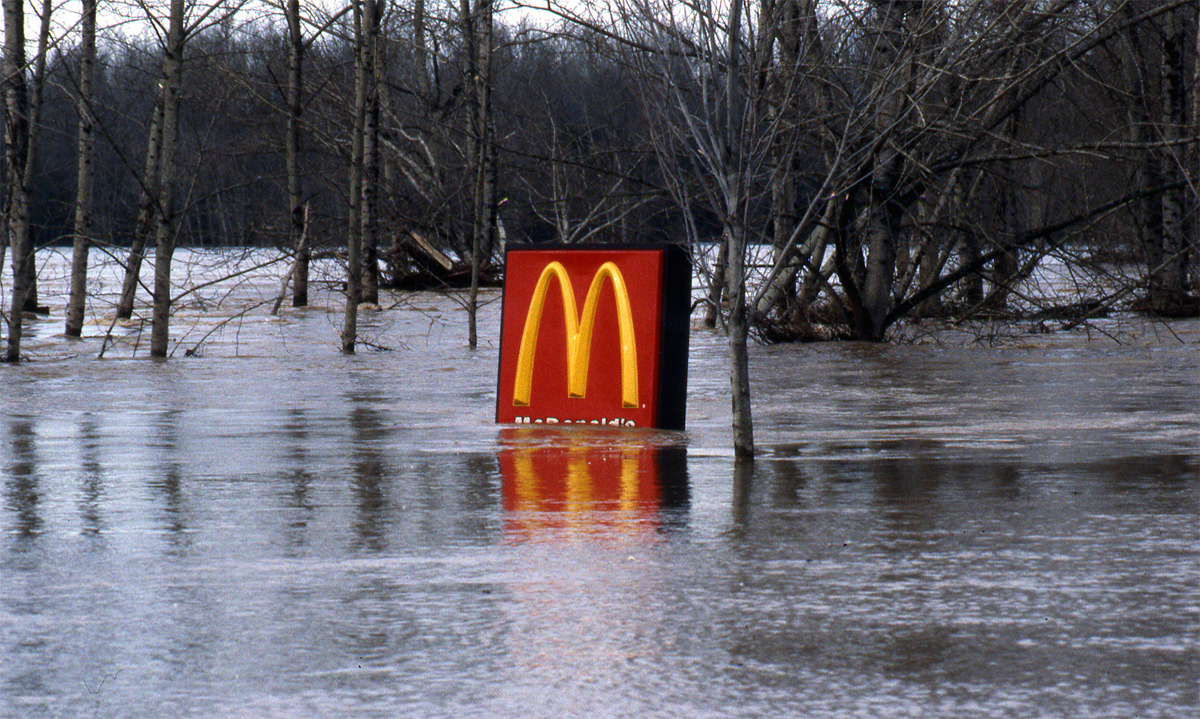
A McDonald's sign submerged in floodwater in Oregon

The Willamette River crested at 28.6 feet (8.7 m) in Portland on February 9, reaching major flood stage and causing some flooding issues in lowlying parts of the city, including the Northwest Industrial Area. Sandbags were placed along the downtown seawall to prevent flooding, but the river came a few inches short of overtopping the lowest sections. Further upstream, cities from Oregon City to Corvallis were impacted by rising waters on the Willamette River and Oregon Department of Agriculture was forced to temporarily relocate to a new facility in the Salem area. The water reached so high in Oregon City that Willamette Falls almost disappeared. Several rivers flowing west out of the Oregon Coast Range into the Pacific also flooded. The dairy industry in Tillamook County with 500 cattle having drowned and sediment left behind covering about a quarter of the grazing land in the county.

Southwest Washington saw significant impacts. Near Centralia and Chehalis, Interstate 5 was covered by up to 10 feet (3.0 m) of water and the dike built to protect the Chehalis-Centralia Airport overflowed. The Skookumchuck River reached a new record high discharge, with the Chehalis River and Cowlitz River also getting well above flood stage. Further south, a mudslide near Woodland also closed Interstate 5.

Numerous roads were washed out in King County. One man died when he drove into a 40 feet (12 m) deep hole left behind when the road he was driving on was destroyed. Parts of Kent and Renton flooded and a landslide caused a house in Tacoma to slide into the Tacoma Narrows. Because of its position between the Puget Sound and Lake Washington, Seattle did not experience significant flooding though the city was unable to draw water from the Cedar River because of the amount of sediment in the river.

=== Inland Northwest ===
About 11 inches (280 mm) of rain fell on the east side of Snoqualmie Pass in three days, causing the Yakima River to rise. Similar values were recorded near the headwaters of the Naches River, a tributary of the Yakima, with most communities from Nile in the Cascade Mountains to Toppenish taking damage. Visitors to a country club in Yakima were stranded when an ice jam blocked the river and cut off access, requiring military vehicles to be used in the evacuation. Interstate 82 near Granger was closed for flooding, and sediment entering the Naches River from one of its tributaries forced the closure of State Route 410.

Near Milton-Freewater to the south of Walla Walla, Mill Creek rose to the point where helicopters had to be used to evacuate people. Four levees in St. Maries, Idaho broke from high water and damage from ice. U.S. Route 95 and U.S. Route 12 were closed in Idaho. Tug boats had to be used on Lake Coeur d'Alene to keep a restaurant boat from floating away from its dock. The University of Idaho closed after some housing on campus was flooded by Paradise Creek.

== Response ==
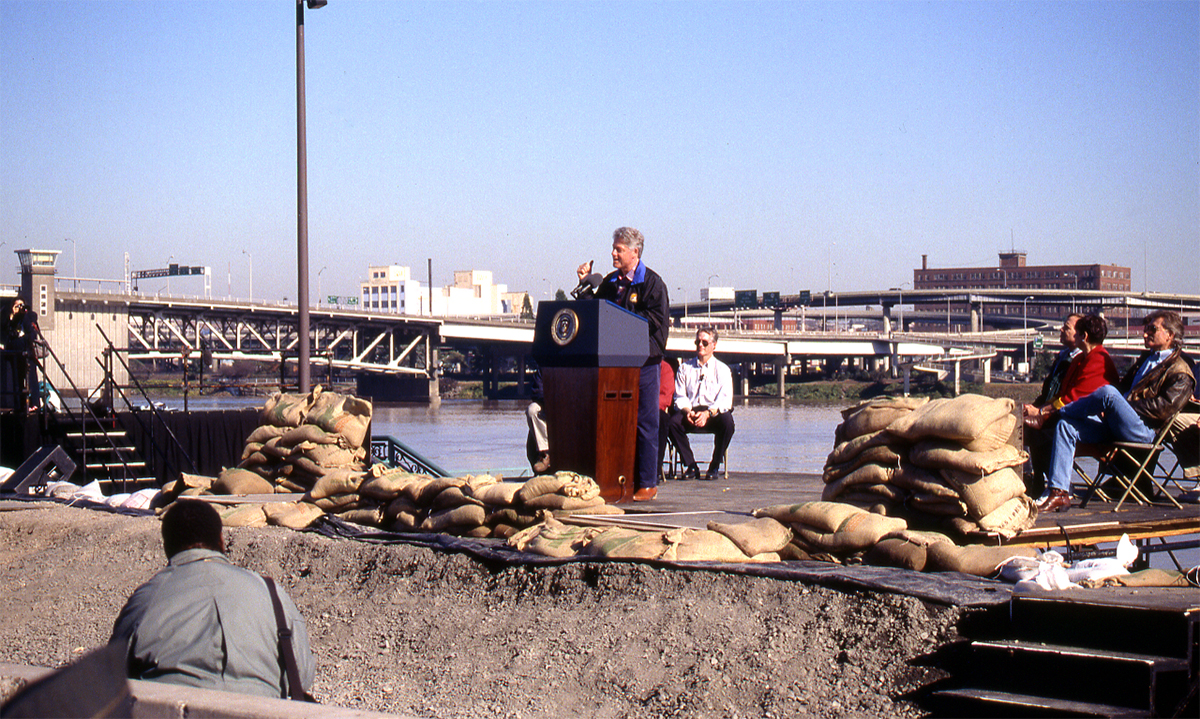
U.S. President Bill Clinton speaking in Portland, Oregon while touring flood damaged areas

The National Guard was deployed in each of the affected states to help with flood relief efforts. U.S. President Bill Clinton visited Boise, Idaho and the greater Portland area to tour flood damage and meet with both victims and local officials. He also issued a disaster declaration for parts of the Pacific Northwest. During the flooding, the U.S. Army Corps of Engineers used night-vision goggles to watch dikes.

Yakima County created a flood control district in 1998 to mitigate flood risk there. Among the projects was the removal of a scrapyard south of Union Gap to expand a bridge allowing for a wider floodplain. Previous to this, floodwaters would get backed up and rush into Wapato and Toppenish as occurred in 1996. Other agencies also made improvements to the Yakima River, including by widening the area between levees and constructing a new bridge for State Route 24, both near Yakima.

Environmental groups and scientists in Oregon lobbied for wetland and flood plain restoration along the Willamette River. Existing dams and other infrastructure provided examples of how far flood control in the region had come during the 20th Century, but it was not considered feasible to build more. The Army Corps of Engineers was directed by Congress to conduct a study of how successful such a program would be, which was still ongoing as recently as 2021.

== See also ==
- Great Flood of 1862
