= Stan Hedwall Park =

Park in Chehalis, Washington

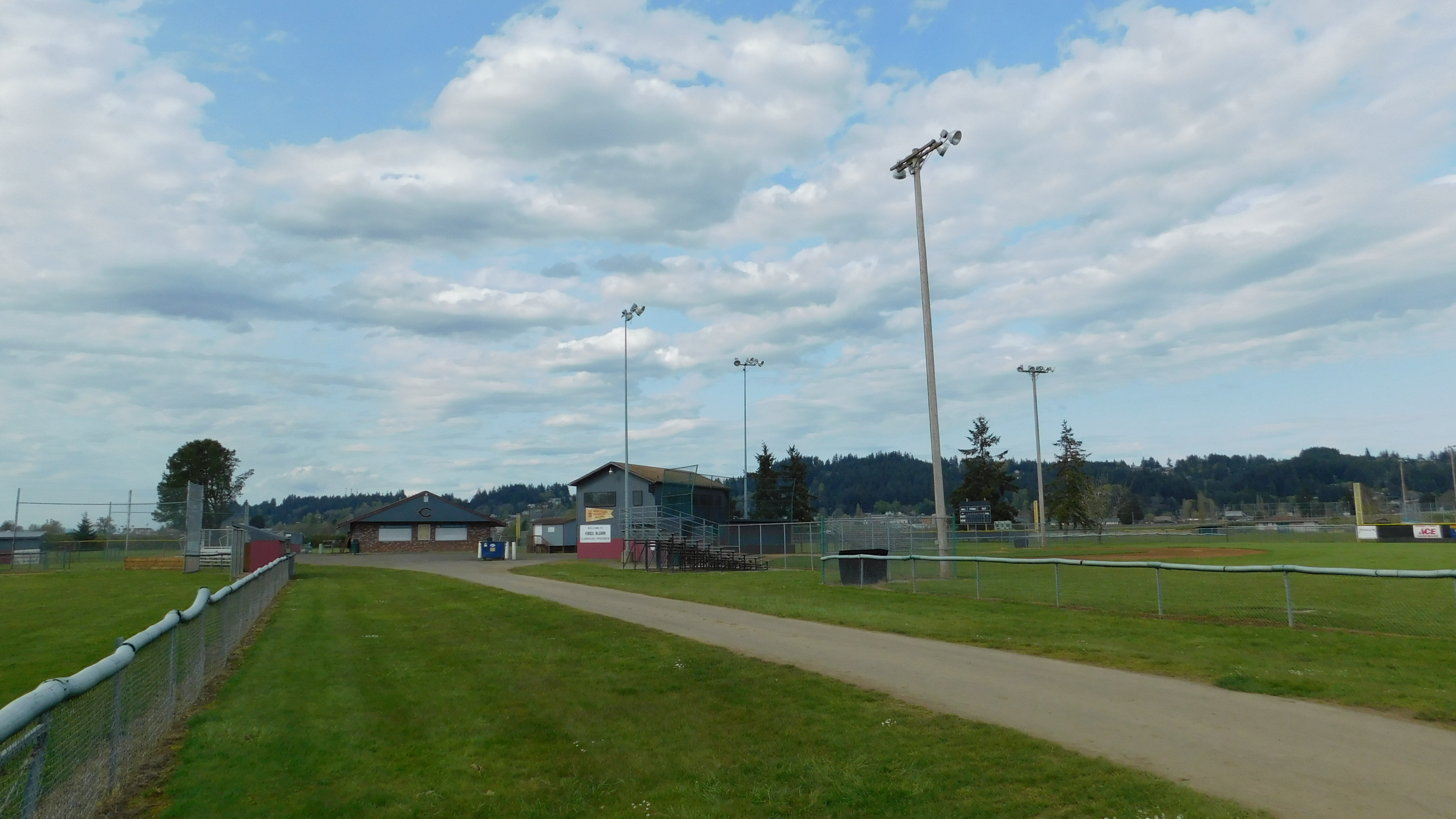
- Little League baseball fields at Stan Hedwall Park, 2022

- Location within Washington (state)
- Type: City park
- Location: Chehalis, Washington
- Coordinates: 46°38′24″N 122°57′54″W
- Area: 204 acres (83 ha)
- Created: 1972
- Opened: 1975
- Etymology: Stan Hedwall, Chehalis parks director
- Owner: City of Chehalis
- Status: Open; can be closed due to flooding
- Hiking trails: Gravel and compacted soil; 3 miles (4.8 km)
- Terrain: Flat, river bank
- Vegetation: Forested, meadow
- Threatened by: Flooding
- Parking: Multiple lots, 200+
- Facilities: RV parking and camping, bathrooms

Stan Hedwall Park is the largest park in Chehalis, Washington, at 204 acres (83 ha). The ballfields host competitions for the Babe Ruth League and various high school sports in Lewis County, acting as the home field for W.F. West High School.

Named after a Chehalis parks director, the recreation area was originally Washington state property that was used as a farm and overseen by residents of Green Hill School. The grounds were leased to the city in 1971 and a conversion of the site for use as a park was begun the following year. The park was considered mostly developed in 1975 and was officially opened. The acreage officially became city property in 2014 after the land was deemed as surplus by the state.

== History ==
The land was originally owned by Washington’s Department of Social and Health Services, making it state property. In 1970, the park was named after Stan Hedwall, a former Chehalis parks director and Lewis County commissioner. A 55-year agreement to lease the area to Chehalis was signed in 1971; the annual payment was $750. In 1972, the park began to be built in part from a grant by Washington's Interagency Committee for Outdoor Recreation. Prior to this, the grounds were used as farmland maintained by students at the Green Hill School, a juvenile detention center. Early attempts to clear the land were undertaken by Green Hill students in mid-1972 as a public relations tour to offset the ongoing negative impacts of escapes and runaway crimes.

The land was officially annexed by the city in September 1972. The parcel was originally listed at 170 acres (69 ha), (Note: The reported acreage for the land at its beginnings varies greatly, from 140 to 180 acres. See sourcing in section.) and construction, based on a two-year timetable at a cost of $467,000, began in late 1972. Early plans included lighted Babe Ruth ballfields, fields for softball and girls' league baseball, multi-use fields for other sports, multiple grandstands, a swimming area at the river, camping areas, hiking trails and bridges over the Newaukum, parking lots, concession stands, outdoor picnic facilities, playgrounds, and a 10-acre (4.0 ha) ornamental garden. The garden had small plots available for lease to residents and was known as the "pea patch" program.

The scope and funding were the largest of their type, as well as for a city the size of Chehalis, at the time. Despite help in constructing six ballfields from an engineering battalion of the Washington National Guard in 1973, the park struggled to meet its timeline by the summer of 1974, due to issues of a lack of resources and city help in finishing the ballfields. By mid-1974, light poles had been installed, and the concession stand was finished, and the fields were used for the 1974 Babe Ruth league state tournament. Stan Hedwall Park was considered fully open in 1975, notwithstanding concerns over a lack of funding and deletion of proposed amenities, and Chehalis residents were credited with raising $117,000 to help fund the completion of the park.

A major flood in December 1975 submerged 70% of the park with floodwater. The 100-year flood of 1996 also inundated the grounds, inducing damages to the park.

After various attempts to purchase the park, the city succeeded in January 2014 when an accommodation was made by the state to list the land as surplus and transfer, by deed, ownership to Chehalis for zero dollars.

As part of the United States Semiquincentennial in 2026, the park became the inaugural site of an annual city-led Fourth of July fireworks celebration in Chehalis. The 2026 event was also meant to push forward with the Stan Hedwall Master Plan, an effort to expand or improve the park's amenities, including upgraded sports fields and new playgrounds, as well as more trails and access to the forested areas of the grounds and the Newaukum River. The project also plans for a possible amphitheater and the reclamation of Scout Island located in the river. If funding and labor are successful, the timeline for completion is planned by 2040.

== Geography ==
Stan Hedwall Park is located west of I-5, and southeast of Lintott-Alexander Park and the beginning eastern trailhead for the Willapa Hills Trail.

== Sports and events ==
The park hosts a Babe Ruth League and is used for high school sports in the county, often as a home field for W.F. West High School, such as the school's track and field event, the Bearcat Invitational.

During the 1990s, Stan Hedwall Park was the starting point of a local bicycle race, known as the Klein Classic and has been a starting point, or waypoint, during the Lewis County Historical Bicycle Ride.

== Features ==
The park contains ball fields for softball and Little League baseball, areas for volleyball and soccer, playgrounds, RV parking, and three miles of trails. The Newaukum River winds through the forested, southern portion of the park, and the river is accessible to visitors for fishing and water activities.

== Environment and ecology ==
Spawning grounds for Chinook salmon, migrating up from the Chehalis River, are located on the Newaukum River near the park.

== See also ==
- Parks and Recreation in Chehalis, Washington
