= Flood history in Chehalis, Washington =

Reoccurring weather event in Washington, United States

Flooding in Chehalis, Washington
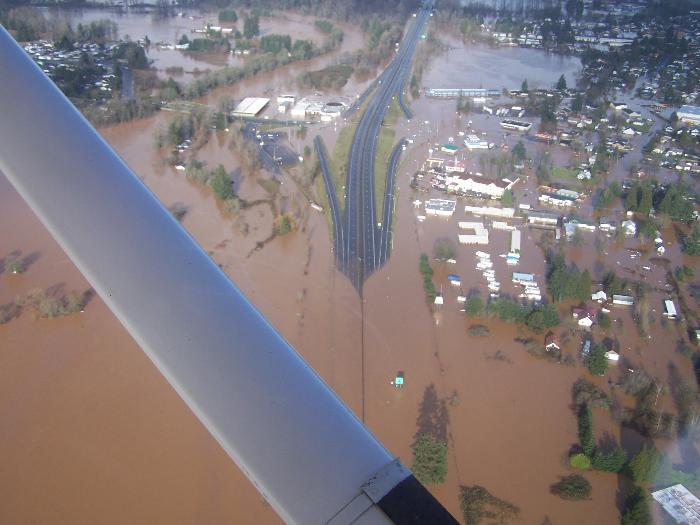
- Floodwaters over Interstate 5, Great Costal Gale of 2007
- Genre: Natural disaster
- Frequency: Multiple events per decade
- Location: Chehalis, Washington
- Coordinates: 46°39′36″N 122°57′48″W
- Most recent: December 2023; 2 years ago

The city of Chehalis is located in Washington state and rests upon the Chehalis River. Due to the city's location in the Chehalis Valley along with the nearby confluences of the Newaukum River south of Chehalis and the Skookumchuck River in neighboring Centralia, the community has suffered from numerous floods. Some floods have occurred resulting from overflows of creeks and minor tributaries in the Chehalis river basin, and severe cresting of the Cowlitz River has occasionally led to flooding in the Chehalis area.

The flood stage levels of the Chehalis, Newaukum, and Skookumchuck have fluctuated upwards historically, based on the height of dikes, levees, and floodplain surveys. Water inundation from heavy rains and excessive snowmelt has led to a considerable number of historic flooding events in the twin cities of Centralia and Chehalis.

Accounts of floods are traced as far back as early Native American settlement and since the beginnings of the city of Chehalis. Most floods occur between November and February, with only one minor event, in April 1991, occurring after March. (Note: An hour-long downpour of over 2 inches (51 mm) occurred on the evening of August 23, 1964, leading to standing water into the next morning at the fairgrounds and over several roads. Despite the state fair being interrupted, there were no reports of major damage and the watershed was unaffected.) The 20th century recorded over two dozen notable flooding events in and around the Chehalis community.

== Flood causes ==
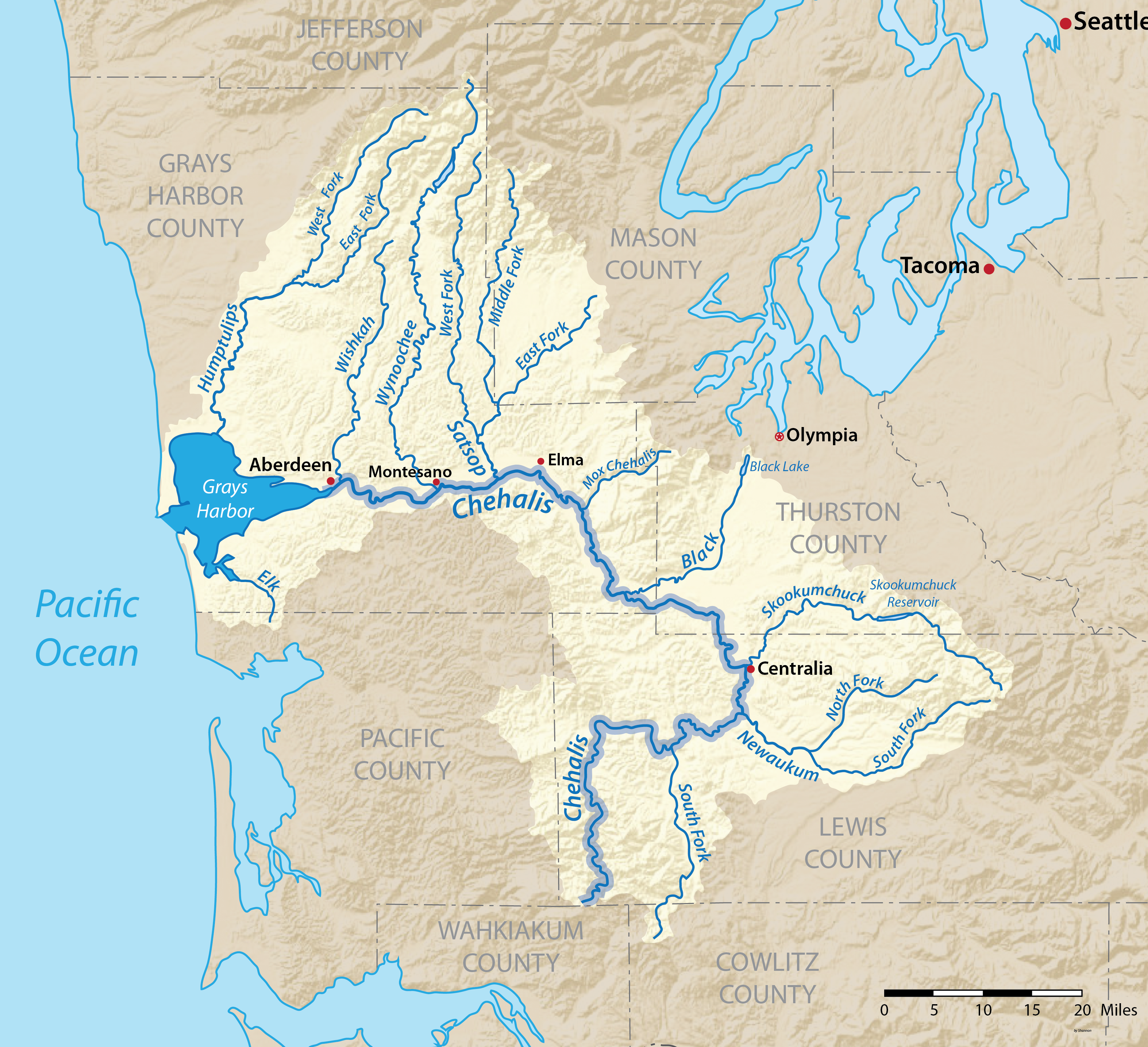
Watershed of the Chehalis River, including mountainous regions upstream of the city

Due to the flat topography of the Chehalis River watershed in the city, and a clay stratum under a thin layer of river soil, excess water is difficult to shed off the land or absorb into the ground. Successive floods can add 1 to 4 in (2.5 to 10.2 cm) of additional sediment, further limiting how much water can enter the ground in future floods. The rate of fall of the Chehalis River in the Twin Cities drops from a maximum 40 feet (12.2 m) per mile in the Willapa Hills down to approximately 3 feet (0.9 m) per mile.

As of 2024, the flood stage for the Chehalis is set at 65 feet (19.8 m), the Newaukum River at 10.5 feet (3.2 m), and the Skookumchuck's mark at 85 feet (25.9 m). A water flow between 38,800 to 75,099 cu ft (1,098.7 to 2,126.6 m^{3}) per second is a marker for a major flood event on the Chehalis compared to an average annual maximum of 20,000 cu ft (570 m^{3}) per second. Combined with the conjunction of the Skookumchuck and Newaukum rivers, the Chehalis Valley gathers floodwaters similar to a lake. Approximately 70% of the city limits of Chehalis is situated in the floodplain.

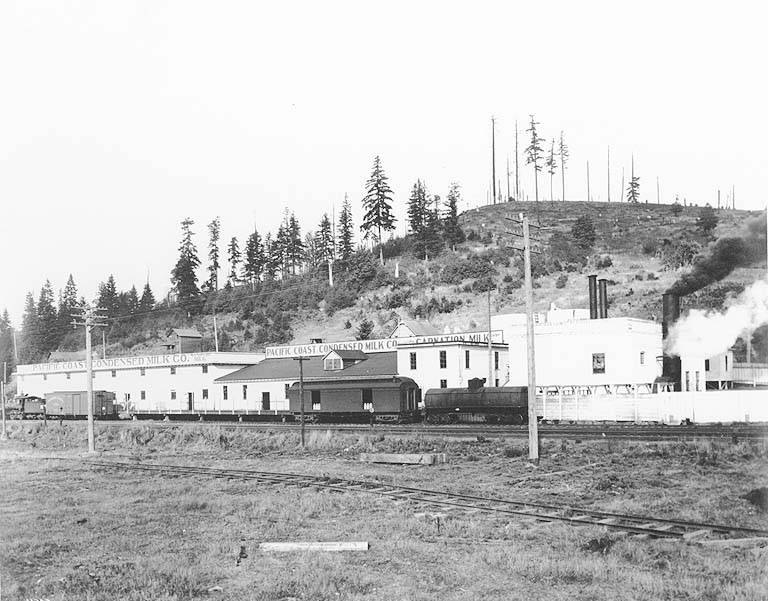
A clearcut hillside near Chehalis in 1908

Human activities, such as upstream logging in the Chehalis River basin, have caused floods to become more severe. Clearcut logging has resulted in numerous landslides containing logs, mud, and silt that lead to congested areas, log jams, and large amounts of debris in area waterways. An increase in floodplain development and the use of fill has also been cited as a major cause to the augmented intensity of floods in the late-20th and early-21st centuries. Local government and city officials have stated that due to the large footprint of the Chehalis floodplain, fill and development have little to no effect on the severity of floods.

The risk of flooding at a level that used to constitute a 100-year flood, meaning there was a 1% chance of it occurring in any year, had increased by 33% between the 1980s and 2010s. In addition to logging and development, climate change plays a role in increasing flood risk by delivering more precipitation to upstream areas. Estimations from a 2022 climate study group that included the Office of the Chehalis Basin and the University of Washington show the Chehalis River and the surrounding watershed can be expected to experience 14 major floods every century due to a warming climate, the expectations were more than doubled, reaching a rate of 45 floods per 100 years by the mid-to-late 21st century.

== Native American flood history ==
Historical accounts and spiritual lessons passed down through the history of Native American people living in and around the Chehalis River tell of major floods in the basin. Chronicles of the Cowlitz Indian Tribe speak of floods that reached the pinnacle of Mount St. Helens leading to the beginnings of the tribe. The Chehalis people have traditional stories of floods that led to the transformation of humans and animals and how they interacted between one another and their habitat.

== Flood events in the 19th century ==
One of the first non-Native visitors to the area, botanist David Douglas, recorded several floods and highwater troubles during an expedition in 1825. Early settlers in the 1850s reported consistent flooding between the Skookumchuck and the Saundersville settlement, eventually known as the city of Chehalis. The area was considered at times to be a 4-mile (6.4 km)-wide lake, and the site of the future fairgrounds was known as "Wet Prairie".

Local residents also reported high floodwaters occurring often during the 1860s, including in the winter of 1865. A floodwater occurrence that affected the city and the Chehalis Valley, known locally as the great flood of 1867, involved the overflow of the Cowlitz River. The first bridge constructed over the Chehalis River was washed away by a log jam during a flood in 1882; the passage was rebuilt the next year. A flood in December 1887 was stated to have been due in part to heavy rains after a dry summer. Two Chehalis residents died and some local areas were underwater by as much as 6 feet (1.8 m). River traffic, sawmill operations, and railroads were delayed.

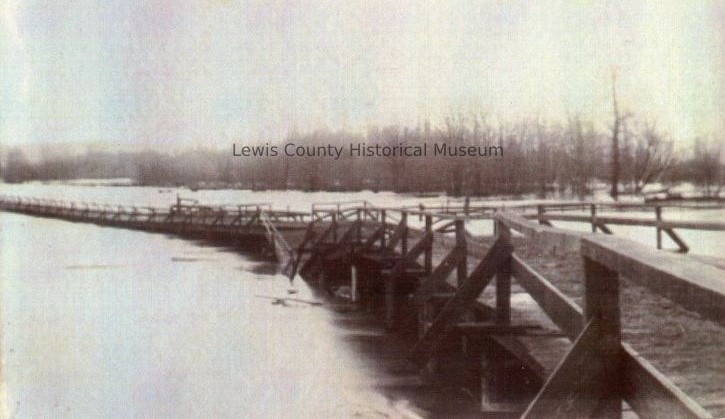
Floodwaters at Alexander Park, Chehalis, ca. 1890

Floods occurred in four consecutive years in the 1890s. Both the Chehalis and Newaukum rivers overflowed in mid-January 1895 as heavy rains combined with melting snow. The flood, 2 feet (0.6 m) higher than a flood the prior year, covered various rail lines. Several lower elevation areas of the city were underwater, forcing some evacuations. The event was considered the worst since 1867 though no major damage was reported. A smaller flood damaged a railroad track in November 1896. Two back-to-back minor floods occurred in December 1897, severely damaging nearby bridges, including a railroad bridge in Claquato. Between the Twin Cities, the pair of events washed out a plank road and covered the Northern Pacific rail line in 2 feet (0.6 m) of water. The second flood was caused by a combination of 14 inches (36 cm) of rain over a four-day period and melting snow.

== Flood events from 1900 to 1949 ==
=== 1900s ===
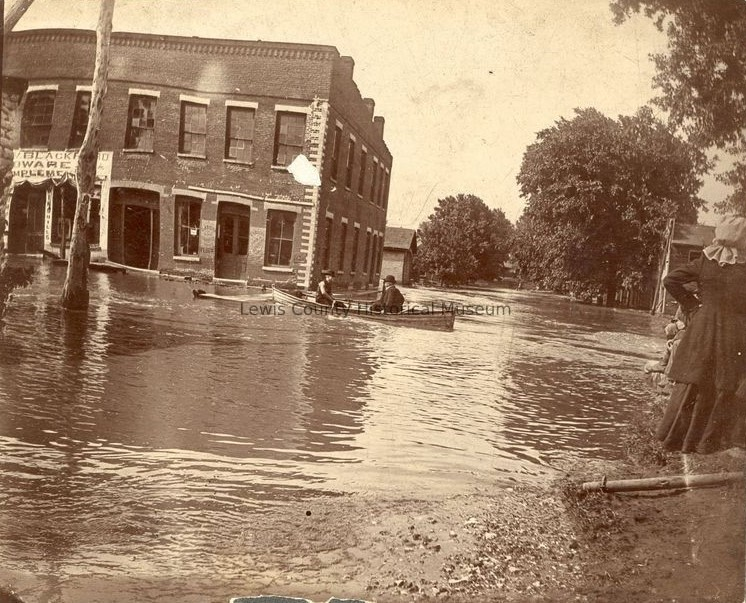
Floodwaters near the Burlington Northern Depot, Chehalis

The city was cut off and lost electricity during a flood in January 1903, caused by heavy rain and snowmelt; the flood mark was 4 inches (10 cm) below the 1897 events. A large episode of rising waters, given the name the Schoumacher Flood after a man who was stranded for three days, occurred in 1906 as the Cowlitz River affected the area, again cutting off the city. Mail and railroad service were suspended for days and the flood of the Cowlitz considered worse than the 1867 flood.

Factory areas and parts of the Pennsylvania Avenue-West Side Historic District suffered flooding in January 1909 after continuous rain and snowmelt caused the Chehalis to rise 19 feet (5.8 m) above its low water mark; residents could only move about by boat. A record-setting event followed that November and was due to the excess rise of the Chehalis and Newaukum rivers which led to landslides, the inundation of the Southwest Washington Fairgrounds, and caused significant economic losses to lumber milling in the city.

=== 1910s ===
A year later in November 1910 a flood similar to the 1909 event was significant enough to come close to breaking the new records. Again due to heavy rains and the overflow of both rivers, the waters also inundated the fairgrounds where the local rail tracks were covered and a small mudslide occurred. The event shut down gas service to the city for a small time. The fairgrounds were underwater during an overflow of nearby Coal and Salzer creeks in mid-January 1912. A minor flood in early January 1914, due to continuous rainfall, caused the outage of the Twin City Railroad between Centralia and Chehalis.

In December 1915, the city was hit by a flood from a storm reported by the Chehalis Bee-Nugget newspaper as the "Worst in City’s History". The Chehalis and Skookumchuck rivers overflowed and additional rain a few days later caused the banks of the Cowlitz River to be overwhelmed. Damages were reported as limited with no loss of life, but a backup of sewer lines affected parts of the city. The Twin City Railroad could not operate. Similar to other past floods, mills and factories were closed, rail lines were inoperable, and the fairgrounds were covered in water. A new road between the Twin Cities was covered in 2 feet (0.6 m) of water, mudslides were reported in the area, and electricity had to supplanted by the local steam plant as larger power operators in the region were forced to shut down.

Four years later, in January 1919, a deluge was declared by the Centralia Daily Chronicle as, "Present Flood Probably Worst in City’s History". The three major rivers in the area overflowed with landslides disconnecting travel, communities, and electricity in the area. The elementary and high school were briefly closed. The flood was mentioned in regional newspaper accounts to have broken the record for highest depth but gauges reported that the waters fell 18 inches (46 cm) short of the mark.

=== 1920 to 1949 ===
Except for a small inundation of lowland flooding occurring between late December 1920 and early January 1921, in which the Chehalis River came within two feet of the crest record, the city was spared any flooding events of note for twelve years. In December 1933, Chehalis was submerged in a month-long rain event, totaling over 22 inches (560 mm) of precipitation. The heavy rains affected most of Western Washington including roads between Portland and Tacoma and the submergence of the Pacific and Ocean Beach highways.

Passage between the Twin Cities was closed, and railroad traffic and postal services were disrupted in Chehalis. The city water supply was reduced due to damaged intakes and soil entering the reservoir. Alexander Park and the fairgrounds flooded, the latter of which had water levels up to the eaves in some buildings. Flood records were broken and damages were estimated to be as high as $50,000 in the county (2024 value of $1.3 million).

Successive events of heavy rainfall in early 1936, and excess rain mixed with snowstorms in February 1937, led to additional moderate flooding. A 1939 flood from a rain on snow event submerged the Chehalis–Centralia Airport.

A Cowlitz River overflow in 1946 affected the city. The weather pattern that caused the 1948 Columbia River flood was a widespread disaster throughout the region and both the Chehalis and Newaukum crested, leading to closures of roads and the airport. A 1949 rainfall event affected the city as the Cowlitz overflowed.

== Flood events from 1950 to 1999 ==
=== 1950s ===
Heavy rains in February and March 1951 caused moderate, local flooding. A flash flood in December 1953 clogged intakes of the local water system but the city's reservoir was ample enough that no shortage to residents occurred. Heavy rain showers continued into January 1954 causing lowland flooding with some inundation of the Ocean Beach and Pacific highways, the latter of which being a predecessor of Interstate 5. Gauges at the Chehalis River reached over 68 feet (20.7 m).

Two minor December 1955 inundations occurred due to a quick rise in the water of the Chehalis River. The second event was due to a combination of melting snow and near-record rain. The Chehalis River crested at 68.5 feet (20.9 m). A wind event, described as a "twister", hit the area the day after the river began to recede. Two minor floods, with the Chehalis and Skookumchuck rivers barely reaching or surpassing flood stage, occurred in November and December 1959. The November flood, with the Chehalis River reaching a foot over flood stage, did cause flooding in some neighborhoods.

=== 1960s ===
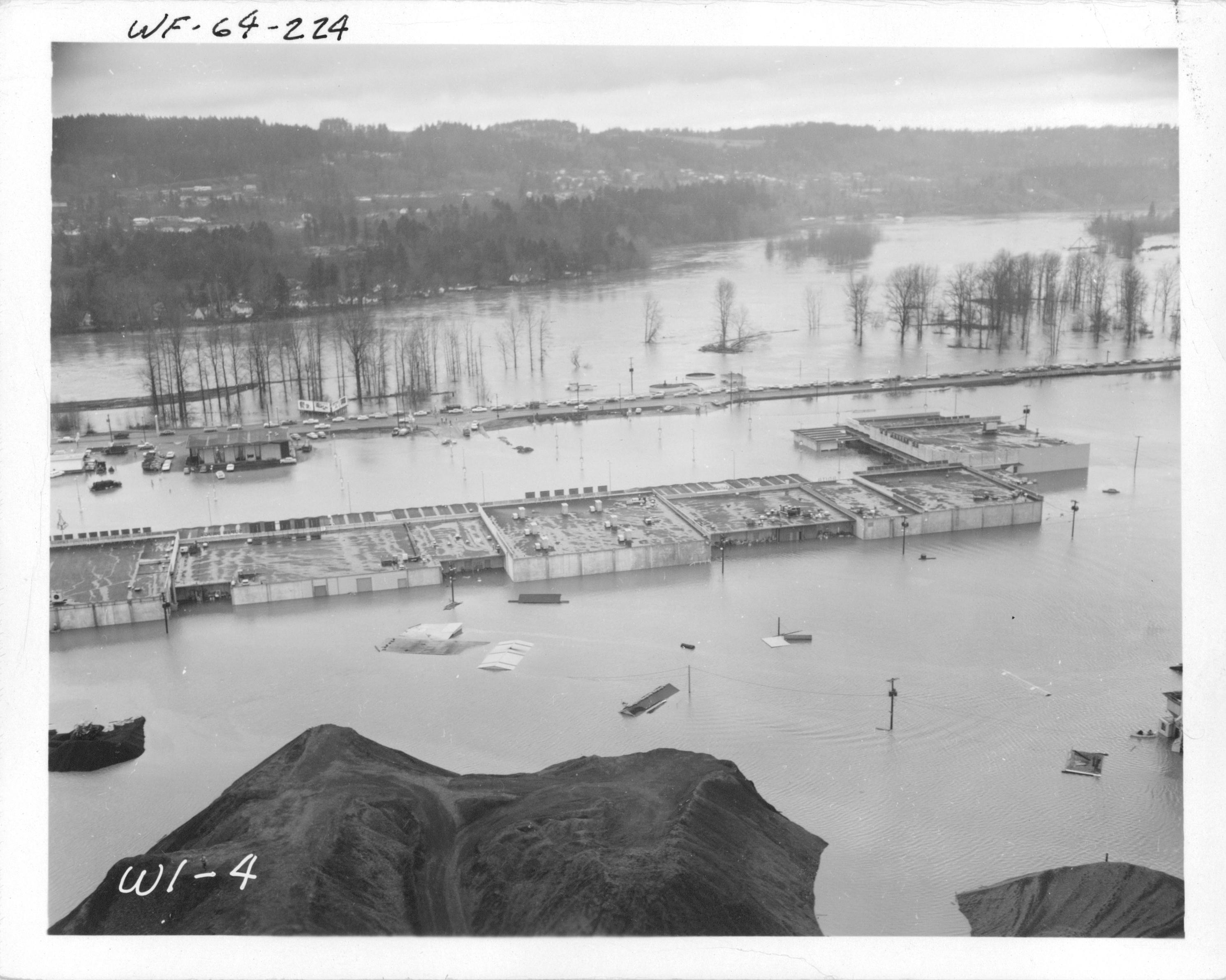
Valley flooding at an unidentified location during the 1964-65 Christmas flood

The highest flood levels in over a decade occurred in January 1964 with the Chehalis River overflowing 3.5 feet (1.1 m) above flood stage. Due to excessive rainfall over a two-day period, flooding was considered moderate with water covering local neighborhood streets, Alexander Park. A few businesses were unable to operate.

Later in the year as part of the Christmas flood of 1964, a mixture of heavy snow and rain led to an approximate 1.8 feet (0.5 m) rise over flood stage of the Chehalis River, and the Skookumchuck registering just under flood stage of 68 feet (20.7 m). Lowland areas and some roads were submerged. A state disaster declaration was authorized but the county rejected any funding, considering the aid too quick and unnecessary; federal aid was still available. The Pacific Northwest event, described by the United States Geological Survey (USGS) as one of the 20th century's worst flood disasters, was ushered in by a weather pattern that dropped 6 in (150 mm) of rain during the course of a week in the city. Continuing heavy precipitation followed into January 1965, leading to minor flooding.

=== 1970s ===
A minor cresting of the Chehalis in December 1970, due to a mix of snow and rain, produced local but moderate flooding.

In January 1971, repeated heavy rainfall, along with snowmelt, began to overwhelm the city and the river basins. A minor overflow of the Chehalis in mid-January caused few issues but access to the airport was closed and a small mudslide shut down a portion of the main thoroughfare to Centralia. Over a week later, more rains caused the Chehalis to crest producing flooding in local neighborhoods and another mudslide on the Kresky-National road between the Twin Cities. The 1971 flood incident was asserted to be the worst since 1937.

Residents were evacuated as the west side of the city flooded. The Chehalis River reached 6.5 feet (2.0 m) above flood stage and the Skookumchuck crested just over its flood stage. The Chehalis peaked at 70.2 feet (21.4 m) and early estimated losses in the county exceeded $500,000. The Red Cross immediately declared the Twin Cities a disaster area and over 9,000 sandbags were imported; approximately 5,000 sandbags were used in Chehalis. There was no loss of life, but there was a larger than normal number of evacuations, though only minor calls for housing assistance. Over 4 in (10 cm) of water intrusion were recorded at the local Yard Birds Shopping Center. The region received aid via disaster declarations at the county, state, and federal levels.

A major flood occurred in January 1972, becoming the first flood to submerge the newly built Interstate 5. The event started in the middle of the month with the Chehalis reaching 1 foot (0.30 metres) over its banks, leading to some roads in the city to be covered. Continuing rainfall over the next week led to the Chehalis to overflow its banks again, and the United States Army Corps of Engineers (USACE) was mobilized in advance due to concerns over severe flooding. Almost 5 in (130 mm) of rain fell over several days leading the Chehalis River to rise 15 feet (4.6 m) in two days while setting a flood stage record of 71.6 feet (21.8 m).

While no deaths were reported, schools were closed, dozens of people, including a squirrel, were evacuated from the city and the Yard Birds Mall was under two feet of water, recording $500,000 in losses. The Ocean Beach Highway was closed for a time, the main arterial to Centralia was covered by as much as 16 feet (4.9 m) of water, and about 200 feet (61.0 m) of Burlington Northern rail line between the Twin Cities was washed away. Combined damages in Centralia and Chehalis was assessed at approximately $1.0 million. The fairgrounds suffered damages estimated at $250,000 after a levee built in 1952 failed. A severe snowstorm followed days later, and flood disaster declarations were announced at the city, county, state, and federal levels; official costs were determined to be nominally $400,000.

Two years later, a cresting of the Chehalis River, twice in January 1974, caused $10 million in losses in the region after a period of heavy rain. The river reached 69.1 feet (21.1 m) and similar to other floods, roads, rail lines, and schools were closed for a few days. The airport and the fairgrounds, protected by dikes after the 1972 event, were left unharmed despite some reports of seepage.

Another heavy rain event, measuring 5.71 in (145 mm) at Centralia in one week, led to the quick overflow of rivers in the area in December 1975, including the Cowlitz. The Chehalis officially reached 71.17 feet (21.7 m) and the Skookumchuck struck just above flood stage. The dike at the fairgrounds suffered a minor leak but was repaired with help from students from Green Hill School and the venue was spared from major losses due to new pumps that were installed after the 1972 flood.

Heavy damages occurred at the Stan Hedwall and Alexander parks after they were submerged. Roads in Chehalis were closed and evacuations were required for areas of the city. An apartment complex was evacuated by boat but there was no loss of life. A state emergency declaration was announced two days after the flood began and federal relief arrived via the Small Business Administration two weeks later.

A heavy rain storm in December 1977, which largely impacted Eastern Lewis County upstream of Chehalis, caused the Chehalis River to reach a high of 5.76 feet (1.8 m) over flood stage. The main artery between Chehalis and Centralia, Kresky Avenue which had been rebuilt in recent years, was again flooded over and closed despite additional attempts to control flooding by the widening of Salzer Creek, which courses through the area.

=== 1980s ===
The Chehalis River slightly exceeded flood stage in February 1981. Due to a heatwave that brought severe weather nationwide, a large rainstorm led to mountain runoff but no major flooding was reported in the area. A similar event with minor cresting occurred almost exactly a year later.

A major flood disaster developed in November 1986. Caused by a weather event considered at the time to be a "once-a-century" occurrence, it brought 6 to 8 in (150 to 200 mm) of rainfall over several days. The city saw damage to two schools and a total of 10 feet (3.0 m) of water at the fairgrounds after a levee was breached. All but one lane of the interstate was closed through city limits. The city declared a disaster and a ballfield at W.F. West High School was used as an emergency helipad.

The flood led to a contamination cleanup at a closed industrial site, known as American Crossarm and Conduit, near Millett Field. The inundation caused a spillage of approximately 10,000 US gallons (38,000 L; 8,300 imp gal) (Note: Early reports in the aftermath of the November 1986 flood listed the chemical spill as 3,000 pounds (1,400 kg).) of a mixture of creosote, diesel fuel, and chemicals used in the treatment of lumber which spread into the surrounding neighborhoods as well as the Dillenbaugh Creek watershed. Cancer-causing compounds such as dioxins and pentachlorophenol were included in the spill. The remediation was undertaken by the Environmental Protection Agency (EPA) and was listed in 1988 as a federal superfund site. The $9.5 million hazardous cleanup project was not completed until 1996.

=== 1990s ===
Interstate 5 was covered with floodwaters again during a major flood disaster in January 1990. Heavy rains, including 4.5 inches (110 mm) in one day, coupled with a dike breach on the Skookumchuck, led to severe damages at the fairgrounds and the airport. At-capacity reservoirs in the city overflowed and both the Skookumchuck, at 87.11 feet (26.6 m), and the Chehalis, at 73.39 feet (22.4 m), broke flood stage records. The Yard Birds Mall reported up to 24 inches (61 cm) of water and over $1.0 million in losses. I-5 was closed for a day as it was submerged at one point by 7 feet (2.1 m) of floodwaters. A USACE report the following year recognized the event as a 100-year flood, the first in the city's history.

A following flood due to a Western Washington weather event in November of that year led to lowland flooding in the community. Led by extreme record rainfall, the Chehalis reached 71.43 feet (21.8 m). A smaller flood occurred in April 1991, the only flooding event ever recorded later than March in Chehalis and the surrounding area.

Minor cresting of the Chehalis River occurred twice in late December 1994 after above-average rainfall. Nearly a week apart, the flood stage reached above 1 foot (0.3 m) and 2 feet (0.6 m) respectively and a few roads were slightly submerged. Other than costs for cleanup, no major damages were reported and the flooding was considered a "nuisance" by the Lewis County Public Services Department.

A small overflow of the Chehalis, reaching 3 feet (0.9 m) above flood stage, occurred in early January 1997, creating an influx of waters in low-lying areas, specifically around Washington State Route 6 (SR 6). The Scout Lodge was used as a temporary Red Cross shelter. Owing to repeated inundations to the lands, the city attempted in the weeks after the 1997 event to buy out homes in the flood-prone area.

Multiple heavy rainfall events during the 1998-1999 winter season began in late November as roads in the city were reported to be pouring with water; minor evacuations were necessary. In December, several roads were under a minor amount of water in the city but no waterways reached flood levels. A similar event transpired in late January 1999. Only the Chehalis River exceeded flood stage, by just 0.5 feet (0.2 m).

==== 100-year flood of 1996 ====
100-year flood of 1996
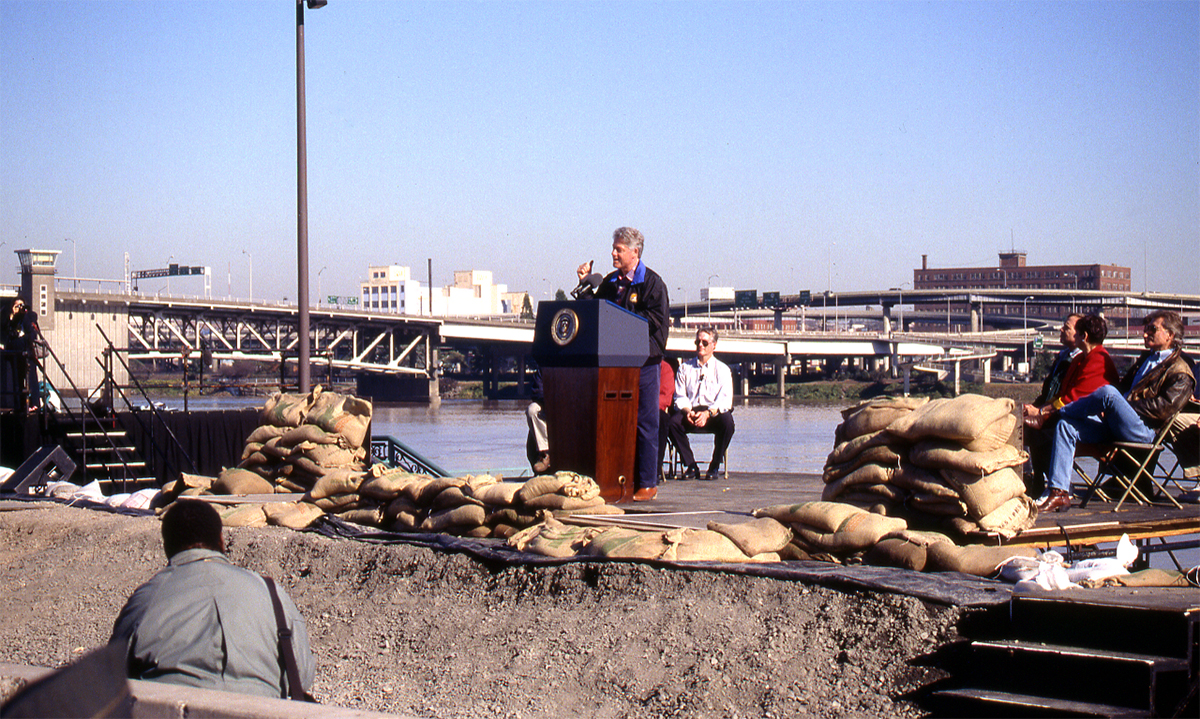
- U.S. President Bill Clinton speaks in nearby Portland, Oregon during a tour of regions impacted by the 1996 floods.
- Location: Chehalis and other communities in the Chehalis Valley
- Deaths: 0
- Property damage: $2 million

A 100-year flood, part of the larger 1996 Pacific Northwest floods, with the Chehalis River carrying 49,000 cubic feet of water per second, transpired in February 1996. Setting crest and flood stage records, the Chehalis, at 74.3 feet (22.6 m), the Cowlitz River, over 6 feet (1.8 m) above flood stage at 24.2 feet (7.4 m), and the Skookumchuck, at 87.3 feet (26.6 m), overflowed after 4 inches (100 mm) of rain in one day. It was the first chronicled situation in which all three major rivers in the valley exceeded their historical flood stage levels in one event. The level of water inundation surpassed that as listed on 100-year floodplain maps.

A state of emergency was immediately declared and I-5 was closed for 4 days after it was covered in 6 feet (1.8 m) of floodwater; further measurements listed the amount of flooding there to be 10 feet (3.0 m). The Red Cross operated a command station in the downtown district and, due to a large number of requests, had to limit the amount of services to 100 people per day. Radio broadcasts of emergency information to the city were limited to one station, KITI-FM, after waters forced the closure of an AM broadcaster.

Resembling prior floods, the airport was severely flooded, parts of the Chehalis Industrial Park were submerged, the Chehalis Apartments and surrounding neighborhood were underwater, and Kresky Avenue was closed for several days due to standing water and a mudslide. Other roads in the area were closed as well, and there were multiple school and business closures. Evacuations were voluntary and both the R.E. Bennet Elementary School and the Lewis County Jail were used as temporary shelters. The fairgrounds had some standing water at the beginning of the deluge but the pumps, which were forcing out 24,000 US gallons (91,000 L; 20,000 imp gal) per minute, became overwhelmed when a dike broke. The waters reached 18 inches (46 cm) higher on the grounds than the 1990 flood.

The flood event led to city ordinances directing that existing homes in the Chehalis floodplain be raised 12 inches. Several hundred homes reported significant damages. A year after the event, damages to the Chehalis sewage treatment plant, which included cracked storage basins, unstable soil, and a destroyed pump, were estimated to reach as high as $1.5 million. The city was able to buyout and relocate 27 of 31 homeowners in the neighborhood near the sewage plant, a long-standing flood prone area.

== Flood events in the 21st century ==
=== 2000s ===
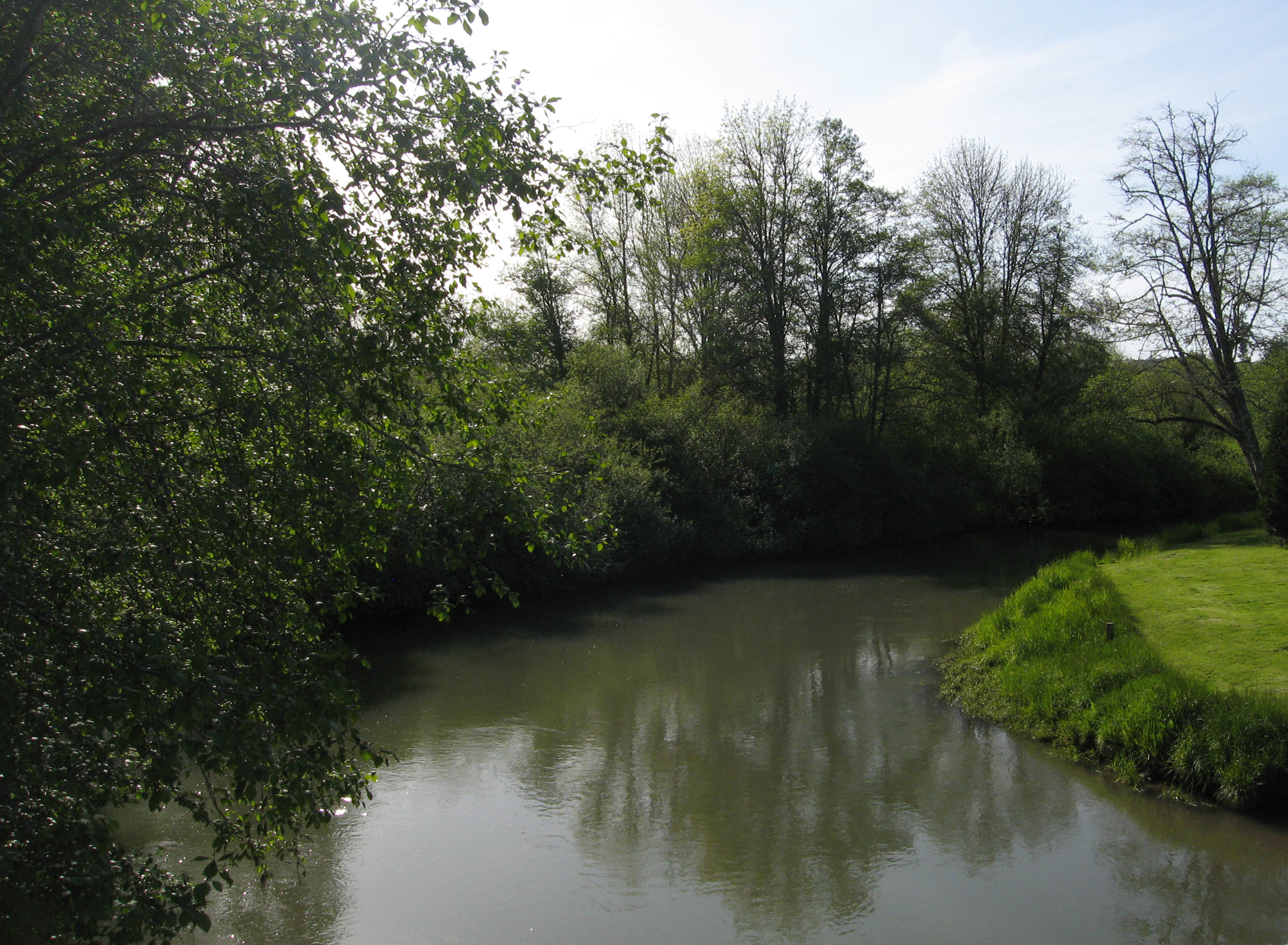
The Skookumchuck River at Bucoda upstream of Chehalis

The early events of the 21st century marked the beginning of 18 recognized floods in twenty years on the Chehalis River.

Minor flooding was reported in mid-December 2001 due to continuous, rainy weather over several days. Several roads and low elevation areas, such as the Chehalis Apartments near Millet Field, were underwater. The Chehalis crested at 69 feet (21.0 m). A comparable rainfall and flood event occurred in January 2003 where record precipitation struck Lewis County. Both the Chehalis and Skookumchuck reached minimum flood stage. Another analogous weather pattern, a Pineapple Express, occurred two years later in 2005, once again causing the minor submergence of several roads. Three of the four local river systems, the Cowlitz, Newaukum, and Skookumchuck, reached or exceeded their flood limits.

The following January 2006, Chehalis experienced three heavy rainfall patterns in the month. The first led to a small flood that engulfed the airport and surrounding lowlands. Caused by a stretch of 20 consecutive days of measurable rain, both the Newaukum and Skookumchuck moderately crested over their limits, and the Chehalis was 1 foot (0.30 metres) above its banks. Roads, low areas, and farmlands were moderately submerged.

The depth of the waters was enough to crack a 500,000-US-gallon (1,900,000 L; 420,000 imp gal) concrete holding tank at the city's wastewater treatment plant. The tank was considered mostly empty and sewage ran off into a nearby slough not affecting the city's water supply. Days later, the Chehalis and Skookumchuck rose to flood levels after more rainfall hit the area. At the end of the month, a downpour of 2 inches (51 mm) during a single evening led to an immediate flood warning by the National Weather Service (NWS). The Newaukum crested 2 feet (0.6 m) above flood stage, and both the Chehalis and Skookumchuck were declared as being below Phase II flood levels. Low-lying residential areas and roads in the city were again underwater, necessitating some evacuations.

An equivalent flood event that inundated the airport occurred in November 2006. Lewis County was part of a statewide emergency declaration and the city of Chehalis declared its own during the three-day storm that produced almost 7 inches (18 cm) of rain. Minor-to-moderate road and lowland flooding developed, specifically around the Millet Field and Chehalis Apartment neighborhoods. A few evacuations were required and fallen trees damaged a water main.

==== December 2007 Flood ====
December 2007 Flood
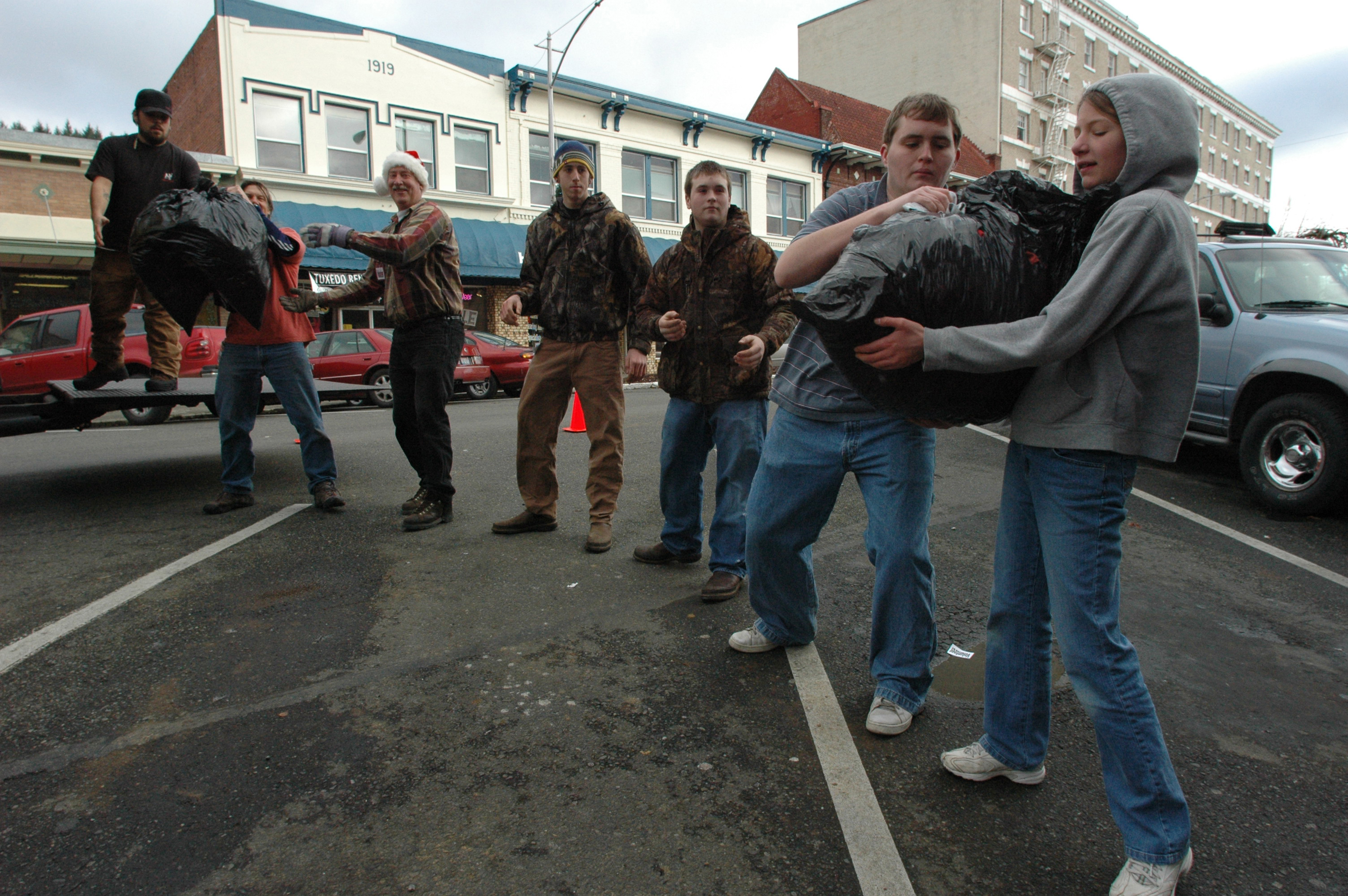
- Volunteers distribute goods in Chehalis during 2007 flood
- Date: December 2007
- Location: Chehalis and other communities in the Chehalis Valley
- Deaths: 0
- Property damage: $930 million

A record flood in early December 2007 closed I-5 in the city for several days as the highway was covered in 10 feet (3.0 m) of water. Breaking the crest record set in 1996, the Chehalis River set a flood stage mark of 74.78 feet (22.8 m). The river exceeded the threshold for a flood event to be considered catastrophic, listed as 75,100 cubic feet of water per second (cfs), and an average flow rate of 70,000 cfs was recorded at a monitor station north of the city in Grand Mound during the unfolding disaster. A total of approximately 300,000 acre feet of water was recorded as flowing through the Chehalis River during the event.

Numerous areas in the city were impassable and the local shopping district was submerged. Neighborhoods with no recorded history of intruding floodwaters were heavily inundated. Over 500 people in the area were evacuated including over 100 people by helicopter under the United States Coast Guard. (Note: The Coast Guard units that rescued people in Chehalis by helicopter during the December 2007 flood were honored the following month by the Seattle Seahawks during a pre-game ceremony of a National Football League playoff contest. The Seahawks won, 35-14.) Within two days the Chehalis fire department had recorded the rescue of 80 people. Chehalis residents in flooded areas relied on a variety of watercraft for transport. Railroad freight, as well as Amtrak services, were halted.

Despite local opposition, a dike at the airport near the interstate was intentionally breached by the Washington State Department of Transportation (WSDOT) the day after the rivers crested. The purpose for the opening in the levee was to protect and open the highway, a concern of the governor at the time. Other concerns were due to excessive floodwaters at the airport and the Twin City Town Center.

The highway was reopened, only for commercial traffic, after an approximate 4 day closure. The freeway was fully open to private passenger vehicles the next day though speed limits were reduced. The airport reopened in a week and it was recorded that the airfield was underwater by as much 8 feet (2.4 m) with 2 inches (5.1 cm) of silt and mud covering the runway.

Within a week, Lewis County was granted aid under state and federal emergency declarations, with parts of the aid operation overseen by the Federal Emergency Management Agency (FEMA), which provided food and emergency services; FEMA later expanded the aid to include cleanup and repairs regarding infrastructure. The financial aid included loans to businesses, farmers, and residents for repairs to their property or to help offset economic losses incurred. Lewis County was specifically granted cash grants up to $28,800 for residents to pay for immediate necessities or repairs. The governor, Christine Gregoire, along with senators Maria Cantwell and Patty Murray and other federal representatives, toured the city.

The event was due in part to the Great Coastal Gale of 2007, which produced 22 in (560 mm) of rainfall in the Upper Chehalis Basin. Rainfall and snowmelt in the Willapa Hills accounted for the most severe flow of waters on the Chehalis during the flood. The severity of the disaster was also connected to global warming and a combination of poor floodplain development and logging practices. In opposition, local officials stated that developers in the city are mandated to exceed the requirements to build in a flood-prone area.

The total cost of damages was estimated by a state commission to be $930 million and 100 homes in the region were demolished. Between the Twin Cities, 220 business suffered damages, which included a combined loss of $6.8 million to the local landmark shopping centers, Sunbirds and Yard Birds Mall. Due to the closure of the highway, approximately $4 million of daily economic losses to the state were estimated and repairs to the freeway in Chehalis were assessed to cost several hundred thousand dollars.

Two months after the record flood of 2007, the USGS determined the disaster to likely be classified as a 500-year flood.

==== Flood of 2009 ====
Another major flood materialized in January 2009, with the Chehalis River reaching a high of 72.5 feet (22.1 m) and the Newaukum cresting at approximately 2.5 feet (0.8 m) over its flood stage. The event was based on heavy rain and a warm weather event that led to sudden snowmelt. Several regions within Chehalis were immersed and rail lines were shut down, as well as 20 miles (32 km) of the interstate, which was covered by as much as 3 feet (0.9 m) of water. Lowlands around the Dillenbaugh Creek watershed were underwater and residential roads near the Government and Pennsylvania-Westside districts experienced some minor submergence. The fairgrounds and airport levees held and little damage was reported at the Twin Cities Town Center.

Governor Gregoire visited the city a few days after the waters receded. The city council declared a local state of emergency days after the event as a step to be eligible for federal relief funds. Initially, despite a combined loss of over $9 million in business and residential damages, state and federal emergency declarations were not announced; two interconnecting federal emergency declarations were declared at the end of the month and in March, allowing funding and assistance provided via FEMA to proceed.

Similar to the 2007 event, reiterated concerns were brought up regarding the increase in flooding in the valley, specifically the logging practice of clearcutting and the conversion of floodplains for development.

=== 2010s ===
A less severe flood transpired during record daily rainfall in December 2010, and 17 in (430 mm) of precipitation led to another flood in November 2012. Heavy rain led to only a moderate flood event in December 2015 that submerged several homes and businesses in the area. Several residents had to be evacuated. The rainfall was expected to be significantly worse and severe warnings were sent out to the public. However, the Chehalis and Newaukum rivers reached just above their flood stages as the anticipated precipitation did not unfold.

=== 2020s ===
A stretch of I-5 between Chehalis and Centralia was closed for several hours after a major flood in January 2022. The closure was a measure of precaution. The highway was never flooded but several exits and on-ramps were partially submerged. The flood was created by excessive snowmelt and heavy rainfall, leading to a retroactive emergency proclamation from the state governor. The Newaukum River broke its crest record set in 1996 and floodwaters reached as far into the city as the Lewis County Courthouse. Five miles of railroad track used by the Chehalis-Centralia Railroad and Museum were washed out. The severity of the flood led to the Red Cross opening a shelter at the fairgrounds and the deployment of the Washington National Guard to help with sandbag operations. Several weeks after the 2022 flood, over 100 structures of various homes and businesses within the Chehalis River Basin had reported damage, with an estimated financial loss of over $2 million.

Chehalis underwent minor water inundation from excessive precipitation during the 2023 Pacific Northwest floods event. Homes and businesses located near W.F. West High School experienced approximately 1 foot (0.30 metres) of flood depth, and the accumulation was due in part to an unnamed creek in the area unable to handle the additional flow of water. The extreme rainfall was caused by an atmospheric river and led to flood warnings of the Newaukum River.

Beginning on December 8, 2025, a record-breaking atmospheric river hit the Pacific Northwest and caused the 2025 Pacific Northwest floods. Minor flooding occurred in parts of the city with the Chehalis River peaking just below flood stage. The school day at Chehalis Middle School was delayed due to the facility's parking lot being inundated. Flooding at usual locations occurred, including water deep enough to close Kresky Avenue at the Centralia-Chehalis border and at the Chehalis Apartments complex, where some residents were evacuated. A nearby gospel mission, temporarily open to provide assistance, was forced to close when water began to enter the building. A double crest of the Newaukum River, reaching just under its record high at 205.36 feet (62.6 m) on December 9, was followed by a peak of just over a 205 feet (62.5 m) the next afternoon. The high waters led to lowland flooding between Chehalis and the community of Newaukum.

== History of flood mitigation ==
=== 20th century ===
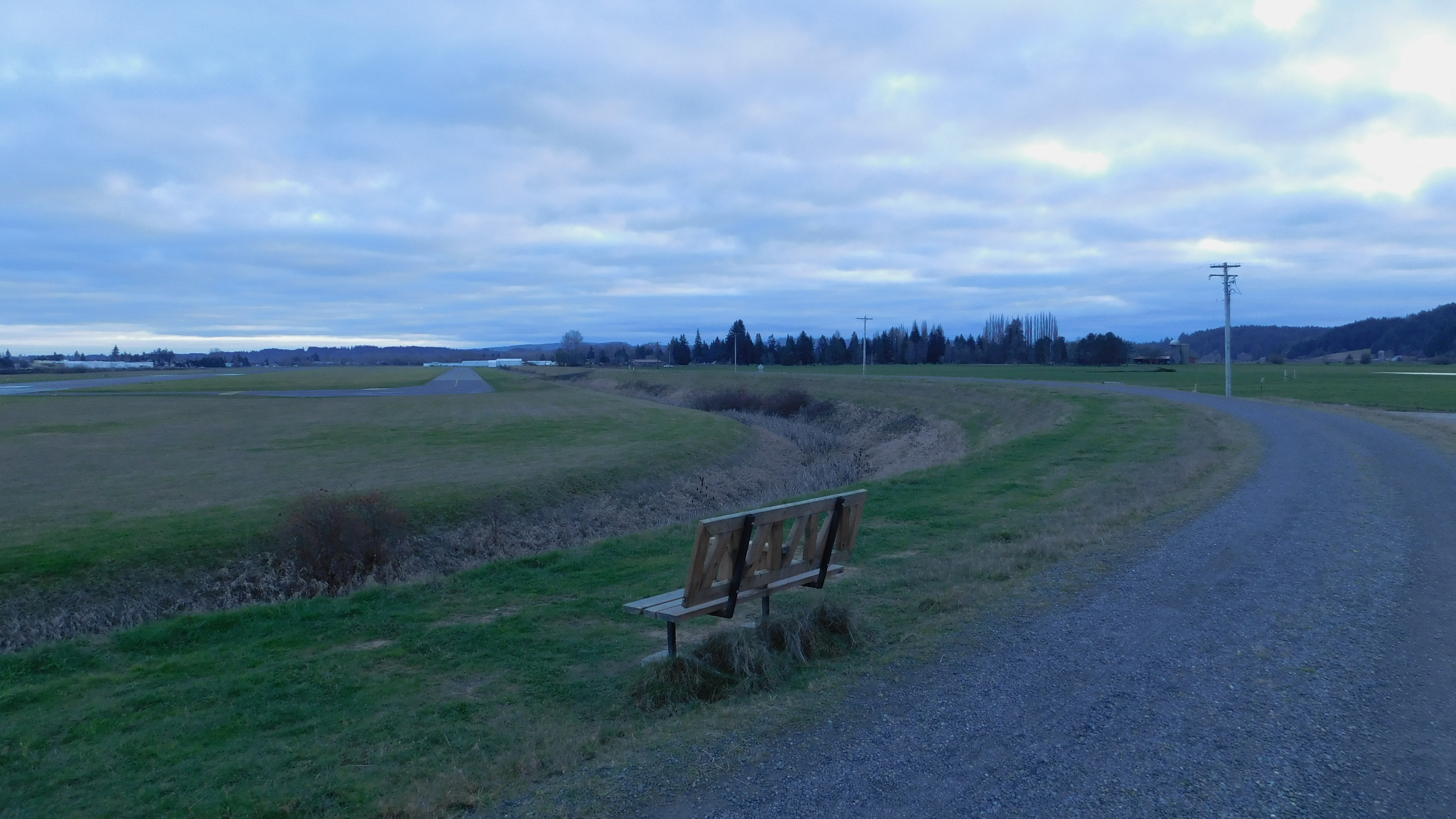
The levee protecting the Chehalis-Centralia Airport

After the 1933 flood, a bill was introduced in 1934 in the federal legislature asking for $7.5 million in funds to construct a variety of flood and water control measures of waterways in the region, including dams, improving navigation in rivers, and repairing watersheds, with special attention on soil erosion and protecting the local agriculture. Based on a survey of the 1933 event, another federal bill followed a year later once again requesting flood control for the Chehalis River. A meeting was held with the United States Department of Agriculture and War Department at the Lewis County Courthouse in 1937, to advise and explain the loss of farmland and subsequent costs of flood damages in the Chehalis basin.

During World War II, the Department of War and the Army Corps of Engineers built levees around the Chehalis–Centralia Airport and in 1942 installed a levee pump. During severe flooding from the Great Coastal Gale of 2007, the pump failed forcing an intentional break of the levee leading to increased damages to the community. An electric two-pump station was completed in 2018 with funding provided by the Chehalis River Basin Authority at a cost of $1.14 million. The pumps, able to siphon as much as 12,000 gallons per minute, worked flawlessly during the January 2022 flood event.

After the repeated floods in the 1970s, renewed calls were made for reducing the economic and social impacts of flooding. An ongoing survey since the 1950s, known as the Upper Chehalis Basin Project, was pushed for finalization. The dormant plans included a storage dam that could also be used as a source of irrigation. Additional ideas during this time were calls for more dikes on the local river systems, deepening the Chehalis River, and legal restrictions on building in the floodplain. Most of the plans or ideas were considered too costly at the time by the Army Corps of Engineers, including expenditures on check dams and additional dikes that would outweigh the potential return in local economic benefits.

Flood control measures, including levees, dams, and relocations, were repeatedly rejected by various local groups, as well as regional, state, and federal governments and agencies between the 1960s and into the 1980s. Funding and permission to build levees around the Twin Cities were finally approved by the federal government, but it was found that the project would not protect the highway and would make flooding worse outside of the levee zone. Recommendations sent to the state legislature from a joint committee formed after the January 1990 flood produced no plans after two years of efforts. A Comprehensive Flood Hazard Management Plan (CFHMP) was initiated as well and completed in 1994. The plan was required at the time for any potential state funding for future flood control maintenance and the report specifically mentioned that despite several studies and promises for over 60 years, no actual flood control solutions had been implemented.

Beginning in 1991, in order to protect the Chehalis Industrial Park and salmon runs through the area, flood control work was begun on Dillenbaugh Creek, a 17 square miles (44 km^{2}) watershed near the Port of Chehalis; the project was unregulated but later approved by the state. The Lewis County Flood Control District began work on salmon habitat restoration and flood control on the creek in the late 1990s. Additional flood trenches, with focus on maintaining a healthy salmon migration route, were constructed into the early 2000s.

Government and community meetings months after the 100-year flood of 1996 reiterated the lack of funding for large flood control projects and encouraged public outreach and education and the flood-proofing of buildings. The first website with information on the conditions of local rivers and flood programs was created. The city submitted a request for the state to purchase $1.4 million worth of homes and property in flood prone areas in Chehalis. After the small 1997 flood, the Twin Cities announced an attempt for a flood zone tax district and the county reproposed several flood control efforts including diverting around or removing a bend in the Chehalis River near the Skookumchuck conjunction.

=== 21st century ===
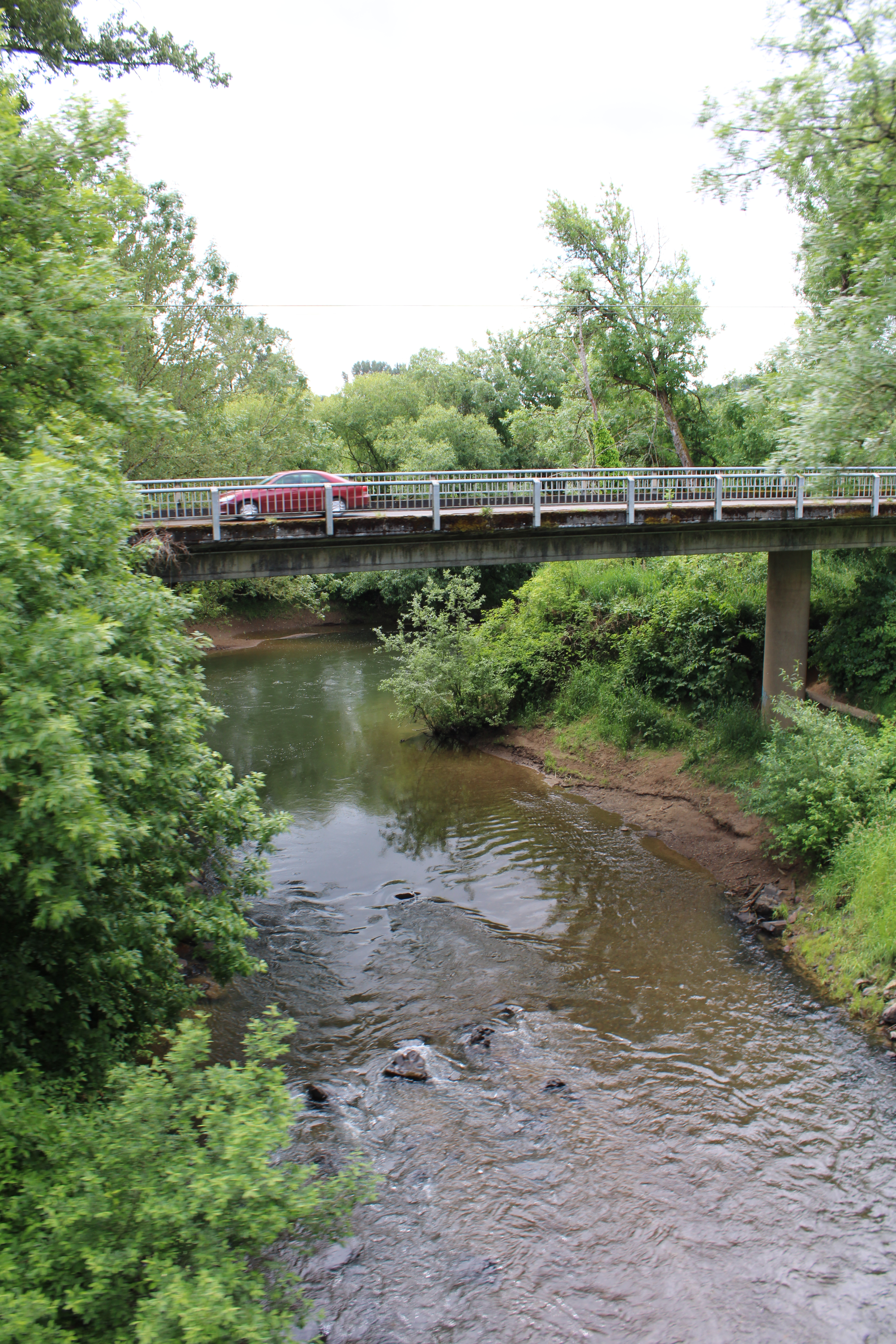
The Newaukum River

Following the 2003 flood, FEMA released new flood maps for the Newaukum River that also included its forks near Forest, Washington; flood maps in the area had not been updated since the 1970s. In the same year a $30 million plan was authorized by the state legislature meant to expand the Skoomkumchuck Dam (built 1970) and build levees; it was rejected by the county, as well as the cities of Centralia and Chehalis, due to concerns of future maintenance costs. Another plan was agreed upon in 2005 by another commission, the Chehalis River Flood Reduction Project, that included designs for new levees and improvements to the Skookumchuck Dam. It failed to move forward due to complications from the planned widening of the interstate, the find of a potential archaeological site at the Chehalis and Skookumchuck junction, and failed funding for the $100 million project.

In 2006, expected supplemental funding of up to $30 million to build the embankments were changed to other projects in the state after the annual budget bill was passed. A late legislative request earmarked $2.5 million to make improvements to Airport Road around the airfield. By the end of 2006, during another flood event, Chehalis and Centralia opted out of a joint "Flood Control Plan" with Lewis County meant to improve and build levees and to provide flood protection upgrades to the dam. The refusal was based on concerns the project did not take into account other areas of need, and that the financial return was not worth the upfront costs.

The severity of the 2007 submergence, connected to increases in building up of the floodplain, led to another attempt of a suspension of allowed construction in the watershed. Despite talks over bans since the 1986 flood, city officials denied that the use of fill had any major impact and that the need to build on flood lands were necessary for the city's economy. Planned FEMA flood maps, which were in the process of being updated since 2005, incorporated details of the 2007 flood into the maps, with particular attention to areas in Chehalis that had no previous record of being submerged.

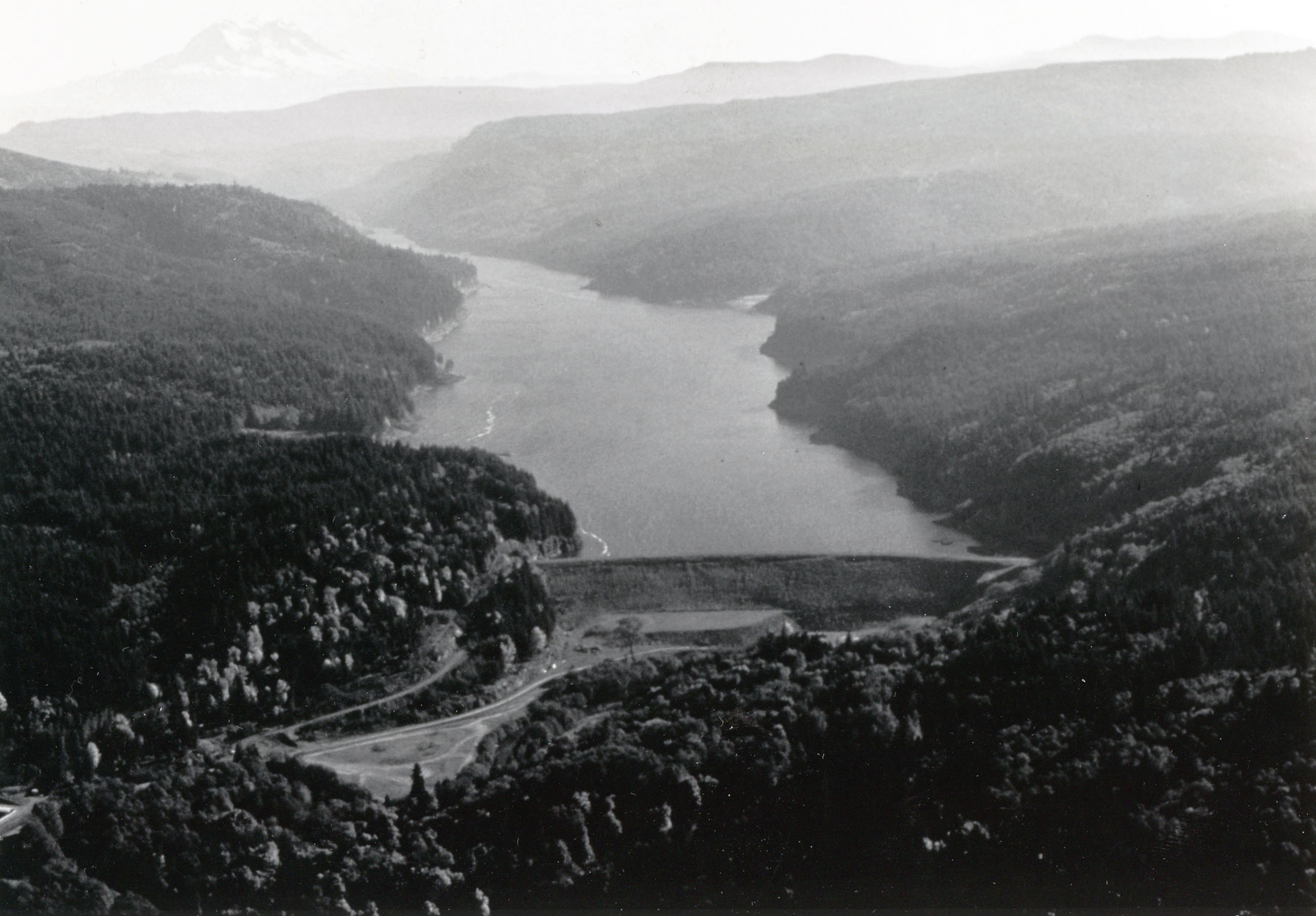
Aerial view, Skookumchuck Dam

In addition to the 2007 flood, the 2009 event, which shut down I-5 for the fourth time since 1990, spurred the reintroduction of plans to raise the height of levees, and built additional embankments, in the region. Limited funding was provided for extra gauges and better warning systems. The potential project for the Skookumchuck Dam, meant to increase the amount of water the dam could hold, was reintroduced, and a new flood district, with the ability to raise taxes, was proposed. Proposals in the 2010s by the Washington State Department of Transportation (WSDOT) centered on protecting I-5, either by widening and raising the highway, or building additional levees or walls. The projects, estimated to cost as much as $550 million, was locally rejected due to the focus on the interstate, rather than an approach of a basin-wide strategy.

After the 2009 flood, federal funding of $1.7 million was authorized to continue to study flood mitigation in the Twin Cities. A bill restricting development in 100-year floodplains was passed by the House of the state legislature, though it was opposed by local representatives over concerns that the bill intruded on local government rights. A state Senate bill was also passed, allowing for the potential creation of a flood district with taxing power between counties in the Chehalis River basin. The unanimously passed bill died in the House after it was deemed unacceptable to a voting bloc of representatives after changes to the bill, particularly the voting of memberships to the district board, were introduced in a committee. Official drafts of FEMA flood maps were released at the end of 2010 after being delayed to incorporate new information from the major floods in the 2000s. The updated maps almost doubled the amount of flood prone, floodplain, and floodway areas in the city.

The levees at the Chehalis—Centralia Airport were widened from 15 feet (4.6 m) to 30 feet (9.1 m) beginning in 2013. The efforts were part of a two-phase, $1.2 million project to increase the levee structure's size, providing additional flood protection to the transportation hub and surrounding business district. The 1.8-mile (2.9 km) long earthen system was planned to protect the surrounding area from a 50-year flood event.

A partnership study that accounted for climate change was released in 2022 and recommended the city and surrounding area to prepare for more major floods by increasing stormwater drainage, reducing timber production to allow for more old-growth forests, eliminating clearcutting, and suggesting an increase in floodproofing homes and businesses.

=== Chehalis Basin Flood Authority and Strategy ===
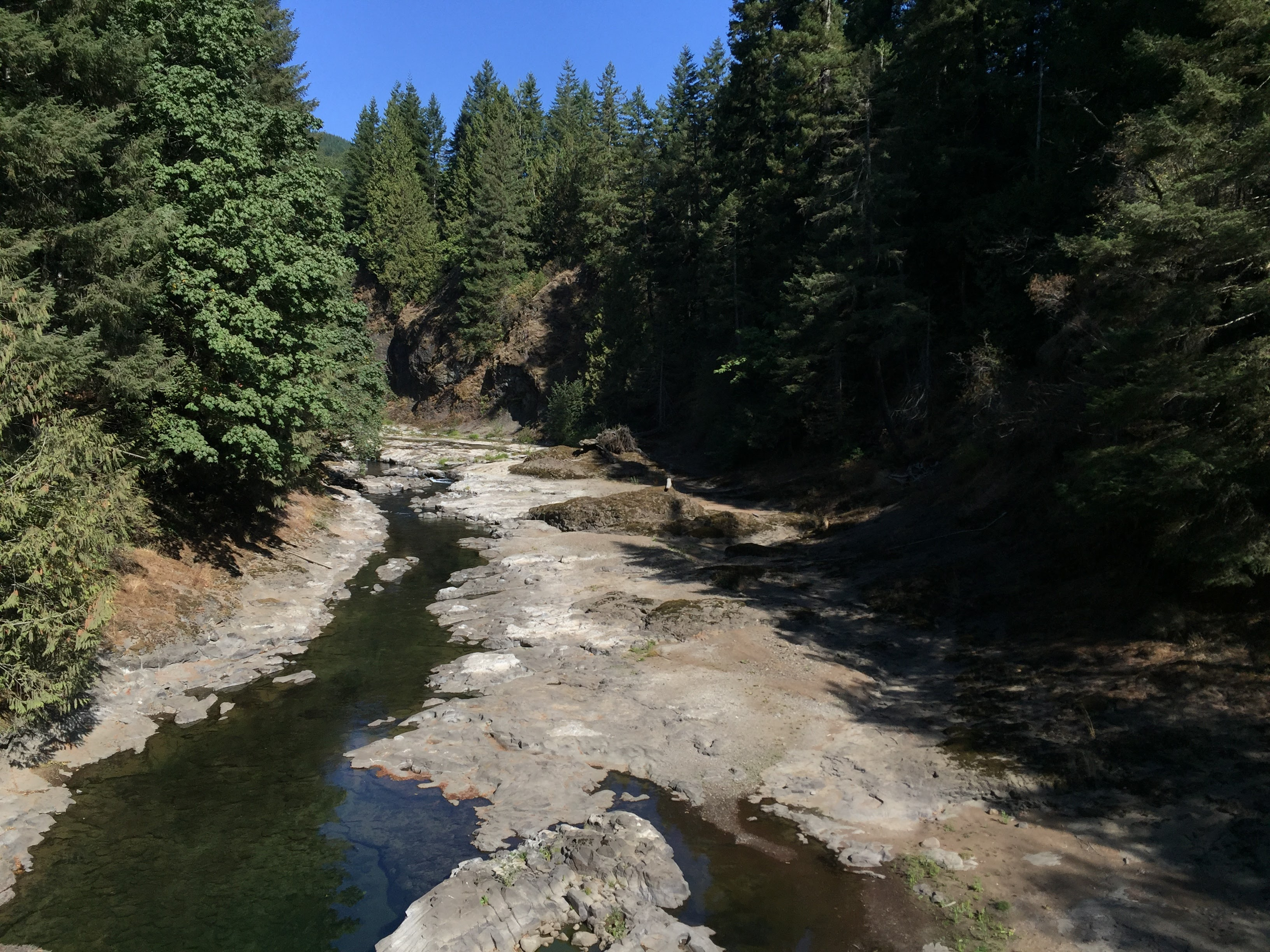
The Upper Chehalis River near Pe Ell

The Chehalis River Basin Flood Authority (CRBFA), which is overseen and funded by the Washington Department of Ecology Office of Chehalis Basin (OCB), directs flood control measures, flooding concerns, and advance flood warnings for the Chehalis River watershed. Beginning in 2010, Chehalis residents can be alerted via email by the authority's online flood warning system known as the Chehalis Basin Flood Warning System (FWS). The FWS provides information on rainfall, temperature, and river and stream gauge readings in the area.

As part of the CRBFA is the Chehalis Basin Strategy, a partnership formed in 2014 to mitigate flooding and to restore aquatic habitat, particularly for local Chinook salmon. The alliance is a conglomerate of regional governments in and around Lewis County, in association with Native American tribes, environmental groups, scientists, and local citizens The group offered proposals that outlined several flood control reduction measures, with downstream levee improvements especially at the Chehalis–Centralia Airport, and a flood retention dam in Pe Ell which is expected to limit catastrophic damage from 100-year floods within the Chehalis River Basin.

The projects are to be carried out in three phases. The first phase began in 2012 and declared complete in the early 2020s with a combined 140 flood and habitat projects completed at a cost of $152 million. The second stage was implemented soon thereafter and is focused on long-term solutions and strategy for flood control and financial backing of future tasks. The final phase is planned to begin in the mid-2020s and will target construction, additional financing, and devising long-term structural government oversight.

=== Flood insurance ===
As of 2025, there are an estimated 424 residential and commercial buildings within the designated 100-year floodplain of Chehalis. Flood insurance policies under the National Flood Insurance Program covered over 171 residences and 17 businesses. The city's percentage for flood insurance is almost three times higher than nearby Centralia, where more than 2,700 structures are calculated to exist in a similar floodplain.

== See also ==
- Great Gale of 1880
- Columbus Day storm of 1962
- January 2012 Pacific Northwest snowstorm
