= Green Hill School (Chehalis, Washington) =

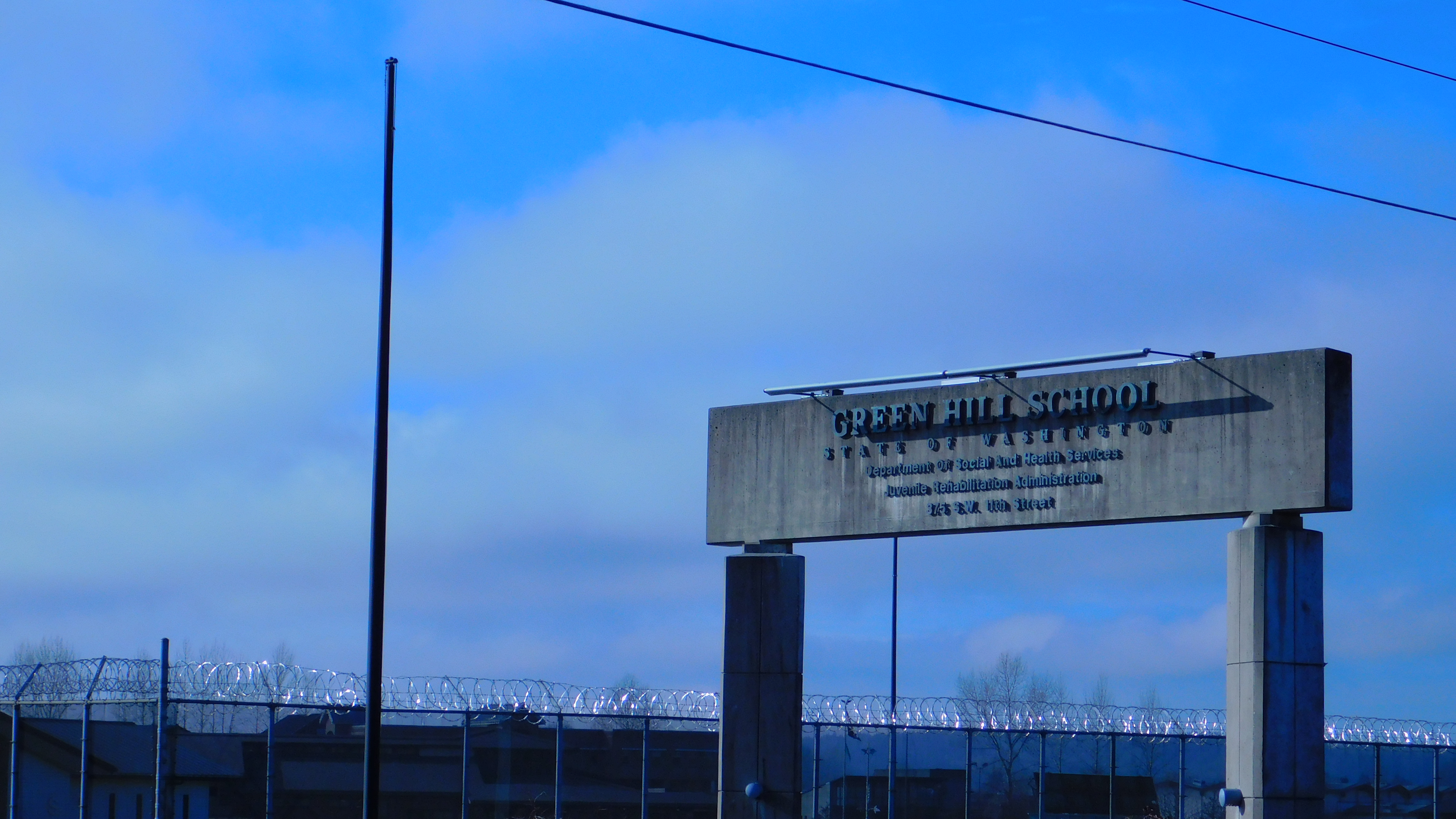
- Green Hill School, 2022

Location
- 375 SW 11th Street; Chehalis, Washington 98532; 46°38′59″N 122°57′44″W

Information
- School type: Youth detention center
- Established: 1891 (as Washington State Reform School)
- School district: Chehalis School District
- Superintendent: Jennifer Redman
- Gender: Male

Green Hill School is part of Washington state's correctional system under the Juvenile Rehabilitation Administration, and is the state's only maximum security penitentiary for youths. It is located in the South Market district of Chehalis on I-5, next to Recreation Park.

The school is independently managed by the Washington Department of Children, Youth and Families (DCYF). It provides "academic classes and vocational training and works" for adolescent males who have been incarcerated. Green Hill is also the location of the Lewis County Juvenile Court and the Lewis County Juvenile Jail, separate facilities from the school itself.

== Description ==
Green Hill School is described as a medium-to-maximum security prison for young men considered to be either juveniles or adults between the ages of 17 and 25. The facility is the largest youth penitentiary, and the only one designated as maximum security, in Washington state. The residents are referred to as inmates or incarcerated individuals. The young men are able to continue their education, with the opportunity to receive a high school diploma and secondary honors, such as technical certifications or bachelor's degrees.

The school is independently managed by the Washington Department of Children, Youth and Families (DCYF).

== History ==
=== 19th century ===
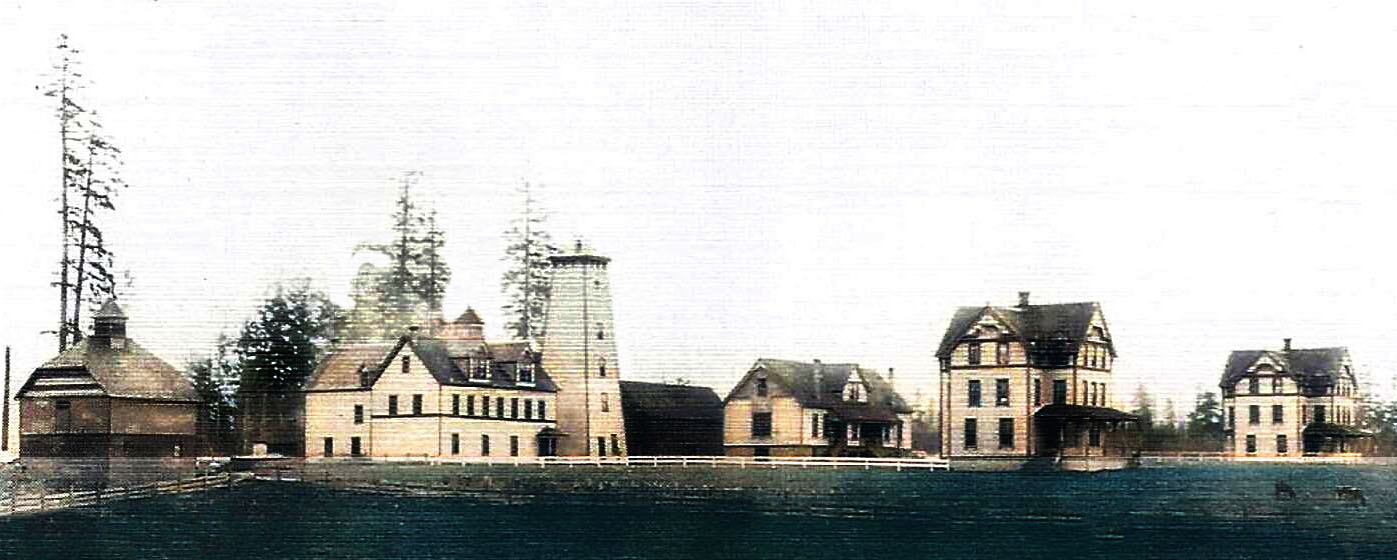
Washington State Reform School, 1899

Begun by law in 1891 under the name, Washington State Reform School, it was originally open to both girls and boys as young as 8 years old who were orphaned or convicted of a crime. Young women would be sent to a girls-only reform school, named Maple Lane, in Grand Mound beginning in 1913. The name was changed to Washington State Training School in the early 20th century. (Note: Recollections of the year that the name was changed vary as either 1907 or 1915. See sources listed.)

=== 20th century ===
Gymnasium, 1920s

In the early 20th century, Green Hill students had a band that would march in local parades and celebrations, oftentimes to raise funds for the school and student activities. Fundraisers sometimes included performing in minstrel shows, a common activity at the time, often at theaters in the city. Students were taught a variety of vocational trades, including shop and farming.

During the 1920s, housing space for students was found lacking with a shortage of 70 beds. A tent was used as temporary housing and the original dormitory's first floor was remodeled into sleeping quarters. Students, under supervision, helped to construct a 40 ft × 148 ft (12 m × 45 m) dairy barn on the grounds beginning in late 1924. The training school during the 1920s provided their own milk by using a stable of cows; the dairy production also provided for the needs of the Grand Mound girls' school. Green Hill, continuing to field a band, organized an orchestra and pupils were taught music theory.

The school faced severe damages totaling $2 million from the 1949 Olympia earthquake. Two buildings were torn down in the aftermath and two dormitories were declared as condemned. Over 30 boys were sent home, to be recalled later, due to crowded conditions from the lack of housing at the school.

Despite being a place of incarcerated individuals, the training school initially did not have any fencing or attentive security, allowing students to escape with some ease until the 1970s. Building a security fence became of importance in the late 1950s and early 1960s due to a larger number of escapes and subsequent increases in crime, particularly auto theft and property damage, caused by the runaways. Attempts to fund and build a security fence were undertaken in 1963. Considered unnecessary by the superintendent of Green Hill at the time, large settlements paid out by the state due to the escapee damages had surpassed the cost of constructing a fence. Though it passed the state Senate, it failed to pass the House by the session deadline. With the negative attention on escapes and runaway crimes, the facility, by way of the student council, undertook a public relations tour in Chehalis and Centralia during the early 1970s. Students volunteered on various projects in the Twin Cities, including clearing land during the early stages of the creation of Stan Hedwall Park, repairing damages due to floods at the Southwest Washington Fairgrounds, and assisting senior citizens in helping to maintain their yards and homes.

The facility undertook the moniker, Green Hill School, and the grounds, listed as 35 acres (14 ha), were officially annexed by the city in 1972.

=== 21st century ===
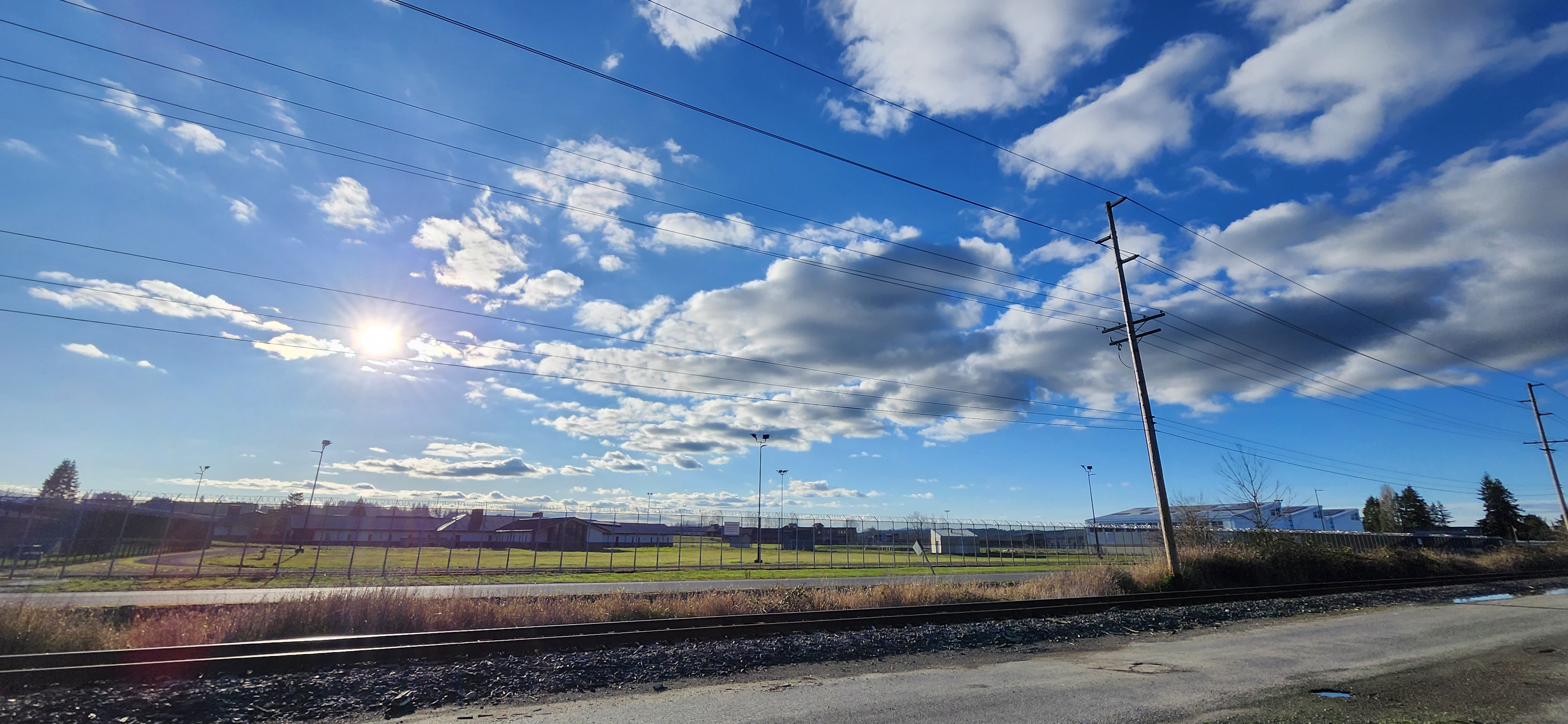
Grounds of Green Hill, from Recreation Park, 2026

The facility was reassigned under the oversight of the Washington State Department of Children, Youth and Families (DCYF) in July 2019, part of a statewide transfer of juvenile facilities from the state's Department of Social and Health Services (DSHS).

Due to issues with overcrowding, the state temporarily suspended the residency of any newly sentenced juvenile offender to Green Hill in July 2024. With a target capacity of up to 180 incarcerated people, the facility saw an increase of 30% above the threshold in one year, reaching 240 by mid-2024. The rise in population, attributed to the passage of the JR to 25 law, was accompanied by increased violence and other unsafe behaviors, limiting rehabilitation efforts as well as leading to higher risks to support staff. Less than a week later, 43 inmates over the age of 21 who had sentences that would continue past the age of 25, were transferred from Green Hill to an adult prison in Shelton, Washington. The 43 men were moved back to Green Hill two weeks later after an order from a Thurston County Superior Court judge, finding that the DCYF was in violation of a settlement agreement requiring the agency to provide advanced notice, attorney representation, and court hearings to residents before being transferred.

Governor Jay Inslee visited the school in November 2024 to announce plans to add another youth detention facility in Aberdeen, Washington to ease the overcrowding issue at Green Hill. The governor reiterated the usefulness of the JR to 25 program, citing the increased violence at the site was juvenile in nature and the increased placement of offenders due to rising gun violence.

After an increase in riot charges at Green Hill in the 21st century, a state law was passed and signed in April 2025 removing the ability to file felony riot charges against residents in state juvenile detention centers. The newer law, known as House Bill 1815, reversed a 2021 bill allowing riot charges; Washington was one of only six states to charge juvenile offenders with such. Green Hill School accounted for 65% of the total state riot charges between 2005 and 2023. An infraction system was substituted instead, focusing on rehabilitation of Green Hill students rather than continuing punishment. The bill allows charges of misdemeanor assault or felony custodial assault against adult staff or volunteers. Approximately 100 prior riot convictions were eligible to be overturned or vacated.

Green Hill instituted changes for behavioral management for resident violations that includes a tier-level response system based on the seriousness of the issue. The plan is meant to reduce bias while increasing trust, using an "intervention matrix" geared for consistent responses based on an appropriate and logical approach to violations.

=== Audits, crime, and lawsuits ===
==== 2010s ====
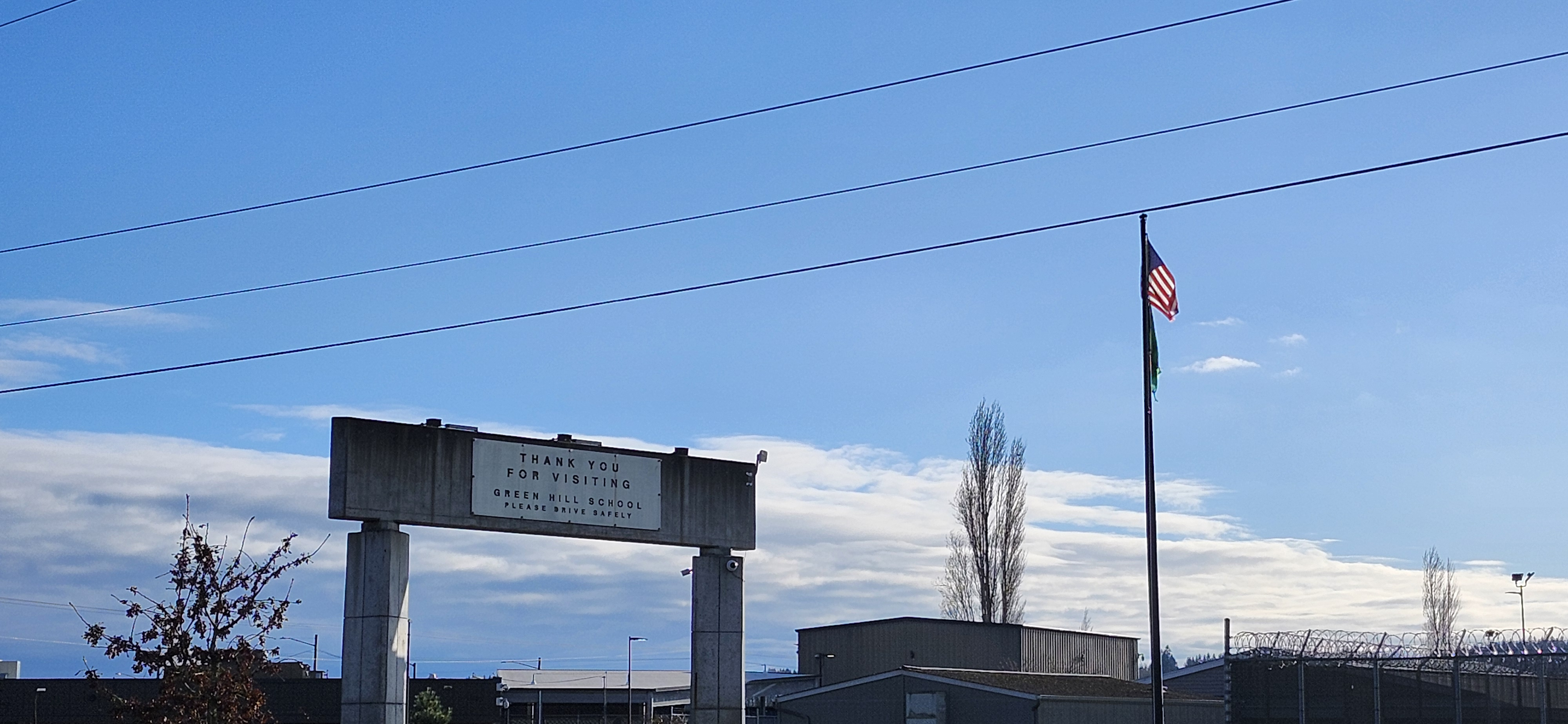
Back of entrance sign, 2026

The state guidelines for solitary confinement of juveniles was changed due to a lawsuit brought in 2018 that highlighted excessive use of the punishment at Green Hill. The DCYF implemented policies restricting the use of solitary confinement and provided additional procedures for strip searches, including the application of restraints against refusing inmates.

A 2019 federal audit, part of a mandated 3-year inspection under the Prison Rape Elimination Act of 2003 (PREA), found that the facility was out of compliance regarding the proper proportion of employees to residents which led to an increase of sexual abuse and a vulnerability for other safety issues. The report stated that the school is required to have an 1:8 staff to detainee ratio. A following inspection that same year by the Washington State Department of Labor and Industries (LNI) found no health code violations but advocated for additional inspections for the safety and training of staff.

==== 2020s ====
In 2021, a sexual abuse lawsuit originally filed in 2018 was settled for $2.1 million. The case, brought by 10 former juvenile residents, stem from allegations of a pattern of pervasive abuse occurring at the facility between 1976 and 2008. Additionally in the same year, a guard was convicted of a federal bribery charge after an FBI investigation revealed the employee accepted cash over several years from school residents or their family, in exchange for providing contraband, such as marijuana and cell phones.

An investigation started in 2022 by a combined task force of local and Washington state agencies, known as the Joint Narcotics Enforcement Team (JNET), began after a teenage resident survived a fentanyl overdose at the school. The JNET was able to seize more than 1,000 pills and it led to drug charges of four people. Hiring practices were augmented after an incident that year when a security officer, who was previously an inmate at Green Hill, was involved in a drive-by shooting with a recently released student. The JNET investigation renewed in 2023 after additional reports of drugs on the campus. During a warrant search, JNET found numerous stores of contraband taken from students going back to 2017, including large amounts of illicit substances and detailed information on illegal transactions. The warrant and seizures of evidence did not lead to further investigation by the state's Attorney General office, as it was noted that increased security measures, as well as employee screening, for the facility had been installed or implemented. Charges and arraignments stemming from the investigation were brought forth in the county in early 2024, which included several inmates and a staff member.

Due to the investigations, Green Hill staff began in October 2023 to report assault and contraband incidents to the Chehalis Police Department that involved more than three offenders. Total police reports for the year prior were listed as 15, climbing to 74 in 2023, with over 200 incidents reported by the end of 2024.

The 2023 year included filed charges of twelve riots, with an additional eight cases based on the 2022 JNET investigation. The largest of the riots included an August standoff with detention staff involving 6 students and a September incident involving nine residents of the school who were arraigned on felony prison riot charges stemming from a fight. Another brawl, also involving nine students, occurred one week later, with a felony riot charge submitted to the Lewis County Superior Court. Of the total riots, two were tied to gang-related activity.

The Washington Court of Appeals ruled in August 2025 that conditions at the school, particularly confinement and lockdown procedures, violated the law. Prior to the ruling, residents were confined to "dry cells", or rooms without bathrooms or running water. In combination with low staffing, students were often held without basic necessities during lockdowns. Further investigations, as described by various lawsuits and reports heard by the appeals court, noted that gang activity limited student availability to mental health and basic hygiene resources. Students were required to use hand held urinals. Additionally, new residents were found to be coerced into gang-related drug trafficking at Green Hill and up to three students could be held in a cell meant for one. A class action lawsuit was filed the same month on the attempt to relocate students to Harbor Heights in Aberdeen during 2024. The lawsuit alleged damaged personal property and the loss of rights during the relocation, as well as retaliation by staff when the students were transferred back to Green Hill.

Between 2022 and 2024, safety incidents at the school increased from 1,100 to approximately 5,200. The Chehalis Police Department recorded 117 investigations involving Green Hill School during 2025.

=== JR to 25 ===
After the facility became of use as a detention center only for boys, Green Hill was eventually established specifically for older adolescent males. Adult males could be kept at the facilities until the age of 21 but a law, known as JR to 25 and passed in 2018, allowed for males who were incarcerated for crimes made prior to the age of 18 could remain at Green Hill up to the age of 25. After passage of JR to 25, Green Hill saw increases in crime, specifically drug and gang related activity, as well as riots. Security on the grounds were improved, with attention to additional staffing, patrols, security equipment and screening, restrictions for visits or to limit aggression, and additional educational opportunities.

== Education ==
Green Hill School provides education from elementary level to high school classes, as well as GED programs. Vocational training is also offered, which includes courses for automobile maintenance, carpentry, and cosmetology. The school offers courses that allow for certification in forklift operations and welding, as well as an opportunity to become licensed as a barber in the state via the curriculum's Culture Barber Academy.

Beginning in 2019, opportunities for students to earn an associate or bachelor's degree were implemented. Partnering with Centralia College the following year, the effort included a job training program. The first associate degree awarded occurred in 2022 and a group of five students were the inaugural recipients of a bachelor's degree in 2024. The bachelor's program was suspended after the 2026 year due to low enrollment as more students were opting for vocational training instead. During the brief period, ten Green Hill residents earned a bachelor's degree.

A team of seven teenage residents at Green Hill were awarded first prize at the Substance Abuse and Mental Health Services Administration's competition, the National Anti-Fentanyl Awareness Youth Challenge. The award was for the group's song and accompanying video, Dark Road. The video was produced in partnership with The Bridge Music Project, an Olympia non-profit, and the youth group was the only winner that included members living in a juvenile rehabilitation center.

=== Mentoring ===
In order for young men to break from a cycle of crime, or gang activity, the school offers several mentorship programs. One program allows new students to acclimate to their incarceration and the structured school setting. Cultural, ethnic, and religious programs are also offered that help to promote "awareness and inclusivity".

== Residency ==
As of 2024, the average length of stay for a student was 272 days. Green Hill School has a target goal of no more than 150 residents at any one time and considers an occupancy above 180 to be unsafe. The student population was noted to be 180 by August 2026.

== Staffing ==
As of April 2026, Green Hill School has a staff totaling 438 people, which includes 91 counselors and 248 security personnel. Though the facility added more than 100 employees in 2025, the school was considered understaffed, with over 40 vacancies in various departments needed to be filled.

Employee turnover rate was recorded to be 22.8% in 2026.

== Funding ==
The academics of Green Hill School is overseen by the Chehalis School District but full funding is provided by the state of Washington.

As of 2024, additional funds are raised by charging parents or guardians of incarcerated students a fee. The monies are used to cover incarceration and treatment costs. Known as "parent pay", the fee requirement has existed since 1977 and is an additional monetary requirement above restitution. Despite the DCYF rejecting the need for the system based on concerns of poverty and the program disproportionally affecting people of color, the policy remains in effect.

== Features ==
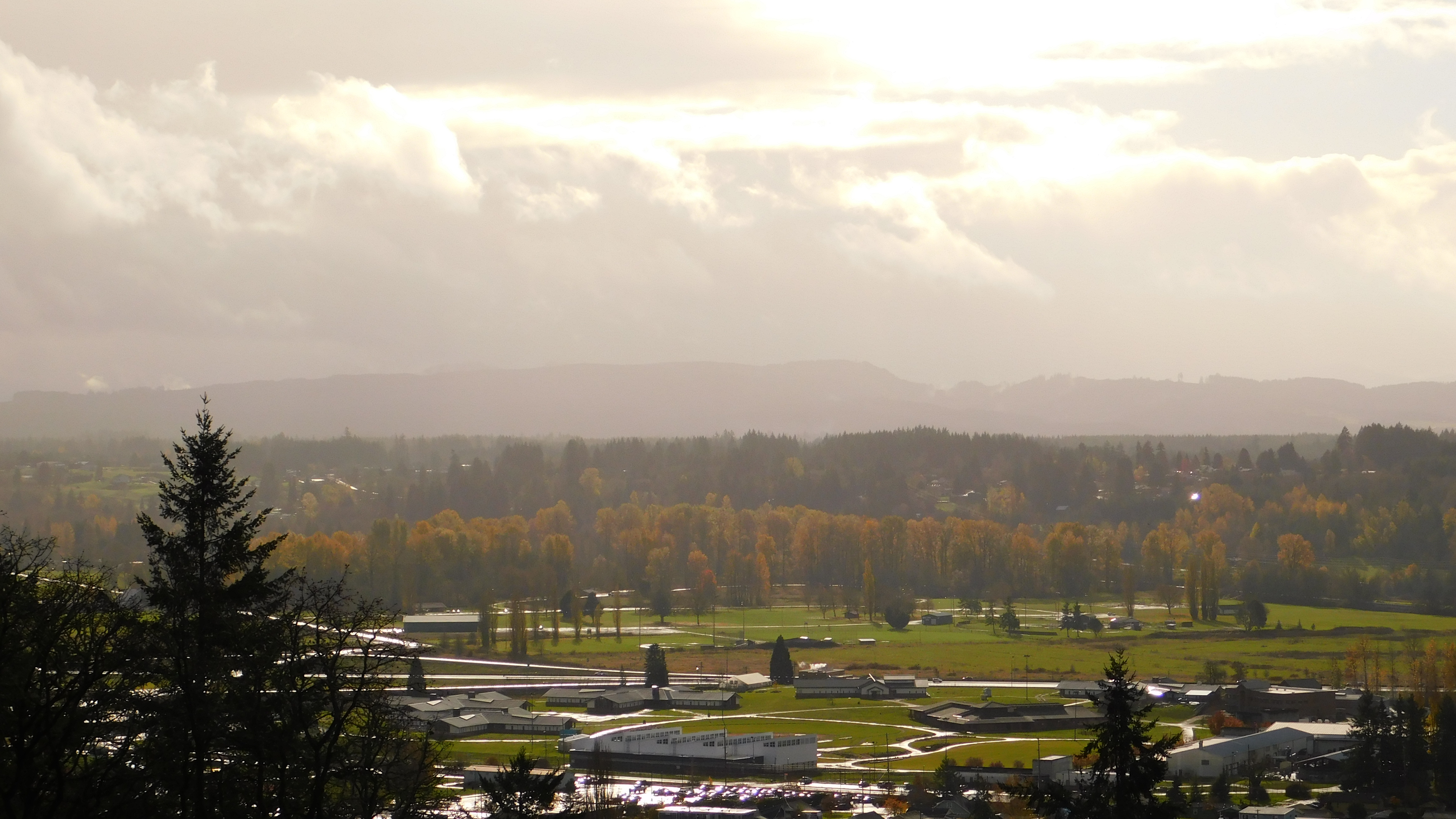
Green Hill School grounds, 2023

Students have access to a wellness center on the grounds that provides a wide variety of physical, mental, and emotional health activities. Known as the Green Hill School Recreation and Wellness Center, the zero-energy building is landscaped with rain gardens and consists a covered sports area, a swimming pool, an indoor multi-use room, and gymnasium that feature a basketball court and rock climbing wall.

Students are offered 50 minutes of a "recreation block", and depending on behavior, program involvement, or lack of violations, can receive as much as three hours of recreation time per day. Movie nights, various intramural and racket sports, and gardening are available to students.

== Lewis County Juvenile Court ==
The overall grounds of Green Hill include the Lewis County Juvenile Court Administration and courthouse. Directed by a county approved contract of $7.2 million, the administration buildings, including an additional courtroom and outdoor recreation areas, were remodeled and enlarged in 2023.

A separate jail facility, the Lewis County Juvenile Detention Center, is located at the site. Used for youths who are awaiting trial at the juvenile court, the facility can house up to 18 individuals. As of 2025, the average length of stay is 10 days and no youth, by law, can be detained for more the 30 days.

Similar to the confines of Green Hill, youths have access to medical care, including mental health services, and can participate in art, educational, or skills training courses. An outdoor area, featuring a garden and greenhouse, was built in 2024.

== Notable residents ==
- Charles Rodman Campbell, executed American serial killer
- Jake Lee Eakin and Evan Drake Savoie, pair convicted for the murder of Craig Sorger
- Colton Harris Moore, former fugitive known as the Barefoot Bandit
- Harmon Metz Waley, confined 1929, member of the group responsible for the George Weyerhaeuser kidnapping

== See also ==
- Lewis County Jail
