= Cascade School (Chehalis, Washington) =

NRHP-listed site in Chehalis, Washington

- U.S. National Register of Historic Places
- Washington State Heritage Register
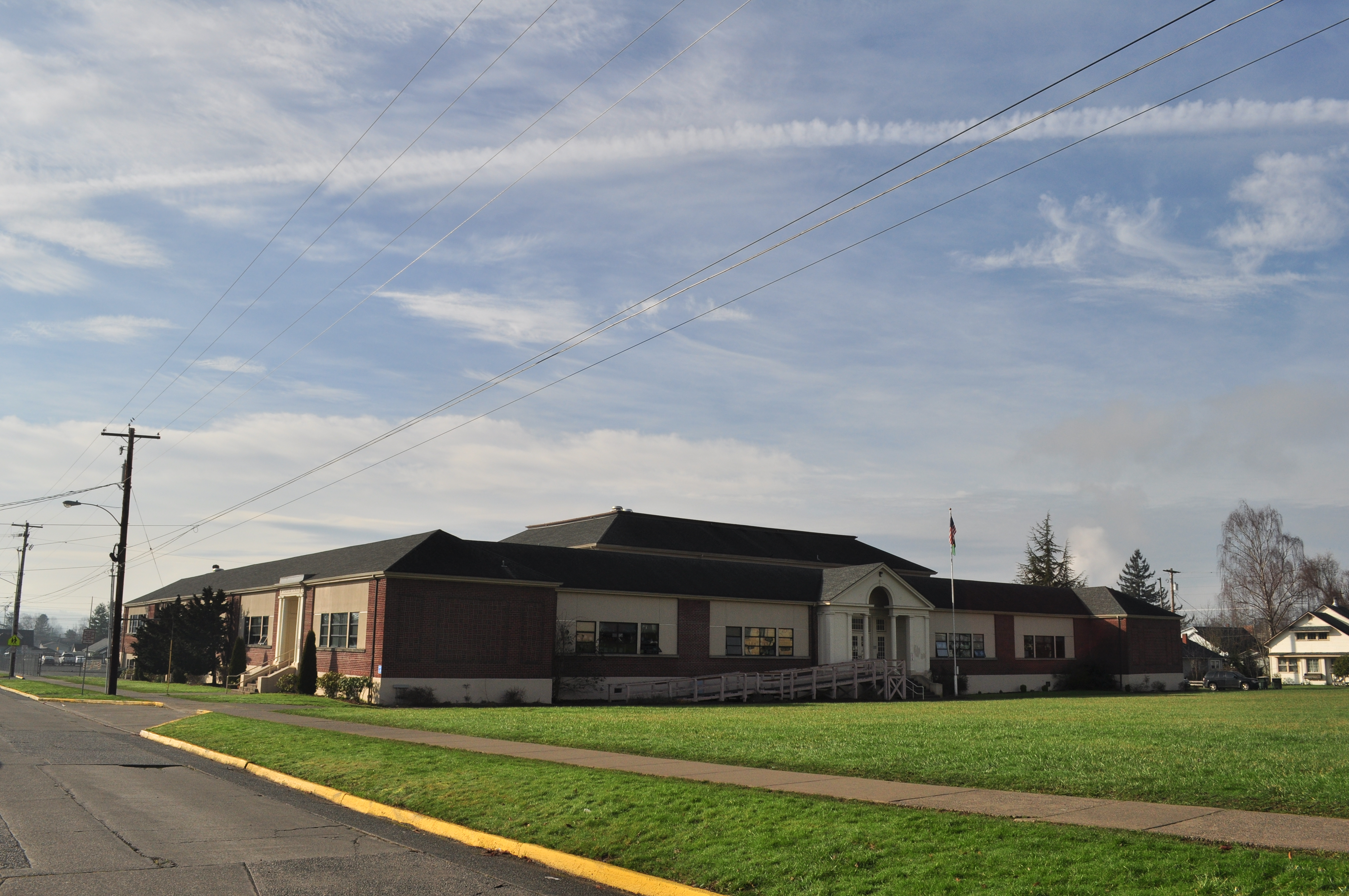
- Cascade School, 2015

- Location within Washington (state)
- Location: 101 SW Second Street, Chehalis, Washington
- Coordinates: 46°39′52″N 122°58′06″W
- Area: 2.08 acres (0.84 ha)
- Built: 1922
- Built by: E.P. Brewster, Pat Manning
- Architect: Hill, Mock & Griffin, Jacque "Jack" DeForest Griffin
- Architectural style: Classical Revival (Neo-classical Revival)
- Restored: 2025
- NRHP reference No.: 100012691

Significant dates
- Added to NRHP: February 5, 2026
- Designated WSHR: September 23, 2025

Cascade School, also known as Cascade Elementary School, is a schoolhouse located in a residential area of Chehalis, Washington. The school, converted into an apartment building in 2025, was added to the National Register of Historic Places (NRHP) in 2026.

The one-floor, Neo-classical revival schoolhouse was built between Market Street and Cascade Avenue in 1922, replacing an existing school building known as East Side School. A lack of funds prevented the full plans of the construction to be implemented. The school's gymnasium was completed in 1923, a classroom and basement addition was finished in 1924, and two wings were constructed in 1925 and 1956 to accommodate a growing student population. The school underwent several modernization and remodeling projects between the 1950s and 1970s.

The East Side School's footprint and prior playground were expanded multiple times for Cascade School recreation purposes, including efforts for a new playground and a tennis court in the 1920s, as well as the build of an athletic field and grandstand for the city's high school in the 1930s. A covered play shed was added to the playground in 1960.

The size of Cascade School, since its beginnings, was never large enough to house the number of elementary students in the city. Additional schools were built in Chehalis due to a lack of space at Cascade. By the 1990s and 2000s, the "usable lifespan" of the schoolhouse had been exceeded. The facility became a safety and financial concern, requiring large amounts of funding for renovations, repairs, and retrofitting. Efforts to publicly fund either a replacement of the building, or to update Cascade School, began in 2010. A bond was passed in 2015 to construct a campus of two elementary schools in Chehalis; the schools were completed in 2018 and students from Cascade began transferring to the new campus.

The last students taught at Cascade School was a third grade class during the spring semester, 2019. During vacancy, the schoolhouse was proposed to be either demolished as a future multi-use, commercial site or be converted into a residential facility. The building was sold in 2021 and remodeled as an apartment building. The schoolhouse became known as Cascade Apartments and opened for residential use in 2025.

== Background ==
The first known school in Chehalis, originally named Saundersville or "Saunders Bottom", was held in an "abandoned log cabin" during the early 1850s. (Note: The school year in the log cabin school lasted three months. The rural location led to a reported incident of a teacher shooting a cougar from a window in the schoolhouse.) Classes were moved to a cabin on the land claim of the O. B. McFadden House where students were taught until the 1870s.

The first official school in Chehalis was located on the second floor of the city's first courthouse after the structure was built and opened in 1874. The school district was known at the time as, District No. 3 Saunder's Prairie. The students were relocated to an elementary, one room schoolhouse that was built in 1876 at the southwest corner of Center and State streets; the construction was reported to cost $600, equivalent to $18,141 in 2025. A second classroom was added in 1884 at a listed cost of $550 (equivalent to $19,708 in 2025).

=== East Side School ===
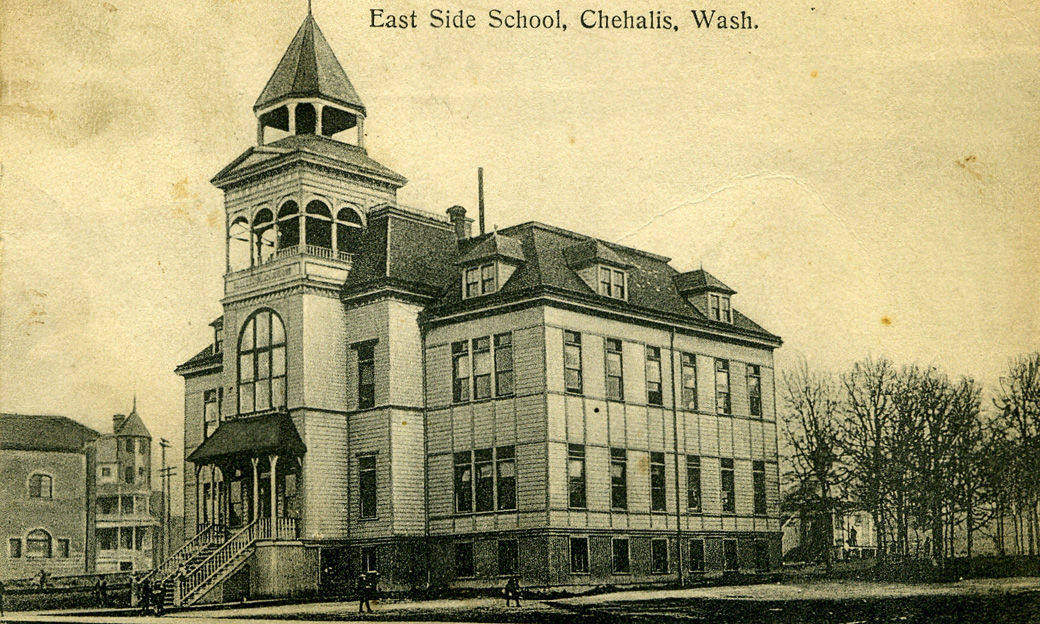
East Side School, c. 1900s

The East Side School was built beginning in 1889 and was the city's second, official organized school. The facility was built for $10,000, equivalent to $358,333 in 2025, (Note: Two bonds, $5,500 (equivalent to $197,083 in 2025) in 1889 and an additional $3,000 (equivalent to $107,500 in 2025) in 1890, were issued to complete the build of the East Side School.) on a lot located in the downtown district on Market Street. Originally meant for use as a high school, the wood-framed schoolhouse was known succinctly as "The High School" and consisted of a first floor meant for elementary students; the second floor was used for the high school. The school opened in September 1890.

Amid further demand for more schools in the city's growing population during the time, an elementary schoolhouse known as the West Side School was constructed in 1894 in the Pennsylvania Avenue-West Side Historic District; the East Side School temporarily became a high school-only facility. The continuation of a growing population required upgrades and additions to both schools in 1904.

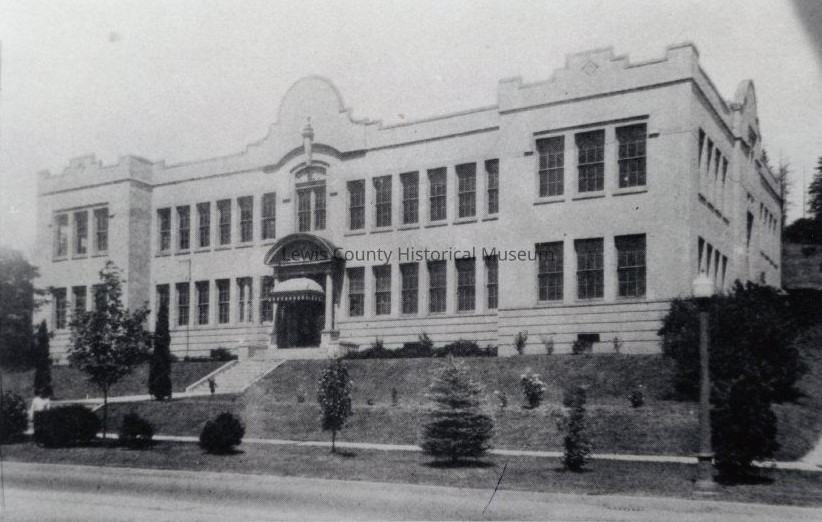
Chehalis High School, circa 1927

As the downtown area grew, and space becoming more necessary for commercial expansion, the East Side School was moved in 1909 to Cascade Avenue between 2nd and 3rd streets. (Note: The relocation of East Side School in 1909, including preparing the grounds and alterations to the building, was reported to cost $13,000 (equivalent to $465,833 in 2025). The city and school district noted the debt was offset by 1913 via generated revenues, the sale of the prior lot, and the sale of other school properties.) The school was used primarily for elementary level education in 1910 after the construction of the Chehalis High School. The school became known as the South Ward School but the name was officially changed to Cascade School in October 1913. The student assembly submitted a petition for the name change to the school board which accepted the proposal.

The student population in Chehalis by 1913 was recorded at 1,200 pupils. Up until the 1914 school year, the East Side-Cascade School was known to contain a larger portion of the city's elementary students than the West Side School. A city ruling that year required that any student above third grade living on the east side of Chehalis, and north of Main Street, was to attend West Side School. Protests over costs, as well as the dangers of pupils traveling over railroad tracks to do so, led to protests by parents.

A gymnasium for students of any age had long been lacking in the city. Chehalis High School students began efforts in November 1916 to construct a temporary gym structure on the grounds of the Cascade School; it was funded through donations. The footprint spanned 50 ft × 80 ft (15 m × 24 m) and contained bleachers, dressing rooms, and a 40 ft × 60 ft (12 m × 18 m) court. (Note: The playing court for the East Side School was proudly noted to be 650 square feet (60 m^{2}) larger than that of the court floor in Centralia at the time.) The completed project was funded by "obligation" at a cost of $1,200 (equivalent to $35,505 in 2025) and the students held fundraisers to pay down the debt. By May 1917, payments decreased the obligation by 75%.

The lack of adequate school facilities and classrooms became increasingly more urgent. By 1919, a new bond system was introduced in the city to better accommodate the raising of funds and taxes for the school district and future expansion of the school system. The two elementary schools and high schools were noted to be "crowded to the limit". The school district also noted that the deterioration of East Side School mandated a new schoolhouse be constructed within three years. Due to overcrowding, some students were taught in "portable" buildings by 1920.

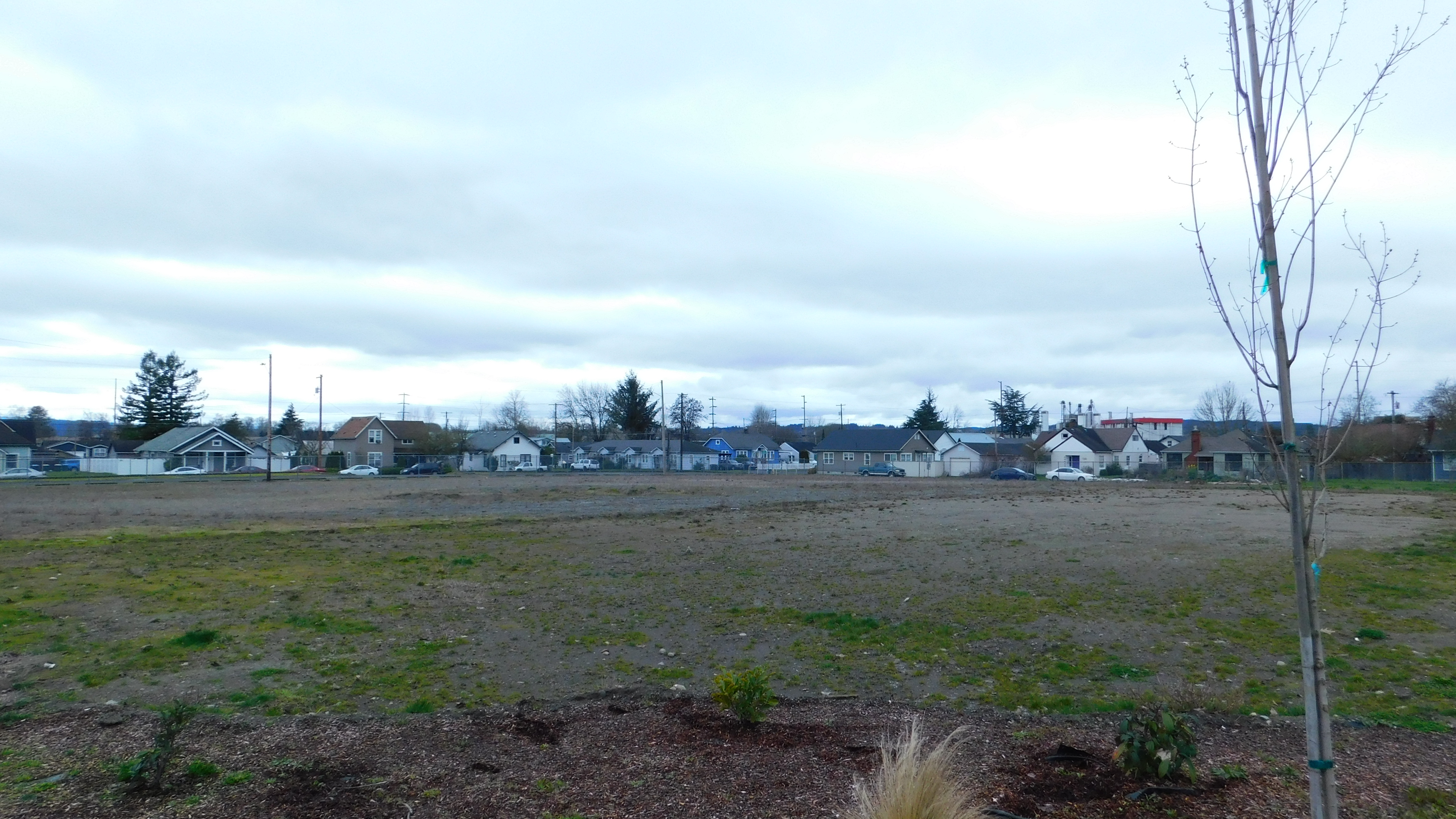
Grounds of extinct East Side School and playground, 2026

By 1921, the schoolhouse floor was noted to be unlevel, doors in the building could not close, and the plaster walls were inundated with cracks. The school, "without exaggeration", was referred to as "antiquated" and a "fire trap". Declared by the city's fire chief as a "public menace", the East Side School was condemned in May 1924; the gymnasium remained in use through the end of the year to hold practice games for local basketball clubs.

The schoolhouse was razed in 1926. The grounds of the original Cascade School were proposed by the school board for the site of a junior high school in 1927.

== History ==
=== Funding and contracts ===
With the continued issues of age, maintenance costs, and overcrowding of East Side School, a school district vote was announced in September 1920 to permit the school board to authorize a $10,000 (equivalent to $160,714 in 2025) purchase of 36 lots between the school building and Market Street (Note: At the time of the 1920 land purchase, Market Street was part of Pacific Highway, the original thoroughfare in Western Washington before the construction of Interstate 5.) that was to lead to the construction of a new Cascade School. The parcel had been used as a playground for students since the East Side building was relocated. The authorization was approved with over 84% of voters in favor of the purchase. (Note: The 1920 land purchase was paid for out of the school district's general fund. No bond was issued.) The new schoolhouse was planned to be built next to the 1916 gymnasium despite high insurance costs due to fire risks.

A bond of $68,000 (equivalent to $1,227,425 in 2025), was authorized by public vote in early April 1921 to construct the school building; (Note: The April 1921 bond was originally reported to be $70,000 (equivalent to $1,263,526 in 2025). The public voted 382 in favor with 60 opposed.) the district met with the architectural firm, Hill, Mock & Griffin, a Tacoma-based architectural firm that specialized in schoolhouse design, to begin the preliminary design phase. No bids to back the bonds were received, however, until three Chehalis banks offered to do so in June. The contract to construct the schoolhouse was awarded to Pat Manning in October 1921; his brother, Ethan, was given the contract to install the heating system. Plumbing installation was under the contract of Fred Swinth; the Manning brothers and Swinth were Chehalis contractors. Construction was noted to have been fast-paced and by February 1922, "rapidly nearing completion". By March, the school was reported to be nearly complete.

=== Construction ===
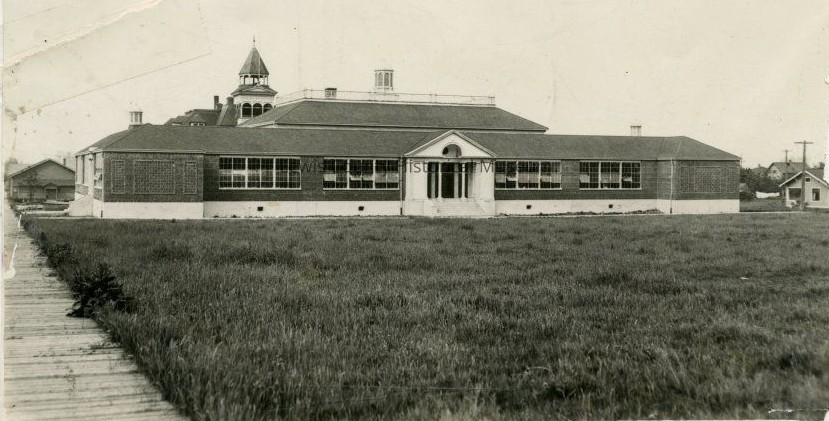
Cascade School, 1922

The quick construction led to several complaints, including cracks in the plaster walls and concerns that the building included a "waste of space". The main issue was visible cracks in the foundation wall. The cracks were listed by the architects and workers at the site as normal and were due to the "natural expansion of concrete"; the foundation was considered to be "amply heavy enough" for the weight of the schoolhouse.

The main complainant, C.H. Clark, wrote a letter to the editor to The Chehalis Bee-Nugget. In his remarks, Clark stated that he was "ashamed of the taxpayers of Chehalis" due to receiving less support than he thought necessary in his claims. Clark further mentioned that the concrete was not just cracked but pieces had "broken off" in multiple places; he referred to the concrete issue not as an expansion problem, but one of settlement. He continued to question why the foundation's footing was increased from its initial plan of 16 inches (41 cm) to 18 inches (46 cm) in width, but the 6 in (15 cm) depth remained the same. Clark listed other concerns, such as the use of wooden posts underneath the structure, and questioned the "stuff" of the project's superintendent, Harry Shern, referring to Shern as a "straw boss". The school board responded that they would "hear the matter fully" if any evidence or "expert testimony" was provided that would call into question the "safety and security of lasting qualities" of the school building.

The gymnasium, due to a lack of budgeted funds and the speed of the construction, was partially finished. The school board, reported to be "unconcerned", stated that "a wave of local sentiment" from the residents of Chehalis would eventually help to raise funds to finish the recreation room; donated funds for the gymnasium allowed for its completion by the spring season of 1923.

At the time of its completion in 1922, the Cascade School was one-floor and contained 11 rooms. Original plans were for the structure to include three more rooms but a lack of funds at the time prevented the initial efforts.

=== Opening ===
Cascade School opened on August 28, 1922 in time for the new school year and was described as the "latest thing in modern school building construction" and as "one of the most convenient and best built school houses of its class in southwest Washington"; the school was open to the public on September 15. The first principal was L.O. Cordz.

The Chehalis chapter of the Kiwanis Club, after the opening, began raising funds for a flag pole on the school grounds; the wooden pole, cut down near Chehalis, was painted and installed in late-January 1923. The portable classrooms located on the grounds were removed in August 1922 and repurposed for such at the Chehalis High School. The 1914 city ordinance regarding demarcations of school boarders and attendance, remained in place.

Cascade School was originally opened to students from first to eighth grades under the tutelage of 13 teachers. Due to the popularity of the new school, teachers were transferred from West Side School. Enrollment at Cascade School surpassed that of West Side School during the first year. The new school was credited for the "extensive" shift in the population of the city by the end of 1922, with residents and development moving to areas east and south of the downtown core of Chehalis.

The new school had been intentionally built on the parcel so that the building could be expanded at a later time. Efforts to construct concrete tennis courts on the grounds, under plans by a local Girl Scouts troop, began in March 1924.

=== Expansion ===
By late June 1924, construction was undertaken at the school for a second story, two-room addition, reported to cost $10,000, equivalent to $187,864 in 2025; the project lasted into August. Funded by a school district bond, the addition included a basement and was designed by Jacque "Jack" DeForest Griffin, previously of Hill, Mock & Griffin; the build was overseen by Chehalis contractor, E.P. Brewster. The gym's projection room, also known as the auditorium, was completed and a new heating system was installed.

Due to continued overcrowding, a second expansion of the Cascade School was begun in February 1925 with a "six mill" levy meant to raise $16,000, equivalent to $293,738 in 2025, to fund a four-room addition to the schoolhouse. The expansion, also designed by Griffin, was completed in August 1925 in time for the new school year; the project's costs were $1,000 less than the original projected budget. Small changes were made to the elementary school attendance boundaries with a slight shift more north of Main Street. The St. Helens Hotel and North Cascade Avenue became the new boundary line. The playground site was begun after the demolition of the East Side School in 1926.

All debts related to the construction and expansion of the school were paid in full by 1928.

=== School years, 1920s to 1950s ===
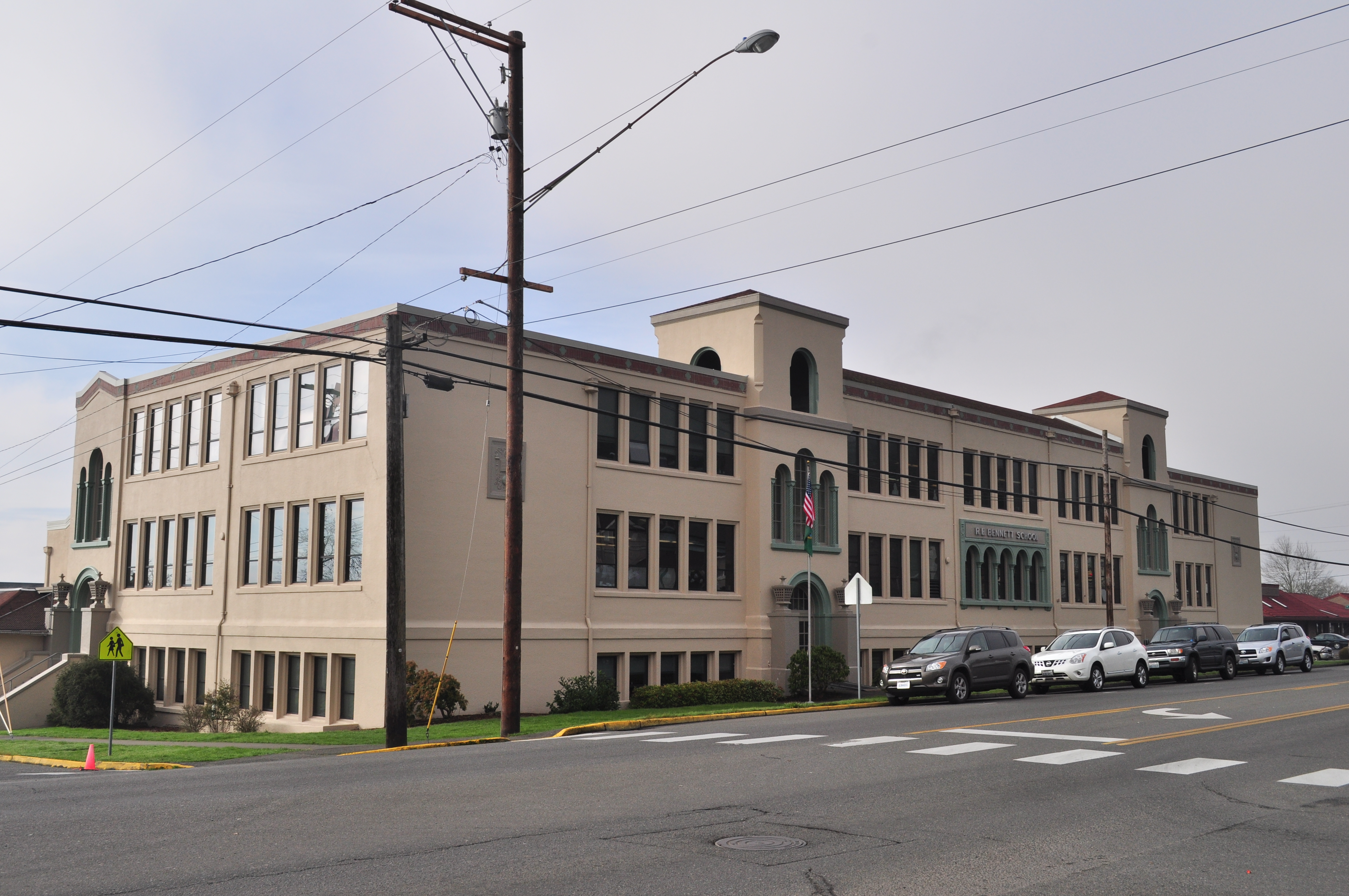
R.E. Bennett School, 2015

A student, Glen English, set a United States record during a bicycle safety event held at the school grounds in May 1925 by riding his bicycle on a 5 in (13 cm)-wide plank for 3,750 feet (1,143.0 m) without falling off. English rode the 150 foot (46 m)-long board 25 times, his run ending when the event's bike manufacturer representative had an "afternoon engagement" of a similar nature in Centralia. The young pupil received a medal and watch, both gold, for his performance.

A junior high school, later to become known as R.E. Bennett Elementary School, was first begun by the passage of a $130,000 (equivalent to $2,409,483 in 2025) bond in March 1927. The new facility, meant at the time to serve seventh through tenth grades, was to help alleviate overcrowding at the Chehalis High School. It was constructed in front of Cascade School, directly off Market Street.

A 365 ft × 244 ft (111 m × 74 m) athletic field was built behind the school beginning in April 1933. Meant for the Chehalis Bearcats football team as a replacement for Millett Field, the site also contained a 0.25-mile (0.40 km) track with a straightaway measured at 100 yards (91 m). Some of the labor was provided by elementary students of Cascade School. A portion of a Works Progress Administration (WPA) fund in 1939 went towards the purchase and installation of flood lights on the field, as well as the construction of a press box on the roof of the grandstand. The projects began in July and also included efforts to Cascade School, such as roofing and foundation repairs, and a renovation to the gymnasium. Beginning in 1941, the grounds were relandscaped during a three-year project led by the student body.

The growth of the surrounding residential neighborhood stabilized in the 1930s and the school remained mostly untouched for several decades. The 1949 Olympia earthquake caused minor damages to the school, but West Side School suffered severe damages and was condemned. Students from West Side, approximately 250, were transferred to Cascade School; the pupils were initially taught in the basement or in the gymnasium.

By the 1950s, Cascade School served first through fourth grades with R.E. Bennett providing education to students between fifth and eighth grades.

=== 1950s expansion ===
The school district became known as Chehalis School District No. 302 by 1951. Crowding continued which led to "badly needed modernization" in 1955 after a levy was passed in June of that year authorizing the renovation project. A fellow bond on the ballot meant to authorize a four-room expansion failed due to an insufficient lack of cast ballots. (Note: The minimum requirement of votes for the 1955 bond was short by 150 ballots. The measure had 935 approving the bond and 324 in opposition.) By the mid-1950s, the lunchroom was cordoned off during the day to provide two additional classrooms; another two classrooms were created in the basement, which lacked restrooms.

The 1955 levy paid for a remodeled boy's bathroom along with new lighting and the installation of acoustic ceiling tiles. The ceiling, installed by Allied Floors of Seattle, were completed by November 1955. The brickwork was repointed. The original plans were to stucco the exterior but the school board unanimously opted against the proposal. Although the costs between the options were the same, the expenditures and efforts to repaint the stucco over time was considered to be a deciding factor.

A bond was passed in January 1956 allowing for the first significant update to Cascade School since 1925. The $90,000 (equivalent to $1,065,789 in 2025) fund was used for the south wing expansion, which included four schoolrooms; the wing was constructed and completed during the summer, 1956. The expansion was designed by the firm, Mallis & De Hart Architecture. With the exception of standard maintenance and repairs, the school building remained in the same state into the late 1970s.

Early fundraising for a new playground began during the mid-1950s as the school's PTA held an annual carnival on the grounds.

Despite the 1955-1956 projects, the school continued to lack space; the kindergarten class was located in a veterans hall in 1958. A $398,000 (equivalent to $4,441,349 in 2025) school district bond was placed on the ballot in 1958. Part of the funds were to improve conditions of the high school athletic field. After the opening of W.F. West High School and adjoining sports facilities, the grounds were no longer being maintained as often. (Note: The 1958 bond measure listed several concerns for Cascade School students in terms of play. Due to the poor, muddy conditions of the athletic fields during the wet season, elementary students were crowded in the gymnasium and hallways for recreational activities. In the lead up to the vote, residents from Chehalis urged passage of the bond so that Cascade pupils could safely, and cleanly, play outside.) The bond would have funded the removal of the grandstand, replacing it with a fence. The build of a 6,000-square-foot (560 m^{2}) covered play-shed over the existing playground area was also to be part of the project. Though the bond received a majority of supporting votes, it failed to reach a 60% minimum threshold to pass.

Another bond, lowered to $350,000 (equivalent to $3,905,709 in 2025), was offered to Chehalis residents during the late-1958 voting period. The attempt failed but a bond for $536,000 (equivalent to $5,981,315 in 2025), meant to fund the construction of a new elementary school as well as cover the prior project attempts for Cascade School, was passed in May 1959. Overcrowding was alleviated with the 1960 construction of the Olympic Elementary School located in South Chehalis. The new school served 4th and 5th grades.

=== 1960s upgrades ===
During 1960, several efforts on removing the athletic fields and constructing a new playground began. The Cascade School's grandstand, built by volunteers in the 1930s, was sold. Valued at $16,000 (equivalent to $174,128 in 2025), the sale was required to make more room for the playground area. A fence around the fields was constructed and while work was undertaken to level the playing field, several workers fell into a 100 foot (30 m) hole. The anomaly was an abandoned cesspool once used for the East Side School.

In 1963, Chehalis residents were asked to vote for a one-year levy of $61,000 (equivalent to $641,495 in 2025) to fund the remodeling of bathrooms in the school; the restrooms contained toilets over four decades old. The revenue, to be split with R.E. Bennett School, was also to be used to replace furniture that originally came from the East Side and West Side schools; several pieces were dated to 1909. The levy passed and the bathrooms were redesigned by architect J.H. DeHart of Seattle. The restroom remodeling project, and furniture replacement, was begun in March 1964.

The gymnasium was remodeled in 1966. The $2,000 (equivalent to $19,846 in 2025) project included the conversion of the west balcony into a storage room and paneling for the gym walls. The school's master clock, which came from the West Side School and had been inoperable for some time, was replaced in 1967.

=== Later 20th century ===
Long-serving principal, Les Scroup, who began at Cascade School in 1939, retired at the end of the 1971 school year. Scroup, known to have "kind eyes" and was a "father and advisor" to many students, was also described as running a "tight ship". Prior pupils reported that they rarely "got away with anything".

A new roof was added in 1972, along with the installation of new boilers. Further improvements to the heating system was funded by a levy in 1973. The playgrounds were expanded and upgraded beginning in March 1975. The school's Parent Council raised $3,888 (equivalent to $23,263 in 2025) to purchase and install a "Big Toys" set made of metal, tires, and wood logs. Various local groups and organizations participated, including several students from the school who sold raffle tickets. The project was completed in May.

An analysis of both Cascade and R.E. Bennett schools was undertaken in 1976. The study, released in May, focused on the structural components as well as the electrical and mechanical components of both facilities. The report deemed the buildings as having "outlived their usefulness". The Cascade School was noted to have numerous cracks in its foundation and windows were inoperable and rotting. The chimney was considered a hazard and the analysis recommended the stack be immediately removed. Electrical, heating and venting, and fire alarm systems, as well as lighting and plumbing, were found to be inadequate or failed to meet code requirements. The roof was listed to "always be a maintenance problem". The school building, similar to prior decades, was again found to be too small for the local student population. Although the school was noted to be well-maintained by the custodial staff, the building was described as "decaying". Though noted to have a good exterior appearance, the issues were masked by "what one can't see".

By June, the Parent Council and volunteers began painting the hallways of the school. (Note: The hallway paint colors used in 1976 were listed as blue, green, orange, and yellow.) The brick chimney, reported as "cracked and damaged", was repaired beginning in August. Approximately 8 feet (2.4 m) of the chimney was removed.

In 1979, a major update to the building was undertaken. The cafeteria was upgraded, skylights were removed, and significant repairs were done to the brick and windows. Original windows were replaced with smaller panes in 1987 which led to a stucco surface around the original, inset openings.

During the 1986 flood, the basement of Cascade School was flooded.

Students at the elementary school participated in a fun run in 1996 to raise money to purchase new computers. With an original goal of $6,000 (equivalent to $12,317 in 2025), the children raised more than $14,000 (equivalent to $28,740 in 2025) which allowed all but one classroom to receive an updated computer.

By 1998, the roof and several mechanical systems were noted to have exceeded their lifespan. Bonds were placed on the ballot in 1997 and 1998 to provide funds for upgrades to the school, including seismic retrofitting and electrical and technology wiring improvements. The minimum total votes threshold was not reached during the 1997 attempt; the bond had more than the 60% requirement for passage. The 1998 bond was for $2,950,000 (equivalent to $5,827,123 in 2025), more than $500,000 less than the previous attempt. A new roof was installed in 1999.

=== 21st century and closure ===
The schoolhouse was evacuated to R.E. Bennet School during a bomb scare on Halloween, 2005. Three teenagers from Chehalis, all of whom were prior students at W.F. West High School, were arrested after they placed a fake explosive device on Second Street near the schoolhouse grounds. The hoax was part of mischief day and the device was planted on Halloween Eve. The mechanism was not discovered until the following morning.

Cascade School was temporarily closed prior to the 2008 school year for the removal of asbestos. At the time, the school hosted only classes for kindergarten and first grade, which were shifted to R.E. Bennett and Olympic schools, respectively, during the mitigation project. Students returned to Cascade in November.

The Chehalis School District announced plans in 2010 to either upgrade or replace all three elementary schools in the city. Cascade School was rated to be below a score of 60 for building quality in a feasibility study. A $27,000,000 (equivalent to $38,642,751 in 2025) bond, part of which was to be used to replace the school, failed in 2011 as the 51.9% approval did not reach the minimum 60% requirement. Cascade School was noted by the district as having outlived its "usable lifespan".

Efforts for other voter-approved bonds to fund upgrades to Cascade School began in 2013. The district reported that the building was a "priority" due to structural concerns, the need for a new boiler system, and several necessary upgrades. Chehalis resident, Gail Shaw, donated a 43-acre (17 ha) parcel to the school district in November 2014. Shaw, who was founding member of the Chehalis Industrial Commission and public servant, had died in June. His $1,900,000 (equivalent to $2,583,989 in 2025) gift was part of Shaw's final wishes for a combined elementary and middle school campus in Chehalis.

In 2015, a bond of $35,900,000 (equivalent to $48,762,109 in 2025), similar to the 2013 attempt meant to pay for the build of a new facility to replace Cascade and R.E. Bennett schools, was passed.

The Washington State Department of Health tested for lead in the drinking water at the school in 2018, finding several plumbing fixtures to contain levels as high 282 parts per billion (ppb), or more than 260ppb over the state's actionable levels and minimum replacement recommendations. The district replaced all fixtures noted to be above the minimum level by 2019.

The Port of Chehalis began the process of purchasing the grounds and buildings of Cascade and R.E. Bennett schools in 2018. As two new elementary schools, James W. Lintott and Orin Smith, were being built and completed that year on the Shaw donation property, students were already being relocated out of the older schoolhouses. By spring of 2019, only third grade classes were taught at Cascade School and no further classes held at the building by the end of the school year.

The port completed a feasibility study in 2019 outlining a potential to use Cascade School as a residential building or possibly be converted for multi-use, commercial space. The most favorable option was to demolish both schools on the 5-acre (2.0 ha) lot and rebuild a mixed-use, residential area. (Note: The lot acreage for the Cascade and R.E. Bennett schools varies depending on the source, either as 5.32 acres (2.15 ha) or 5.5 acres (2.2 ha).) The schoolhouses were officially listed for sale in 2020 and an authorization to close a sale to an unnamed buyer was agreed to by the school district, and both Bennett and Cascade school boards, in July 2021. Cascade School was originally listed for $1 million. The buyer was a two-person partnership under the business name, Market Boulevard LLC. The group purchased both schools for $1.875 million, or approximately 75% of the appraised value of the properties. The partnership had previously renovated the Brunswig Building in the city.

The schoolhouse was remodeled into a residential building and became known as the Cascade Apartments. A ribbon-cutting ceremony and tour of the facility was held in August 2025. Five apartments had been completed as well as a fitness center and game room.

== Geography ==
Cascade School, also known as Cascade Elementary School, is located in Chehalis, southeast of the Chehalis Downtown Historic District, also listed on the National Register of Historic Places (NRHP). The structure is positioned in the middle of a block between 2nd and 3rd streets. The main entrance faces east towards R.E. Bennet School and Market Boulevard; the rear of the school is to the west, situated next to a parking lot, a dismantled playground area, and Cascade Avenue. The surrounding neighborhood contains mostly homes built during the early-to-mid-20th century.

The slope of the land is slight. The grounds contain a broad, flat grass area with limited plantings around the schoolhouse. At the time of the NRHP nomination, a paved area containing a covered, rectangular play shed that was open on all sides, was reported to still be in existence.

== Architecture and features ==
Unless otherwise noted, the details provided are based on the 2026 National Register of Historic Places (NRHP) nomination form and may not reflect updates or changes to Cascade School in the interim. (Note: As of 2026, the NRHP nomination form for Cascade School has not been uploaded to the National Park Service Digital Asset Management System. The form used in the article is a digital copy supplied by the Washington State Department of Archaeology and Historic Preservation.)

The schoolhouse, noted to be of Progressive Era design, rests on a raised concrete foundation and is a U-shaped structure with a daylight basement on both the northern and southern wings. The layout was based on a "unit plan", allowing wings to be constructed for additional classrooms as needed.

The school is supported on an 18 in (46 cm) wide, 6 in (15 cm) deep foundation. Approximately 100 wooden beams, used as stilts and resting on large concrete blocks sunk 10 inches (25 cm) into the soil, were added to support the building.

=== Exterior ===
Cascade School, with several elements of Neoclassical architecture is sheathed in common bond brick manufactured in Chehalis. The building features a shallow hipped roof and boxed eaves. Originally, window casements spanned the length of each classroom.

==== East elevation ====
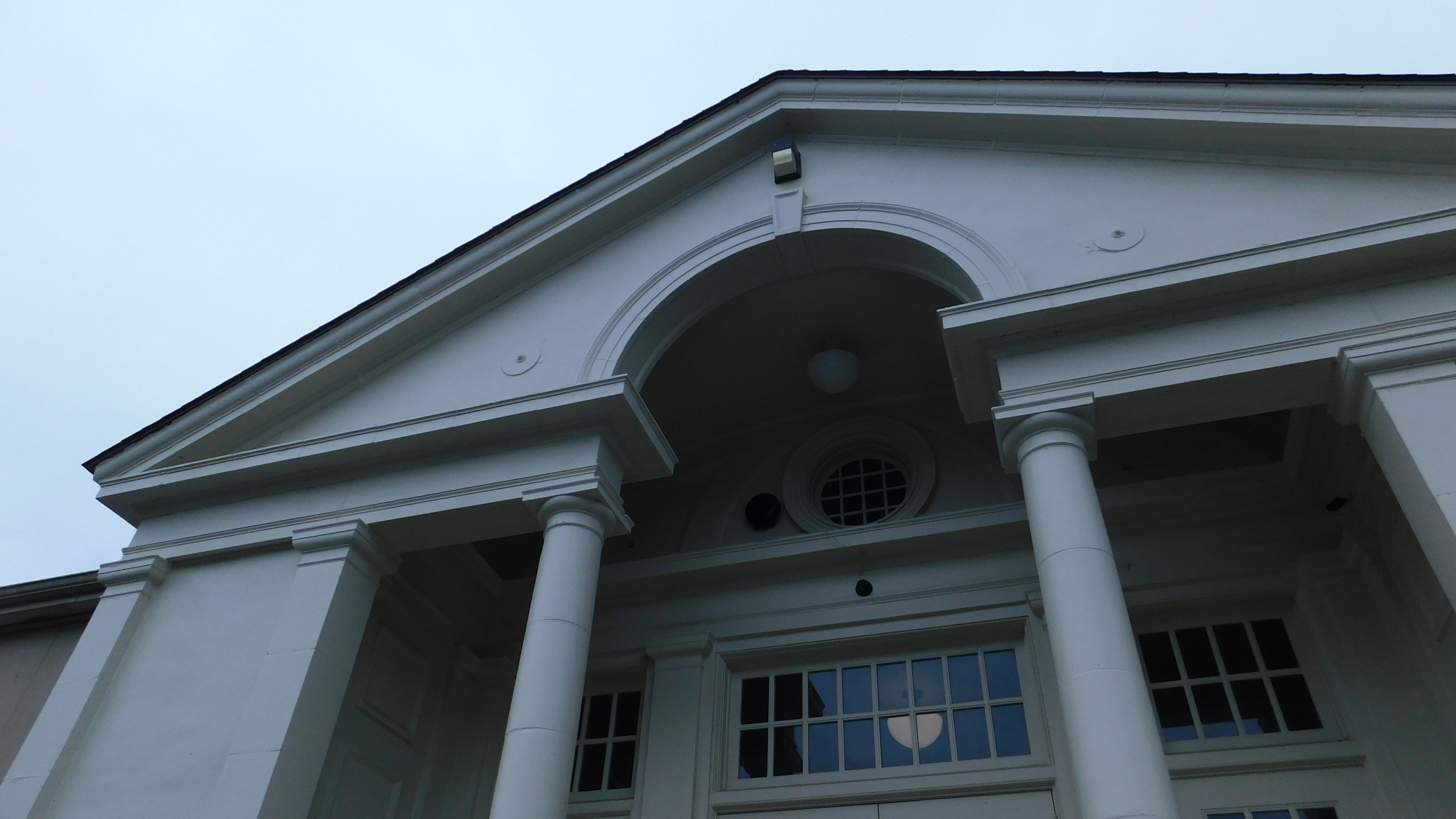
Main entrance, detail, 2026

The symmetrical, east-facing portion of the school is home to the main entrance into the building. The main feature is a tall, Classical Palladian porch with a concrete stairway. The broken pediment features a symmetrical half-circle archway arch with a plaster keystone and simple fascia supported by two Doric columns. The flanking ends of the portico are enclosed with matching pilasters. Additional pilasters also separate the doorways, which contain multi-panel transoms. A round, multi-light transom window is situated above the door transoms, mirroring two circle details in the pediment.

Two bays of modern windows, with concrete sills and inset stucco panels, are situated on each side of the entrance. The wings of the schoolhouse begin from the window bays and feature a hipped roof and basketweave brick work. Basement windows are partially visible from a smooth concrete course. The school's flag pole is located outside, and immediately to the right, of the main entrance.

==== North elevation ====
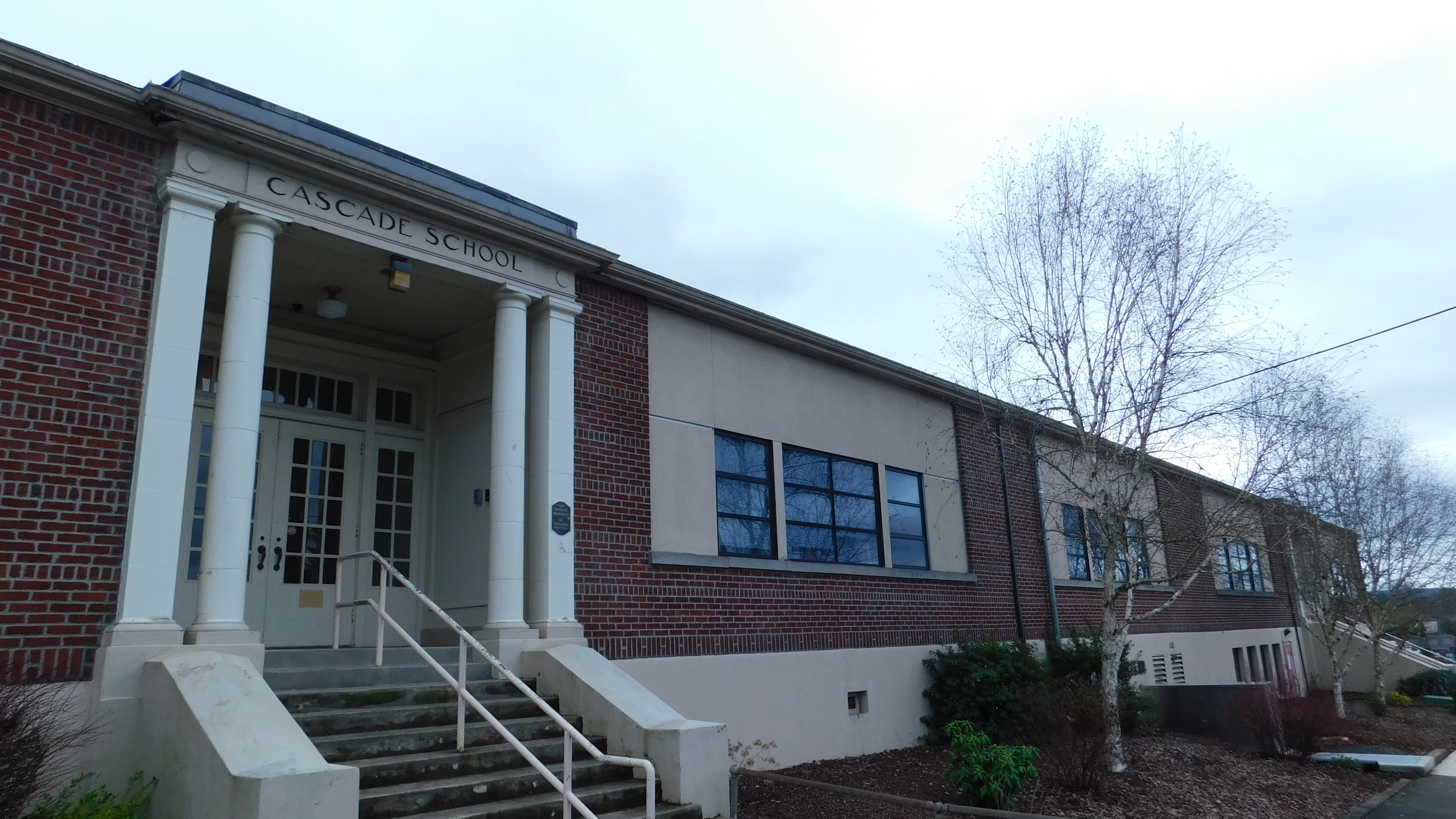
North wing, 2026

Bordering 2nd Street, the northern wing of Cascade School includes five bays within a brick exterior cladding over a concrete basement course. Featuring two entrances, the inset eastern doorway has a cornice with the Cascade School etched within. Doors, pilasters, and windows also match. The western entrance slightly differs from the matching doorway of the south wing. Reached by a short concrete stairwell, the doorway features an unadorned cornice and frieze with flanked pilasters. The recessed porch features board-and-batten wainscotting. Doors, sidelights, and transoms are of the same style seen throughout the exterior of the schoolhouse.

The elevation change on the north elevation allows for larger basement windows, including four additional windows to the left of the western stairway. The additional fenestrations align with windows in the above stucco bay. A door to the basement exists between the stairwells.

==== South elevation ====
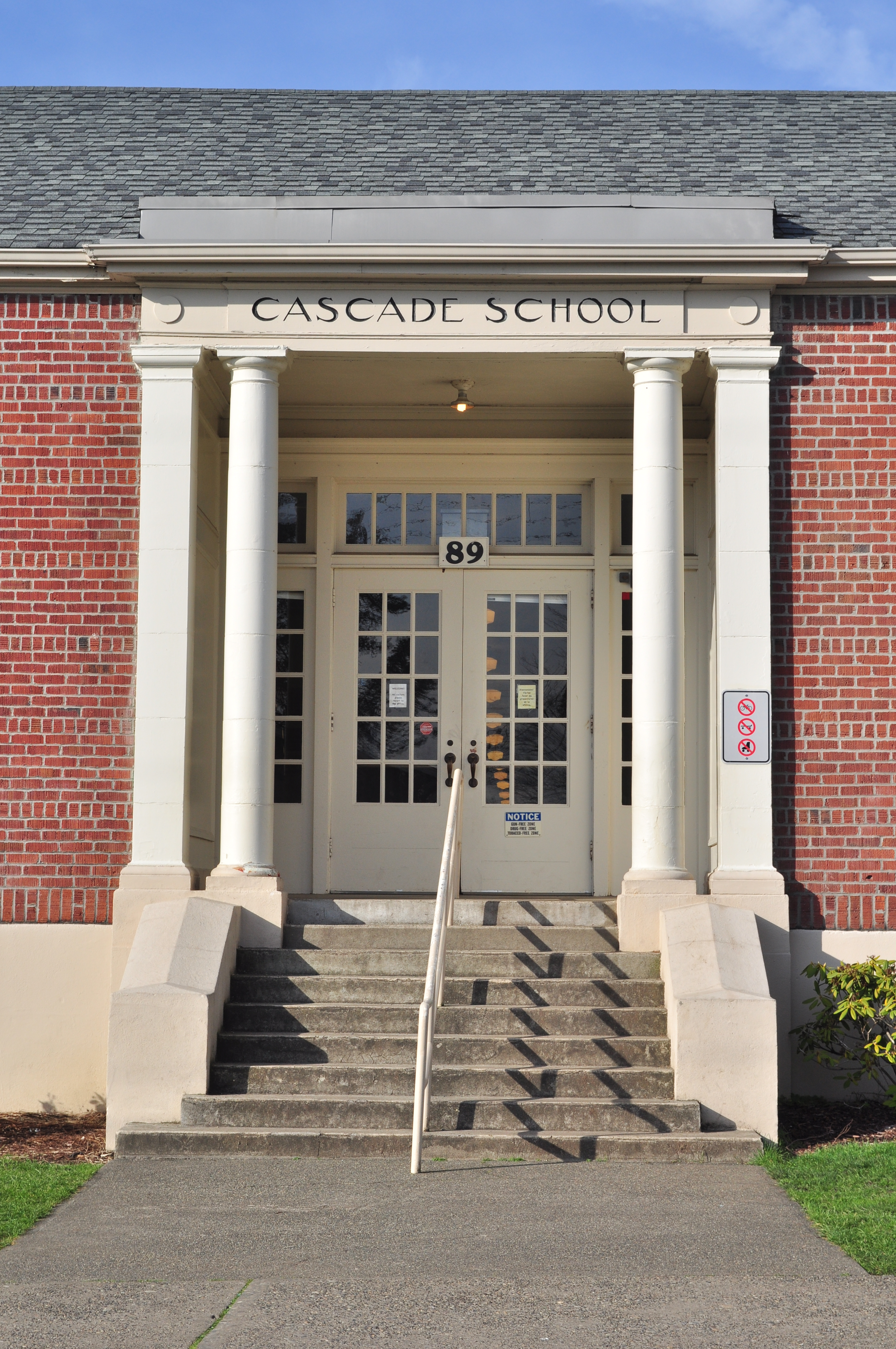
South wing entrance, 2015

Located towards 3rd Street, the southern wing is similar to that of the north elevation, featuring five bays and two entrances. The recessed entrance to the east contains a small stairway and cheek walls. Matching pilasters and columns flank the porch. A cornice is etched with the name, Cascade School. Panel details, sidelights, and a double-door featuring multi-panel windows and a transom are features of the porch area. The recessed west entryway, part of an addition, lacks columns, pilasters, and a cornice. A simple spandrel tops the entrance and painted furring strips adorn the ceiling. A transom rests above the paired doors, which feature less windows.

Between the third and fourth bay is a noticeable change in the color of the brick, signifying the beginning of the addition to the wing. The final bay is also larger than the other inset bays on the south elevation. With the exception of two windows at the western-most portion, the basement course has no openings.

==== West elevation ====
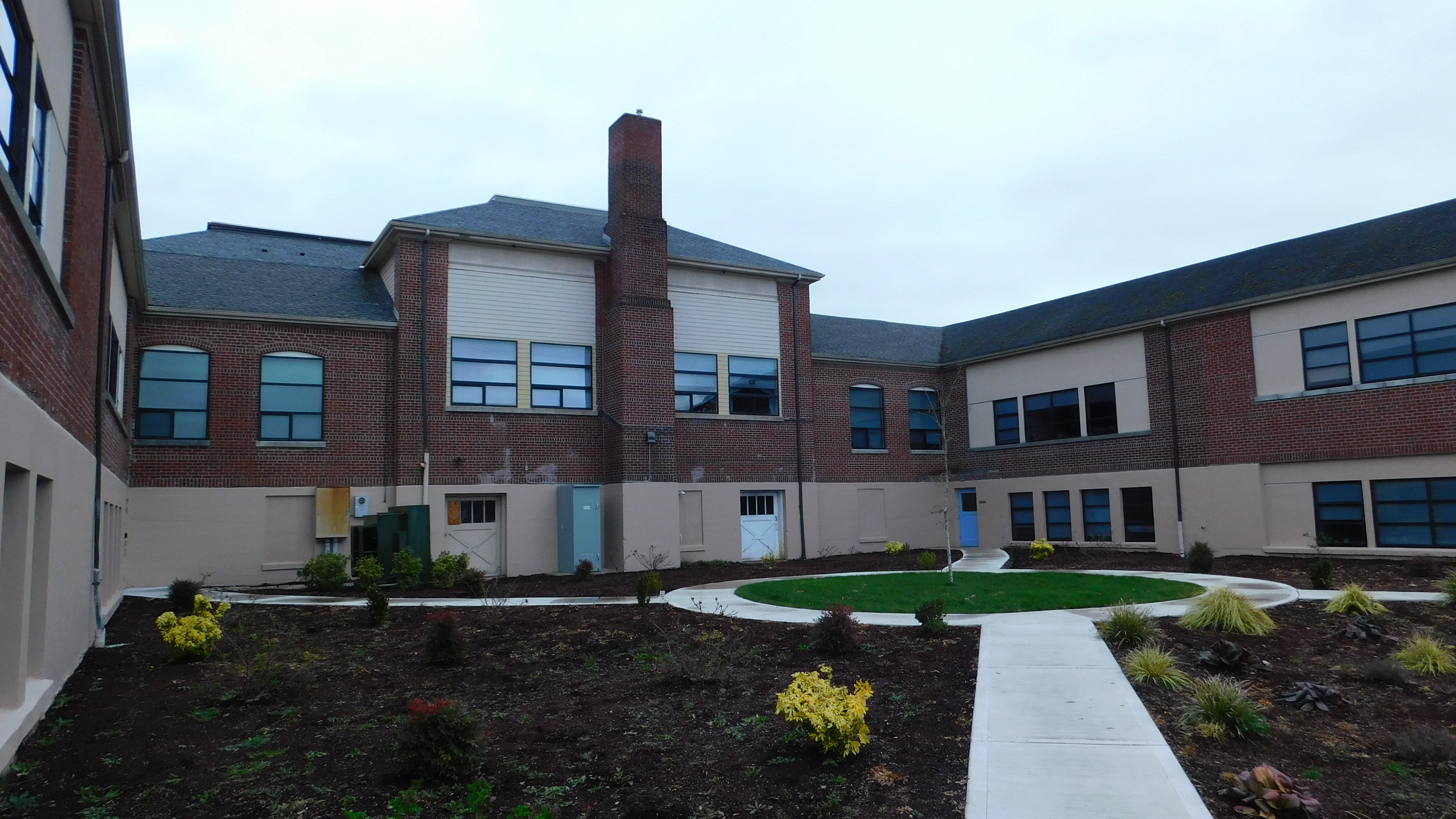
Courtyard, 2026

The rear of the schoolhouse, facing west where the school's paved playground once stood, is marked by a central courtyard between the two wings. The brick and basement concrete courses continue but the brickwork is laid in running bond. The basement, fully visible, is accessed via a centralized door on both wing ends; a window sits above each entrance and was once protected with an awning. The window on the south wing is larger, denoting the section as an addition. The courtyard-facing extensions have a matching set of two stucco bays that include windows and concrete sills similar to the rest of the school building. Windows for the basement line up with the above window bays, with a slight discrepancy in window sizing at the far corner of the south wing. The corner also contains a basement access door.

The middle block contains a centralized chimney, located in a protruding addition topped with a gable roof. A pair of doors with ribbon windows flank the chimney at the basement level; matching, rectangular wood openings are situated further apart. A pair of arched windows with granite sills are located to the left and right on the original main floor. Inset in brick, these differ from the standard stucco bays on the school.

=== Interior ===
==== Balcony ====
A balcony level is situated above the school's gymnasium. Accessed by a main hallway stairwell, with a projection room located between, the balcony area features wood benches. The seating area is located on the eastern portion and overlooks the gym floor. The section is open with a half-wall and pipe railing enclosure. The north section, a meeting space known as the Rainbow Room, and the south balcony, once the staff lunch room, are similar in layout and are fully enclosed.

==== Basement ====
The basement's footprint generally follows that of the first floor but differs in height depending on location in the space. The eastern portion is considered a crawl space. Rooms for the boiler and mechanicals, as well as storage, are located below the first floor stage. A lunchroom, kitchen, and additional storage rooms are located in the exterior-accessible north wing. The space in the south basement section is made up of four classrooms accessed by a short corridor. The classrooms, as well as most of the basement area, is styled similarly to that of the first floor, with acoustic tile ceilings and vinyl floors.

==== First floor ====
The interior is accessed via five entrances, including two on both wings and the main doorway on the east elevation. The gymnasium is centered in the U-shaped footprint of the floor.

The main entry features a vestibule with an arched opening supported by pilasters; the central arch opens into an arched hallway that leads to the gymnasium and the first floor classroom corridors. The flanking arches of the vestibule lead to stairs that access the balcony level. The arched hallway is short in length and contains "deep baseboards" and trim, with an area on the south wall containing ledges and hooks.

The main corridor off the east vestibule runs north-to-south and contains a vaulted ceiling with simple, schoolhouse lights, pilasters, and arched details in the section. The ceilings and walls become flat at the entrances to the wings of the school. Ledges and hooks located outside of classrooms were noted. The south wing hallway slopes upward; stairs at the end of the corridor are used to access the basement level. Walls in both classroom hallways are smooth with simple wainscotting; floors are linoleum.

Classrooms are arranged on opposite sides from one another, split by the "double-loaded" corridor. Doors to the rooms are wood, with "half-lite" windows and decorative trim. The classrooms are noted to be similar in layout and style. Corkboards span the length of the room with a chalkboard near the doorway. A set of 1950s-installed cabinets, with a small sink and closet, sit on the opposite wall of the chalkboard. The floor is carpeted and ceilings contain acoustic panels. A small amount beadboard panelling exist in some classroom entryways and closets.

==== Gymnasium ====
The gymnasium, centered in the school building's first floor, can be accessed from the main corridor and both classrooms wings. The ceiling height is approximately twice that of the rest of the first floor. The space features a stage and a balcony level.

Also known as a multi-purpose room, the central space's main feature is a polished maple floor. Basketball hoops are hung at both ends. Exposed beams, metal lights, and acoustic tiles make up the ceiling. Wood panel wainscotting is affixed to the walls, with padded walls added behind the basketball hoop sections.

Horizontal slide windows are located on the west-facing wall above the space. Similar to the rest of the school building, the ceiling contains acoustic tiles.

A recessed, elevated stage is located in the west section of the gym. Original, multi-panel sliding doors are used to hide the stage when not in use. A short stairway at the back of platform provides access to both the stage and to rooms located in the balcony. The stage floor is vinyl and a bookcase, wood shelves, and a storage closet are located behind the rostrum. Administrative offices and restrooms, as well as other office spaces that have been partitioned in the past, are located on the north and south sections of the gym; the spaces are accessed from the corridors.

=== Extinct features ===
A bell tower, situated on a balustrade roof with lanterns, was noted to have been part of the original construction of the school in 1922. At the time of the NRHP nomination, a wood-frame accessibility ramp was located on the southeast portion of the front entrance. An "old, green rail fence" was noted to have been removed from the grounds during the 1940s landscaping project.

=== Non-contributing property ===
The covered play shed, once located west of the rear of the school building, was considered by the NRHP nomination to be a non-contributing property to the historic designation of Cascade School. The open-air, steel-framed shed had a gable-style roof. Four basketball hoops were affixed to the inside of the structure. (Note: The NRHP form does not mention a reason for the play shed's exclusion under the nomination.)

=== Renovations and restorations ===
The 1955 upgrade project, which concluded in 1956, focused on the installation of asphalt or vinyl tile flooring and the remodeling of two bathrooms. Cabinets, closets, and sinks were either added or renovated in each classroom in 1955. The following year, new lighting and acoustic tile ceilings were installed and both the interior and exterior were painted.

Three major additions to expand Cascade School were undertaken. Two classrooms were added in 1924. The north wing was completed in 1925 and included four classrooms, a lunchroom and kitchen, and a continuation of the basement. The south wing was completed in 1956. Additional exterior changes include the replacement of smaller windows in 1987. The effort also led to the inclusion of the stucco bays; the original sills remained. Since the 1980s, Cascade School is noted to have had limited modifications to the exterior of the structure.

Changes to the interior include the removal of a balustrade at the parapet of the balcony, reported to have been done in the 1950s. A central cupola, and one each at the wings, were removed at some point after 1956 but before 1978. In 1978, updates were made to the basement kitchen. Any additional improvements to the interior since the late 1970s have been limited to new carpeting or finishes.

== Education ==
The students formed a junior-level Audubon Society club prior to the 1925 school year with a beginning membership totaling 125.

The county began an education program for children with emotional or physical disabilities in 1941. Most of the classes, ungraded and supervised by a large group of teachers, were held at Cascade School by the 1950s. Classes for children between six and 18 years of age included art, music, and remedial education, as well as vocational education, such as cooking, sewing, and woodworking courses.

== Significance ==
Cascade School was listed to the Washington State Heritage Register on September 23, 2025 and to the National Register of Historic Places (NRHP) on February 5, 2026. Limited alterations to both the exterior and interior of the school were such that the NRHP nomination noted the building to retain a "high degree of integrity" as well as its "historic character".
