= Barbara Feigin =

American businesswoman (born 1937)

- Born: Barbara Sommer; 1937 (age 88–89); Berlin, Germany
- Education: W.F. West High School, Whitman College
- Occupations: Advertising and marketing executive
- Spouse: Jim Feigin (m. 1961)
- Children: 3

Barbara Feigin is an advertising executive and World War II refugee. She worked for several ad companies, gaining rights for maternity leave as well as career advancement regardless of her gender, while running strategic planning and market research campaigns. Feigin led efforts to create the teenage drunk driving advertisement, Friends don't let friends drive drunk. She is recognized as the first woman to be a major advertising executive in the United States.

== Personal life ==
Feigin was born in Germany in 1937 to a Jewish father, Eric Sommer, and Lutheran mother, Charlotte, during the rise of the Nazi movement. In July 1940, at the age of two, Feigin and her family escaped from the country, at first via Italy, but then traveling by rail over Europe and Asia towards Japan. Her family crossed the Pacific Ocean, arriving in Seattle on August 4, 1940. They settled soon thereafter in Chehalis, Washington. After graduating from W.F. West High School in 1955, she attended and graduated from Whitman College in Walla Walla. Due to women at the time disallowed from attending Harvard University, Feigin instead entered a joint business administration program run by Harvard and Radcliffe. Despite the program providing the same education as available to enrolled men, she received a certificate rather than an MBA degree.

Feigin married her husband, Jim, in 1961 and had three sons, two of whom are identical twins. Her son, Peter, has been president of the Milwaukee Bucks since 2014, including during the 2021 championship season. After her husband suffered two strokes early in their marriage, she became his full-time caregiver.

== Professional career ==
After college, Feigin began her 30-year career in advertising and marketing, first working as a market researcher for Vicks Chemical Company. She left the company after being denied career advancement due to her gender. Feigin entered the advertising field afterwards with Benton & Bowles and was able to procure maternity leave for herself after first being rejected. She was employed by Grey Advertising, known as Grey Global Group, working as a strategic planning executive which included research of consumer attitudes. She became an executive vice-president by 1989 and was the only woman on a Grey policy council. Feigin was honored as a Legendary Pioneer with Grey and was inducted into the Market Research Hall of Fame.

Feigin was part of the team that created advertising campaigns for cosmetic companies CoverGirl and Revlon, as well as the Kool-Aid brand. She also worked on the early National Highway Traffic Safety Administration (NHTSA) marketing to lessen deaths from teenage drunk driving. The efforts led to the Friends don't let friends drive drunk advertisements.

Feigin has been recognized as the first woman to be a major advertising executive in the United States.

== Author ==
Feigin wrote a book based on her life, detailing her family's escape from Nazi Germany, using details from a journal her father wrote during the ordeal. The memoir, My American Dream: A Journey from Fascism to Freedom, was self-published in 2021 and rereleased in 2024, and contains the full writings of her father's journal.

== Philanthropy ==
Feigin is a contributing benefactor to the Chehalis Foundation which provides educational and scholarship opportunities for students in Chehalis. She is also a Whitman College trustee, and has overseen several organizations, including the Advertising Research Foundation and Whitman's Governance Committee.

== Bibliography ==
- Feigin, Barbara (2024). My American Dream: A Journey from Fascism to Freedom. Five Star Press. ISBN 9798988626114.
