= Dave Nisbet =

American football player (1910–1976)

Profile
- Position: End

Personal information
- Born: August 29, 1910; Chimacum, Washington, U.S.
- Died: December 10, 1976 (aged 66); Tucson, Arizona, U.S.
- Listed height: 6 ft 1 in (1.85 m)
- Listed weight: 190 lb (86 kg)

Career information
- High school: Chehalis (WA)
- College: Washington

Career history
- Chicago Cardinals (1933)

Awards and highlights
- First-team All-American (1932); First-team All-PCC (1932)

Career statistics
- Games: 10
- Receiving yards: 25
- Passing yards: 36

David McLean Nisbet (August 29, 1910 – December 10, 1976) was an American football player. Nisbet attended Chehalis High School in Chehalis, Washington. He played college football at Centralia College from 1929 to 1930, and then at the University of Washington. Nicknamed "Snakebite" because of two small punctures on his leg that looked like a snakebite. Wore uniform numbers 49 (1930), 55-56 (1931) and 56 (1932). He lettered for the school from 1930 to 1932. He was selected by both Collier's Weekly (Grantland Rice) and Liberty magazine as a first-team end on the 1932 College Football All-America Team. He was selected a second-team All-American in 1931. Made National Champion USC's All-Opponent Team in 1931. Caught only one pass in his collegiate career, but it was for a TD in a 9–6 loss to USC in 1932. Outstanding blocker and defensive player and a specialist at blocking punts. In 1933, he played in East-West All-Star Game in Chicago and blocked two punts in the game, one of which he returned 35 yards for a touchdown. He also played professional football as an end in the National Football League for the Chicago Cardinals in 1933. His rookie season he played in all 10 games and started 6 games for the 1-9-1 Cardinals whose only victory that season was a 3–0 defeat of the Cincinnati Reds. The only other highlight was a 0–0 tie vs. the Boston Redskins. His stats included 3 passes and 1 completion for 36 yards. He also had one reception for 25 yards. Opponents in the 1933 season included future NFL Hall of Famers Red Grange and Bronko Nagurski of the cross-town rival Chicago Bears. Head coaching adversaries included the legendary George Halas of the Bears and Curly Lambeau of the Green Bay Packers. Nisbet was selected to University of Washington All-Time Team in 1950 (3rd highest vote getter) and Husky Athletic Hall of Fame in 1988.
