= Chehalis School District =

American public school district in Washington state

Chehalis School District No. 302

Address
- 310 SW 16th Street Chehalis, Lewis, Washington, 98532
- Coordinates: 46°39′4″N 122°57′1″W

District information
- Grades: Pre-K through 12
- Superintendent: Rick Goble
- Deputy superintendent(s): Dr. Brian D. Fox
- Schools: 6
- Budget: $46,843,371
- NCES District ID: 5301170

Students and staff
- Students: 3,259
- Teachers: 167
- Staff: 77
- Student–teacher ratio: 17.92
- District mascot: Bearcats

Other information
- Website: chehalisschools.org

Chehalis School District No. 302 is a public school district in Lewis County, Washington, United States, and serves the city of Chehalis. Chehalis is on the I-5 corridor, halfway between Seattle, Washington, and Portland, Oregon.

== History ==
One of the first schools in the district was the East Side School, a high school located near the downtown core. In 1908, due to inadequate facilities and concerns of its location, the building was sold and was used for a time as a city hall.

By the early 1910s, the schools in Chehalis School District No. 3, particularly the South Ward and West Side schools, were considered overcrowded and the city began to form ideas to construct new school buildings. During this time, students were required to attend certain schools based on neighborhood locations in relation to the railroad tracks that crossed the city, due to concerns over the dangers of walking over the railways.

The previous primary schools, Cascade (built 1922), R.E. Bennet (opened 1928), and Olympic (built 1960) were replaced by new elementary schools which were built simultaneously in 2018 and fully opened to all students in 2019.

Due to age and structural issues in and outside of both Cascade and R.E. Bennet, the school district first proposed a bond measure to fund replacing Cascade and modernizing R.E. Bennett in 2011. The measure, tallying less than 53% of the vote, failed to pass due to a lack of a supermajority. In 2014, Chehalis resident Gail Shaw betrothed the district with 43 acres (17 ha) near Chehalis Middle School. Valued at $1.9 million, the land was meant to be used as the location of a new school to replace Cascade Elementary.

By February 2015, Chehalis voters, by a 62% margin, approved a $35.9 million bond for the schools. The following year, the school board voted to name the two new elementary schools that replaced R.E. Bennett, Cascade and Olympic in honor of James W. Lintott and Orin C. Smith. The campus was named for the Shaw family.

=== Superintendents ===
Prior superintendents include Ed Rothlin, who retired in 2020, followed by Dr. Christine Moloney, serving through the end of the 2023-2024 school year. Moloney's salary in her last two years was more than any other state school district employee during that time. Rick Goble, after a period as acting head of the district, became an official superintendent in 2025.

== Schools ==
=== High schools ===
- W. F. West High School

=== Middle Schools ===
The only intermediate facility in the city is Chehalis Middle School. The school mascot is the Wildcat, represented by the colors black, blue, gray, and white.

=== Elementary schools ===
In October 2026, the bronze sculpture, Monumental Boy and Girl on Globe, was officially unveiled. Donated by a group of three Chehalis families, the artwork is located in a landscaped area within the shared parking lot. The piece was commissioned as a dedication to the students of both elementary schools.

==== James W. Lintott Elementary ====
Open for pre-kindergarten to 2nd grade. The school mascot is the Bobcats, represented by the colors crimson and gray, matching the district's color scheme.

==== Orin C. Smith Elementary School ====
Opened in 2019 for students between the 3rd and 5th grades, the school was named for Orin Smith, former CEO of Starbucks, who made significant financial contributions to Chehalis, Washington education system. During the 2023–24 school year, there were 47 teachers on staff, with 659 enrolled students. The student population met Washington state standards of 55.8% for science, 49.1% for English language arts and a 47.5% rate for math.

The school mascot is the Cougar, represented by the colors crimson and gray, similar to the high school.

=== Special schools and educational programs ===
- Green Hill School
- Lewis County Juvenile Detention Center
- Turning Point/Lewis County Alternative School
- VISIONS

== Extinct schools ==
=== Cascade, Olympic, and R.E. Bennett elementary schools ===
Prior to the construction of the Lintott and Smith elementary schools, elementary students in the public school system in Chehalis attended Cascade Elementary School for kindergarten and first grade, R.E. Bennett Elementary School for second and third grades, and Olympic Elementary School for fourth and fifth grades. Both the Bennett and Cascade schools were designed by Jacque “Jack” DeForest Griffin, an influential architect in 1920s Chehalis, specifically in the Chehalis Downtown Historic District.

The Olympic School was given its moniker officially in June 1960, intentionally named after the Olympic Mountains. The school building was constructed during 1960 at a cost of over $258,000 (equivalent to $2,807,818 in 2025) and originally contained eight classrooms, a gymnasium and multi-purpose room, and a library.

Cascade Elementary School was converted into an apartment building and opened as such in 2025. The structure, located on Second Street, was added to the Washington State Heritage Register in October 2025. The school was listed on the National Register of Historic Places in 2026.

The R.E. Bennett school building and property was sold for over $2.3 million in August 2026 to a Centralia church organization. The property, along with Cascade, had previously been sold in 2021 for $1.87 million. The auditorium, which has a 850-seat capacity, is to be converted into a chapel and the church organization immediately began remodeling and maintenance projects to open the school for the 2026-2027 year. As of 2026, the schoolhouse is used as a private Christian school for grades kindergarten through 12th grade.

=== Chehalis High School ===
The boys' basketball team won the 1922 state title when the team for Toppenish High School conceded the championship to Chehalis without playing the final game.

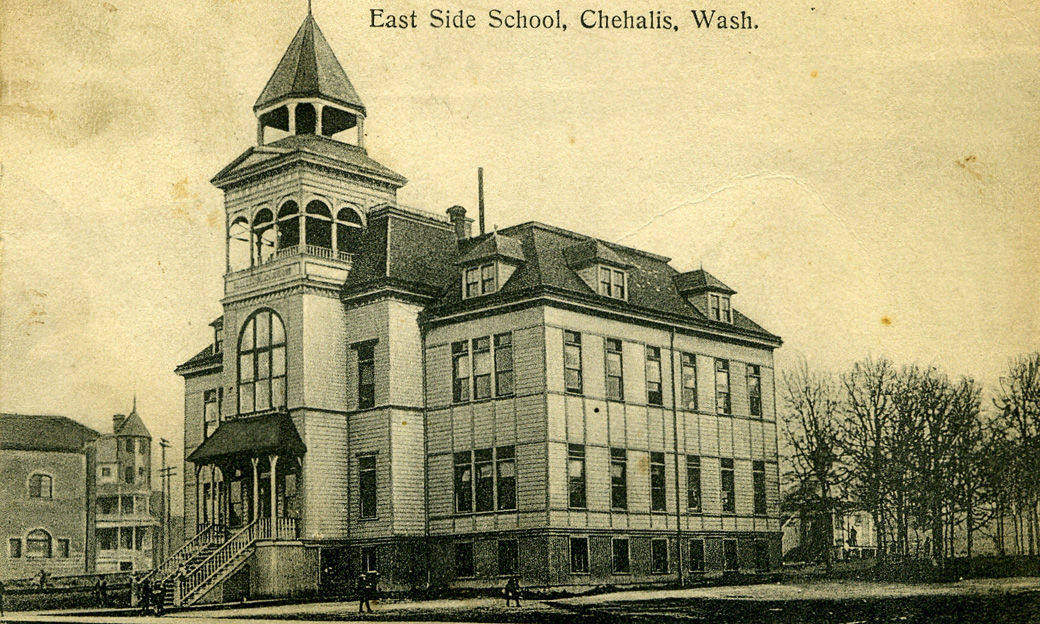
East Side School, 1900s

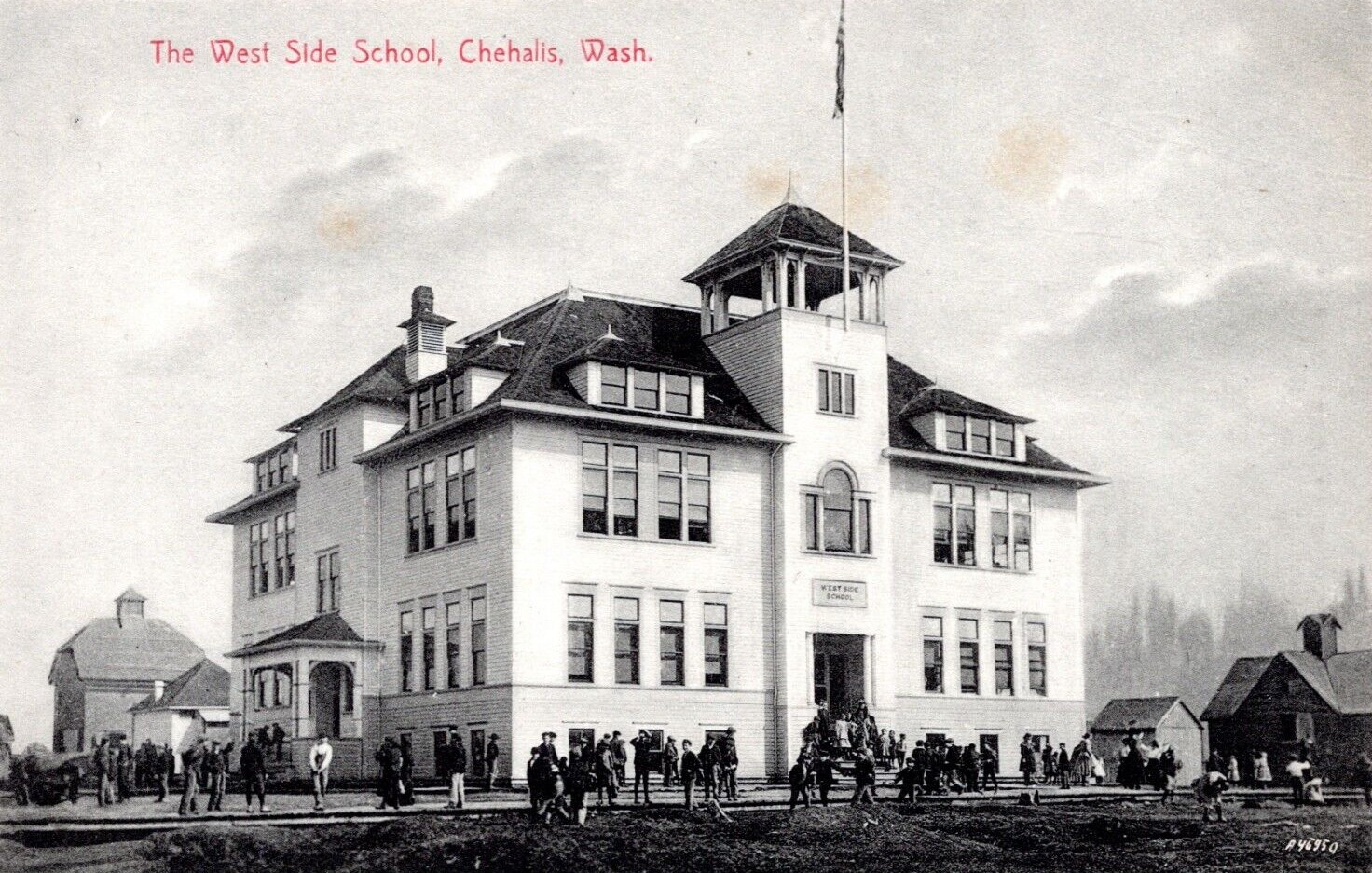
West Side School, pre-1910

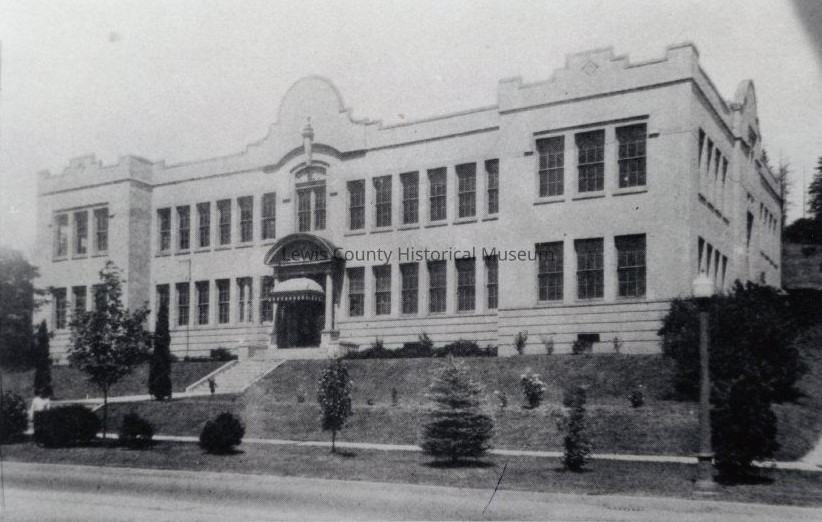
Chehalis High School, circa 1927

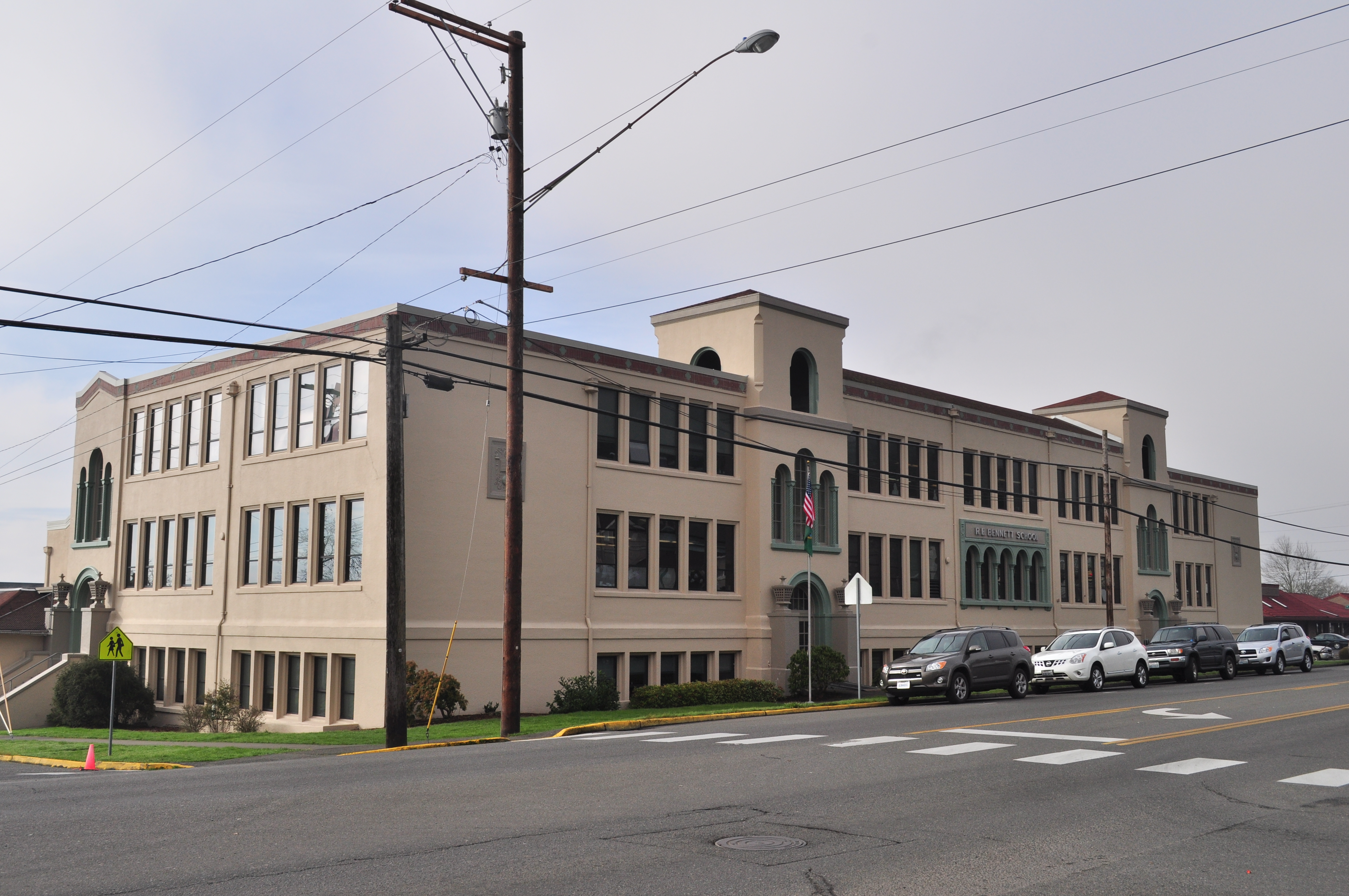
R.E. Bennett School, 2015

== Enrollment and graduation rates ==
In November 2006, the district had an enrollment of 2,596 students., and 2,791 students in a May 2015 report. The Chehalis School District reported an enrollment of 3,053 students in 2018, with a trend of slightly lower numbers following a register of 3,027 students in 2020 and 2,987 in 2023.

Based on a study initiated by the district, it was reported that only 20% of Chehalis students in the early 2010s were achieving a 4-year college degree. The CSD implemented a plan in 2013–2014, referred to as the Student Achievement Initiative (SAI), that within 8 years of graduating, 60% of the students would receive a degree or certification from a technical training program or college. To achieve the goal, all seniors in high school were to submit an application for acceptance to Centralia College. Coupled with field trips to Centralia College, this allowed the district to achieve high rates of graduation, college admission, and career opportunities for the students. Officials and teachers in elementary and middle schools created programs to emphasize future college and employment opportunities by holding job assemblies, "swag days" for local and state schools of technical and university education, and "college-themed days". In its first three years, the SAI improved the rate of students eligible for a four-year college by 8 percentage points.

The district, achieving the SAI goal before 2022, initiated a program known as "75 by 35". The expanded efforts were to reach a level of 75% of graduates achieving a postgraduate degree that would provide a living wage and to do so by 2035. The overall education efforts to prepare students for graduation and be accepted into college, military service, or technical training was thought to be the only such type in the state and a rarity in the United States.

The graduation rate for students at W.F. West High School in 2010 was 77%, with 33% of those students achieving admission into a university or training school/ In 2018, 73% of seniors who graduated went on to further higher education. A six-year stretch began in 2019 in which 100% of all graduating senior classes were accepted into college. In 2019, the four-year graduation rate was 95%, bettering the state average by 14 points. The rate increased to 96% in 2022.

=== Student population ===
A Civil Rights Data Collection report from the Department of Education for the district's 2020–2021 school year listed that over 70% of the student body was classified as being White, almost 21% as Latino or of Hispanic heritage, less than 2% were Black students, and below 1% each for Native American, Pacific Islander, and Asian enrollees. Less than 3% of pupils were held back a grade and no reports of bullying, harassment, or students with disabilities being restrained. The report also states that there is one counselor for every 444 students. The collection for the district, which begins in 2011, has shown a slight but noticeable increase in inclusivity and lower ratios of students to staff.

== Education programs ==
The CSD offers an education program, known as VISIONS, for students with various disabilities between the ages of 18 and 21. The program, begun in the early 1990s, is considered an extension of the high school curriculum and provides continuing education and experiences so that participants can be better equipped for independence in adulthood. Operating under the district, it partners with school districts in the county as well as other educational projects and initiatives. The students officially receive their high school diploma at completion of the program. Students are given vocational training which includes education on social interactions, employment and job tasks, and practical living skills. The VISIONS program partners with staffing services to provide students, both enrolled and graduated, a match with local jobs and living facilities best suited for them.

The district began the Cornerstone Program in 2023 to provide parents and young students, particularly pre-kindergarten, resources to better prepare for early education. The program was additionally developed to increase early skills proficiency in a variety of measures and to better connect families to school staff, procedures, and community support as their children transition to school.

== Budget and funding ==
=== Budget ===
As part of Chehalis School District financial policy, a minimum 5% equivalency of the district's budget is required to be maintained in the general fund. The requirement was imposed by the district and is not a state mandate; the requisite's purpose is to protect funding of the district and maintain employment in times of financial hardship. As of 2025, the fund's minimum balance was required to be over $2.9 million. Approximately 83% of the budget is spent on personnel, including teachers and employees of the district.

=== Funding ===
The SAI was originally funded by donations from the community via the Chehalis Foundation. It included several large contributions made by hometown citizens of note, and a $10 million contribution from Orin C. Smith, who graduated from the high school in 1960. Originally, the early funding was meant for scholarships, but concerns that college assistance was not enough, the foundation and the SAI turned to a more comprehensive plan to prepare students for college based on education, experience, and preparedness. The fund is perpetual, and is able to pay out $500,000 per year.

The district, in 2022, was awarded a grant of over $1,000,000 from the Washington Student Achievement Council. The funds are to be used to reach out to parents and young children, particularly at-risk students.

Funding for Green Hill School is provided in full by the state of Washington.
