= Brock Peterson =

American baseball player (born 1983)

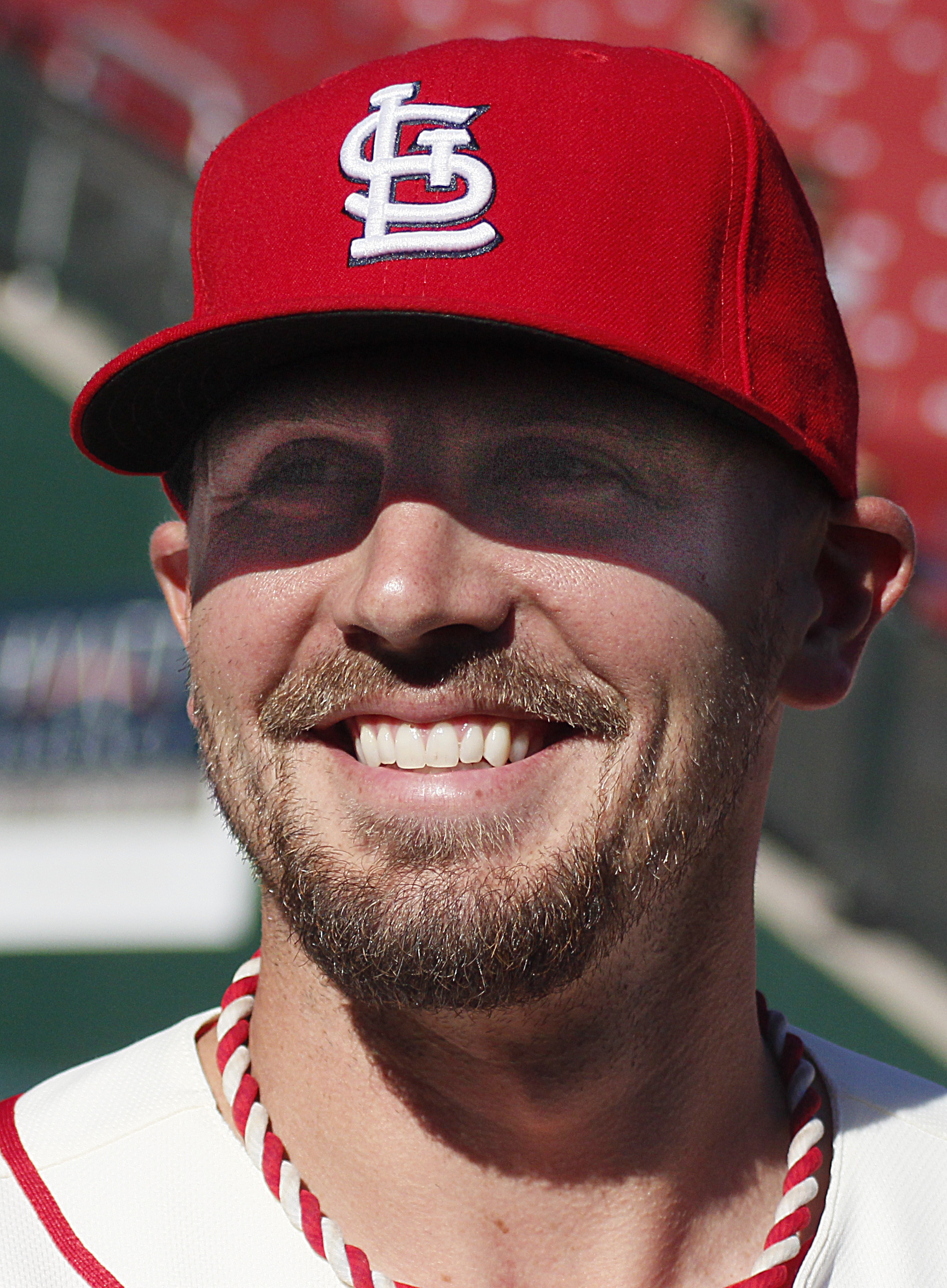
- Peterson with the St. Louis Cardinals
- First baseman
- Born: November 20, 1983 (age 42); Centralia, Washington, U.S.
- Batted: Right Threw: Right

debut
- July 20, 2013, for the St. Louis Cardinals

Last appearance
- September 29, 2013, for the St. Louis Cardinals

Career statistics
- Batting average: .077
- Home runs: 0
- Runs batted in: 2
- Stats at Baseball Reference

Teams
- St. Louis Cardinals (2013)

Brock Alan Peterson (born November 20, 1983) is an American former professional baseball first baseman. He played in Major League Baseball (MLB) for the St. Louis Cardinals.

== Early life ==
During his childhood, Peterson played sandlot ball in his hometown of Chehalis, Washington and was considered a multi-sport athlete, participating in snowboarding, football, and wrestling. His favorite sport was basketball. Although he received some college interest in football at the end of his high school days, Peterson chose baseball after large improvements to his talents on the diamond. He was noticed by a former baseball scout, Bill Lohr, who began to provide advice for Peterson to improve his baseball skills. Despite helping lead W. F. West High School to two state semifinal appearances, Peterson received little attention from major colleges.

== Career ==
=== Minnesota Twins ===
Opting out of attending a smaller college, Peterson was drafted by the Minnesota Twins in the 49th round of the 2002 MLB draft and paid a $50,000 signing bonus. He played in the Twins farm system from 2003 to 2010. This included his playing with the Elizabethton Twins (Appalachian League), Quad Cities River Bandits (Midwest League), Fort Myers Miracle (Florida State League), New Britain Rock Cats (Eastern League) and Rochester Red Wings (International League).

=== Bridgeport Bluefish ===
He was released from the Twins organization after the 2010 season. Injuring his right knee during winter league baseball in the Dominican Republic, he signed with the Bridgeport Bluefish of the Atlantic League of Professional Baseball, where he played in 2011 and 2012. Peterson went on to play 165 games for the Bluefish, where he hit. 285 with 32 homers and 99 RBI thanks in part from the tutelage of his Bluefish manager, retired ballplayer Willie Upshaw.

=== St. Louis Cardinals ===
On August 14, 2012, he signed a minor league contract with the St. Louis Cardinals, who assigned him to the Triple-A Memphis Redbirds. In 2013 with the Redbirds, he hit .296 in 122 games with 25 homers and 86 RBI. His play earned him a spot on the Triple-A all-star team. He participated in the Triple-A Home Run Derby, leading the first round with 7 home runs and finished in 2nd place.

After spending a decade in minor league and independent league baseball, Peterson was called up to the majors for the first time by the Cardinals on July 20, 2013, becoming the 20,469th player in Major League history. He made his first appearance that same night, in a losing cause against the San Diego Padres, driving in a run in his pinch-hit at-bat with a groundout. He started in left field the following day, collecting his first hit, a pinch-hit RBI single on July 24 against Jake Diekman of the Philadelphia Phillies.

Used largely as a pinch hitter, he went 2 for 26 at the plate during his two-year career with the Cardinals, playing in 23 games; he had two runs scored. On November 5, 2013, Peterson was given his outright release by the Cardinals and elected free agency.

=== Washington Nationals ===
On December 13, 2013, Peterson signed a minor league contract with the Washington Nationals. He played in 72 games for the Triple-A Syracuse Chiefs in 2014, batting .250/.332/.367 with six home runs and 31 RBI.

=== Los Angeles Dodgers ===
On July 1, 2014, Peterson was sold to the Los Angeles Dodgers organization. In 45 games for the Dodgers' Triple-A affiliate, the Albuquerque Isotopes, he slashed .387/.457/.671 with nine home runs and 36 RBI. Peterson's slugging percentage reached .671, the highest of his career but his season was derailed after breaking his thumb on a hit-by-pitch.

=== Minnesota Twins ===
On December 22, 2014, Peterson signed a minor league contract with the Minnesota Twins. He played in 29 games for the Triple-A Rochester Red Wings, slashing .186/.289/.351 with five home runs and 12 RBI. Peterson was released by the Twins organization on May 22, 2015.

=== New York Mets ===
On June 4, 2015, Peterson signed a minor league contract with the New York Mets. He made 80 appearances for the Double-A Binghamton Rumble Ponies, batting .241/.324/.407 with nine home runs and 50 RBI. Peterson elected free agency following the season on November 6. Peterson retired from professional baseball following the season.

== Personal life ==
After his retirement, Peterson studied finance at Old Dominion University. Peterson was paralyzed from the chest down in a diving accident on July 3, 2021 and undertook rehabilitation at the Shepherd Center in Atlanta, Georgia. A fundraiser accumulated over $100,000 weeks after his injury. As a member of the St. Louis Cardinals' 2013 World Series contending team, Peterson attended the 10-year anniversary of the National League Championship at Busch Stadium in 2023.
