= W. F. West High School =

Location
- 342 SW 16th St. Southwest Washington; Chehalis, Washington, Lewis, Washington 98532; 46°38′59″N 122°56′57″W

Information
- Former name: Chehalis High School
- School type: Public high school
- Motto: "Preparing Students For The Journey Ahead"
- Established: 1892 (renamed W. F. West High School 1951)
- Founder: William F. West (donated land for the school)
- School district: Chehalis School District
- Superintendent: Rick Goble
- School code: 302
- School Principal: Regina Carr
- Teaching staff: 54
- Grades: 9–12
- Years offered: 4
- Age range: 14 - 19
- Enrollment: 1,009 (2024–25)
  - Grade 9: 237
  - Grade 10: 254
  - Grade 11: 252
  - Grade 12: 239
- Classes: 145
- Average class size: 19.2
- Student to teacher ratio: 19.2 to 1
- Classes offered: 30 Honors, 8 Advanced, 14 College in the High School, + electives & core
- Schedule: 7:40am - 2:10pm
- Campus type: Suburban
- Colors: Crimson & Gray
- Slogan: "The Bearcat Way"
- Fight song: "On Chehalis"
- Athletics conference: Evergreen 2A
- Mascot: Bearcat
- Rival: Centralia, Tumwater, Black Hills, Aberdeen, Shelton
- Newspaper: The Crimson and Gray
- Yearbook: Chehalin
- Feeder schools: Chehalis Middle School
- Avg. Years of Teaching Experience: 17
- Per-pupil expenditure: $17,511
- ELA SBAC Score: 68.6%
- Math SBAC Score: 34.3%
- Science SBAC Score: 38.9%
- Fewer than two absences per month: 77.8%
- Website: wfw.chehalisschools.org
- Last updated: March 4, 2026

William F. West High School, commonly referred to as W. F. West High School, is a public high school located in Chehalis, Washington, United States. It is the only high school in the Chehalis School District. It was named after a local businessman, William F. West, who donated money and land to the school district.

== History ==
The grounds of the school, then measured at 18 acres (7.3 ha), were donated by William F. West, a prominent businessman and resident in Chehalis. West continued to donate funds in the 1950s for various other needs such as the paving of the school's parking lot and the construction of a sidewalk to Market Street. Other funding provided by West led to improvements of the athletic fields, with such additions of a rubber track and jumping pits. West's charitable actions led to the school being named in his honor.

The school opened a combination gymnasium-music room in February 1954. Considered one of the largest in the state, it was constructed at a cost of $450,000. The addition to the campus officially held an open house with a ceremony and a basketball game between the Chehalis and Centralia boys' basketball teams. The gym, days later, held an Amateur Athletic Union tournament, with a game played that helped to raise funds for a local cerebral palsy charity. The music space, which contained a 1,800 square feet (170 m^{2}) rehearsal room that accommodated up to 110 practice seats, was soundproofed and offered smaller areas for choir practice.

The school was expanded in 1971 to include an additional three rooms. One classroom was for laboratory use and included a darkroom for photography students undertaking a journalism course. The $500,000 project also included a resource center in the library and a choir room.

== Academics and graduation rates ==
=== Academics ===
Students receive free access to the PSAT due to funding provided by a local organization, the Chehalis Foundation. With help from school officials, each senior is required to submit an application for acceptance to Centralia College, a program started by the school district to achieve high rates of graduation, college admission, and career opportunities for the students.

The high school has been host to a University of Washington STEM camp since the early 2010s. A weeklong summer day-camp, the science, technology, engineering, and mathematics classes are held at W.F. West's STEM wing and are open to all students of high school age, regardless of school district. The educational opportunity is based on a partnership between the university and the Chehalis Foundation. To bolster the STEM program further, the school purchased an electron microscope in the mid-2010s.

Beginning in early 2023, students can participate as cashiers and baristas at the "Crimson & Gray", a coffee shop in the school, through the Business and Marketing class. The shop, part of a business and marketing class supported through the Distributive Education Clubs of America (DECA), is run in-full by the students. The shops ingredients and products are supplied from a local coffee shop, L.C. Coffee Company (LCCC). A similar shop, also supported by LCCC, opened in 2025 at Centralia High School. A thrift store, also operated by students, opened in 2025. Funds gained from the enterprise are shared between student clubs at the high school.

=== Graduation rates ===
In 2019, the four-year graduation rate was 95%, bettering the state average by 14 points. The graduation rate in 2024 was 97.6%. In 2010, the level was 77% and 1/3rd of those students achieved admission into a university or training school. In 2018, 73% of seniors who graduated went on to further higher education. That rate increased to 100% in 2019, beginning a six-year stretch in which all graduating senior classes were accepted into college.

The school district initiated a program to increase the percentage of students who received a postgraduate credential that led to a career with a living wage. With a goal to expand the number from 20% to 60% by 2022, the achievement was done quicker than expected and was further repurposed to accelerate the percentage to 75% by 2035 under an initiative known as "75 by 35". The overall education efforts to prepare students for graduation and be accepted into college, military service, or technical training was thought to be the only such type in the state and a rarity in the United States.

In 2024, the total value of scholarships to W.F. West students were recorded to be $3.2 million.

== Extracurricular activities ==
The school sponsors the following sports and extracurricular activities:

- Fall: Cheerleading, Football, Girls Soccer, Cross Country (XC), Boys Tennis and Golf, Girls Swimming, Volleyball, Rifle team, and Pep band
- Winter: Cheerleading, Pep band, Girls and Boys wrestling, Girls and Boys Basketball, Equestrian team, and Girls bowling, and Theater
- Spring: Knowledge Bowl, Baseball, Boys Soccer, Fastpitch, Girls Tennis and Golf, Forensics, and Boys and Girls track

== Sports ==
The school's athletic teams compete as the Bearcats as a member of the Washington Interscholastic Activities Association (WIAA) in the 2A Evergreen Conference. The school has been home to state hall of fame coaches, including Mike Keen, who was elected into the Washington Softball Coaches Association Hall of Fame. Keen won 333 games and three championships under his W.F. West tenure in the early 21st century. Denny "Doc" Daniels was elected to the Washington State Wrestling Coaches Hall of Fame in 2004 and the National Wrestling Hall of Fame in 2013 for Lifetime Service to Wrestling. He coached 61 State Placers during his tenure as head coach from 1985-2001 (assistant coach 1971-85) and his teams earned 9 League Championships and 4 Regional Championships. "National Wrestling Hall of Fame: Denny Daniels". nwhof.org.

The high school is home to an annual track meet known as the Chehalis Activators Invitational and Classic. The competition features a range of schools from Class 1B up to Class 3A.

=== Basketball ===
The high school's gymnasium hosted the first-ever meeting between the rival Portland Trail Blazers and Seattle SuperSonics in an NBA pre-season exhibition game on September 30, 1970.

=== Baseball ===
The baseball fields were renovated after breaking ground in August 2024. Construction began in October and completed before the 2025 baseball season.

=== Football ===
Millett Field was used as home turf for the Chehalis Bearcat's football team until 1932, moving to new grounds after flooding issues and the loss of the grandstand prohibited large crowds from attending the games.

A football game, known as the Thanksgiving Day Game or "The Swamp Cup", was an annual rivalry event between Chehalis and Centralia High School from 1907 to 1963; it later became known also as "The Battle of the Swamp", a moniker giving by the local newspaper, The Chronicle, in 2007. Centralia won the initial game with an 11-0 victory. The matchup, under all its nicknames, has been held continuously since 1919. (Note: The Swamp Cup was not played during the 1918 season due to World War I.)

The Thanksgiving Day competitions between the "Crimson & Gray" and the "Orange & Black" were originally played at Millett Field, or at other high school fields in the Twin Cities; on a few occasions the game was held at the Southwest Washington Fairgrounds. A rivalry that was at times heated, fights broke out between spectators in the stands, with one instance of the fire department using fire hoses on the crowd during a game. When the games were played on the Bearcat's home turf of Millett Field, the Chehalis teams never lost to Centralia; the Bearcat's biggest win at Millet Field was in 1926, winning by a score of 61-0. The Chehalis team lost the final Thanksgiving Day Game 22-6 in 1963.

The rivalry football event was paused beginning before the 2026 season due to scheduling issues and "recent league adjustments". The largest victory for Chehalis, by a score of 83-0, occurred in 1917; the second biggest victory happened in 2025 with a 70-0 shutout. As of 2025, the Bearcats have won 17 consecutive Swamp Cup games. During the history of the competition, which encompassed 155 games, Centralia leads with 77 wins to 72 victories for the Bearcats; there were 6 ties.

=== Tennis ===
The tennis courts were expanded, doubling from two to four, in 1960 after W.F. West donated $6,000 (equivalent to $65,298 in 2025) for the project. The athletic fields and tennis courts were named in his honor.

The W.F. West Tennis Courts were renamed in February 2024 to Coach Jack State Tennis Courts in honor of coach Jack State. The process began under the district's Facility Naming Committee, with a recommendation passed to the Chehalis School Board which approved the name change unanimously. State, who died in January 2024, was both a teacher and coach at the high school, serving 50 years as the tennis coach. In an additional remembrance, a small sign was placed above State's usual coaching position at the courts and a sign measuring 6 ft × 8 ft (1.8 m × 2.4 m) was installed, mirroring State's nickname that was based on his height, "Six-Eight Jack State".

==== State titles ====
Below is a list of state championships won by W. F. West High School in team sports. State titles under the Chehalis High School banner are also included in the table. Bearcat athletes have won numerous individual state titles at both Chehalis and W.F. West high schools in golf, tennis, and track and field. In the 2020s, students have won four individual state wrestling titles, twice each in 2023 and 2025.

State Championships
Season	Sport	Number of Championships	Year	Notes
Fall	Cross Country, Boys	1	1968	The first track-and-field title in school history, the state championship was won by a score of 99 to 143 over Mead High School.
Winter	Basketball, Boys	2	1922, 1960	The 1922 title was achieved under Chehalis High School after Toppenish High School conceded the championship without playing a title game. The W.F. West boys basketball team won the first ever Southwest Washington Class A district title in 1958, going on to record consecutive titles in 1959 and 1960. A similar three-peat was not recorded until La Center in 1995. The 1960 state title was achieved by defeating Sumner High School by a score of 70-56.
Winter	Basketball, Girls	2	2014, 2018	Appearing in a second consecutive final against Mark Morris High School, the team won its first championship in 2014 by a score of 48-37. The two teams met again in 2015, the first such instance of three consecutive basketball title games between the same opponents in Class 2A. The 2018 championship was achieved by overcoming Archbishop Murphy High School by the score of 64-52.
Winter	Bowling, Girls	2	2020, 2023	The bowling team won their first championship in 2020 just three years after adding the sport to the school's curriculum. The 2023 title was achieved by a 15-pin margin over Columbia River High School. Student Piper Chalmers recorded the school's first individual bowling title in 2022. As of 2025, the team has finished in the top-five for 6 consecutive years at the state Class 1A/2A championship.
Winter	Cheerleading, Girls	3	2025, 2026	The cheerleading team won the 2025 and 2026 WIAA 2A State Cheer Championship non-tumbling title. The cheer team also won the 2A/3A "gameday large" title in 2026.
Spring	Baseball	2	2010, 2013	The Bearcats defeated R. A. Long High School, 8-1, to win the 2010 title. The 2013 team defeated Tumwater High School, 12-0.
Spring	Equestrian	2	2008, 2026	The 2008 equestrian title was under the "small team" division. The team won the state title in the medium team division in 2026; students from seven other high schools in Lewis County were part of the team.
Spring	Fastpitch Softball, Girls	5	1999, 2000, 2012, 2015, 2017	The softball team had an undefeated stretch in conference play between 2012-2017. The Bearcats team won the 2012 title by outscoring their opponents by 41 runs during the tournament. The 2015 championship was obtained with a 3-2 victory over White River High School and the 2017 title over Port Angeles High School, 5-1.
Spring	Track and Field, Boys	1	1978	Scoring 48 points in the 1978 championship meet, the Chehalis team broke a 4-year title run by Franklin Pierce High School.
Spring	Wrestling, Boys	1	2007	The 2007 team championship included two individual wrestling titles.
Total		21		

== Facilities ==
The grounds include Bearcat Stadium which was renovated between August 2023 and May 2025. The project was 80% funded by donations organized by the Chehalis Foundation and efforts included new drainage systems, lighting, and "professional-grade turf". Students in the school's career and technical education program also participated in the effort, helping to build concrete formwork, improving the dugouts, and installing metal roofing. The improvements allowed the stadium to be open and used throughout the year.

In order to meet Washington state's Clean Buildings Performance Standard for large non-residential buildings, 76 solar modules were installed on the STEM wing in April 2026. Beginning in June, an additional 425 panels were added to two canopies located in the school's parking lot. Funding for the $2.1 million effort was fully provided under a grant from the Washington State Department of Commerce.

== Traditions ==
The graduating class of W.F. West High School holds a local parade that traverses through several neighborhood and business districts in Chehalis, ending at Stan Hedwall Park. It is customary for seniors to receive various gifts, including monetary, during the senior year and at graduation. The contributions are paid for by a fund raised by parents. The graduating class also participates in a "Senior Walk", visiting the elementary and middle schools in Chehalis. Begun in the late 2010s, it allows seniors to meet with younger pupils and reconnect with previous teachers and staff.

== Notable alumni ==
- Norm Bright, Chehalis High School, record-setting distance runner
- George Dahlberg, Chehalis High School football coach, 1936-1937
- Dave Dowling, former MLB player
- Barbara Feigin, class of 1955, recognized as the first woman to be a major advertising executive in the United States
- Woody Jensen, Chehalis High School, former MLB player
- Dave Nisbet, Chehalis High School, former NFL player
- Andy Olson, Arena Football League head coach
- Nathan Overbay, class of 2005, former National Football League player
- Brock Peterson, former Major League Baseball player
- Victor Clough Rambo, Chehalis High School, American medical missionary and ophthalmologist
- Orin C. Smith, CEO and President of Starbucks Corporation
- Elmer Tesreau, Chehalis High School, former college football player for Washington
