= Willapa Hills Trail =

State park and trail in Washington, United States

Coordinates: 46°38′51″N 122°58′24″W

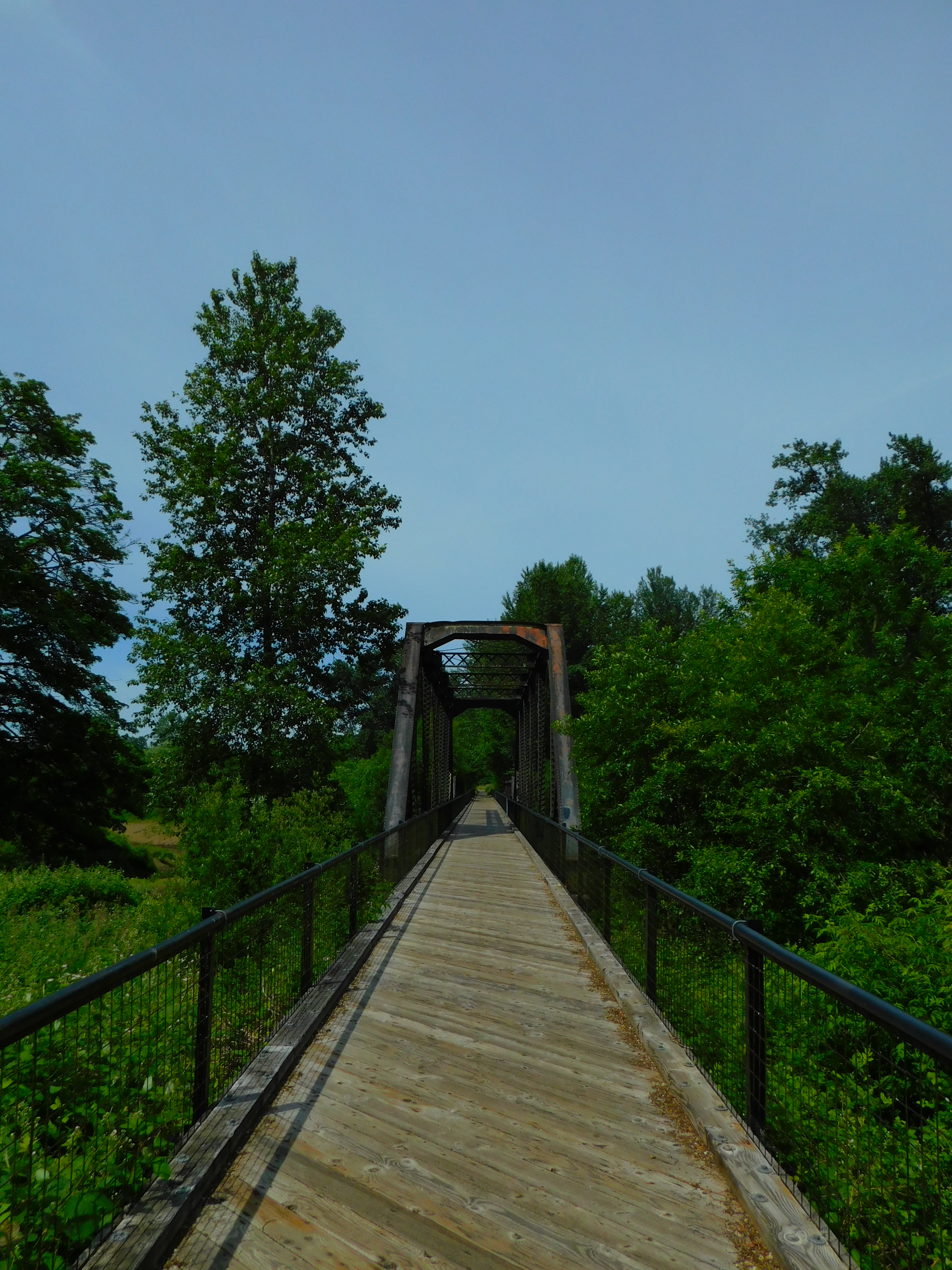
- Northern Pacific Railway Newaukum River Bridge over the Newaukum River, near the Chehalis trailhead
- Length: 56 miles (90 km)
- Location: Lewis County, Washington
- Began construction: 1993
- Use: Hiking, Biking, Horse riding
- Elevation change: Minimal
- Grade: maximum of 2%
- Difficulty: Easy to moderate
- Hazards: Incomplete portions in Pacific County
- Surface: Paved, gravel
- Maintainer: Washington State Parks and Recreation Commission
- Website: WA State Parks - Willapa Hills Trail

The Willapa Hills Trail is a 56.0-mile (90.1 km) intercounty rail trail in the U.S. state of Washington that is part of the Willapa Hills State Park. Following an east–west route alongside State Route 6, the tract links Chehalis and South Bend, traveling through or near several small towns and parks along the way. Overseen by the Washington State Parks and Recreation Commission, local cities and towns often maintain areas of the trail within their jurisdictions. The trail is built upon a decommissioned railroad track.

== Route ==
The Willapa Hills Trail (WHT) is rated as easy to moderate with minimal elevation gain; the grade does not exceed 2% during any portion on the pathway. The WHT stretches from its eastern terminus at Chehalis, between Lintott-Alexander Park and Stan Hedwall Park, to the western cessation that is near downtown South Bend, Washington, mostly in parallel with State Route 6. Approximately 1 mile (1.6 km) from the Chehalis trailhead, visitors cross over the rail line of the Chehalis–Centralia Railroad.

By 2003, the WHT was recorded to cross 35 bridges and trestles. The trail in Lewis County contains 18 bridges and crosses the Newaukum River by way of the Northern Pacific Railway Newaukum River Bridge near the Chehalis trailhead; it passes over the Chehalis River five times in the county including Bridge 5 and Spooner Bridge, east and west respectively, near Adna. A spur traverses through Rainbow Falls State Park near Dryad and passes over the Dryad Bridge towards the ghost town of Walville.

The path crosses several creeks in Pacific County, and twice over the Willapa River; the trail follows the river as it courses mostly through farmland and forest. Users can stop at Willie Keil's Grave State Park Heritage Site, north of Menlo. The WHT starts to accompany U.S. Route 101 in Raymond.

Mostly complete within Lewis County, with a mix of pavement and compact gravel, (Note: The gravel remaining on unimproved portions of the trail was noted to be the original track ballast from the 1890s.) the WHT is only completed between Raymond and South Bend in Pacific County with large tracts in the county considered unimproved, though useable with caution. The trail is under the maintenance auspices of the Washington State Parks and Recreation Commission (WSPRC) and is open for non-motorized activities year round to hikers, bicyclists, and horse riding.

=== Cities, towns, and communities ===
Beginning in Lewis County and Chehalis, and heading west, the trail traverses by the neighborhood of Claquato, and into the communities of Littell and Adna. The course continues into the Rainbow Falls area, reaching Meskill and the twin towns of Dryad and Doty. The trail leaves eastern Lewis County after passing through Pe Ell and McCormick. Between Adna and Meskill, the pathway travels through the extinct railroad stops of Millburn and Ruth, as well as the former community of Ceres.

The first community the trail reaches in Pacific County is Frances. Continuing on to Lebam and Holcomb, the trail cuts through Menlo before reaching the city of Raymond, ending in South Bend.

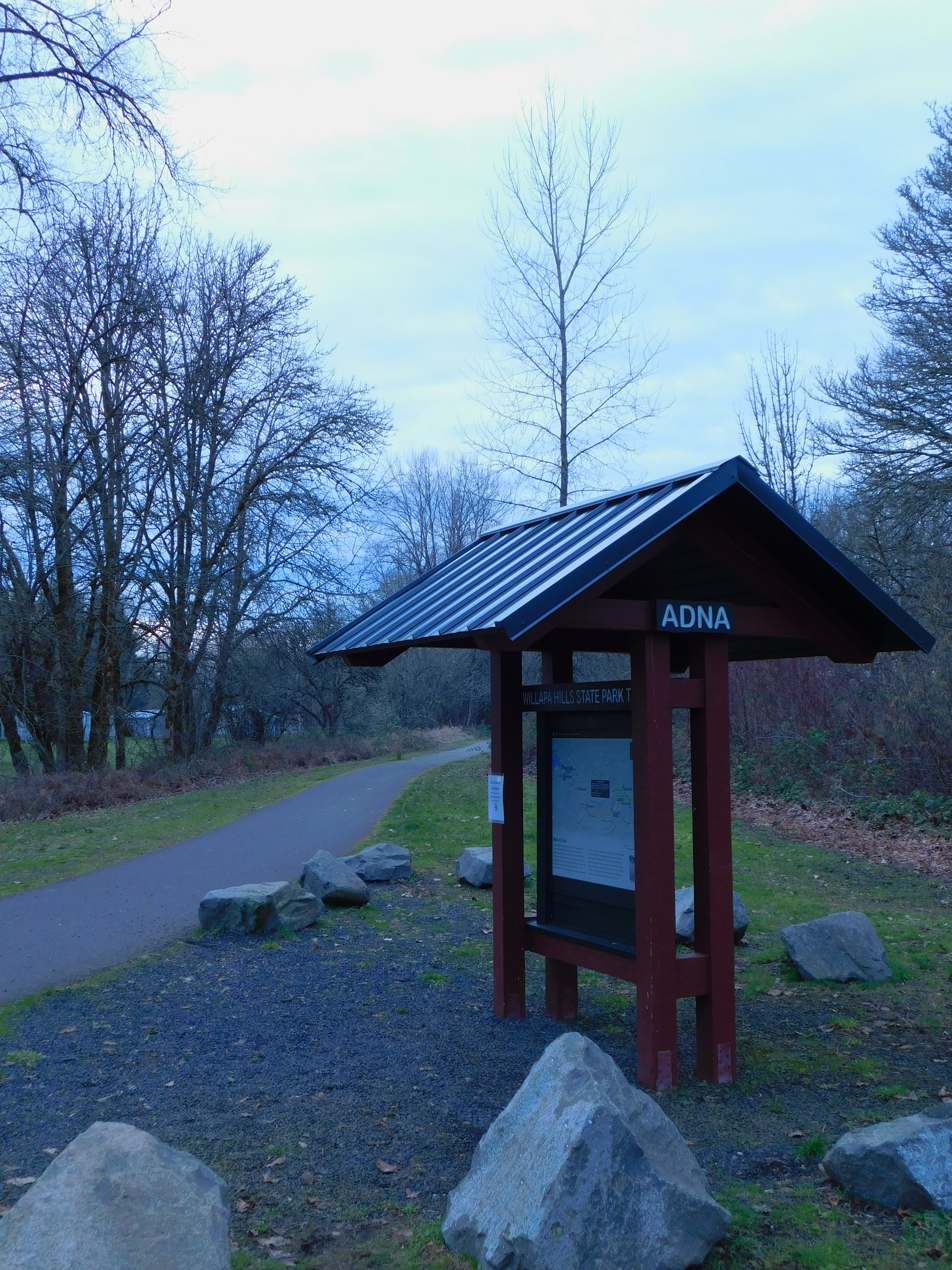
Adna trailhead

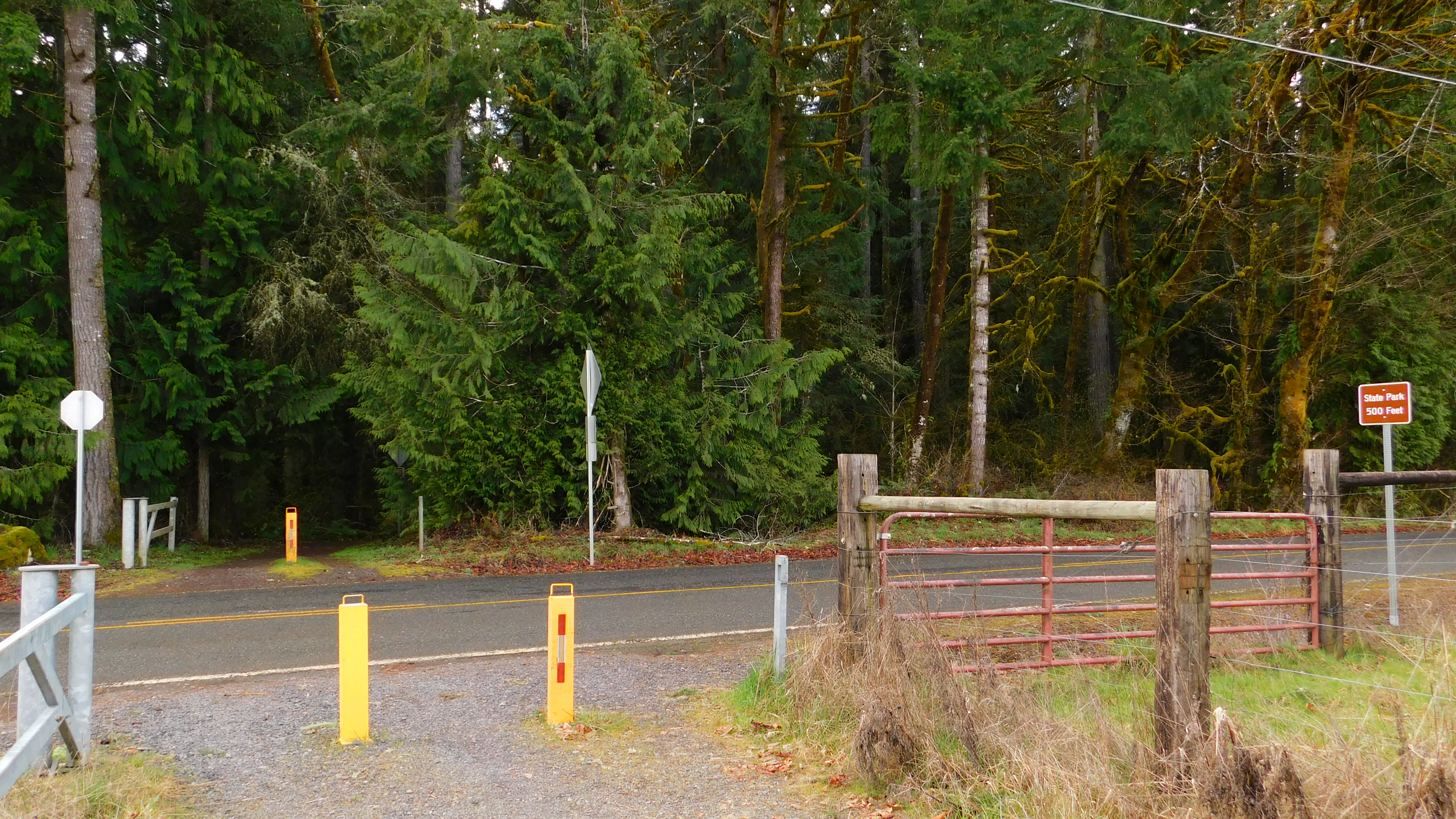
Rainbow Falls spur

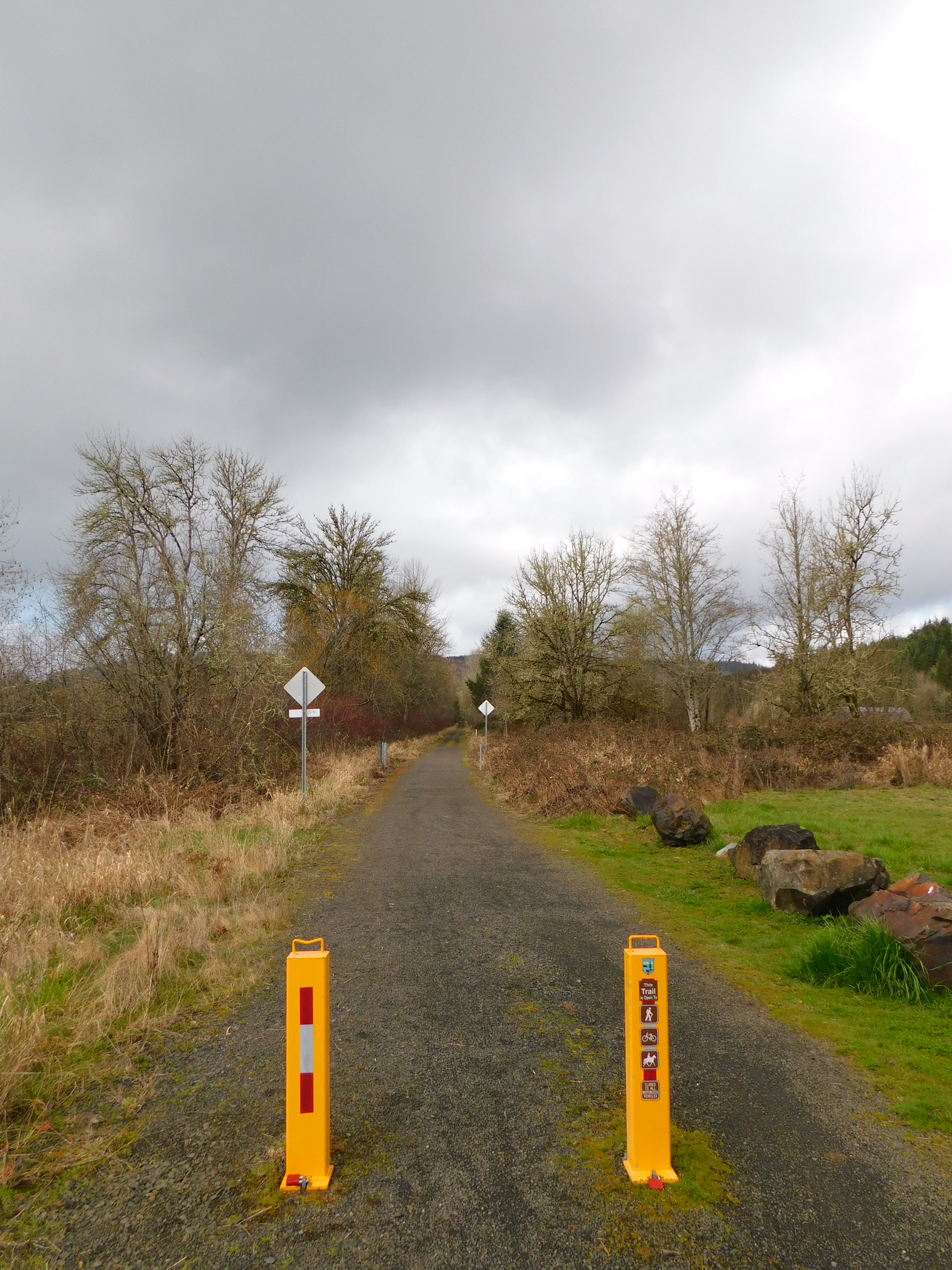
Trailhead at Ceres

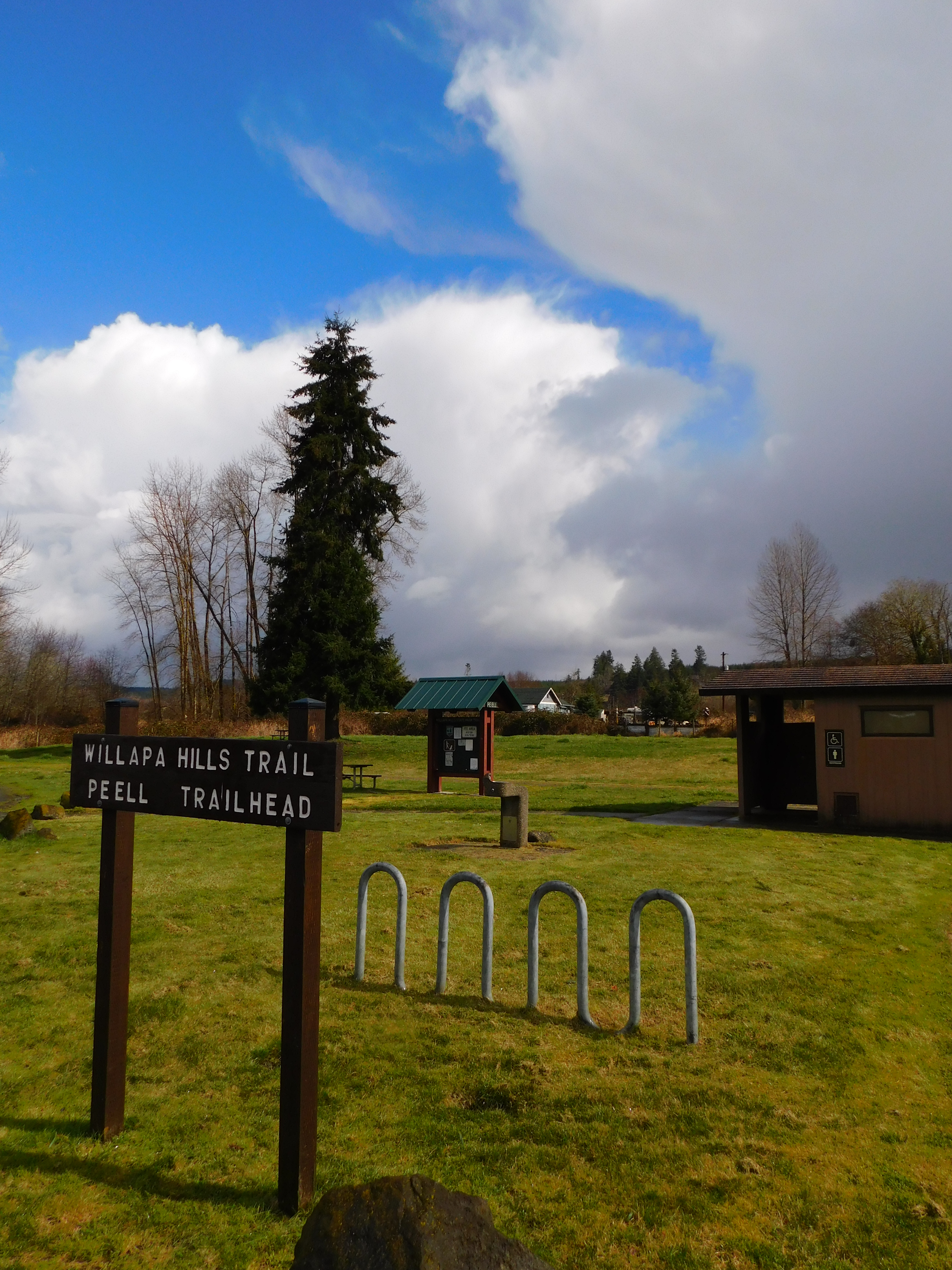
Trailhead, facilities at Pe Ell

== History ==
=== Beginnings of the Willapa Hill Trail ===
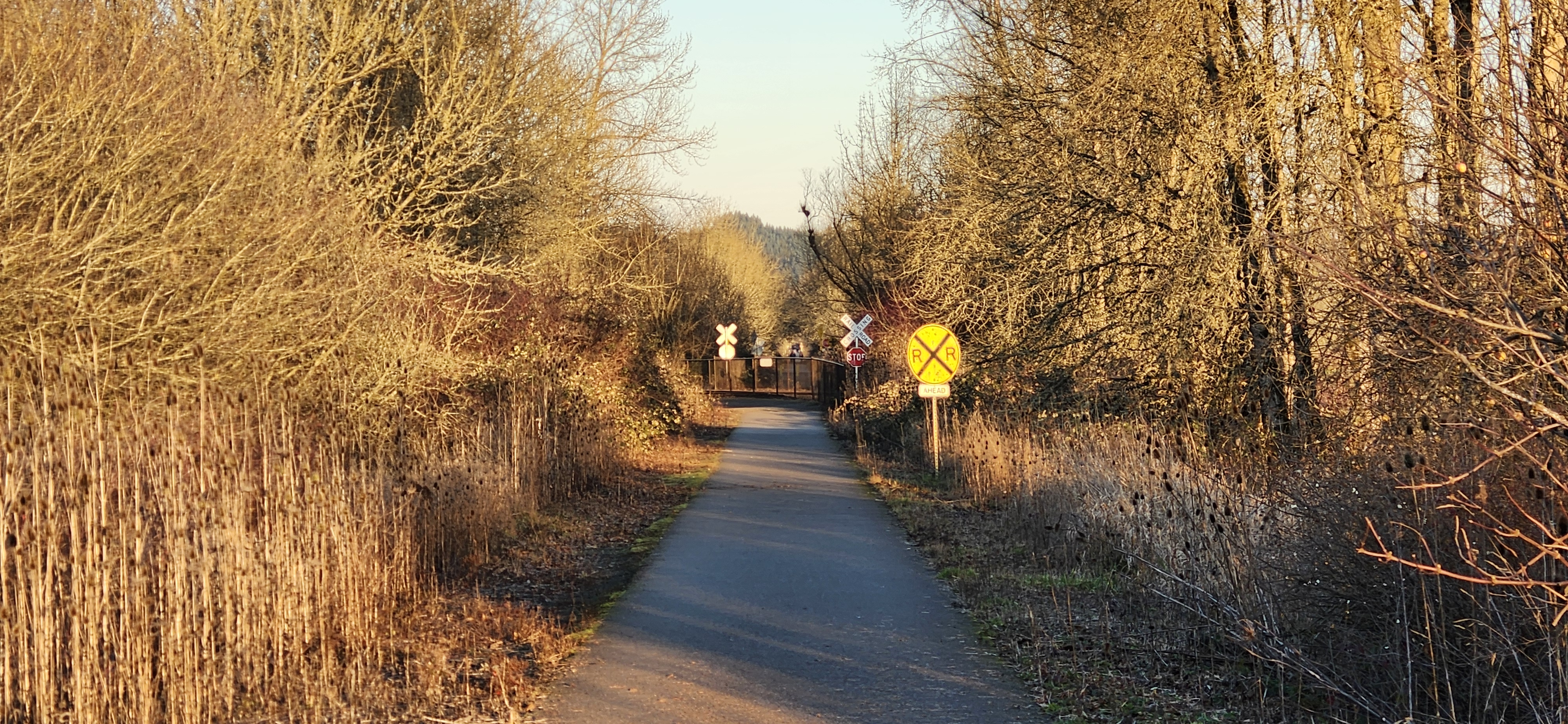
Railroad crossing near Tune Road, Lewis County, 2026

The trail, known locally at first as "Rails to Trails", was built over a decommissioned railroad line originally constructed by Northern Pacific Railway in 1892. The rail line, considered a spur, was used for both freight and passenger service. The flag stop passenger trains included a parlor car and reached a peak of four daily trips by 1907. The final passenger train ride occurred under ceremony on March 19, 1954. Rail freight declined by the 1980s due to increased truck hauling and decreased timber production. The line continued to be used for commercial purposes until 1990, when it was designated as abandoned by the owner at the time, Burlington Northern Railroad. The WSPRC acquired the entire 757-acre (306 ha) stretch in 1993 and created the Willapa Hills State Park.

Volunteer efforts and local fundraising led to minor improvements to the new trail, though there were initial concerns by Willapa River Valley residents near the pathway over issues of littering, privacy, rights of way, and trespassing. The first section considered completed was a 7.0-mile (11.3 km) stretch between Rainbow Falls State Park and Pe Ell. that officially opened in 2001.

The first large-scale effort was begun in 2007. In association with several Native American tribes, such as the Chehalis, Cowlitz, and Shoalwater, and with a combined $1.4 million in funding from various federal and state agencies, the early renovation efforts included specific attention to a 5-mile (8.0 km) stretch between Chehalis and Adna for paving, surfacing the rail bed, restoring trestles, and improving trailheads.

=== Flood of 2007 and continuing restoration ===
Due to damage from floods during the Great Coastal Gale of 2007, several bridges and trestles were repaired. Funding in the amount of $4.5 million from the Federal Emergency Management Agency (FEMA), allowed the rebuild of two 300 foot (91 metres) bridges near Adna and Dryad. The reconstruction of the Dryad Bridge and the Adna trestles, known as Bridge 5 and Spooner Bridge, was not completed until 2016. The management company involved in the overall bridge project won a Best in State award from the American Council of Engineering Companies for their efforts. The last phase of improvements in Lewis County was refurbishing a 4-mile (6.4 km) section from Pe Ell west to the county line. Completed in 2018, the $600,000 project was funded by charitable donations and grants from various state government agencies.

=== 21st century ===
The Chehalis River is mostly inaccessible due steep slopes and any points of access to the waterway off the trail are beset by the legalities of bordering private property. To offset this concern, as well as provide "passive recreational experiences" via a gateway to the Chehalis River, the parks system purchased, in 2016, a 180-acre (73 ha) plot in the former community of Ceres. Once farmland, the site became a trailhead and provides the closest approach to a rare low-bank access point to the river.

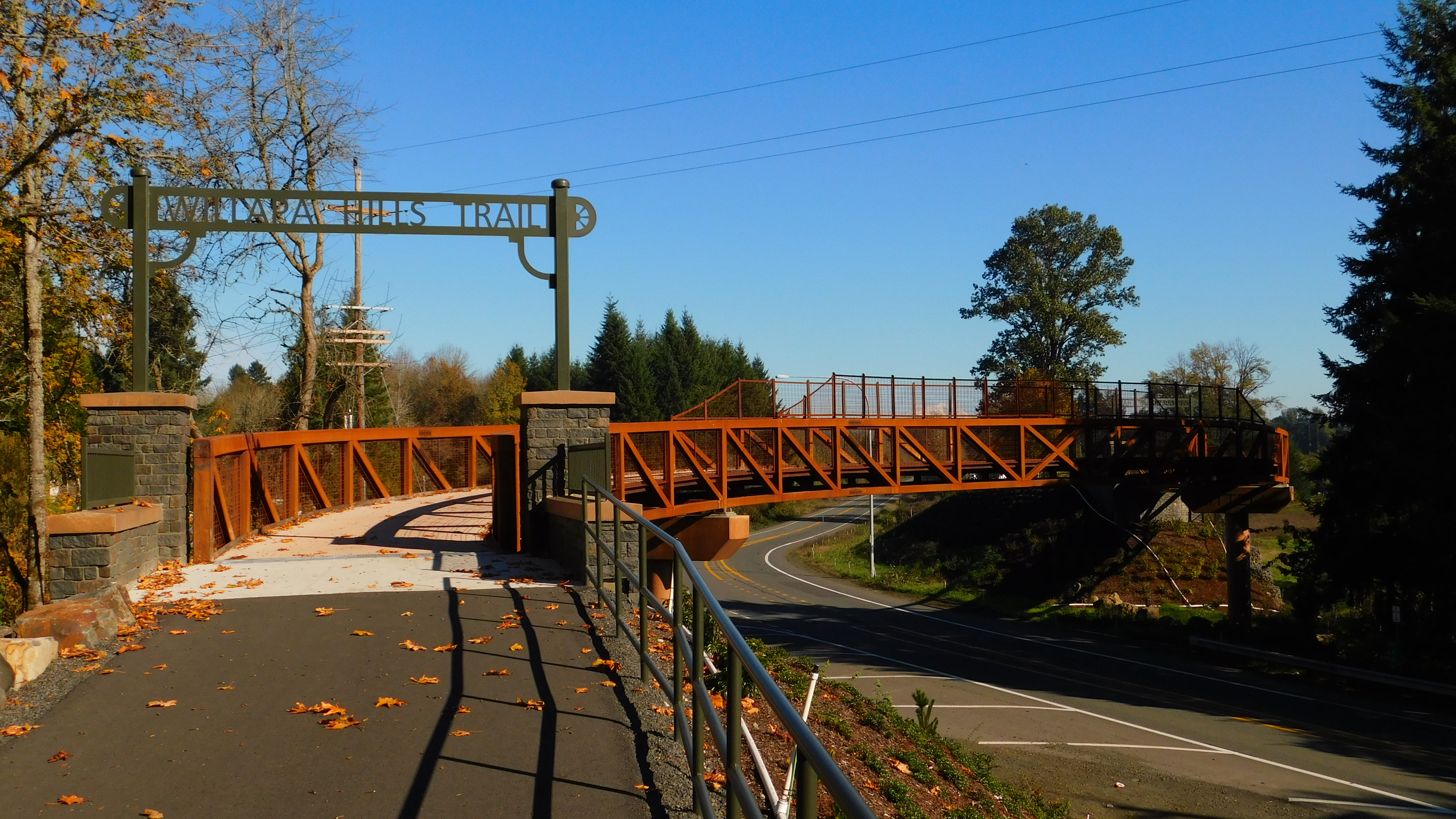
Willapa Hills Trail pedestrian bridge, Littell, Washington 2023

Construction of a $3.3 million pedestrian bridge over Washington State Route 6, less than one mile west of Claquato, was begun in 2021 to lessen vehicular dangers for users of the trail. The overpass was completed in June 2023 and named the Littell Bridge in recognition of the local unincorporated community of Littell where it was built.

The trail was planned to be "rideable all the way through" by 2024 due to a combination of restoration projects in Pacific County totaling $8.7 million. The financing was provided by the Washington Wildlife and Recreation Program (WWRP), various federal and state funding, and donations from the community. The 2024 project was overseen by the Washington State Parks and Recreation Commission and the trail would be considered unimproved at a 15-mile midsection stretch, though a schedule for additional funding and completion is foreseen in 2026.

=== Future plans ===
A long-term plan for the Willapa Hills Trail by the WSPRC is to join the pathway to other similar hiking routes, creating a linked Rail-to-Trail system from the Pacific Ocean to Idaho.

Planned renovations for the trail include compact gravel improvements to a 17.0-mile (27.4 km) stretch of the course in Pacific County, a new 2.6-acre (1.1 ha) trailhead in South Bend, and the construction of a trailhead marker for the community of Menlo. The restoration of the Willapa River Swing Bridge, in Raymond, is being explored with the intention of adding it to the course of the trail.

=== Zack's Law ===
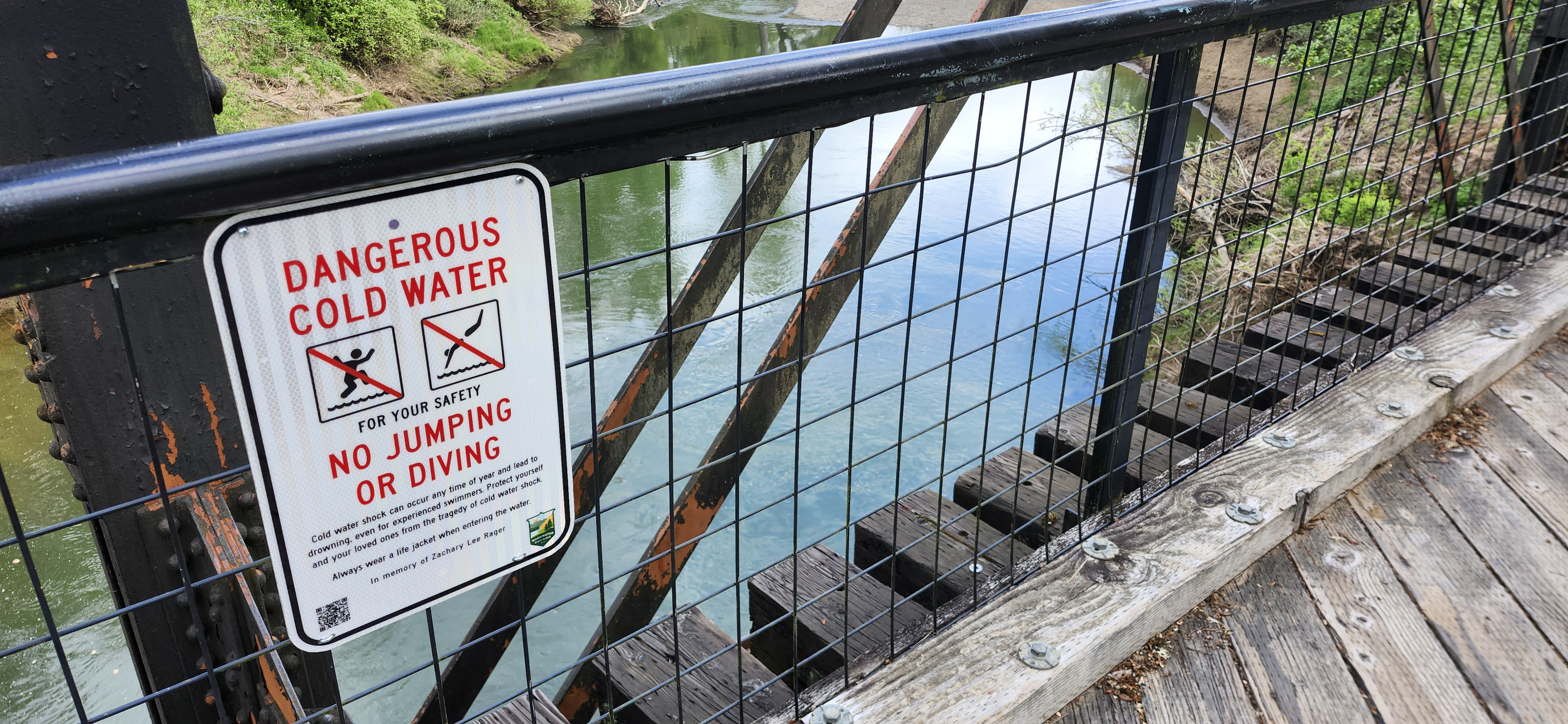
Cold water shock sign, 2025

The Washington State Legislature unanimously passed House Bill 1004, known as Zack's Law, in 2023. Due in part to a petition, the law requires the state to post warnings of the dangers of jumping from bridges and subsequent drowning hazards, with particular outreach to provide information regarding cold water shock. The law was named after Zachary Lee Rager who perished from cold water shock while jumping into the Chehalis River from a trestle bridge on the Willapa Hills Trail. The law also stipulates that a memorial sign about Rager be placed near the bridge where his death occurred.

== Public art and attractions ==
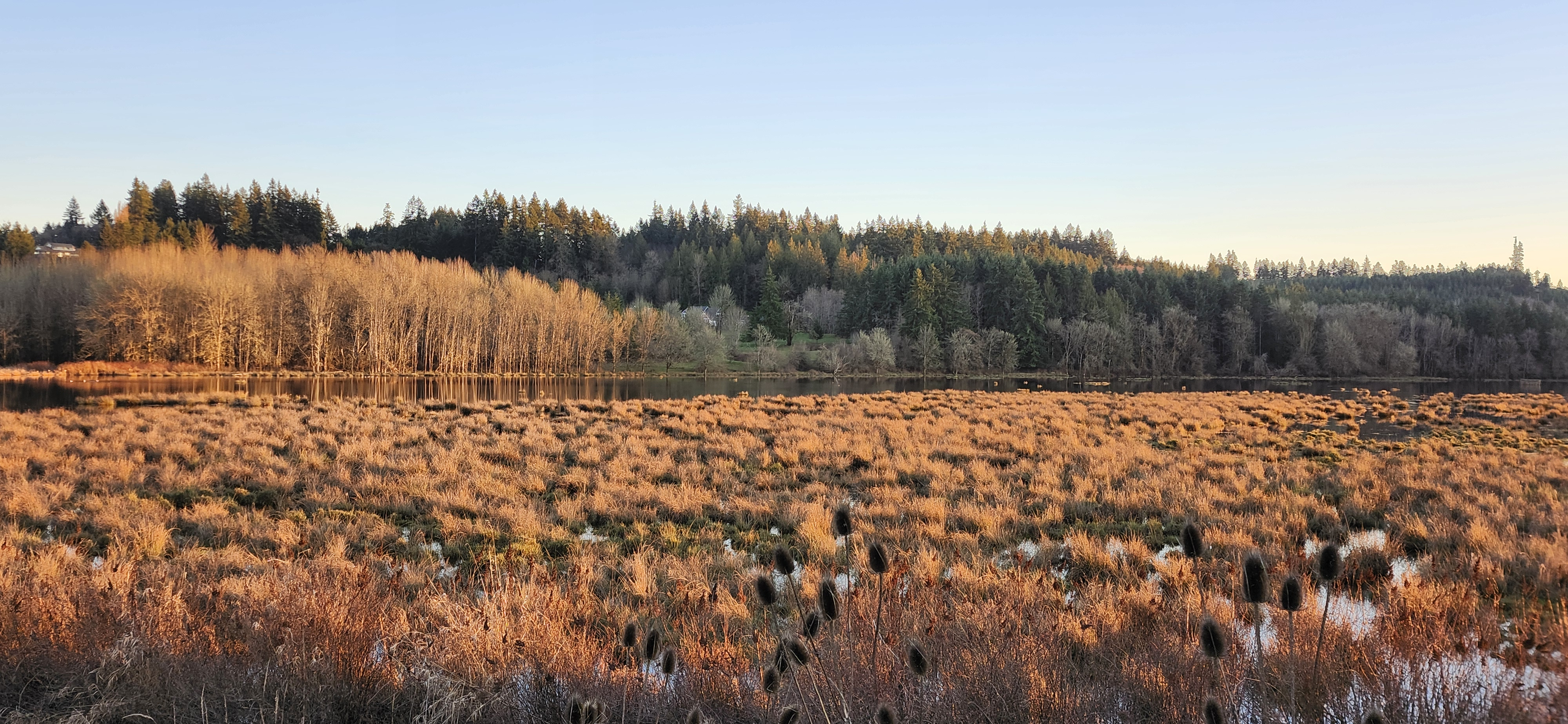
Wetlands near Chehalis trailhead, 2026

The trail incorporates the Raymond Wildlife-Heritage Sculpture Corridor, a public art display of steel sculptures throughout Raymond. Based on an early renewal initiative in the city, the artworks were installed in 1993. The Raymond trailhead is near the city's Northwest Carriage Museum.

The bridge over the Chehalis between Doty and Dryad was an original 1897 trestle that was located over the Tongue River in Montana. The bridge was taken apart, moved, and reassembled for use on the trail.

== Events and charitable organizations ==
The non-profit Lewis County Community Trail Association has hosted, since 2016, an annual, two-day "Ride the Willapa" bike event in early summer to raise funds to maintain and complete the trail. With the trail coursing through farmland, the charity ride often incorporates a farm tour. Before 2016, a similar yearly event was held under the name "Fat Tire Ride".

== See also ==
- List of rail trails in Washington
- Parks and recreation in Chehalis, Washington
