= Meskill, Washington =

Unincorporated community in Washington, United States

- Unincorporated community
- Location within Washington (state) Location within the United States
- Coordinates: 46°38′17″N 123°10′15″W
- Country: United States
- State: Washington
- County: Lewis
- Established: 1905
- Elevation: 256 ft (78 m)
- Time zone: UTC-8 (Pacific (PST))
  - Summer (DST): UTC-7 (PDT)
- ZIP Code: 98532
- Area code(s): 360, 564

Meskill is an unincorporated community off Washington State Route 6 in Lewis County, Washington. The town is located near Rainbow Falls State Park, and rests between Ceres and Dryad. The Willapa Hills Trail bisects the area.

== History ==
The site was originally owned by Francis Donahue and the town was named Donahue Spur in 1902. The name of Meskill, taken from the Meskill Lumber Company, would be bestowed in 1905 to the post office, which lasted until 1920.

The mill burned down in 1921 nearly destroying the town. The lumber plant was never rebuilt. Though founded as a timber community, the town began a rock quarry in 1908 that helped provide the base for expanding railroad lines and to build a macadam road in the county. Inmates from local penitentiaries would work at the site and the town would often have to deal with escape attempts.

== Government and politics ==
Presidential Elections Results
Year	Republican	Democratic	Third parties
2008	58.3% 49	36.9% 31	4.8% 4
2012	69.8% 67	30.2% 29	0.0% 0
2016	70.6% 60	24.7% 21	4.7% 4
2020	71.2% 84	26.3% 31	2.5% 3
2024	72.0% 90	27.2% 34	0.8% 1

=== Politics ===
The 2020 election included 3 votes for the Libertarian Party candidate. In the 2024 election, one vote was tallied for Robert F. Kennedy Jr..
