= McCormick, Washington =

Unincorporated community in Washington, United States

- Unincorporated community
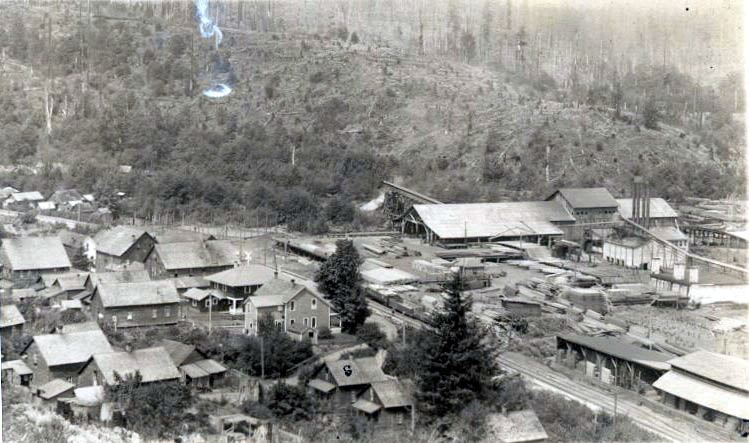
- View of McCormick, Washington, ca 1911

- Location within Washington (state) Location within the United States
- Coordinates: 46°33′13″N 123°19′34″W
- Country: United States
- State: Washington
- County: Lewis
- Established: 1899
- Elevation: 466 ft (142 m)
- Time zone: UTC-8 (Pacific (PST))
  - Summer (DST): UTC-7 (PDT)
- ZIP Code: 98572
- Area code(s): 360, 564

McCormick is an unincorporated community off Washington State Route 6 in Lewis County, in the U.S. state of Washington. The town is west of Pe Ell and 1.8 miles east of the extinct town of Walville, Washington and the Pacific County line. The Willapa Hills Trail bisects the area.

== History ==
The town was built in 1897 around a mill for the McCormick Lumber Company, owned by George and Harry McCormick, which began operations the following year. Located on a branch line of the Northern Pacific Railroad, a post office was named after the mill and established around that time, (Note: Various sources differ on the actual year, listing 1896, 1898, or 1899.) remaining in operation until 1929. The community's location was situated in forested lands considered to contain the highest quality timber in the county.

The mill was rebuilt after it suffered a near-total loss in 1909. It closed in 1927 as lumber production at the plant had become idle. The town began to be demolished, with materials salvaged by a new owner of the company. A tuberculosis sanitorium was opened in 1935 and closed in 1941.

Considered a ghost town afterwards despite continual habitation, most of the property was bought out beginning in 1954 by George Fraser, a retired tailor from Centralia.
