= Dryad, Washington =

Unincorporated community in Washington, United States

- Unincorporated community
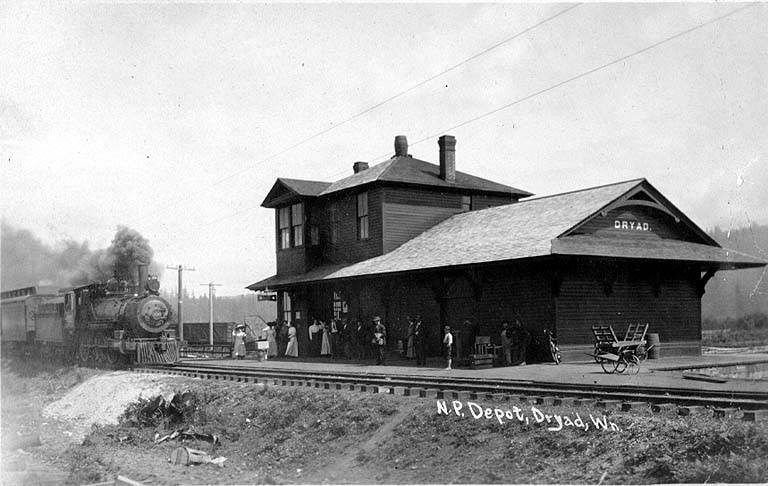
- Northern Pacific Railroad station, Dryad, Washington, ca. 1915

- Location within Washington (state) Location within the United States
- Coordinates: 46°38′14″N 123°14′57″W
- Country: United States
- State: Washington
- County: Lewis
- Established: 1890
- Elevation: 302 ft (92 m)
- Time zone: UTC-8 (Pacific (PST))
  - Summer (DST): UTC-7 (PDT)
- ZIP Code: 98532
- Area code(s): 360, 564
- GNIS feature ID: 1504571

Dryad is a rural unincorporated community in Lewis County, Washington. The town of Doty is 1.3-miles to the west, with Adna and Ceres to the east, on Washington State Route 6. The Chehalis River bisects the area.

== Etymology ==
The Doty-Dryad area, before it was settled, was once known as North Prairie. The community became known as Salal. The name Dryad was supplied by Northern Pacific Railway officials around 1890 at the suggestion of Willam C. Albee, who was superintendent of the Pacific Division of the NP. In mythology, a dryad was a wood nymph. Albee figured that a dryad might find itself right at home living in the local fir and cedar trees.

== History ==
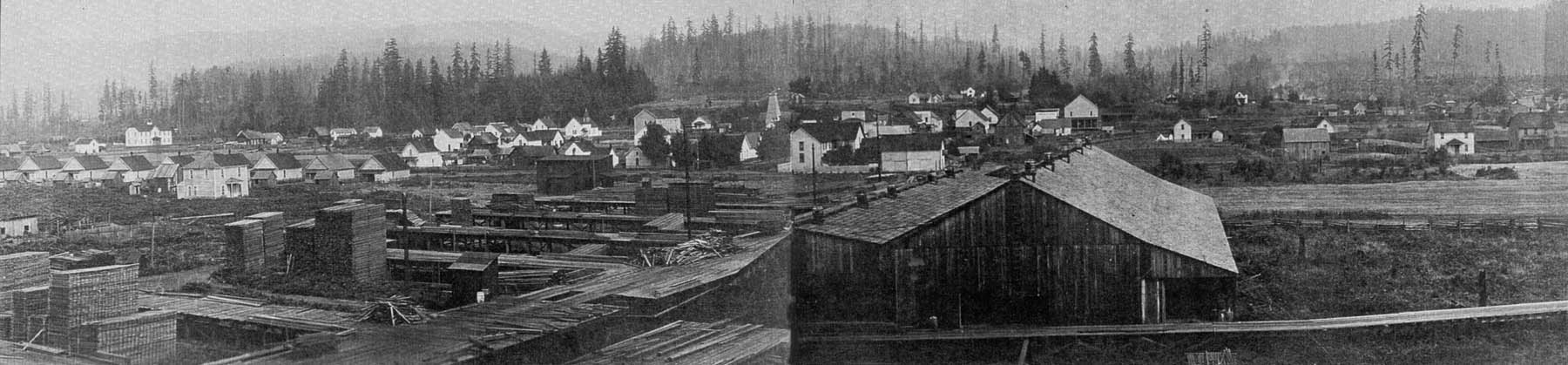
Panoramic of early 1900s Dryad, Washington

The lands were first settled in 1852 by Joseph and Karolina Mauermann, Austrian immigrants who traveled by wagon train from Missouri. The region was inundated with strands of old growth fir and teemed with abundant wildlife, including cougars which caused issues for farmers attempting to raise cattle. The closest post office at the time was in Olympia, approximately 50 miles (80 km) away. A post office in Dryad was eventually begun and continued until 1957 when the mail route to the community was absorbed by the post office in Chehalis.

Dryad is one of many former lumber towns that sprang up on the Willapa Harbor Line (Chehalis, Washington to South Bend, Washington) of the Northern Pacific Railway. The town was originally located two miles south of the present location. The community moved when the Leudinghaus brothers of Chehalis built a sawmill at the present site in 1902.

The Dryad Community Baptist Church was built in 1903 and has remained open since its construction. Renovations in 2006 were done to the bell tower and roof, with stained glass windows installed in 2018.

== Climate ==
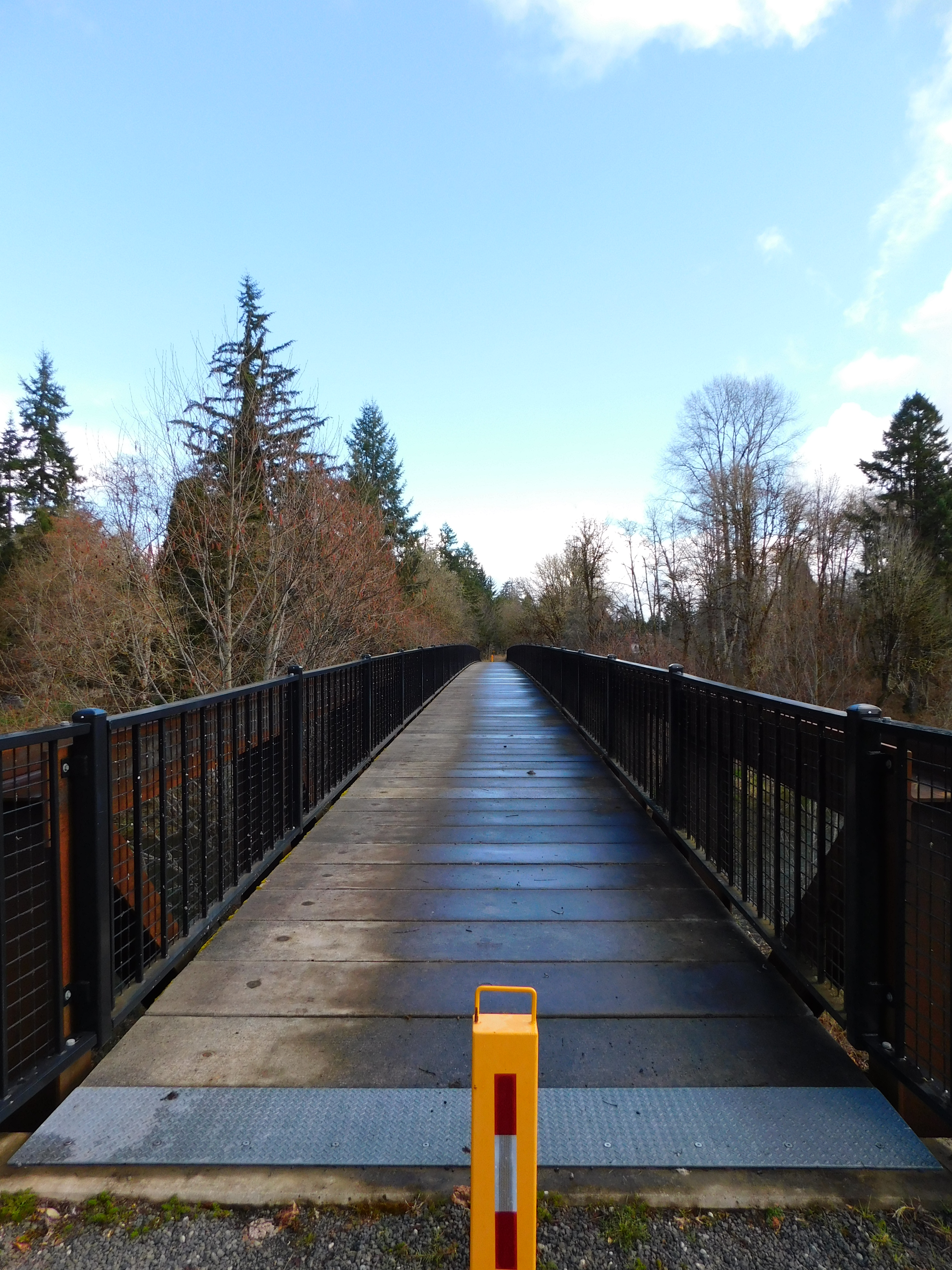
Between Dryad and Doty, Willapa Hills Trail bridge over the Chehalis River, 2025

This region experiences warm (but not hot) and dry summers, with no average monthly temperatures above 71.6 °F. According to the Köppen Climate Classification system, Dryad has a warm-summer Mediterranean climate, abbreviated "Csb" on climate maps.

== Parks and Recreation ==
The annual Pe Ell River Run passes through Dryad. Held since 1978, the event consists of entrants buying or building water crafts and floating down the Chehalis River from Pe Ell to Rainbow Falls State Park, which is one mile due east of the town. Riders can float over a slight waterfall that still remains despite severe flooding damage due to the Great Coastal Gale of 2007.

The Willapa Hills Trail passes through the town.

== Government and politics ==
Presidential Elections Results
Year	Republican	Democratic	Third parties
2008	66.7% 112	30.4% 51	3.0% 5
2012	65.3% 111	31.2% 53	3.5% 6
2016	76.4% 136	20.2% 36	3.4% 6
2020	75.4% 178	22.9% 54	1.7% 4
2024	76.3% 177	22.8% 53	0.9% 2

=== Politics ===
As Dryad is an unincorporated community, there are no defined bounds, and the precinct may be incongruous with the census boundaries.

The 2020 election included 2 votes for candidates of the Libertarian Party. In the 2024 election, there was one vote cast for Robert F. Kennedy Jr..

== Education ==
Dryad once had a school that taught all levels, from elementary to high school. After two consolidations with the Pe Ell school district in the late-1930s and during World War II, the schoolhouse became an apartment building.
