= Rainbow Falls State Park =

State park in Washington State, USA

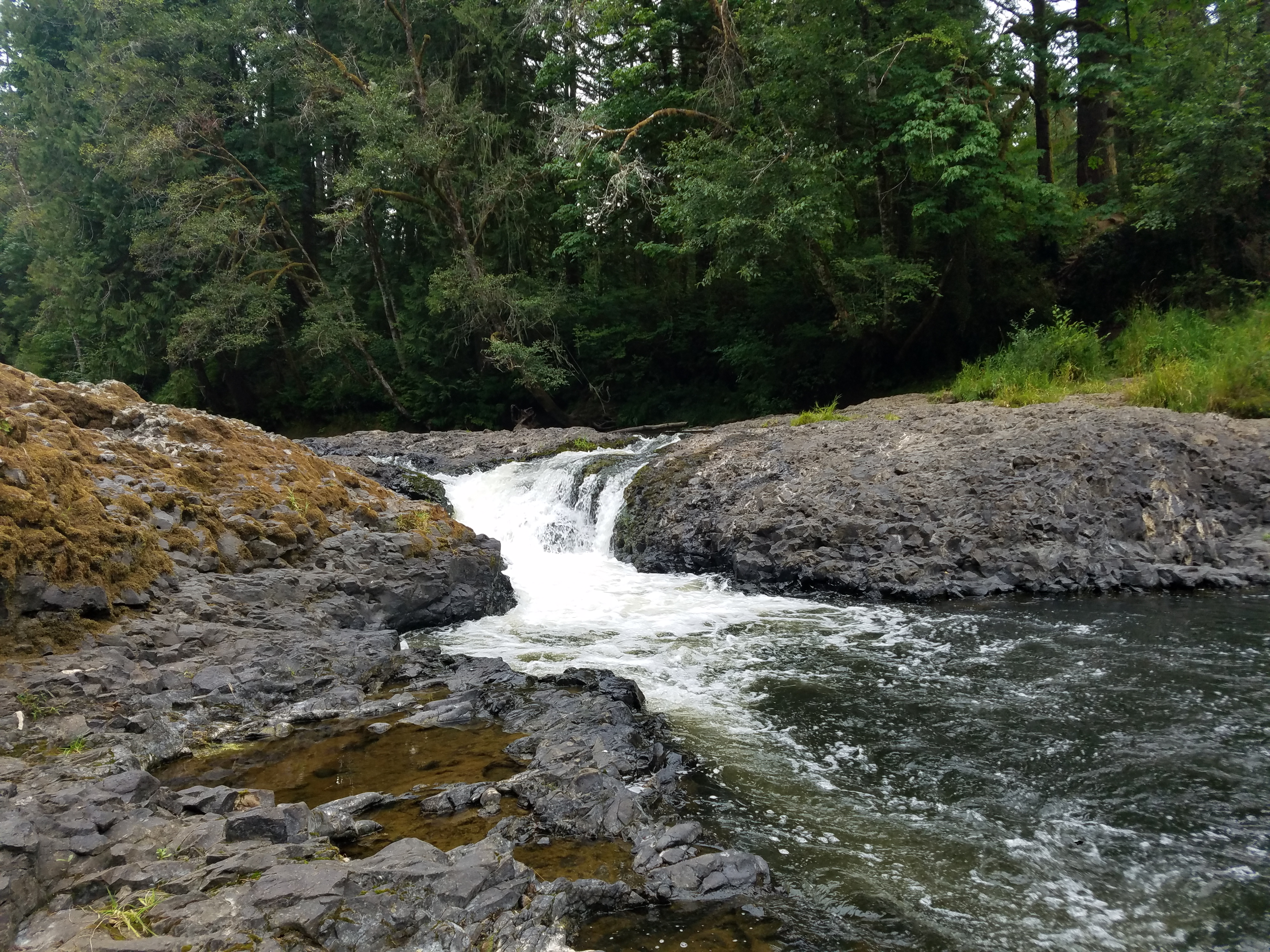
- Falls on the Chehalis River

- Location within Washington (state) Location within the United States
- Location: Lewis County, Washington, United States
- Coordinates: 46°37′43″N 123°13′51″W
- Area: 129 acres (52 ha)
- Elevation: 331 ft (101 m)
- Established: 1935
- Administrator: Washington State Parks and Recreation Commission
- Visitors: 93,904 (in 2024)
- Website: Official website

Rainbow Falls State Park is a public recreation area on the Chehalis River. It is situated off State Route 6 and is approximately 1.0 mile (1.6 km) east of Dryad, Washington.

The state park's 129 acres (52 ha) rests on grounds originally part of an inland sea. Geological features include 3,900 feet (1,200 m) of shoreline of basalt rock formed 17 million years ago and the waterfall for which the park is named. Surviving old-growth trees, some of the last standing in the Chehalis Valley, occupy the site.

The park was built by the Civilian Conservation Corps, completed in 1935. Flooding of the Chehalis River has led to several damages at the park, including the loss of some waterfall features and a popular footbridge after the Great Coastal Gale of 2007.

Amenities include campgrounds, miles of trails, and can be accessed by a short spur route of the Willapa Hills Trail. Rainbow Falls State Park is the end point of the annual Pe Ell River Run that began in 1978.

== History ==
Rainbow Falls was used by the Upper Chehalis people as a fishing site for lampreys. The area was eventually in the hands of private ownership, used for a time as a community park, and in 1933, was traded for other state lands.

The area was named as Rainbow Falls State Park, with two theories over the origin of the moniker. One version suggests that the name was given by a citizen from Dryad who served in a World War I military division known as the Rainbow Division. The more accepted, second theory is that the designation derived from the rainbows formed due to the rushing waters. Local history speaks of early settlers in the area referring to the rapids as Rainbow Falls.

The Civilian Conservation Corps (CCC), Company 1633, built the park, its log structures, and a popular footbridge over the falls, completing the grounds in 1935. The grounds contained an old growth forest spared during the site's early years. The park was noted for having the tallest flag pole at a CCC camp, measuring 135 feet (41.1 m) in height.

During the construction in April 1934, a group of 28 Black employees from Illinois were assigned to the CCC camp at Rainbow Falls. The Black men lived in segregated barracks, but unlike stricter separation requirements noted at Millersylvania State Park at the same time, the camp's workers often labored side-by-side. The enrollees were reassigned after their first six-month term of service following a CCC directive that no Black employees were allowed to work outside the borders of their own states. The edict officially introduced a segregation mandate.

The wooden bridge was restored in 2006 and additional improvements, including the construction of a kitchen and new bathroom facilities, were also undertaken that year.

=== Floods ===
Due to the park's location on the Chehalis River, the site has experienced several floods and subsequent damages. The footbridge was nearly destroyed during a buildup of a log jam during the 1972 Lewis County Flood; the height of the log jam exceeded the top of the bridge.

In December 2007, the park suffered severe flooding which destroyed the footbridge, other bridges along the Willapa Hills Trail, as well as the park's main entrance. Damages were listed at $6.5 million and visitors began using an alternate entrance to the park in 2008. In January 2008, cleanup of the grounds were undertaken by volunteers, which include naval personnel and their families stationed at Naval Base Kitsap.

A revised entrance was constructed at the location of the original CCC gateway and by 2011, the kitchen area and picnic areas, including playgrounds, were restored.

== Geography ==
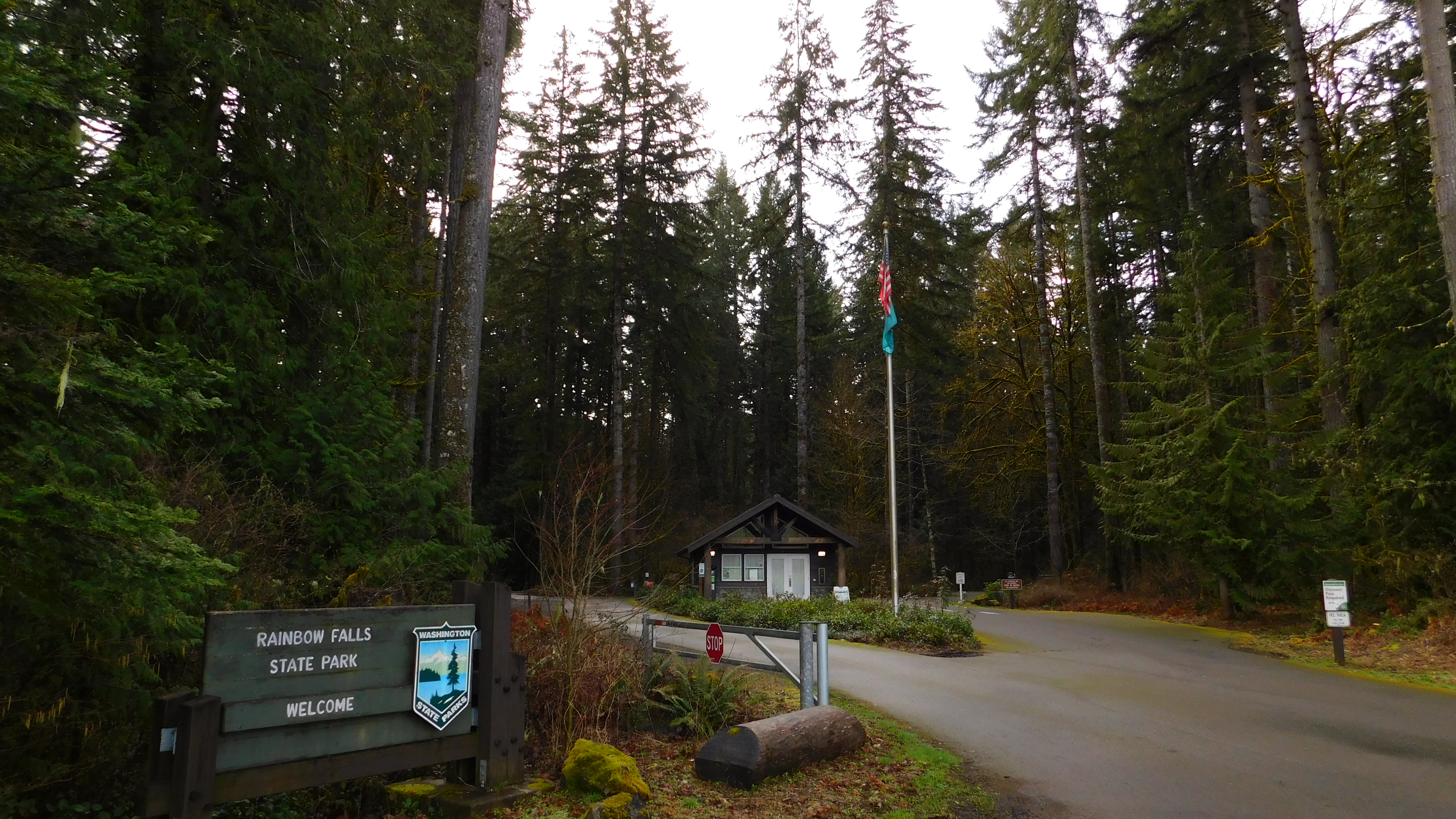
Main entrance, 2025

Rainbow Falls State Park is located on State Route 6 approximately 17 miles (27 km) west of Chehalis and is near the Willapa Hills Trail.

The falls at the park, after the 2007 flood, are measured to be 5 feet (1.5 m) in height. The park covers 129 acres (52 ha) (Note: Multiple reports on the park before and after the 2007 flood mention the grounds to be 139 acres (56 ha) in size. See sources throughout the article for the discrepancy.) and features 3,900 feet (1,200 m) of shoreline. The grounds are home to some of the last standing old-growth trees in the Chehalis Valley.

== Geology ==
The area, 50 million years ago, was originally an inland sea and covered in sandstone. A lava flow that began in Oregon created the falls approximately 17 million years ago. The falls are located on the Chehalis River and the waters pour over basalt rock.

== Ecology ==
Rainbow Falls State Park contains a variety of old growth trees, including Douglas fir, hemlock, and western red cedar. Big leaf maples and red alder also grow on the grounds but in smaller quantities. Edible plants, including types of Indian lettuce and mushrooms, are located in the park. Animals in the area include deer and elk. Depending on the season, fish such as trout and steelhead are found in the river.

The park is host to a fuchsia garden of 40 different species of the plant.

== Activities and amenities ==
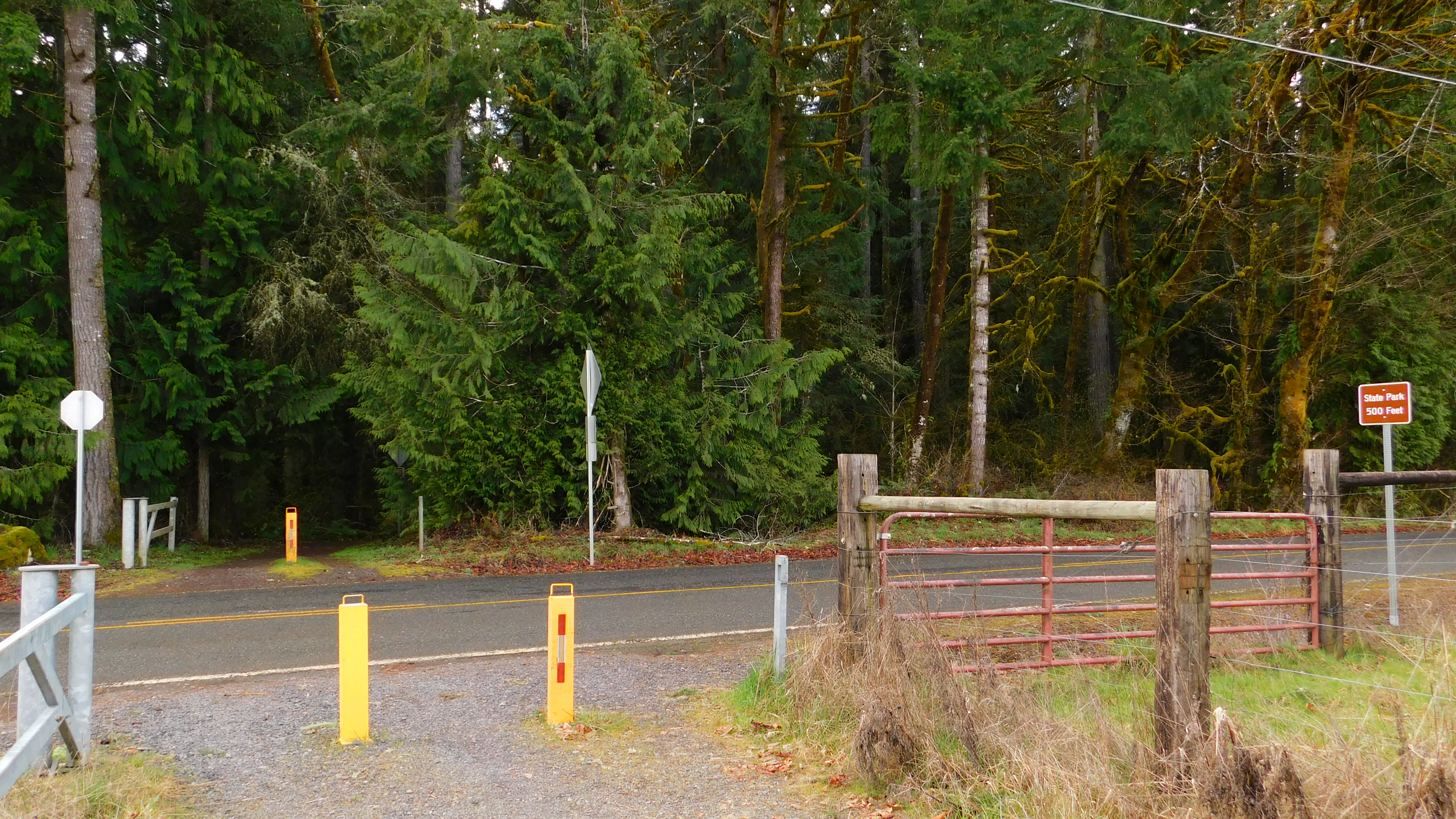
Willapa Hills Trail spur, 2025

The 129-acre (52 ha) park offers camping, fishing, and swimming, and contains 3 miles (4.8 km) of hiking trails in the main campground. An interpretive path known as the Towering Timber Trail has trees up to 200 feet (61.0 m) tall. An additional 7 miles (11 km) of trails are located on the southern end of the park, across the highway. The looping trails are flat and are not wheelchair accessible. Visitors to the park can access the 56-mile Willapa Hills Trail via a spur trail; the spur is maintained as part of Rainbow Falls State Park.

The annual Pe Ell River Run ends at the park. Held since 1978, the event consists of entrants buying or building water crafts and floating down the Chehalis River from Pe Ell. Riders can float over the waterfall that still remains in the park despite severe flooding damage due to the Great Coastal Gale of 2007.

== See also ==
- List of Washington state parks
