= James A. Wright (Wisconsin politician) =

20th century American politician

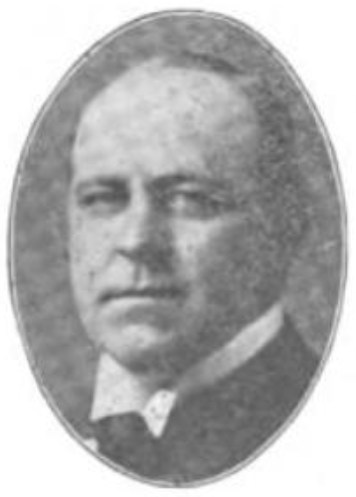

Member of the Wisconsin Senate from the 30th district
- In office January 2, 1905 – December 21, 1911 (death)
- Preceded by: Daniel E. Riordan
- Succeeded by: Willard T. Stevens

Personal details
- Born: June 17, 1873 Racine, Wisconsin, U.S.
- Died: December 21, 1911 (aged 38) Merrill, Wisconsin, U.S.
- Cause of death: Typhoid fever
- Resting place: Mound Cemetery, Racine
- Party: Republican
- Spouse: none
- Children: none
- Occupation: Businessman, politician

James A. Wright (June 17, 1873 – December 21, 1911) was an American businessman and politician from the U.S. state of Wisconsin. He was a member of the Wisconsin Senate, representing much of northern Wisconsin from 1905 until his death in 1911.

== Biography ==
Born in Racine, Wisconsin, Wright moved with his family to Merrill, Wisconsin. He went to the Merrill public schools. Wright then went to Dixon Business College and the Northern Illinois State Normal School. He was involved with his family's lumber business in Merrill, Wisconsin: H. W. Wright Lumber Company. In 1904, Wright organized the Wisconsin Lumber Company in Littell, Washington. Wright was also involved with the banking business. From 1905 until his death in 1911, Wright served in the Wisconsin State Senate and was a Republican. Wright died of typhoid fever at his home in Merrill, Wisconsin.
