= Frances, Washington =

Unincorporated community in Washington, United States

Frances
- Unincorporated community
- Location within the state of Washington
- Coordinates: 46°32′30″N 123°30′09″W
- Country: United States
- State: Washington
- County: Pacific
- Elevation: 233 ft (71 m)
- Time zone: UTC-8 (Pacific (PST))
  - Summer (DST): UTC-7 (PDT)
- GNIS feature ID: 1512226

Frances is an unincorporated community in Pacific County, Washington, United States. Frances is located along State Route 6 east of the community of Lebam. Frances and surrounding areas are part of an area heavily affected by the logging industry.
