= Adna, Washington =

Unincorporated community in Washington, United States

- Unincorporated community
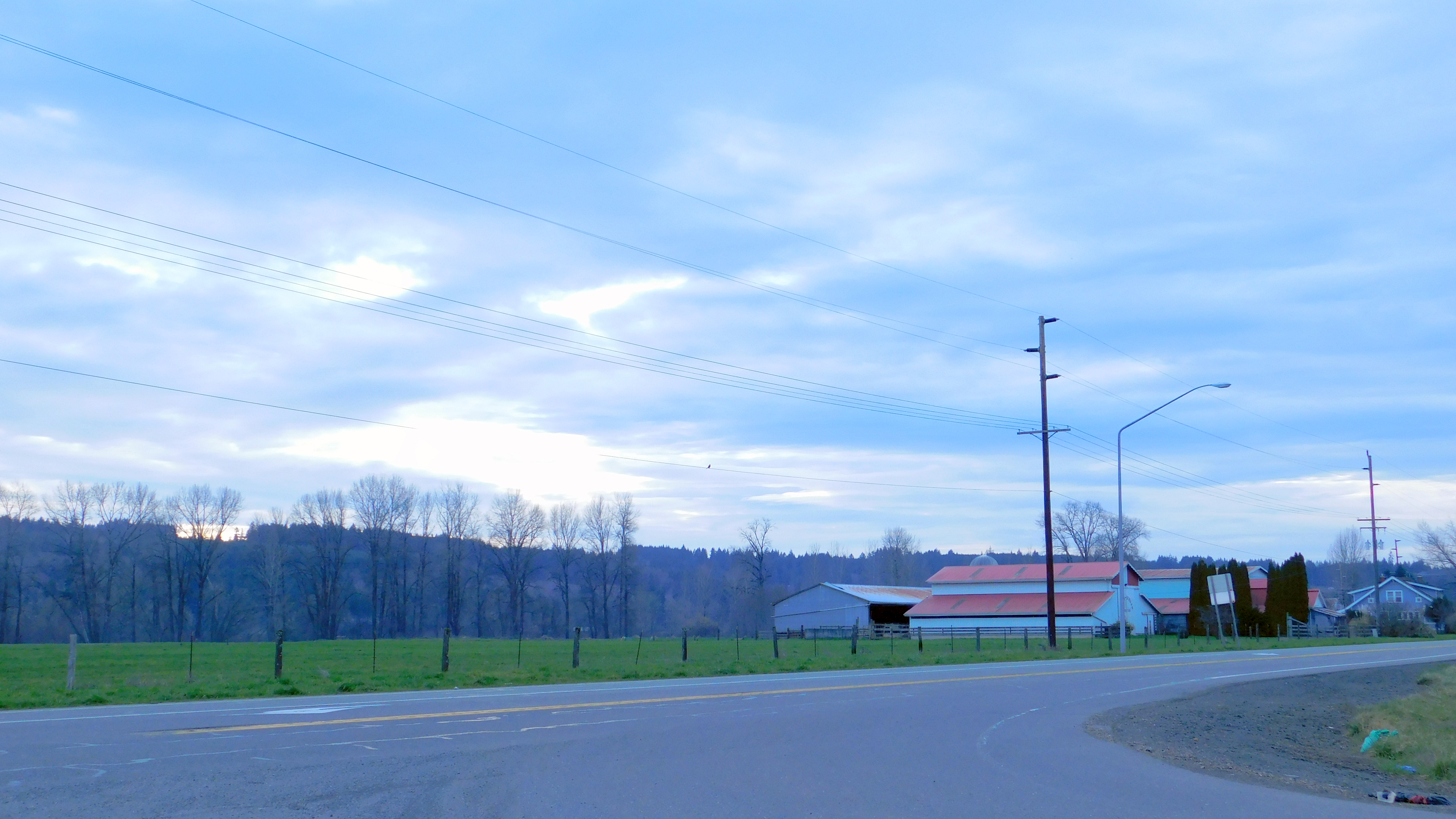
- Ulrich-Schuler Barn at the Adna exit off Washington State Route 6

- Location within Washington (state) Location within the United States
- Coordinates: 46°37′44″N 123°03′40″W
- Country: United States
- State: Washington
- County: Lewis
- Established: 1894
- Elevation: 184 ft (56 m)
- Time zone: UTC-8 (Pacific (PST))
  - Summer (DST): UTC-7 (PDT)
- ZIP Code: 98522, 98532
- Area code(s): 360, 564
- GNIS feature ID: 1502945

Adna is an unincorporated community located in Lewis County, Washington.

== Etymology ==
An early resident, J.G. Browning named the town "Willoway" for the saying "Where there's a will, there's a way", the favorite saying of his wife, Edna. In 1892, the town's name was changed by the railroad to Pamona to distinguish it from the Willapa townsite. However, the town was required to change the name again as another Pomona, Washington existed.

Two different versions for arriving at the current, official name are recorded. Historical archives indicate that the moniker was chosen as "Edna", after Edna Browning, with the first letter subsequently changed because a post office, Edna, was already in use. Other research has the town renamed by a railway superintendent on behalf of a family member, Adna Marian, in 1894.

== History ==
During the Great Coastal Gale of 2007, downtown Adna was inundated with rushing floodwaters approximately 4.5 feet (1.4 m) high. Batting cages at the high school were used as a command center during the flood.

== Geography ==
Adna is located next to the Chehalis River and is six miles (9.7 km) southwest of Chehalis. The town of Littell is 1.5 miles to the east. The town straddles Washington State Route 6.

== Parks and recreation ==
Situated next to Adna High School is Back Memorial County Park. The grounds were donated by the Back family in 1978 and the 5.0-acre (2.0 ha) grounds have hosted a softball tournament that raises scholarships in memory of a local coach. The park was temporarily used by the high school football team in the early 1980s when the stadium was being rebuilt. It is home to ballfields and a small running track.

To the southeast of the community is Rose County Park. Locally shortened to Rose Park, the area is 21.0 acres (8.5 ha) and contains picnic facilities, playgrounds, and a 0.4-mile (0.64 km) hiking path that was outfitted as a fitness trail. Both parks are under the oversight of the Lewis County Parks and Recreation Department and maintenance for Back Memorial is handled by the local Lions Club.

A paved parking lot and trailhead are located in Adna for access to the Willapa Hills Trail.

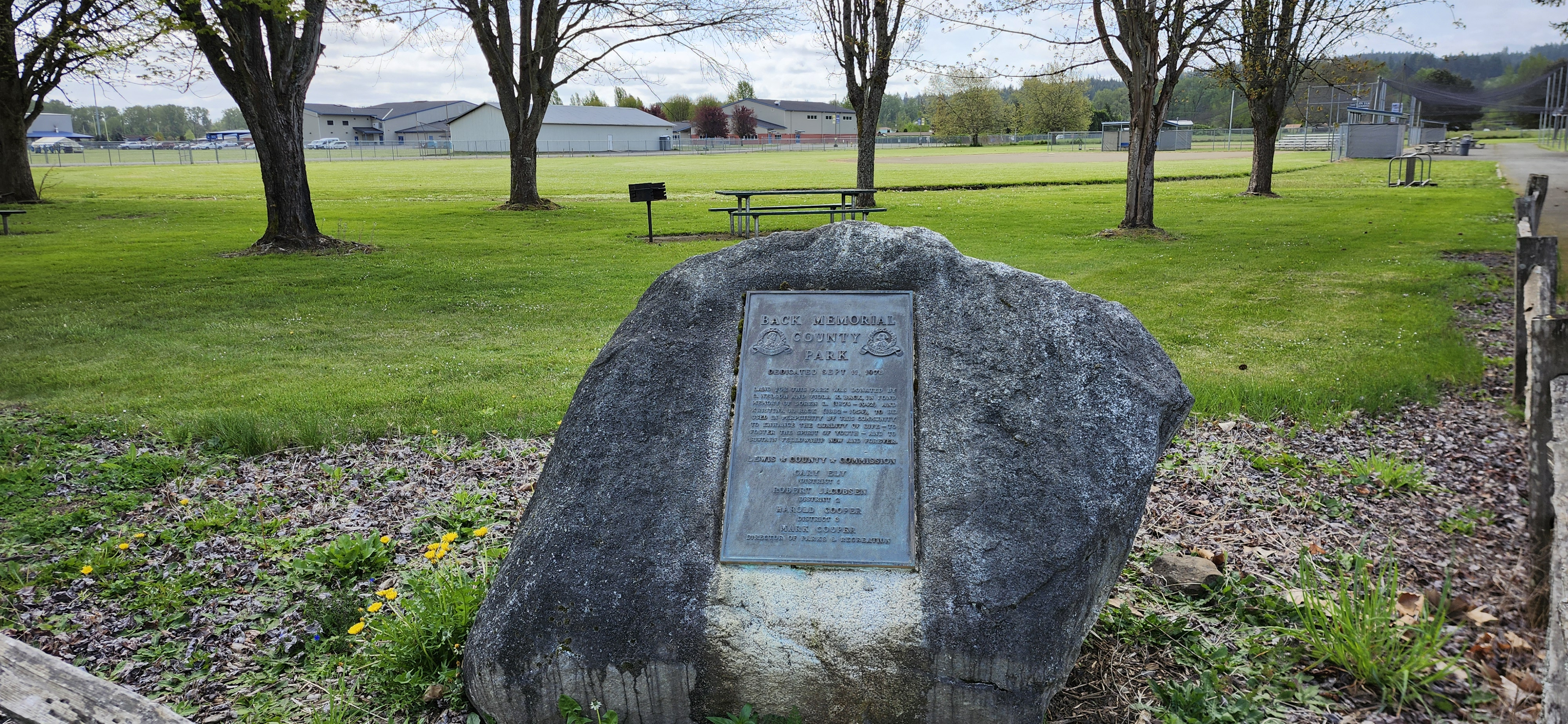
Back Memorial County Park, 2025

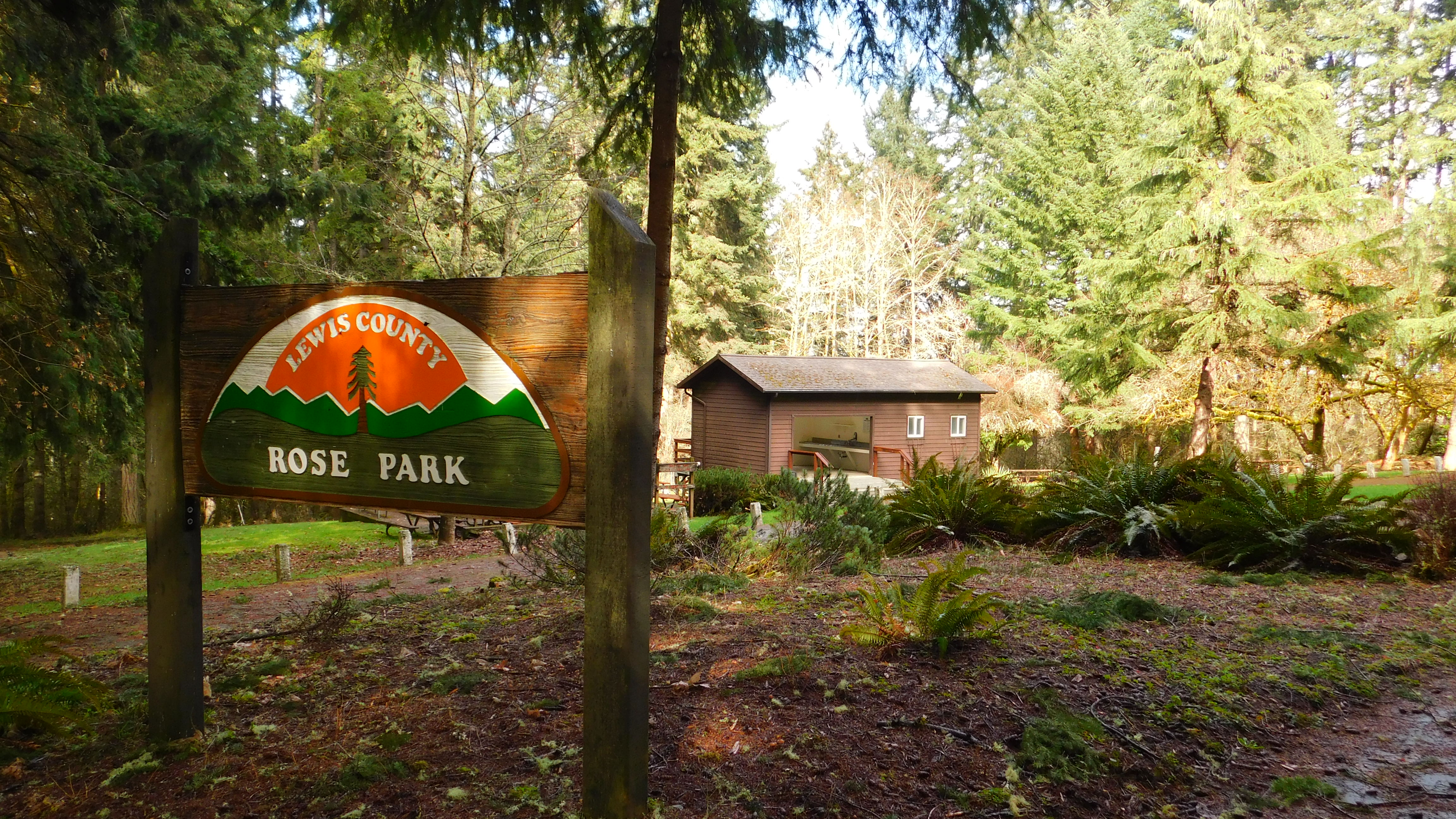
Rose County Park, 2025

== Government and politics ==
Presidential Elections Results
Year	Republican	Democratic	Third parties
2008	65.2% 578	32.6% 289	2.3% 20
2012	69.4% 637	28.9% 265	1.7% 16
2016	72.8% 677	21.2% 197	6.0% 56
2020	72.5% 838	23.8% 275	2.9% 33
2024	71.9% 844	23.7% 278	4.4% 52

=== Politics ===
The 2020 election included votes for candidates of the Libertarian Party and there were 10 votes for write-in candidates. In the 2024 election, there were 12 votes cast for write-in candidates and 27 votes were tallied for Robert F. Kennedy Jr..

== Education ==
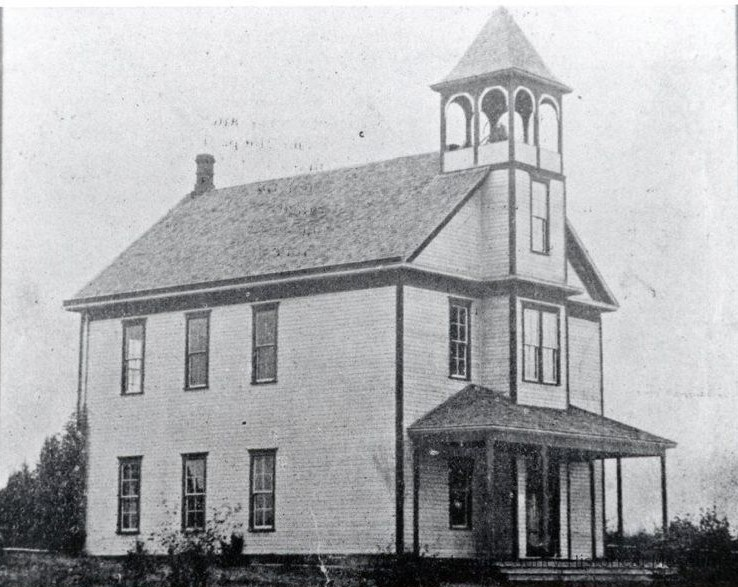
Adna schoolhouse, ca. 1890

Adna is home to the Adna School District, which includes two schools, Adna Elementary and Adna Middle/High School. One of the first schools to serve Adna was built in 1893 and was known as the Bell Tower School. The high school football field was constructed by the Works Progress Administration (WPA) in the 1930s on the site of the original Adna High School.

In the aftermath of the 2007 floods, a 340-page book titled, This Flood Happened, was created out of short stories and pictures produced by Adna elementary students that personally described the event, including such topics as rescue operations or the loss of their homes or pets. The collection, released in summer 2008, involved all 285 pupils at the time and approximately 20 teachers and staff.

=== Sports ===
As of 2025, the high school girls softball team has won the state championship 12 times, seven in Class 2B since the level began in 2002. Championship runs include back-to-back titles in 1994-1995 and a three-peat from 2023-2025. The Adna team was the first to accomplish three consecutive titles in Class 2B play and the third team overall in the state regardless of classification. Other title years include 2011, 2015, and 2019.

The Adna football team won the state championship in 1989. The baseball team won the 2B state title in 2015.

== Infrastructure ==
A broadband project, authorized due to a $12 million Washington State Broadband Office grant given to the Lewis County PUD, is to be installed in the Bunker Creek area around Adna. The placement of fiber-optic cable and other components will stretch along and across State Route 6 and is expected to begin in 2024 and completed in 2026.

The post office is located in the Adna Grocery building.
