= Washington State Route 6 =

State highway in Washington, United States

State Route 6
- SR 6 highlighted in red

Route information
- Maintained by WSDOT
- Length: 51.37 mi (82.67 km)
- Existed: 1964–present

Major junctions
- West end: US 101 in Raymond
- East end: I-5 / US 12 in Chehalis

Location
- Country: United States
- State: Washington
- Counties: Pacific, Lewis

Highway system
- State highways in Washington; Interstate; US; State; Scenic; Pre-1964; 1964 renumbering; Former
← I-5	→ SR 7

State Route 6 (SR 6) is a 51.37-mile (82.67 km) long state highway in Pacific and Lewis counties in the U.S. state of Washington. The highway, which extends from U.S. Route 101 (US 101) in Raymond east to Interstate 5 (I-5), co-signed with US 12, in Chehalis. Major communities located on the highway include Raymond, Pe Ell, Adna and Chehalis. The first state highway that used the current route of SR 6 was State Road 19, established in 1913. State Road 19 became State Road 12 in 1923, which became Primary State Highway 12 (PSH 12) in 1937. In 1964, PSH 12 became SR 6 and since, three minor construction projects have been arranged, only two have been completed.

== Route description ==
SR 6 begins at an intersection with U.S. Route 101 (US 101) in Downtown Raymond as Henkle Street. Paralleling the basic route of the Willapa River, the highway turns southeast to leave Raymond and become unnamed. Continuing past Menlo, the roadway realigns directly south to Holcomb before curving back eastward to Lebam and Frances to exit Pacific County and enter Lewis County. Once in Lewis County, the Willapa River ends in the Willapa Hills, while the road turns northeast and later east into Pe Ell. In Pe Ell, SR 6 is named 4th Avenue and crosses the Chehalis River, while the highway is once again unnamed at the Main Street intersection. At the Main Street intersection, the roadway is realigned north to Doty and east to Dryad and Rainbow Falls State Park, where the road goes south and curves northeast to Adna. In Adna, SR 6 starts to parallel a railroad owned by the Port of Chehalis and operated by the Puget Sound and Pacific Railroad and then the highway crosses the Chehalis River again. The road leaves the community and continues thru Littell, then into Claquato, intersecting the former SR 603. After crossing the Chehalis River for the final time into Chehalis, the roadway ends at a diamond interchange with Interstate 5 (I-5), co-signed with US 12. The busiest segment of SR 6 in 2007 was the I-5 / US 12 interchange in Chehalis, with an estimated daily average of 13,000 motorists. In 1970, the busiest segment was the US 101 intersection in Raymond, with an estimated daily average of 4,800 motorists.

== History ==
The first state highway to be designated on the modern corridor of SR 6 was State Road 19, which was designated in 1913. A gravel road was built through the Willapa Hills in 1917, but had steep switchbacks and frequent damage from storms. During a 1923 renumbering of the state road system, State Road 19 became State Road 12, which ran from Megler north to Raymond and east to Chehalis. Primary State Highway 12 (PSH 12) replaced State Road 12 when the Primary state highways were created in 1937; PSH 12 didn't begin in Megler, but began in Kelso. Between Raymond and Chehalis, PSH 12 was paralleled by numerous railroads that have changed over time. In 1951, the Northern Pacific Railway followed the route from Raymond to Chehalis, but by 1958, the Pe Ell Prairie Railroad replaced Northern Pacific from Pe Ell to Dryad and the Chehalis Western Railroad, now the Chehalis Western Trail, replaced Northern Pacific between Adna and Chehalis. In 1968, the Chehalis Western Railroad no longer operated in the Adna area and the last railroad to parallel current SR 6 was the Puget Sound and Pacific Railroad, which runs from Adna to Chehalis. During the 1964 highway renumbering, PSH 12 was split into US 830, US 101 and SR 6. The only other highway to intersect SR 6 was SR 603, the only auxiliary route of the highway, which was established in 1964 and decommissioned in 1991.

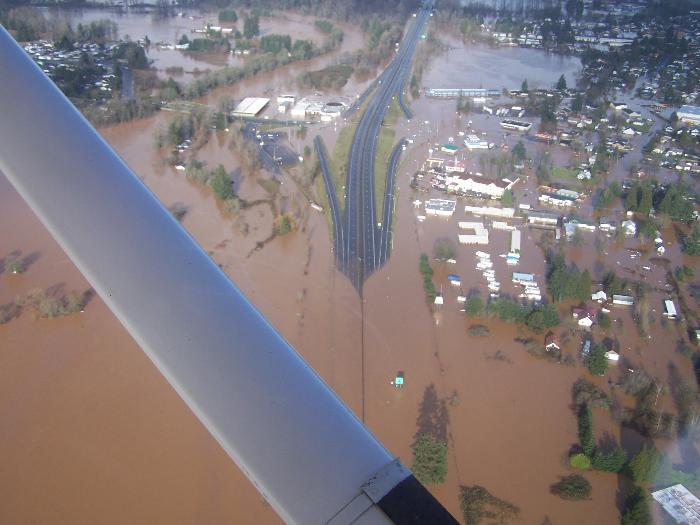
During the Great Coastal Gale of 2007, the I-5 interchange in Chehalis was flooded.

Following a major winter storm in December 2007, an 8-mile (13 km) section of SR 6 near Pe Ell was closed due to landslides and an unstable slope above the highway. The roadway was reopened for limited access by the end of the month while work began on clearing debris on the unstable slope. The section fully reopened to traffic on March 16, 2008. During the stabilization of the slope near Pe Ell, similar work started in February on another slope located near Frances that was finished in late April.

The highway's 22-foot-wide (6.7 m) bridge over the South Fork of the Chehalis River west of Chehalis was originally built in 1925 and was replaced by the state government in 2009. The new bridge, measuring 40 feet (12 m) wide, was constructed to the north of the existing structure and was opened to traffic in September 2009. The project was the first of four bridge replacements on SR 6 that were funded by the 2005 transportation package.

Construction of a $3.3 million pedestrian bridge over the highway in Littell began in 2021 and was completed in 2023. It carries a section of the Willapa Hills Trail and was named the Littell Bridge. A 6.0-mile (9.7 km) section near Adna was for Justin R. Schaffer, a member of the Washington State Patrol (WSP) who died while on duty; he graduated high school in Adna.

== Major intersections ==
County	Location	mi	km	Destinations	Notes
Pacific	Raymond	0.00	0.00	US 101 – Aberdeen, South Bend	Roundabout
Lewis		49.08	78.99	Old Highway 603 – Napavine, Winlock	Former SR 603
Lewis	Chehalis	51.37	82.67	I-5 / US 12 – Seattle, Portland	Interchange
1.000 mi = 1.609 km; 1.000 km = 0.621 mi
