= List of rail trails in Washington =

This List of rail trails in Washington lists former railroad right-of-ways in Washington state that have been converted to rail trails for public use, or rail corridors where rails coexist with trail.

== Western Washington ==
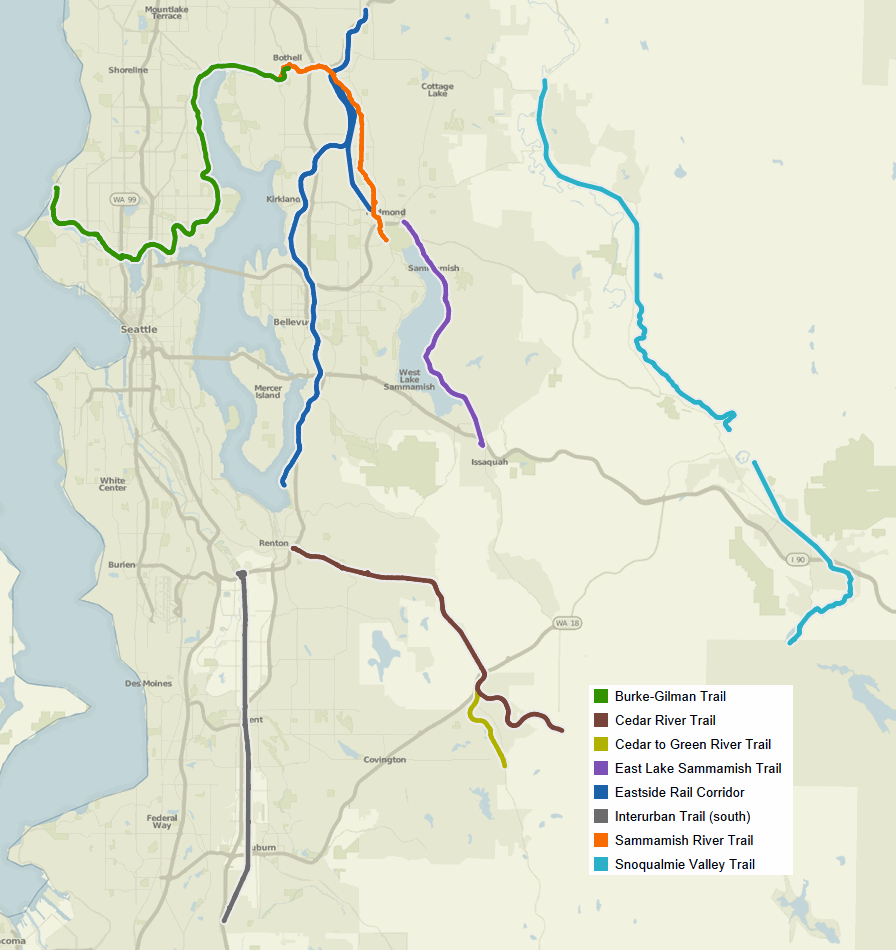
Map of rail trails in King County.

- Burke Gilman Trail - Seattle and suburbs
- Cascade Trail - Skagit County
- Cedar River Trail - King County
- Cedar to Green River Trail - King County
- Centennial Trail - Snohomish County
- Chehalis Western Trail - Thurston County
- Cross Kirkland Corridor - King County
- East Lake Sammamish Trail - King County
- Eastside Rail Corridor - King County
- Foothills Trail - Pierce County
- Gate to Belmore Trail - Thurston County
- Interurban Trail (King County) - King County
- Interurban Trail (Snohomish County) - Snohomish County
- Interurban Trail (Whatcom County) - Bellingham & Whatcom County
- Issaquah-Preston Trail and Preston-Snoqualmie Trail - eastern King County
- Karen Fraser Woodland Trail - Thurston County
- Olympic Discovery Trail
- Sammamish River Trail - King County
- Snoqualmie Valley Regional Trail - King County
- Whitehorse Trail - Snohomish County - ties into the Centennial Trail
- Willapa Hills Trail - Chehalis to South Bend
- Yelm-Rainier-Tenino Trail - Thurston County

== Cross-Cascades ==
- Iron Horse State Park - also known as the "Iron Horse Trail" and John Wayne Pioneer Trail which continues east from Vantage

== Eastern Washington ==
- Bill Chipman Palouse Trail in Whitman County connects Pullman, Washington, with Moscow, Idaho, in the Palouse region
- Columbia Plateau Trail - Spokane to Pasco; Spokane city segment known as Fish Lake Trail
- Ferry County Rail Trail - Republic to Canada–US border at Danville
- Palouse to Cascades State Park Trail - formerly John Wayne Pioneer Trail, extends from the Idaho border to the western slopes of the Cascade Mountains
- Klickitat Trail - Klickitat County
- Spokane River Centennial Trail - Spokane
