= Littell, Washington =

Unincorporated community in Washington, United States

- Unincorporated community
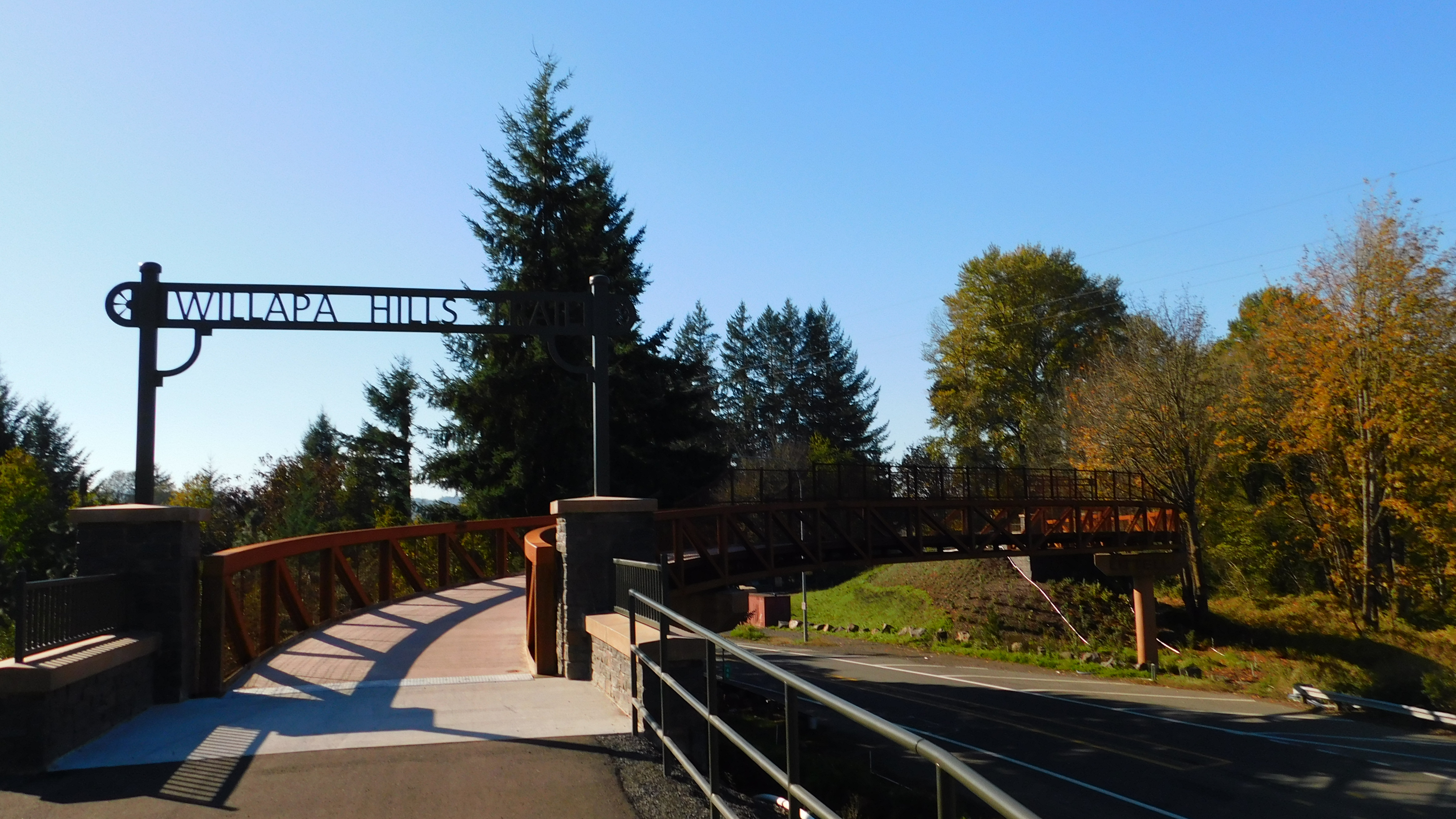
- Willapa Hills Trail pedestrian bridge, Littell, Washington 2023

- Location within Washington (state) Location within the United States
- Coordinates: 46°38′12″N 123°02′07″W
- Country: United States
- State: Washington
- County: Lewis
- Elevation: 200 ft (61 m)
- Time zone: UTC-8 (Pacific (PST))
  - Summer (DST): UTC-7 (PDT)
- ZIP Code: 98532
- Area code(s): 360, 564

Littell is an unincorporated community in Lewis County, Washington, United States, located off Washington State Route 6 between the towns of Adna and Claquato.

The Willapa Hills Trail passes through the area.

== History ==
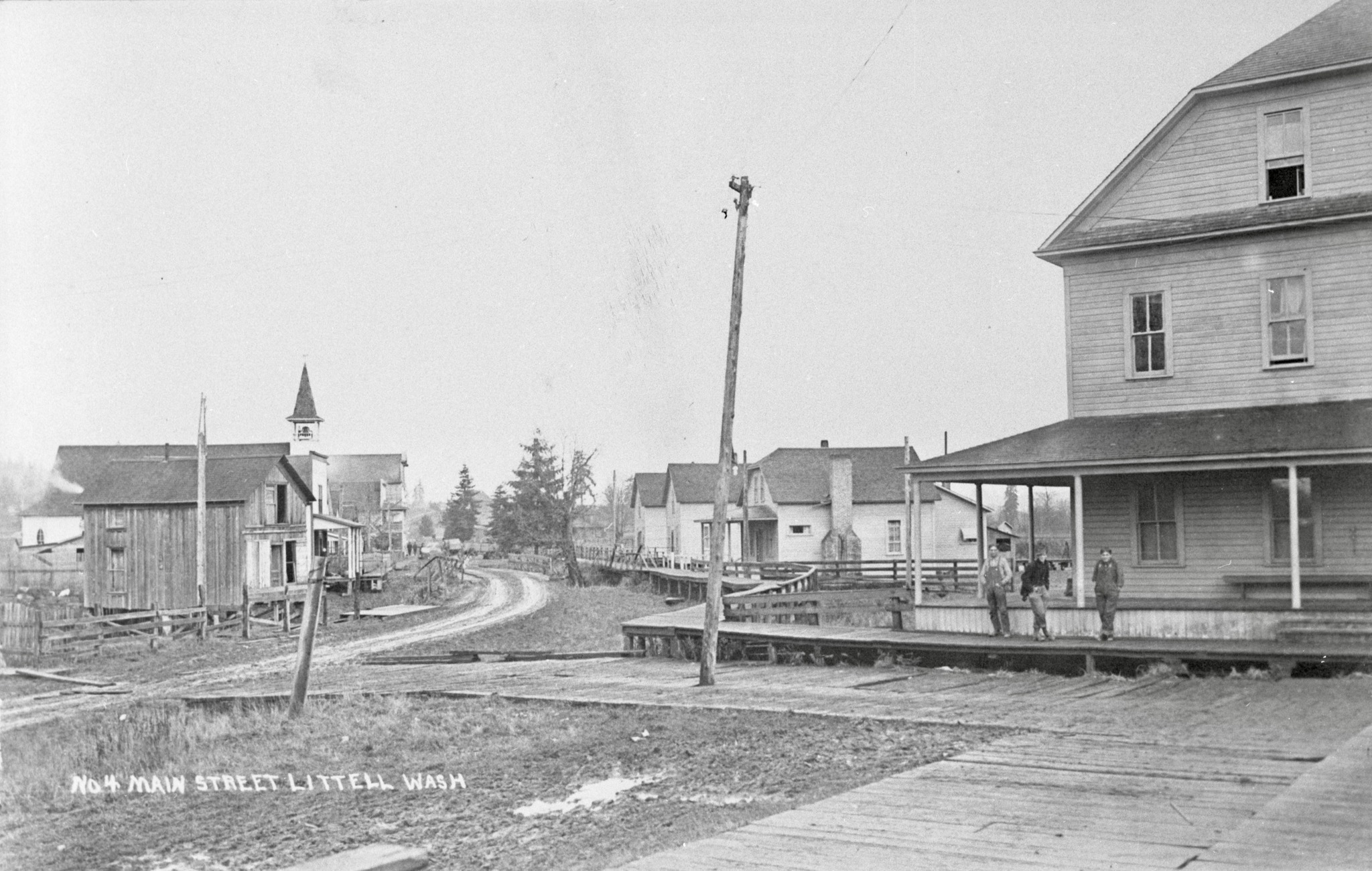
Downtown Littell, ca. 1911

There are two stories of the town's origin. A manager of the Hill Logging Company, Harry J. Syverson, asserted in 1912 to have founded the town. However, there are sourced claims that a local businessman, Curt Littell, agreed to call the post office by his name in 1902.

A post office was moved from the nearby town of Claquato in 1903, and an opera house was built in the town in 1904.

The community was known for its timber production, having two sawmills during its peak at the beginning of the 20th century. Littell grew large enough to contain a school and church, and had a large Japanese population, many of whom were employed by the mills. After a destructive fire to one mill in 1911, the second mill closed, and the town began to wane, leaving a few residents. Most of the original buildings and its downtown core are lost.

A pedestrian bridge in Littell was built starting in 2021. The span would allow users of the Willapa Hills Trail to pass over the highway to lessen vehicular accidents. The $3.3 million project was completed in June 2023 and the overpass was named in honor of the community.

== Notable people ==
- Roy Huggins, producer, screenwriter, creator of television series The Rockford Files, The Fugitive and Maverick; born in Littell
- James A. Wright, Wisconsin state senator and lumberman; president of the Wisconsin Lumber Company located in Littell; organized the company in 1904
