= Indian lettuce =

The name Indian lettuce has been used to refer to a number of plants used as leaf vegetables used by Native American or Indian people, including but likely not limited to:

- Lactuca indica
- Claytonia perfoliata
- Claytonia sibirica (candy flower)
- Chenopodium californicum
