= Walville, Washington =

Ghost town in Washington (state)

- Ghost town
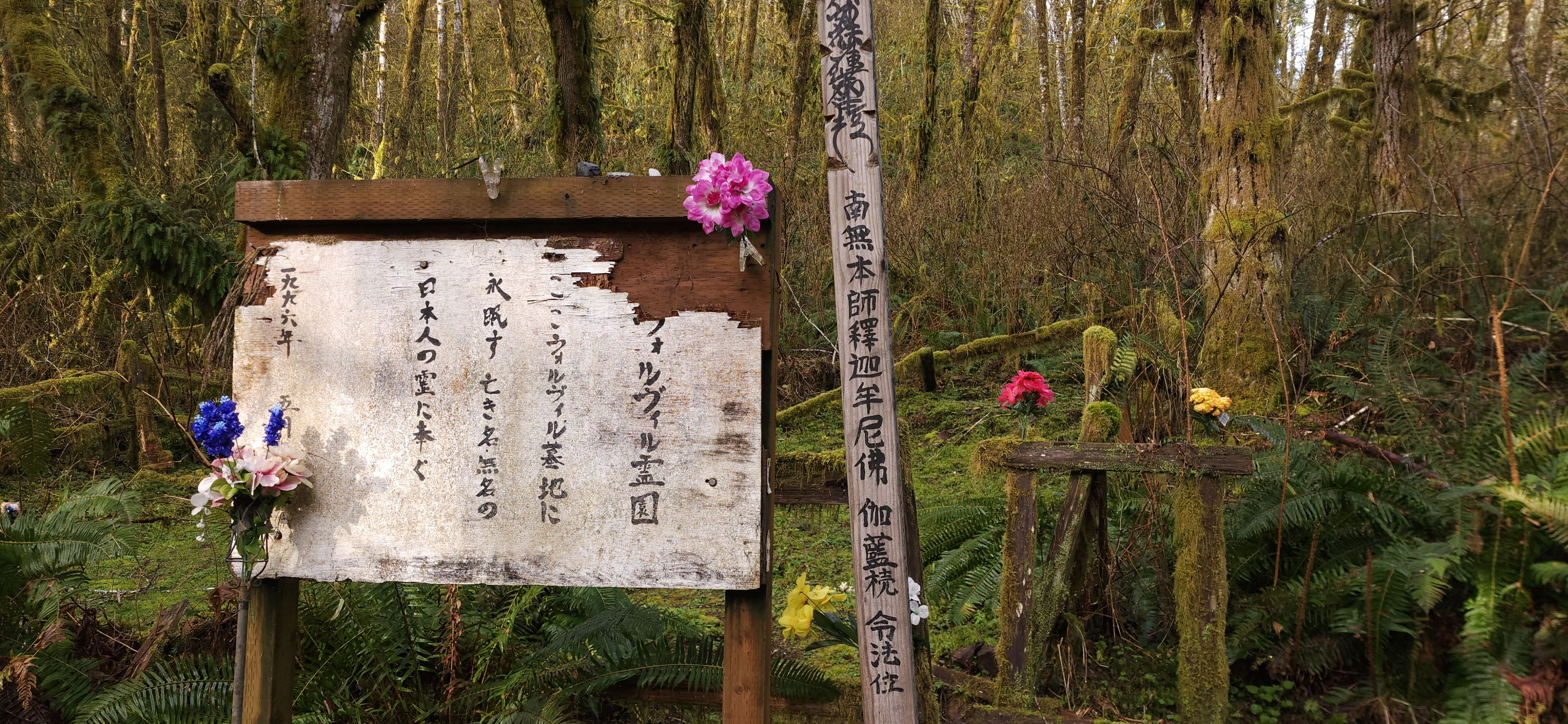
- Walville Japanese Cemetery, 2025

- Location within Washington (state) Location within the United States
- Coordinates: 46°33′10″N 123°21′19″W
- Country: United States
- State: Washington
- County: Lewis
- Established: 1903
- Time zone: UTC-8 (Pacific (PST))
  - Summer (DST): UTC-7 (PDT)

Walville is an extinct town in Lewis County, in the U.S. state of Washington. The GNIS classifies it as a populated place.

== History ==
A community began in the late 19th and early 20th century around a sawmill site under operations by the Rock Creek Lumber Company. Ownership changed several times over the course of a few years, including oversight of the McCormick Lumber Compamny, namesake of McCormick, Washington. A post office called Walville was established in 1903, and remained in operation until 1936. The community's name is an amalgamation of Walworth and Neville Company.

The community rested on the county line separating Lewis County and Pacific County, splitting the town in half, including the Walworth and Neville sawmill. By approximately 1930, the sawmill, due to financial hardships seen around the region, closed and the town began to wane. By the early 1950s, only six homes were occupied.

== Education ==
Both Lewis and Pacific counties required a school in the community and the county dividing line issue caused several problems. A myth exists mentioning that one house, split by the county line, required one student to attend classes at a Pacific County schoolhouse while their sibling was enrolled at a school in Lewis. The situation was resolved by the creation of an early Pe Ell school district that overlapped the county line.
