= Menlo, Washington =

Unincorporated community in Washington, United States

Menlo
- Unincorporated community
- Location within the state of Washington
- Coordinates: 46°37′17″N 123°38′50″W
- Country: United States
- State: Washington
- County: Pacific
- Elevation: 69 ft (21 m)
- Time zone: UTC-8 (Pacific (PST))
  - Summer (DST): UTC-7 (PDT)
- GNIS feature ID: 1512454

Menlo is a small unincorporated community in the Willapa Valley of Pacific County, Washington, United States. The community is home to a general store and post office, the Pacific County Fairgrounds and a secondary/high school, Willapa Valley High School.

== History ==
Menlo was settled in 1851 as a donation land claim. The area was named for the California town of Menlo Park in 1893 when the Northern Pacific Railway line was laid down through the Willapa Valley. It was shortened to Menlo when the sign was cut in half.

In 1936, Menlo's tiny Valley High School won the Washington state high school basketball championship at the University of Washington Pavilion.

== Demographics ==
As Menlo is not a census-designated place, only approximate population information is available for the area; Menlo is located within the Willapa Valley School District, which has a population of 2,231 and covers 289.1 square miles. Menlo is located within Census Tract 9504 of Pacific County, which has a population of 3,921 and covers a larger area than the Willapa Valley School District.

== Climate ==
This region experiences warm (but not hot) and dry summers, with no average monthly temperatures above 71.6 °F. According to the Köppen Climate Classification system, Menlo has a warm-summer Mediterranean climate, abbreviated "Csb" on climate maps.

== Parks and recreation ==
The Willie Keil's Grave State Park Heritage Site is located approximately 2 miles (3.2 km) north of Menlo. The Willapa Hills Trail courses through the community.
