= Holcomb, Washington =

Unincorporated community in Washington, United States

Holcomb
- Unincorporated community
- Location within the state of Washington
- Coordinates: 46°34′19″N 123°37′03″W
- Country: United States
- State: Washington
- County: Pacific
- Elevation: 115 ft (35 m)
- Time zone: UTC-8 (Pacific (PST))
  - Summer (DST): UTC-7 (PDT)
- GNIS feature ID: 1511037

Holcomb is a small unincorporated community on Highway 6 in Pacific County, Washington, United States, about 6 miles southeast of Raymond. It was founded as a stop on the Northern Pacific Railroad line and named after a company official.
