= Lebam, Washington =

- CDP
- Location of Lebam, Washington
- Coordinates: 46°33′51″N 123°33′03″W
- Country: United States
- State: Washington
- County: Pacific

Area
  - Total: 1.5 sq mi (3.8 km^{2})
  - Land: 1.5 sq mi (3.8 km^{2})
  - Water: 0 sq mi (0.0 km^{2})
- Elevation: 210 ft (64 m)

Population (2020)
  - Total: 150
  - Density: 100/sq mi (39/km^{2})
- Time zone: UTC-8 (Pacific (PST))
  - Summer (DST): UTC-7 (PDT)
- ZIP Code: 98554
- Area code(s): 360, 564
- FIPS code: 53-38880
- GNIS feature ID: 2408594

Lebam is a census-designated place (CDP) in Pacific County, Washington, United States. The population was 160 at the 2010 census. At the 2020 census, the population decreased to 150. 16 percent had a bachelor's degree or higher. The employment rate was 45.6 percent.

== History ==
Lebam was originally called Half Moon or Half Moon Creek. The town was later named Lebam, the reversed spelling of early settler J.W. Goodell's daughter's name, Mabel.

== Geography ==
According to the United States Census Bureau, the CDP has a total area of 1.5 square miles (3.8 km^{2}), all of it land.

== Demographics ==
Historical population
Census	Pop.	Note	%±
2000	176		—
2010	160		−9.1%
2020	150		−6.2%
U.S. Decennial Census; 1990 2000 2010 2020

Lebam first appeared as a census designated place in the 2000 U.S. census.

=== Racial and ethnic composition ===
Lebam CDP, Washington – Racial and ethnic composition Note: the US Census treats Hispanic/Latino as an ethnic category. This table excludes Latinos from the racial categories and assigns them to a separate category. Hispanics/Latinos may be of any race.
Race / Ethnicity (NH = Non-Hispanic)	Pop 2000	Pop 2010	Pop 2020	% 2000	% 2010	% 2020
White alone (NH)	143	141	126	81.25%	88.13%	84.00%
Black or African American alone (NH)	0	0	0	0.00%	0.00%	0.00%
Native American or Alaska Native alone (NH)	6	3	1	3.41%	1.88%	0.67%
Asian alone (NH)	2	0	1	1.14%	0.00%	0.67%
Native Hawaiian or Pacific Islander alone (NH)	0	0	0	0.00%	0.00%	0.00%
Other race alone (NH)	0	0	1	0.00%	0.00%	0.67%
Mixed race or Multiracial (NH)	2	5	3	1.14%	3.13%	2.00%
Hispanic or Latino (any race)	23	11	18	13.07%	6.88%	12.00%
Total	176	160	150	100.00%	100.00%	100.00%

=== 2000 census ===
As of the census of 2000, there were 176 people, 77 households, and 43 families residing in the CDP. The population density was 120.2 people per square mile (46.5/km^{2}). There were 82 housing units at an average density of 56.0/sq mi (21.7/km^{2}). The racial makeup of the CDP was 84.09% White, 6.82% Native American, 1.14% Asian, 4.55% from other races, and 3.41% from two or more races. 25.4% were of German, 9.2% Polish, 9.2% Swiss, and 6.9% English ancestry according to Census 2000

There were 77 households, out of which 26.0% had children under the age of 18 living with them, 44.2% were married couples living together, 7.8% had a female householder with no husband present, and 42.9% were non-families. 35.1% of all households were made up of individuals, and 15.6% had someone living alone who was 65 years of age or older. The average household size was 2.29 and the average family size was 3.02.

In the CDP, the population was spread out, with 26.1% under the age of 18, 4.0% from 18 to 24, 27.3% from 25 to 44, 22.2% from 45 to 64, and 20.5% who were 65 years of age or older. The median age was 40 years. For every 100 females, there were 125.6 males. For every 100 females age 18 and over, there were 116.7 males.

The median income for a household in the CDP was $33,125, and the median income for a family was $40,000. Males had a median income of $45,313 versus $51,250 for females. The per capita income for the CDP was $15,831. About 8.0% of families and 11.9% of the population were below the poverty line, including 15.9% of those under the age of eighteen and 20.8% of those 65 or over. 23 of the current 160 residents carry the last name Friese, which means they make up 14% of the current population. While 7 residents carry the last name Camenzind, or about 4 percent.

== See also ==
- List of geographic names derived from anagrams and ananyms
