= Great Coastal Gale of 2007 =

Storm in the United States and Canada

Great Coastal Storm of 2007
- Satellite image of the intense third in the series of Pacific storms nearing peak intensity over the northeast Pacific, on December 2, 2007

Meteorological history
- Formed: November 29, 2007 (Dec. 3 storm)
- Dissipated: December 4, 2007 (Dec. 3 storm)

Extratropical cyclone
- Highest gusts: 147 mph (237 km/h) at Naselle Ridge, Washington
- Lowest pressure: 952 millibars (28.1 inHg) (Dec. 3 storm)

Overall effects
- Fatalities: 18
- Damage: $1.18 billion (2007 USD)
- Areas affected: Washington, Oregon, extreme Northern California, Vancouver Island, and southern British Columbia
- Part of the 2007–08 North American winter

The Great Coastal Storm of 2007 was a series of three powerful Pacific storms that affected the U.S. states of Oregon and Washington and the Canadian province of British Columbia between November 29 and December 4, 2007.

The storms on December 2 and 3 produced an extremely long-duration wind event with hurricane-force wind gusts of up to 137 mph (220 km/h) at Holy Cross, Washington, on the Pacific coast, and 129 mph (208 km/h) at Bay City on the Oregon Coast. The storm also brought heavy rains, producing widespread record flooding throughout the region, and was blamed for at least 18 deaths.

Meteorologists at the Oregon Climate Service named the storm in January 2008, drawing from the Great Gale of 1880, a similar powerful storm that affected the region in 1880.

== Meteorological synopsis ==
Map plotting the storm's track and intensity, according to the Saffir–Simpson scale Map key Saffir–Simpson scale Tropical depression (≤38 mph, ≤62 km/h) Tropical storm (39–73 mph, 63–118 km/h) Category 1 (74–95 mph, 119–153 km/h) Category 2 (96–110 mph, 154–177 km/h) Category 3 (111–129 mph, 178–208 km/h) Category 4 (130–156 mph, 209–251 km/h) Category 5 (≥157 mph, ≥252 km/h) Unknown Storm type Tropical cyclone Subtropical cyclone Extratropical cyclone, remnant low, tropical disturbance, or monsoon depression

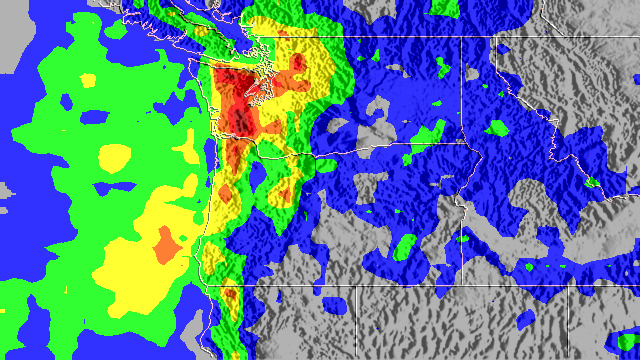
Rainfall totals from the storms, as measured by NASA's Multisatellite Precipitation Analysis from November 28 to December 4, 2007. Blue indicates 25 to 50 mm (1–2 in) and dark red indicates more than 150 millimeters (5.9 in) of rain.

On November 29, 2007, a strong low-pressure system, fed by the remnants of Typhoon Mitag and Typhoon Hagibis, formed in the central Pacific Ocean, and was carried via the Pineapple Express to the Pacific Northwest. Anticipating the storm, the National Weather Service issued its first-ever hurricane-force wind warning for the Oregon Coast.

The first of the three separate storms arrived on December 1, accompanying frigid temperatures and up to 14 inches (360 mm) of snowfall in Washington. On December 2, the second storm, which provided considerable amounts of rainfall, yet still packing cold temperatures, dumped even more snow across parts of the state, resulting in several districts in Mason County and Kitsap County to close due to heavy snow. At around 5:30 p.m., the snow began to cease, and turned into a light rain across Washington.

On December 2, the second storm made landfall on the Oregon Coast, with the hurricane-force winds and mild temperatures. In as little as two hours, temperatures across the region jumped from near freezing to above 60 °F (16 °C) in areas just as the first bands of the heavy rain were hitting. The storm moved northward through Oregon and Washington with heavy rain, including 10.78 inches (274 mm) in 24 hours in Bremerton, Washington, accompanying the wind. The rapid rise in temperature caused the recent snow to melt quickly, indicating that record flooding was imminent across much of the region. Flood warnings across five rivers in Washington were issued late in the afternoon, well before any started to rise (by the 11 p.m. nightly newscasts in Seattle, the flood warnings were updated to include every mountain-fed river in the state). The Skokomish River was the first to hit flood stage at 2:45 a.m. on December 3, as drenching rains were still pelting the area. Other rivers in the state began to flood their banks at around the same time, and images of widespread flooding began showing up on the morning newscasts of every Seattle and Portland television station.

By the morning of December 3, extreme wind speeds by the third and most powerful Pacific storm began hitting much of the WA and OR coasts with widespread peak gusts of 80–100+ mph (130–160+ km/h) at official NWS weather stations as well as unofficial stations and those run by Skywarn weather spotters. Locations which had gusts over 100 mph (160 km/h) included Naselle Ridge, Bay Center, Long Beach and Cape Disappointment in Washington and Bay City, Lincoln City, Cape Meares, Cape Blanco, Rockaway Beach, Astoria, and Tillamook in Oregon. Wind gusts up to 60–70 mph (96–112 km/h) extended southward into extreme northern California. These winds were highly centralized along the coastal sections. While Hoquiam, Washington's Bowerman Field Automated Surface Observation System was reporting winds of 87 knots (161 km/h) before it was knocked out of service, the ASOS at Olympia airport, 42 nautical miles (78 km) to the east, was largely reporting calm winds.

Many coastal residents did not receive warning of the severity of the wind event until after it had already commenced, illuminating a disconnect between Puget Sound (Seattle) television stations and the rural coast. Instead, the television stations focused much of their coverage on severe flooding in Southwest Washington.

The storm moved into British Columbia, which received heavy amounts of snow due to a previous low including the coastal sections including Vancouver, New Westminster, Surrey and Delta where snow is a rare occurrence even during the winter. The storm later weakened across the Canadian Rockies towards central Alberta and traveled through the Midwest and Middle Atlantic states on December 4–5, where light snow fell in Edmonton, Minneapolis-St. Paul, Madison, Milwaukee, Chicago, Indianapolis, Cincinnati and most of the Ohio Valley. Reports of 4 to 8 inches (100–200 mm) of snow were widespread throughout the area, with 18 inches (460 mm) of lake-effect snow recorded near Duluth, Minnesota.

== Impact ==
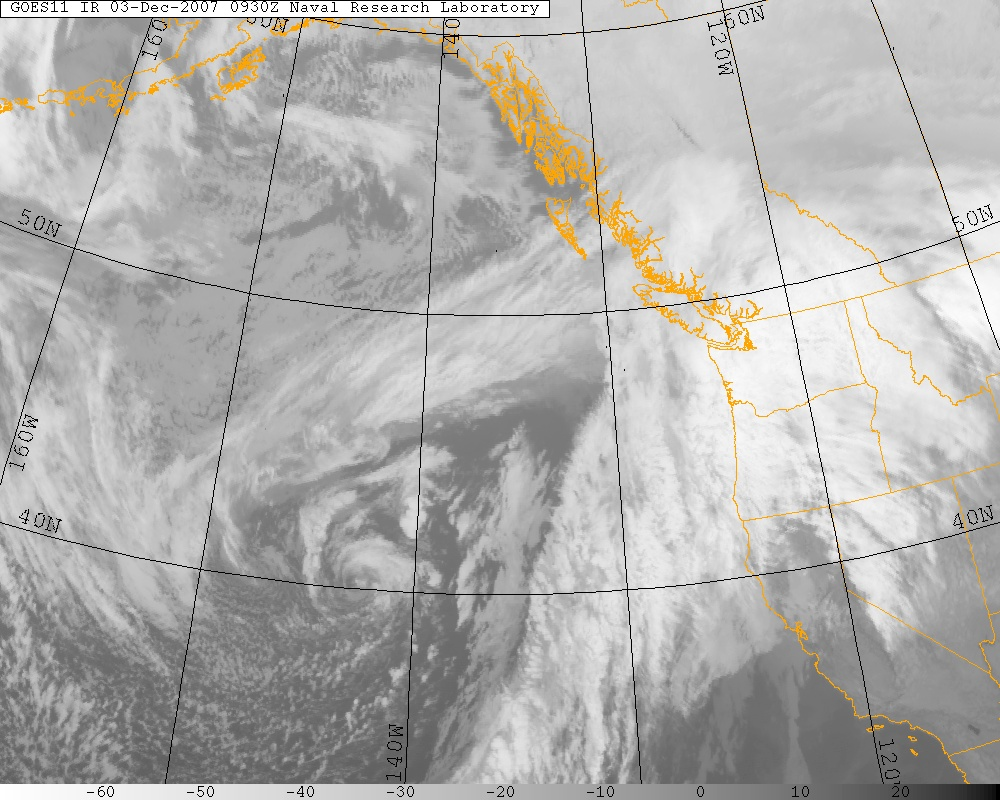
Infrared image of the main storm battering the Pacific Northwest. Image taken on December 3, 2007 at 9:30 UTC.

Across the region, at the height of the storm, 75,000 customers in Washington lost electric service, and another 36,000 in Oregon were without power. Many remained without power for several days. Nearly all of Pacific and Grays Harbor counties in Washington were without electric service after a Bonneville Power Administration high voltage transmission tower was destroyed by high wind. Crews from around the United States and British Columbia worked for weeks to repair system damage.

Numerous streets and highways were flooded and impassable, including twenty miles (32 km) of the region's main north–south artery, Interstate 5 near Chehalis, Washington, that was closed for several days because of flooding from the Chehalis River, which was under about 10 feet (3.0 m) of water; the recommended detour added about four hours and 280 miles (450 km). Amtrak train service between Portland, Oregon and Vancouver, British Columbia was also disrupted. I-5 remained closed until late Thursday December 6 when it was open to commercial traffic. It reopened to all traffic sometime the next day.

According to Washington State Governor Christine Gregoire, damages from the storms may exceed a billion dollars.

=== Oregon ===
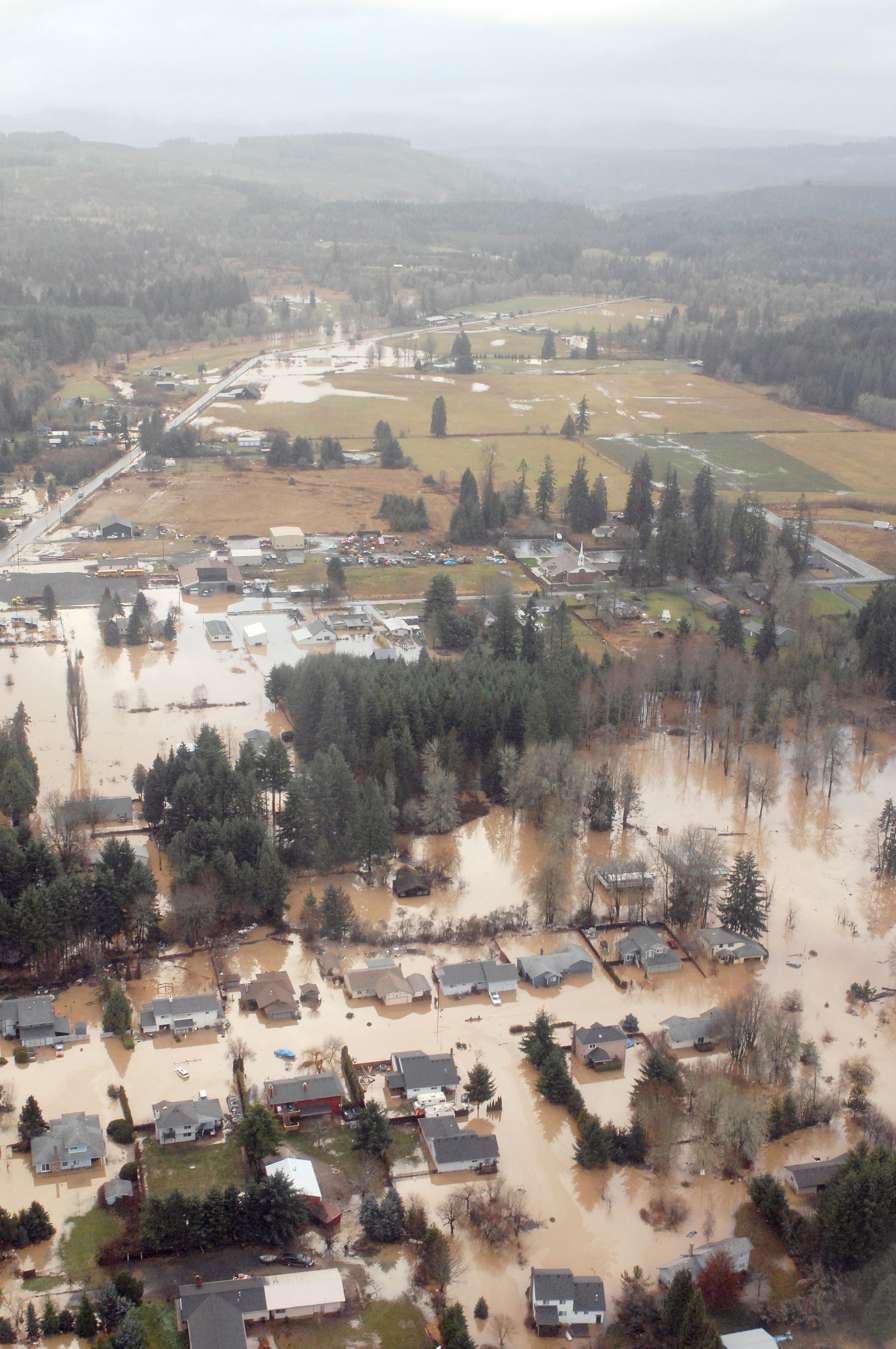
An aerial view of the flood-stricken town of Vernonia, Oregon, Dec. 4, 2007

Flooding from the Nehalem River and landslides caused the city of Vernonia to be completely cut off from the rest of Oregon. Some residents were evacuated by the Oregon National Guard.

Along the Oregon Coast, both landline and cellular phone service remained out for several days due to damaged cables. The storm's intensity was compared to the Columbus Day Storm, which caused widespread wind damage to the Pacific Northwest in October 1962, and the Willamette Valley Flood of 1996, which produced widespread flooding.

All highways between the Willamette Valley and the central and northern Oregon Coast (including U.S. Route 26, U.S. Route 30, Oregon Route 6, and Oregon Route 22) were closed for most of December 3 because of flooding, trees blocking the roadway, or landslides. Flooding and erosion in the Salmonberry River canyon severely damaged sections of the Port of Tillamook Bay Railroad, which the port later abandoned.

The storm also killed a 700-year-old Sitka spruce known as the Klootchy Creek Giant, once considered the largest sitka spruce in the world. Winds snapped the tree, a popular tourist destination along U.S. 26 east of Cannon Beach, at about 75 feet (23 m) above the ground.

On December 3, Oregon governor Ted Kulongoski declared a state of emergency for Clatsop, Columbia, Tillamook, and Yamhill counties.

On December 11, the Oregon Department of Transportation closed U.S. Route 30 five miles (8.0 km) west of Clatskanie due to landslide danger by debris-clogged Tansy Creek.

As of December 21, 2007, Washington, Clatsop, Columbia, Polk, Tillamook, and Yamhill counties were eligible for federal disaster aid. At least 5 people were killed in Oregon from the storm disaster.

Total direct public losses were about $300 million, with $62 million in infrastructure and $94.1 million in housing alone. Timber losses also account for $42 million. Indirect losses were expected to surpass direct losses by a factor of at least 5.

The television series Ax Men was shot during the storms and has footage of the damage.

=== Washington ===
In Washington, the Coast Guard used helicopters to evacuate more than 300 residents from their homes. Citing rains, flooding, landslides, road closures, and extensive property damage, Washington governor Christine Gregoire declared a state of emergency for the entire state on December 3.

Many local governments also declared a state of emergency and issued evacuation orders. The city of Bothell urged evacuation for the North Creek Business Park after flooding overtook several routes out of the business park and threatened to top over the North Creek levee in several places. Flooding overtook numerous streets and filled many parking lots through the business park. Workers for T-Mobile sandbagged parts of the levee to protect that section of the business park.

Flood waters also closed Highway 522 through Woodinville and flooded sections of downtown Woodinville after a stump blocked a culvert, sending water flooding into Little Bear Parkway. Parts of Highway 522 were damaged, leaving it with limited capacity for several days after the water receded.

Late in the afternoon on December 3, the flooding of the Chehalis River forced the closure of Interstate 5 in the Chambers Way area, and by the next day a 20-mile (32 km) stretch of the freeway was covered by as much as ten to fifteen feet (3–5 m) of water in locations. The floodwaters did not start receding until December 5. Late in the evening on December 6, the Washington State Department of Transportation reopened one lane for commercial truck traffic, following the next day with reopening all lanes of traffic.

By December 22, 2007 Clallam, Grays Harbor, King, Kitsap, Lewis, Mason, Pacific, Snohomish, and Thurston Counties were eligible for federal disaster aid. At least 8 people were killed in Washington by the storms, two in Grays Harbor County.

The storm caused at least $1 billion in damage to Washington.

=== British Columbia ===
To the north, heavy snow in the Prince George area was responsible for an accident that killed five people. Across British Columbia, several thousand homes and businesses lost power, extensive rains of well over 100 millimetres (3.9 in) and melting snows caused extensive flooding, and 15 homes were evacuated because of a rapidly rising river filled with debris near the Sea-to-Sky Highway in Strachan Point north of Vancouver. The seawall of Vancouver's Stanley Park was also damaged by a mudslide as a result of the storms, causing CAD$9 million in damage. The seawall had been reopened on November 16 after repairs in the wake of the Hanukkah Eve Windstorm of the previous December.

== See also ==
- 2007 Pacific typhoon season
- Great Gale of 1880
- Columbus Day storm of 1962
- South Valley Surprise of 2002
- Hanukkah Eve windstorm of 2006
- Global storm activity of 2006
- January 2012 Pacific Northwest snowstorm
- October 2021 Northeast Pacific bomb cyclone
- November 2024 Northeast Pacific bomb cyclone
