= Satsop River =

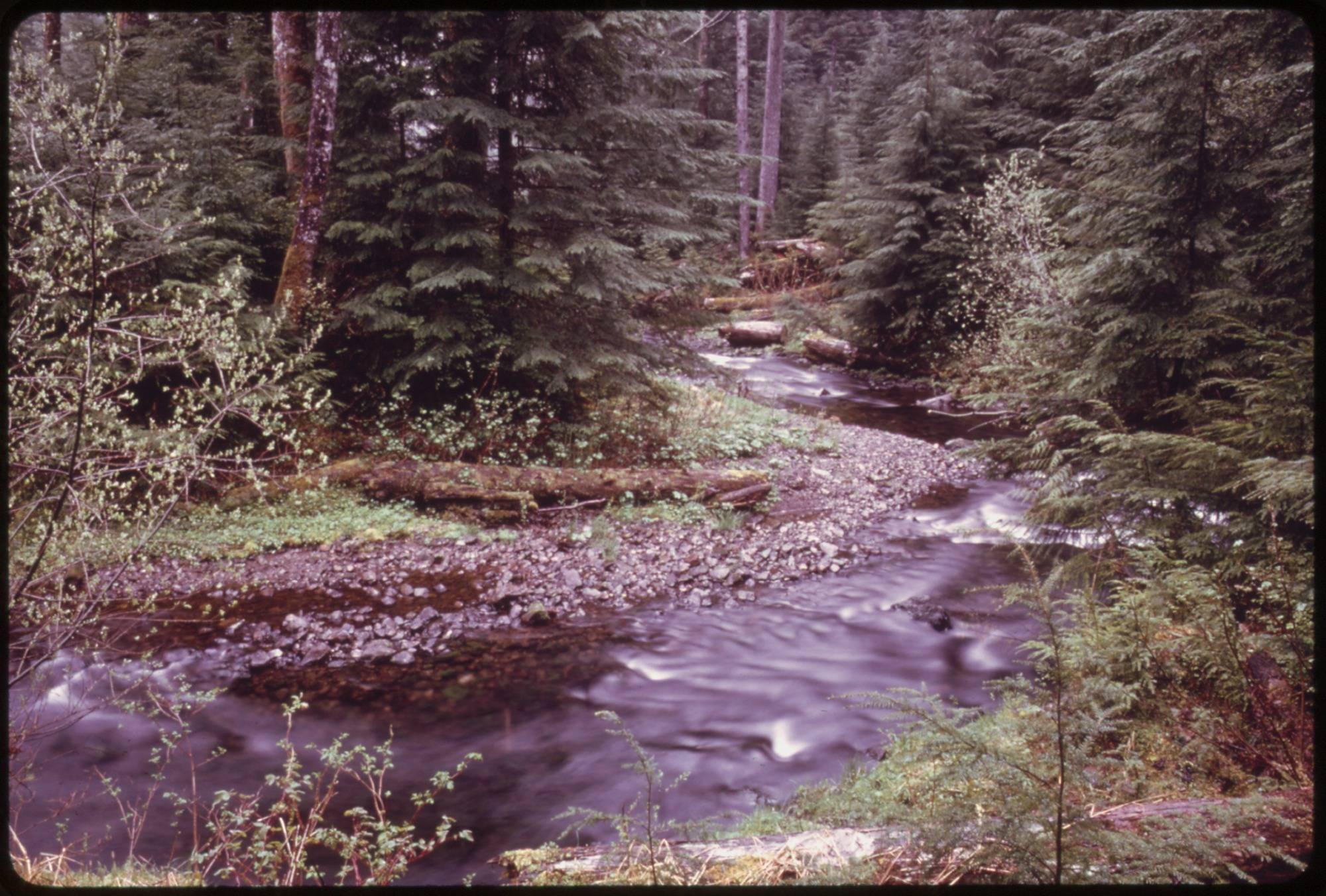

- Location of the mouth of the Satsop River in Washington

Location
- Country: United States
- State: Washington
- County: Grays Harbor

Physical characteristics
- Source: Confluence of East and West Forks
  - coordinates: 47°2′11″N 123°31′38″W
- Mouth: Chehalis River
  - coordinates: 46°58′44″N 123°28′53″W
  - elevation: 23 ft (7.0 m)
- Length: 6.5 mi (10.5 km)
- Basin size: 291 sq mi (750 km^{2})
- Discharge
  - location: river mile 2.3 near Satsop, WA
  - average: 2,039 cu ft/s (57.7 m^{3}/s)
  - minimum: 147 cu ft/s (4.2 m^{3}/s)
  - maximum: 51,800 cu ft/s (1,470 m^{3}/s)

The Satsop River is a stream in the U.S. state of Washington. It has three main tributary forks, the East Fork, West Fork, and Middle Fork Satsop Rivers. The main stem Satsop River is formed by the confluence of the West and East Forks. The Middle Fork is a tributary of the East Fork. The three forks are much longer than the main stem Satsop itself, which flows south from the confluence only a few miles to join the Chehalis River near Satsop, Washington. Other significant tributaries include the Canyon River and Little River, both tributaries of the West Fork Satsop, and Decker Creek, a tributary of the East Fork Satsop River. The Satsop River's major tributaries originate in the Olympic Mountains and its southern foothills, the Satsop Hills, within Grays Harbor and Mason counties. Most of the Satsop River's watershed consists of heavily wooded hill lands. The upper tributaries extend into Olympic National Forest, approaching but not quite reaching Olympic National Park.

The Satsop River watershed is located east of the Wynoochee River and south of the Skokomish River watersheds.

== Course ==
The main stem Satsop River originates at the confluence of the East and West Forks and flows generally south to Satsop, where it empties into Chehalis River at Chehalis river mile 20.2. U.S. Route 12 crosses the river near its mouth. The main stem river flows through a broad valley used for farming.

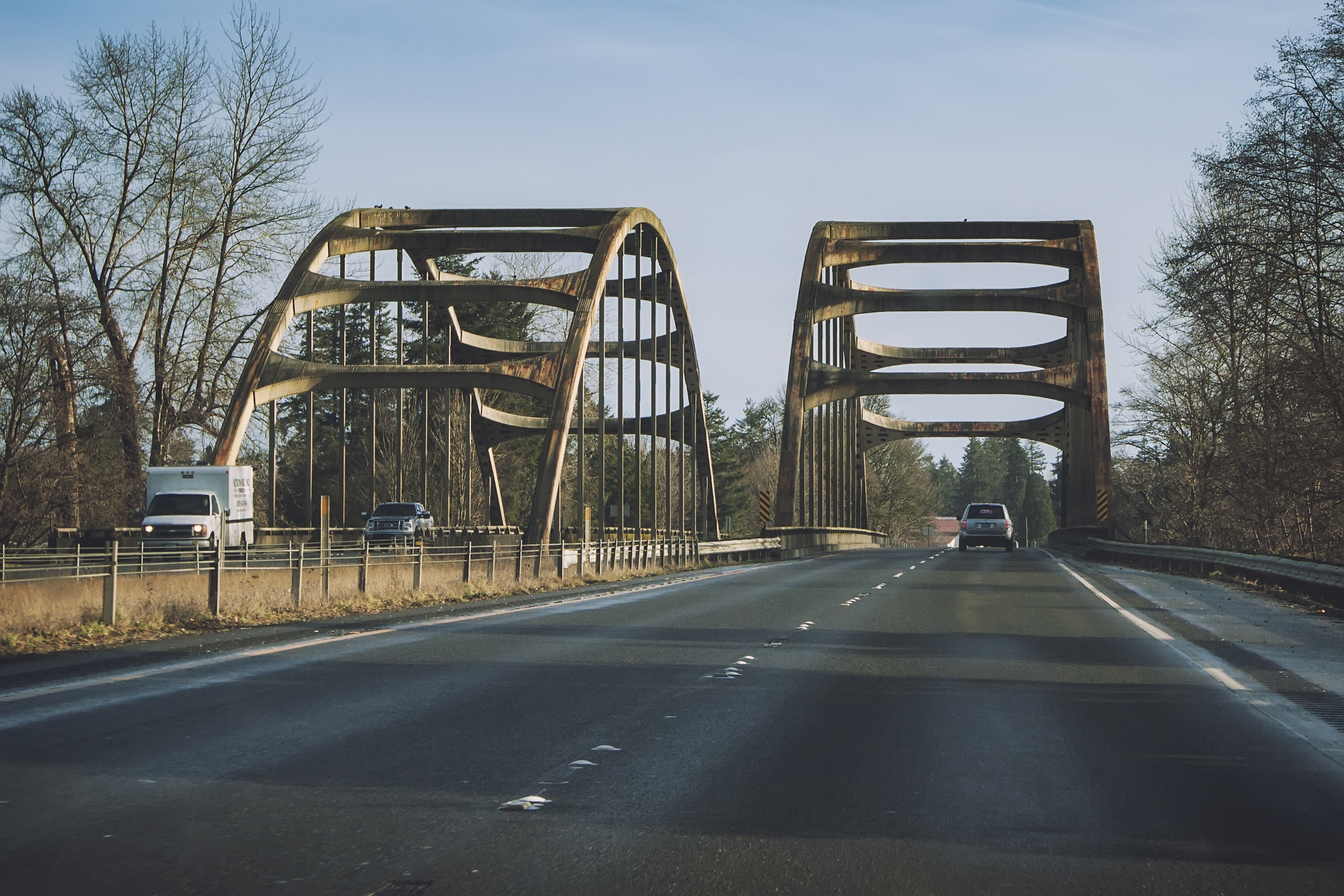
U.S. Route 12 bridges over the Satsop River

The river has several significant tributaries, including the West, East, and Middle Forks. These forks are significant rivers in their own right and unite only a few miles north of the Chehalis River. The forks are all much longer than the main stem Satsop River.

The West Fork Satsop River rises in the southern Olympic Mountains. It flows south through a narrow gorge. In its final miles the river valley broadens. At 44 miles (71 km) long, the West Fork is the longest tributary. The total river length from the West Fork's source to the mouth of the main stem Satsop River is approximately 50.5 miles (81.3 km). The length from the source of the Canyon River is nearly as long, at 48.5 miles (78.1 km). Its watershed is 154 square miles (400 km^{2}) large. Much of the watershed is privately owned timber lands. The West Fork has two major tributaries, the 20-mile (32 km) long Canyon River and the 6-mile (9.7 km) long Little River. The Canyon River, West Fork, and Middle Fork all originate close to one another in the Olympic Mountains. The Canyon River's source is approximately 1.6 miles (2.6 km) east of the source of the West Fork and 1.4 miles (2.3 km) west of the source of the Middle Fork. These rivers originate in the southern Olympic Mountains in the general vicinity of Chapel Peak, Dusk Point, and Anderson Butte.

The East Fork Satsop River originates at the confluence of Phillips Creek and Stillwater Creek. It flows generally southwest through a broad and flat valley. Bingham Creek is its main tributary, joining from the north. Below Bingham Creek the East Fork flows through Carstairs Prairie before being joined by Decker Creek and the Middle Fork Satsop River, both from the north. The East Fork is approximately 21 miles (34 km) long. Its headwater tributary, Stillwater Creek, is 3 miles (4.8 km) long.

The Middle Fork Satsop River rises in the foothills of the Olympic Mountains and flows south, passing through steep gorges and canyons. At 35 miles (56 km) long it is the second longest tributary. Shortly below the Middle Fork's confluence with Baker Creek its valley widens as the river approaches its confluence with the East Fork Satsop River. Most of the watershed of the Middle Fork is second-growth forest used for timber production.

Decker Creek flows through broad prairie lands and gently sloping valleys. It joins the East Fork Satsop River upstream from the Middle Fork confluence. Decker Creek is approximately 16 miles (26 km) long.

== Land use ==
Land ownership within the Satsop River's watershed, approximately, is 62% corporate (182 sq mi (470 km^{2})), 18% National Forest (52 sq mi (130 km^{2})), 13% private (37 sq mi (96 km^{2})), 6% state (19 sq mi (49 km^{2})), and less than 1% municipal and county (0.9 sq mi (2.3 km^{2})).

Commercial forests, including National Forest lands, make up about 95% of the land use in the Satsop watershed. Cropland and pasture account for about 3%. Built-up areas, rural non-farms, and barren lands account for slightly over 1%.

== History ==
The Satsop River's name comes from Upper Chehalis /sácapš/, literally "made stream", from /sáʔa–/, "make, do", plus /cápš/, "stream". The Satsop Native Americans, who lived along the river, were neighbors of the Lower Chehalis, Humptulip, and the Hoquiam peoples, with whom they shared a similar political organization. The relation of the Satsops to other Native Americans remains unclear. Some ethnologists classify the Satsops as a subdivision of the Lower Chehalis people while others place them closer to the Upper Chehalis (Kwaiailk) people, in part because the Satsop Coast Salish dialect appears most closely related to the Upper Chehalis dialect. The Upper and Lower Chehalis dialects are distinct and the boundary between them was at the confluence of the Chehalis and Satsop Rivers. A trail ran through the Satsop lands over which trade passed south to Grays Harbor and Willapa Bay. The Satsops were devastated by smallpox and other epidemics, after which a remnant population moved from their ancestral lands along the Satsop River to the Chehalis Reservation. The Satsop population was listed as 350 in 1870 and only 12 in 1885. There is no Satsop tribe today.

John Rady became the first settler on the Satsop River in 1852. French Canadians and Germans began to settle in the Satsop Valley in the 1860s and 1870s. The Schafer family was among the early settlers, having moved to the region from Wisconsin. Three of the Schafer brothers, sons of the pioneering family, founded one of the biggest and most successful logging companies of the area. From a start using an oxteam to haul logs the Schafer's company grew to own large tracts of timberland served by miles of logging railroads.

Under the Chehalis Basin Strategy, the Satsop River received $3.0 million in funding beginning in 2023 to improve approximately 5 miles (8.0 km) of the waterway near Satsop and the Chehalis River conjunction. The plans include the elimination of excess erosion, some due to previous control attempts, as well the reintroduction of riparian habitats. Over 30 logjam jacks are to be installed along with 350 acres (140 ha) of ecosystem improvements. The project, planned to be completed in 2028, is meant to also increase the biome for salmon and other aquatic species while helping mitigate flood concerns in the area.

== Natural history ==
The Satsop River is one of the larger tributaries of the Chehalis River, especially in the summer. In August, approximately 30% of the Chehalis River's flow at Cosmopolis comes from the Satsop River.

The Satsop and its tributaries support a variety of migratory fish, including chinook, chum, and coho salmon. The Middle Fork Satsop River in particular supports very large runs of all three species. The West Fork Satsop also supports sizable runs of all three species. Other tributaries important for salmon spawning include Decker Creek, Canyon River, and the Little River.

A number of projects have been undertaken to improve salmon habitat in the Satsop watershed, including the construction of spawning channels and fish hatcheries.

== Forestry ==
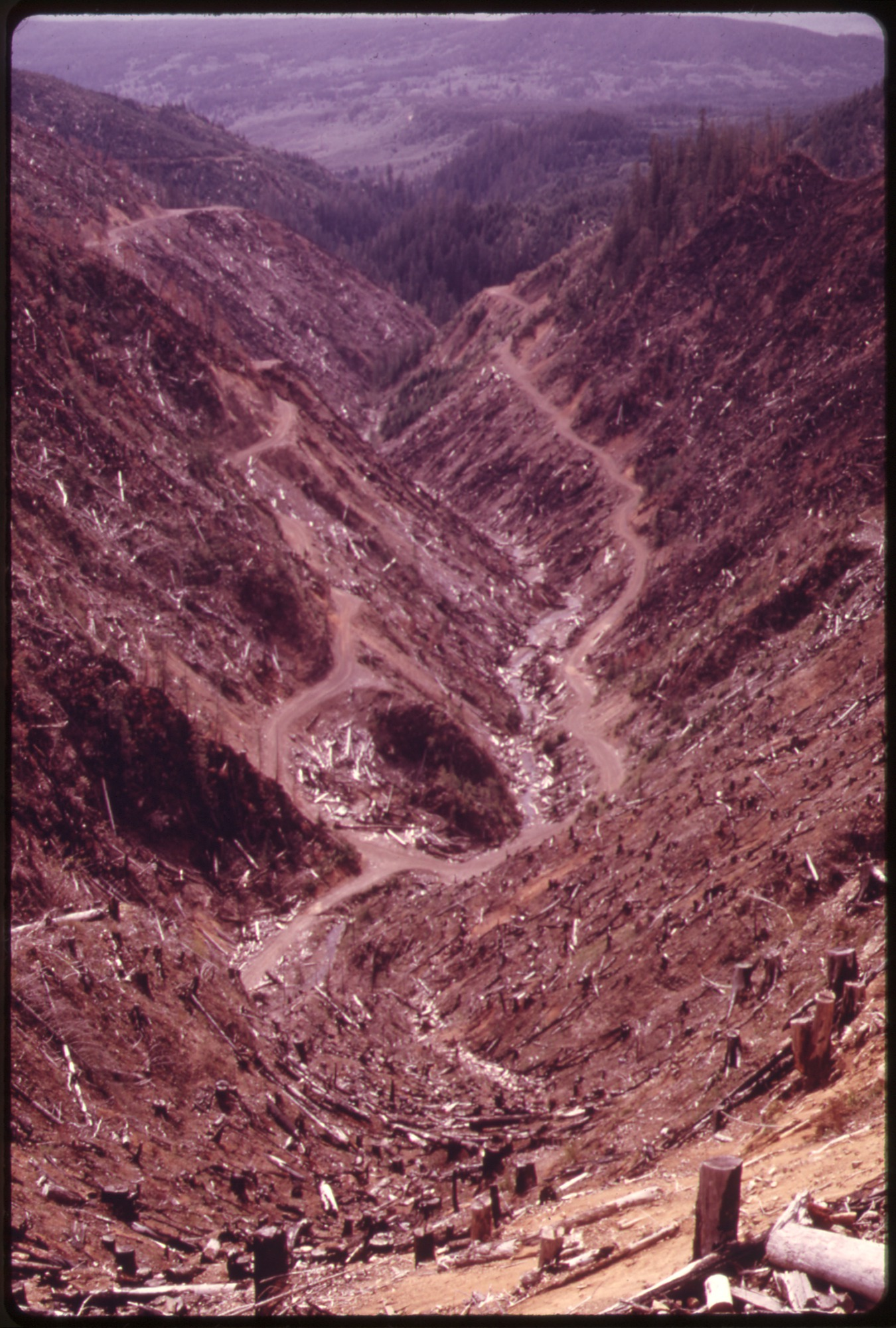
Clearcutting in the Satsop River drainage system, 1973

The Satsop River's watershed is prime timber land and much of it is privately owned and regularly harvested. Approximately 70% of the watershed's forests are less than 35 years old. The timber harvesting combined with the region's steep slopes presents erosion and mass wasting hazards. In addition there is a relatively high density of roads, mostly for logging, which increases the erosion and sedimentation risks. Rainfall in the region ranges from 70 to 175 inches per year, which further increases the danger of destructive erosion.

== See also ==
- List of rivers of Washington (state)
