= Chehalis River Basin Flood Authority =

Watershed authority in Washington, United States

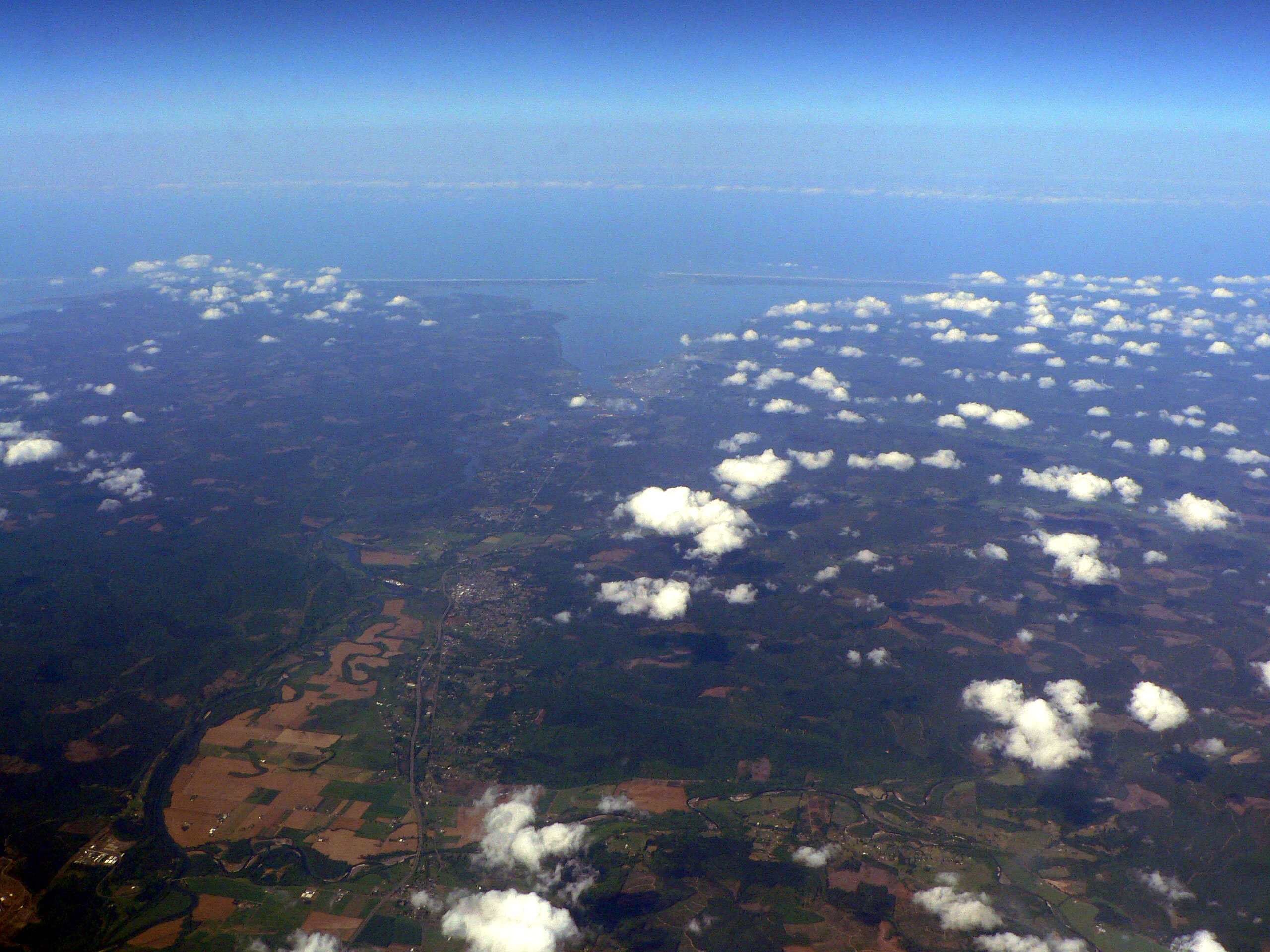
- Chehalis River in Grays Harbor, 2006

Agency overview
- Formed: 2008
- Headquarters: Chehalis, Washington
- Annual budget: $75 million (2025-2027)
- Agency executives: Edna Fund, Chair; Brian Shay, Vice chair
- Website: Chehalis River Basin Flood Authority

Footnotes
- Agency executives

The Chehalis River Basin Flood Authority is a state government program that oversees the watershed of the Chehalis River in Washington state. The commission focuses on flood control and river health, as well as habitat restoration, with particular attention to native plants, fish, and other aquatic species. It partners with various non-profits, local organizations, Native American communities and tribes, and other state and federal government agencies, often through its program, the Chehalis Basin Strategy.

The strategy, begun in 2016, has focused on habitat restorations, specifically on aquatic ecosystems and native vegetation. Over one hundred projects have been funded through the authority and strategy that include the removal of man-made obstacles that prevented fish migration, provided plantings of trees and shrubbery around creeks and tributaries that help increase biomass while lowering water temperatures, and purchasing of land near watersheds for permanent protection.

With a wide agreement on protecting local ecosystems, especially salmon habitat, migration routes, and spawning areas, competing proposals of various support and opposition have been introduced in the 21st century to solve the ongoing mission to mitigate flooding in the Chehalis River basin. A main component of the authority's flood control initiative is the creation of a dam in Pe Ell, Washington that focuses on protection and improvements of local habitats. Competing proposals, offered by tribal communities and citizen groups in the region, rely on natural corrections to the floodplain, including heavy biome restoration in the basin as well as the prevention of future construction in the watershed.

== Chehalis River ==
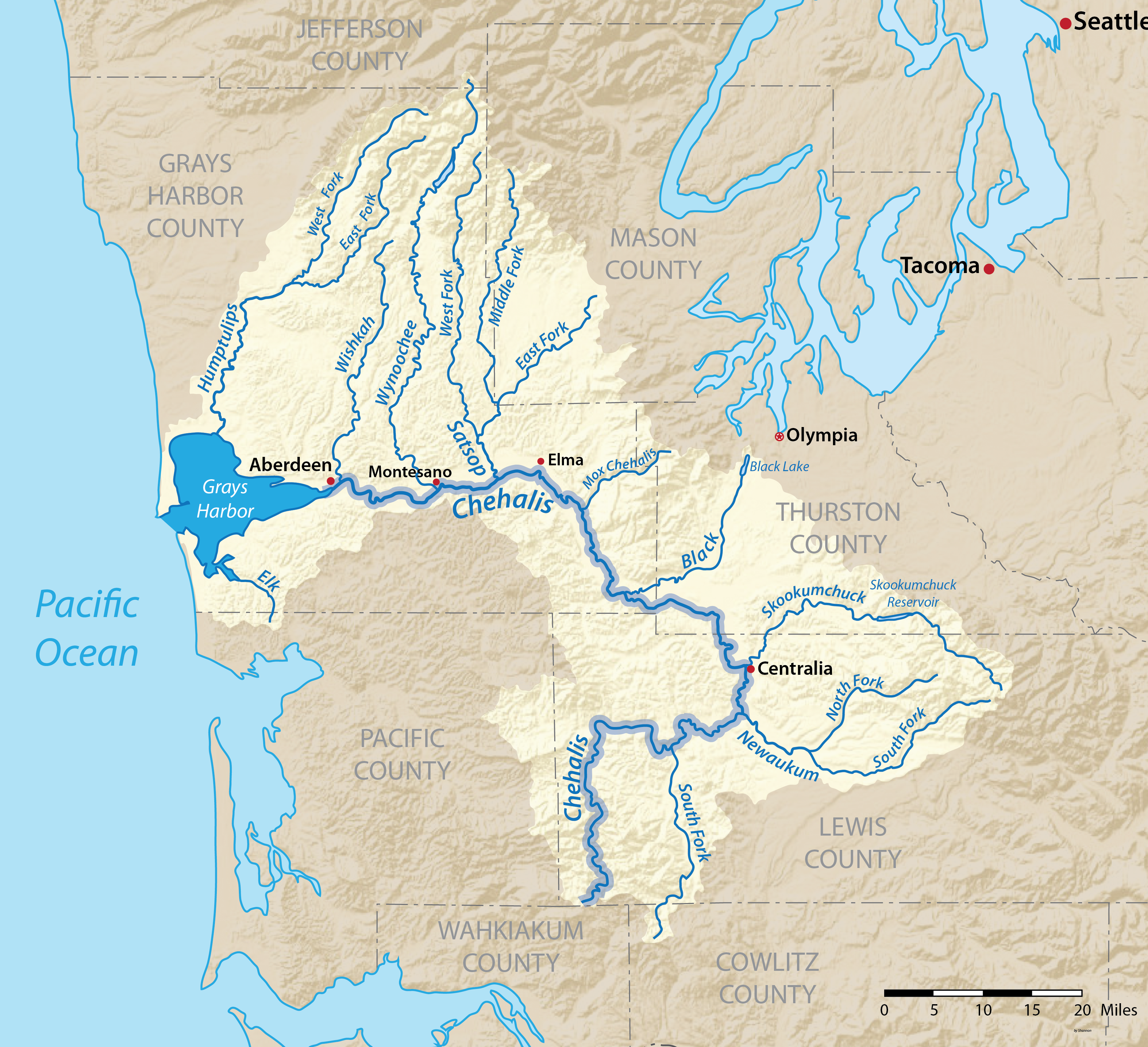
Map of the Chehalis River watershed

The Chehalis River Basin encompasses over 3,400 square miles (8,800 km^{2}) of creeks, rivers, and streams, and is a biome for indigenous amphibian and aquatic species, especially salmon, as well as mammals and birds, some of which are listed as endangered. The watershed is recognized as the second-largest river basin in the state, and is the largest river system within the borders.

=== Flood history ===
Based on historical accounts from the Chehalis people and early non-Native settlers, seasonal flooding in the basin was considered to be normal and cyclical. Indigenous tribes did not build or maintain permanent structures in the floodplains and the first settlements in the 1800s were constructed on higher elevations. With the introduction of railroads in the 1870s, and a subsequent increase in timber harvesting due to the new rail systems, denuded forest land around the Chehalis River led flood waters to be mostly contained in deeper valleys and channels. Though some floods continued to occur, they were sparse enough that flood control measures were considered too costly and unnecessary. Development in the floodplain began in the early 1900s, and by the late 20th century, floods became more severe and more numerous.

=== Aquatic habitats ===
The Chehalis River, with lower water flow and drier, warmer weather patterns, has experienced loss to fish runs and migration, including a loss of up to 87% in fish habitat, since the late 20th century. Native American communities have reported reduced catches during fishing. Salmon populations are recorded to be half of their historic numbers, with the census of Spring chinook approximately 23% of their average. Other endangered or crucial endemic species in the basin of particular interest under several programs and projects include the Oregon spotted frog and the coastal tailed frog.

== Flood control ==
By 2008, studies of flood control in the Chehalis Basin had cost $12 million and most reports or attempts were denied due to cost–benefit analysis that determined the funding of projects would not be offset by the savings that flood control measures would provide. After the January 2009 flood, additional reports were commissioned in 2011 and in the following year the governor, Christine Gregoire helped to form the Chehalis Basin Work Group to study and recommend flood control measures as well as the restoration of aquatic ecosystems.

The river system within Lewis County by the turn of the 21st century had gauges operated by the United States Geological Survey (USGS). Specifically used to track the depth of the waters, it was run in conjunction with the county. In 2010, the flood authority implemented the installation of an online flood warning system available to residents in the Chehalis basin. Known as the Chehalis Basin Flood Warning System, it expanded a sensor network already in place, providing information on rainfall and temperature, as well as additional gauges. Alert warnings are sent via email and provide information on 13 rivers in the area. The system won the 2023 National Hydrologic Warning Council (NHWC) Operational Excellence Award.

== Chehalis River Basin Flood Authority ==
The Chehalis River Basin Flood Authority (CRBFA) was established in 2008 and manages flood control and concerns for the Chehalis River and its watershed. The program was initiated after the December 2007 floods which caused the loss of 1,300 homes in the region, the shutdown of Interstate 5, and total damages of over $900 million.

The CRBFA is overseen and funded by the Washington State Department of Ecology Office of Chehalis Basin (OCB). The OCB, which began after legislative action in 2016, formally represents the Chehalis people and the Quinault tribes, as well as communities and counties that lie within the Chehalis watershed. Grays Harbor County is a member of the authority as are the communities of Aberdeen, Cosmopolis, Hoquiam, Montesano and Oakville. (Note: Grays Harbor County, along with Aberdeen and Montesano, officially joined the authority in April 2008.) The cities of Centralia, Chehalis, and Napavine, as well as the town of Pe Ell, are joined with Lewis County as members. Thurston County and the town of Bucoda represent the northern reaches of the CRBFA.

The OCB, a direct descendant of the Chehalis Basin Work Group, was formally created in 2017. As of 2017, the board has seven members, two of whom are appointed by the Confederated Tribes of the Chehalis and the Quinault Indian Nation.

A comprehensive study, known as the Programmatic Environmental Impact Statement, was released by the Department of Ecology in September 2016 and detailed four options, titled "Alternatives", on flood control and the creation, protection, and restoration of aquatic habitats in the Chehalis River basin. Though the report agreed with long-standing ideas and proposals of local flood mitigation and ecosystem protections, the introduced options were also based on financial and timelines costs, as well as funding and community willingness. The alternatives included a dam and reservoir in Pe Ell, levee and dike builds, the purchase of land to create "non-structural flood protection", or allowing the upper basin and floodplain to return to a more natural state, allowing natural processes to prevent future flood issues. The most expensive options could cost as much as $1.8 billion, despite the report noting that a failure to reduce flooding in the basin over a 100-year span could potentially lead to $3.5 billion in losses.

In late 2024, the OCB requested an $80 million budget appropriation from the state legislature that is to fund the authority and basin strategy until 2027, helping to "aggressively pursue" various continuing projects, including the advancement to build a pass-through dam. As of 2025, the OCB, authority, basin strategy, and connected participants have completed 140 ecosystem restorations, which includes over 300 acres (120 ha) of preservation, and provided flood protection for more than 200 residences and commercial buildings. The estimated costs during this period are listed at $152 million.

== Chehalis Basin Strategy ==
The Chehalis Basin Strategy began in 2014 and is an organized partnership of county governments within the Chehalis River basin, various other regional governments, and the Washington Department of Fish and Wildlife (WDFW). The partnership also includes associations with Native American tribes, environmental groups, scientists, and local citizens. The purpose of the CBS is to propose and research a combination of plans along the Chehalis River to mitigate flooding and to restore aquatic habitat, particularly for local Chinook salmon. The CBS is under the administration of the Office of Chehalis Basin (OCB).

=== Aquatic Species Restoration Program ===
Several undertakings are part of the Aquatic Species Restoration Program (ASRP), a main sub-program of the CBS and a focus under the WDFW that began in 2019. The project is more expansive in scope, focusing on restoring larger portions and sections of the basin, using natural remedies that increase and protect native habitats while providing long-term stability, such as against climate change, in the ecosystem. An official, ten-year plan was released in 2021. As of 2025, the ASRP has funded projects with partners in the amount of $28 million which has helped restore 300 acres (120 ha) and 12 miles (19 km) of floodplain and waterway habitats, respectively. Efforts have also led to an additional 100 miles (160 km) of the Chehalis River watershed to be reopened to native fish species.

=== Proposals ===
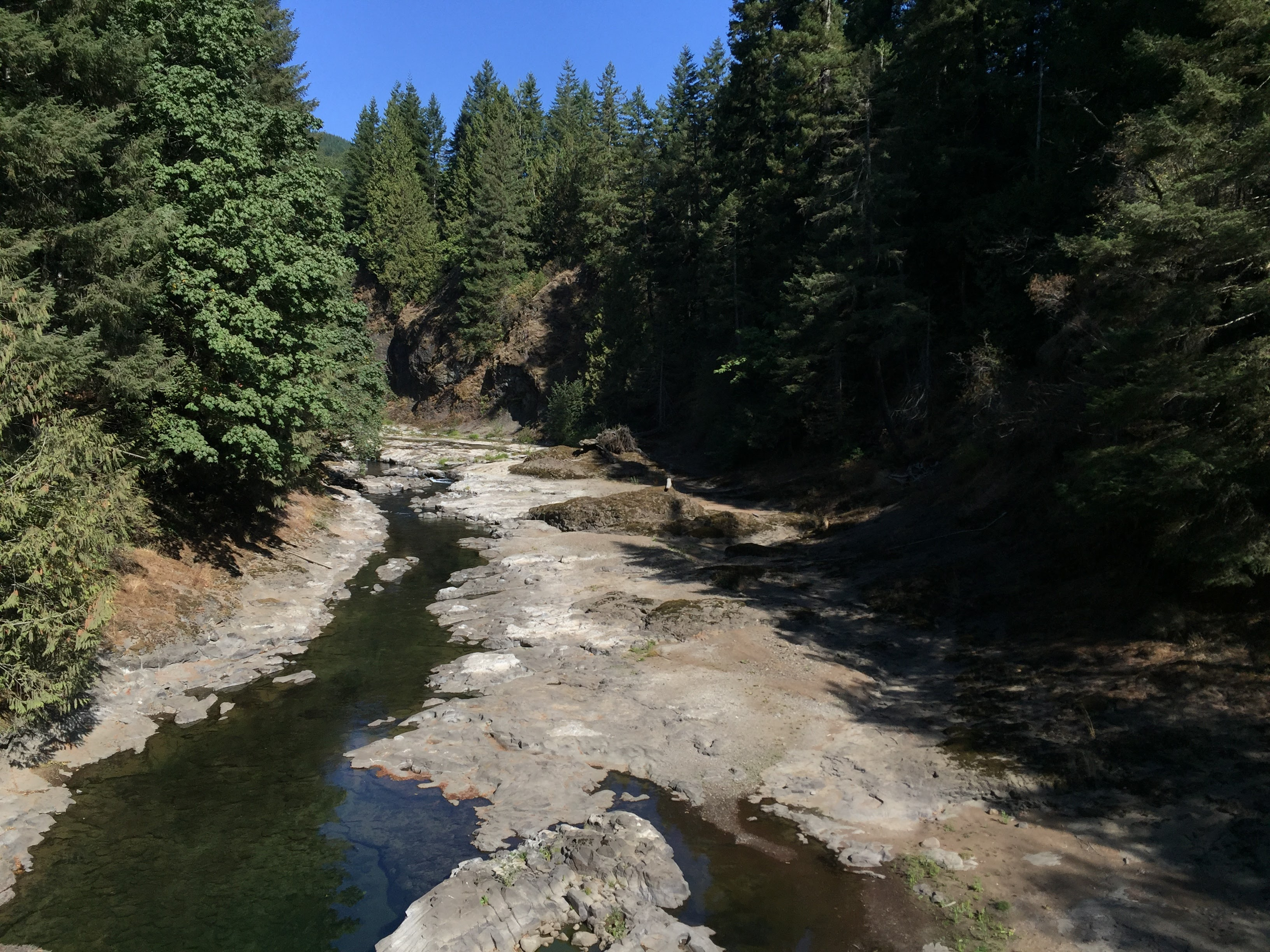
Upper Chehalis River near Pe Ell, 2017

The initial proposal outlined several flood control reduction measures, with downstream levee improvements particularly at the Chehalis–Centralia Airport, and a flood retention dam in Pe Ell which is planned to limit catastrophic damage from 100-year floods within the Chehalis River Basin. Additional recommendations include a flood wall between Centralia and Chehalis to protect the interstate, purchasing property from current owners in the floodplains, and various forms of flood protections to existing buildings.

Proposals regarding aquatic habitats encompass the construction of fish passages, replacing culverts and removing other fish migration barriers, biome protection via land acquisitions, replanting of native flora, and removing human-made obstacles to reconnect the basin system to its natural state. Projects began under a three-phase effort.

=== First phase ===
The first phases of the strategy began in 2012 and declared achieved in the early 2020s with a combined 140 flood and habitat projects completed at a cost of $152 million. One of the first projects included the construction of evacuation routes and farm pads (a type of fenced, dirt pen) on farmlands that were susceptible to floods. Due to flooding from the Great Coastal Gale of 2007, design plans began in 2011 to help mitigate future farm losses, especially for livestock. A combined 23 pads were built in Lewis and Gray counties by 2017 at a cost of $866,000 and no loss of farm animals or farm equipment were recorded after a large January 2022 flood event.

As part of early funding in the mid-2010s of $50 million, Grant, Lewis, and Thurston counties received disbursements of $6.0 million to begin work on fish passages, including eight culvert removals that opened over 60 miles (97 km) of waterways in Lewis County. In 2016, Grays Harbor County and several communities in its borders received approximately $3.9 million from the state to fund the removal of barriers in the Johns River basin, design and permit efforts for future projects, and several fish barrier improvements on various streams and creeks.

Projects in the early phases that focused on specific cities, towns, and communities include a new pump house in Hoquiam that replaced an ineffective, aging pump that was to be used to as a starting point for future levee builds. Log jacks were installed in Montesano that helped increase the riverbank of the migrating Wynoochee River, which was threatening the local wastewater plant that, during flooding, would have inundated the community with sewage runoff. The fortification also increased the habitat of aquatic species and extended the operating life of the plant by several decades. A new dam was constructed on Mill Creek in Cosmopolis and provides additional flood protection for over 200 homes in the area; the structure included fish ladders, which helped immediately restore the migration of local fish species. An aging and failing pump installed during World War II at the Chehalis–Centralia Airport was replaced in 2018 with a redundant dual-pump electric system, protecting the airfield and the local shopping district.

Improving or repairing aquatic ecosystems has been widespread in the basin and has included projects focused on interconnecting creeks, streams, and rivers. Efforts include the Stillman Creek Restoration Project near Boistfort, focusing on erosion control, habitat restoration, and to restore the floodplain and course of the waters.

Efforts under the Aquatic Species Restoration Plan (ASRP) include fish passage restoration of the Middle Fork Wildcat Creek, a Cloquallum Creek tributary in McCleary, and a silvopasture effort on the Skookumchuck River. Additional ASRP restoration projects include fish passages in Elma and Oakville, and habitat improvements to creeks and their watersheds within Lewis County and the city of Chehalis.

=== Second and third stages ===
The second stage of the program was implemented soon thereafter and is focused on long-term solutions and strategy for flood control and financial backing of future tasks. The final phase is planned to begin in the mid-2020s and will target construction, additional financing, and devising long-term structural government oversight. The 2021 state legislature authorized $70 million in funding for a variety of additional strategy projects.

In 2012, several projects began in Grays Harbor County which consisted mostly of upgrades or construction of floodwalls, levees, and pump houses, to protect flood-prone communities in the region. The county struggles with high waters after excessive rainfall due to flat topography, the drainage of the Chehalis River watershed into the Pacific Ocean, tidal surges, and coastal flooding. As of 2024, the project is ongoing, estimated to cost $50 million while protecting residential areas, commercial buildings, and infrastructure within the county valued at over $1.0 billion.

During the early 2020s, continuing projects similar to the first stage of the strategy continued. The authority granted the city of Centralia approximately $2.3 million towards ongoing work to restore fish habitat and improve flood control at China Creek. Due to urban construction, the creek had become a headwater for floods that affected the downtown core and surrounding residential areas. The Satsop River received $3.0 million in funding beginning in 2023 to improve approximately 5 miles (8.0 km) of the waterway near Satsop and the Chehalis River conjunction. Plans included the elimination of excess erosion with logjam jacks, the reintroduction of 350 acres (140 ha) of riparian habitats, improving the ecosystem for salmon and other aquatic species, and helping mitigate flood concerns in the area.

=== Long-term projects ===
Part of the basin strategy is to remove artificial barriers and to restore forests and woodlands near the Chehalis River and its tributaries, to promote the habitats of aquatic species such as salmon, steelhead, and trout. As of 2023, the project, led by the ASRP, has worked with an ongoing WDFW program begun in 2005 that has removed or reengineered 81 man-made impediments in the Chehalis basin.

== Proposed dams ==
=== Skookumchuck Dam ===
A major tributary of the Chehalis River is the Skookumchuck River which flows east-to-west from north central Lewis County to its confluence at Centralia. Behind a 190 foot (58 metres) tall embankment, known as the Skookumchuck Dam, is a 4-mile (6.4 km) long reservoir that, when water levels are low, provide some downstream flood prevention but the dam system was not built with the intent to provide flood control. Several attempts at engineering the existing dam and storage basin for flood mitigation were undertaken. A conversion of the dam as a major flood control system in the Chehalis-Centralia area and downstream communities on the Chehalis River was seen as unlikely due to exorbitant costs, construction time, and a low cost-to-benefit ratio.

=== Pel Ell Dam ===
In opposition to the continual use of levees as a means to control flooding, a group of citizens, known as One Voice, formed a proposal for the use of two dams in the basin after the floods produced from the Great Coastal Gale of 2007. One was to be located near Boistfort, Washington and the other in Pe Ell. Though the Boistfort dam did not materialize, the CBS and One Voice has continued to propose the Pe Ell dam that would temporarily be used as a reservoir to withhold excess runoff during heavy rainfall or snowmelt situations.

==== Details and function ====
As of 2020, the structure was planned to be 270 feet (82.3 m) in height and was to be built in a canyon located in forest lands used for commercial timber harvest. The project, if constructed, was estimated to lower 100-year flood waters in the Twin Cities by over 1.5 feet (0.5 m) as well as protect 25% of buildings that were at-risk during a major flood event. An OCB group, known as the Local Action Non-Dam (LAND), was organized to focus on options outside of the dam proposal.

The waters would be released after the threat of a flood has eased, or the river basin has been determined to withstand additional flow. The plans include the construction of fish passages. During a retention period, fish trapped in the reservoir would be caught and transported to the other side of the dam. Studies of the build of the dam has been determined it to be of positive economic value to the region as major flooding events would be significantly reduced while protecting infrastructure and various populated areas.

In a revised draft of a Washington State Department of Ecology environmental impact statement, released in November 2025, the proposed dam was reported to be able to hold up to 62,000 acre feet of water. The pass-through structure was also noted to be able to prevent the flooding of over 3,500 acres (1,400 ha) during a major flood and up to almost 3,800 acres (1,500 ha) acres during a catastrophic event.

==== Negative effects and opposition ====
The flood retention project has also shown to likely produce negative returns, such as disturbances to aquatic habitat, water quality of the Chehalis River, as well as adverse affects on recreation and Native American lands and culture. Based on a 2017 environmental impact statement, when the dam's reservoir is full, the waters would cover 847 acres (343 ha) and extend 6.2 miles (10.0 km). Additional concerns were broached, focusing on habitat concerns, such as the necessary removal of 90 percent of trees in the holding area and issues of salmon survival due to potential increases in water temperatures, the loss of spawning areas, dissolved oxygen, and eventual degradation of the food chain. Cost estimates, which include construction and mitigation projects, were projected at over $600 million. The dam would also create a loss of use for recreation, such as kayaking and fishing. The dam is predicted to provide little downstream benefit to communities in Grays Harbor County and only moderate reduction of flood waters to the lands of the Confederated Tribes of the Chehalis Reservation.

Though the dam proposal has been endorsed by the Chehalis River Basin Flood Authority, it has been rejected by several groups. The Quinault Indian Nation expressed concerns over the loss of fish ecosystems, specifically spring and fall Chinook salmon, a cultural staple of the indigenous people. The nation has proposed alternatives for a water retention system, with a focus on repairing habitats for native species of fish. With approximately 75% of tribal lands in the basin considered floodplain, the Chehalis and Quinault communities created a flood plan in 2009 that avoids structural and engineered systems to control flooding, rather using natural elements and ecosystems that would focus on "river movement, flooding and erosion, rather than confining the river or changing its flows." An addendum to the plan was released in 2020, adding in a concentration on the buying-out of private and commercial properties in the floodplains.

==== Environmental studies and delays ====
Efforts on the study and implementation of the dam were paused by order of the governor, Jay Inslee, in July 2020. With growing concerns over the negative aspects the dam would have to the natural ecosystem, the authority, strategy, and connected partners and government entities were required to find alternatives to the dam, specifically non-structural, natural remedies that would protect the watershed's aquatic habitats. The directive allowed the groups time to propose such alternatives in time for the 2021 state legislature session, and asked that communication and participation with tribal communities be improved.

During the same year, the United States Army Corps of Engineers (USACE) completed their own environmental impact statement. Known as the Chehalis River Basin Flood Damage Reduction Project EIS, (Note: A public meeting to be held in December 2025 by the Washington state Department of Ecology to discuss the Chehalis River Basin Flood Damage Reduction Project EIS was abruptly cancelled due to concerns over the possible severity of the 2025 Pacific Northwest floods.) it proposed over 60 alternatives to flood control methods in the basin and it included impact studies of a dam build. Plans of a redesigned, non-traditional dam were released in August 2024 which included a new location in Pe Ell to minimize effects on indigenous lands. The reservoir was reduced by 32 acres (13 ha) and the pass-through structure designed to simulate the river bed and flow of the waterway. The revised dam incorporated several design changes due to a variety of concerns from prior studies and protests, such as protection of aquatic and vegetative habitats, recreation access to the river, and potential disruption to Pe Ell's water supply..

By 2025, the OCB listed six flood control options under study. A final determination is planned for 2026. The six options continue the existing efforts of the authority and Chehalis Basin Strategy, including connected programs. Long-term efforts, such as aquatic and erosion protections, flood control, and warning systems, remain a part of each of the six proposals. The plans vary in the use of three major options, the Pe Ell and Skookumchuck dams and additional levees.

== Connected projects ==
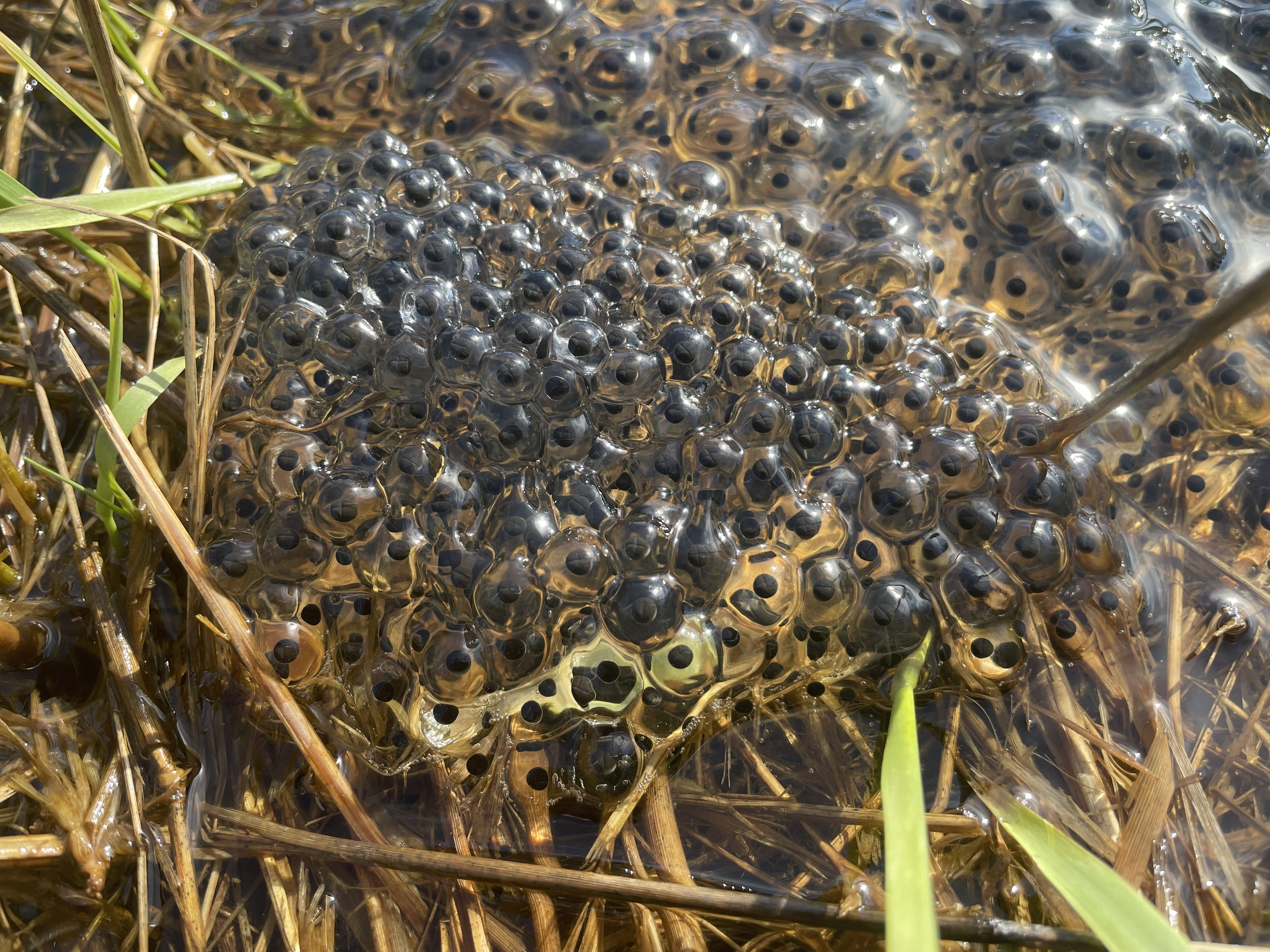
Oregon spotted frog egg mass, Chehalis River Basin, 2025

After the discovery of the Oregon spotted frog in the watershed of the Black River in Thurston County, Washington, a species thought to be extinct in the area, a cooperation between the non-profit Capitol Land Trust and a landowner purchased 60 acres (24 ha) around the Blooms Ditch tributary in order to establish a habitat for the amphibian. Along with an additional acquisition of 60 acres (24 ha) and over 4,000 feet (1,219.2 m) of the ditch, the project created the Blooms Preserve. Fourteen Chehalis Basin Strategy partners combined to control invasive plants, the construction of ponds to hold water throughout the year, and the planting of native vegetation, while continuing to improve the riparian habitat to provide a healthier habitat for fish and other aquatic animals.

The authority and strategy boards work with the Chehalis Lead Entity through the Chehalis Basin Salmon Restoration and Preservation Strategy, a habitat restoration program specific to salmon recovery and the preservation of salmon environments. The entity, which began in 2004 by authorization of the state legislature,, was renamed by 2025 as the Chehalis Basin Collaborative for Salmon Habitat. The program is a collective of Grays Harbor, Lewis, and Thurston counties and includes collaboration with fisheries in the basin as well as the Confederated Tribes of the Chehalis Reservation.

Another partner with the authority and strategy is the Chehalis Basin Land Trust which, as of 2021, protects approximately 40,500 acres (16,400 ha) in the Chehalis River basin.
