= Satsop Hills =

Foothills in Washington, United States

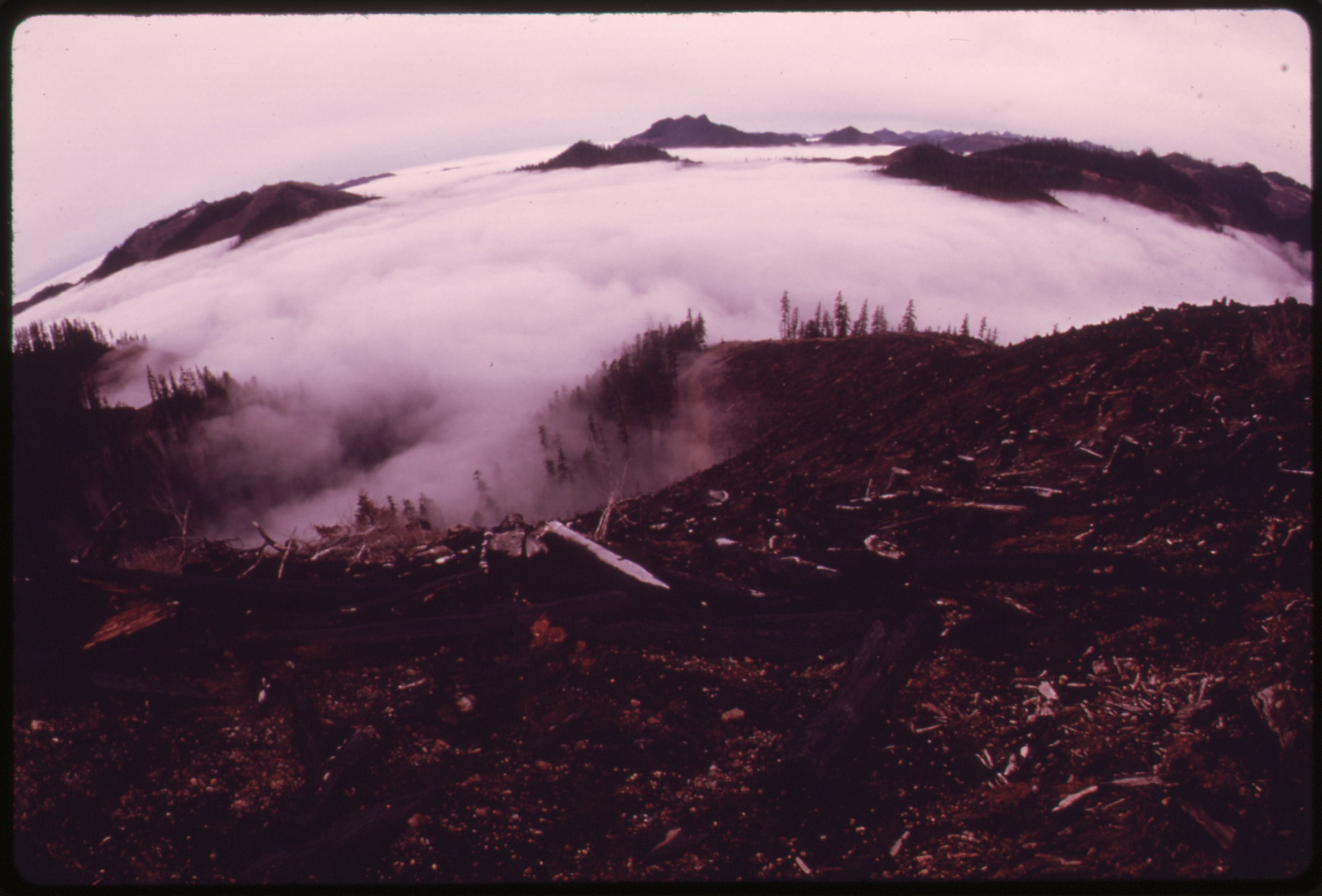
- Logged hill, foreground, and peaks rising above fog in Satsop Hills

Highest point
- Peak: Rock Peak
- Elevation: 3,294 ft (1,004 m)
- Coordinates: 47°24′17″N 123°22′54″W

Geography
- Location within Washington (state)
- Country: United States
- State: Washington
- Region: Western Washington
- Range coordinates: 47°22′N 123°27′W
- Parent range: Olympic Mountains

The Satsop Hills are foothills of the Olympic Mountains in Mason County, Washington north of Matlock, Washington, between Wynoochee Lake to the west and Lake Cushman to the east.

== Geography ==
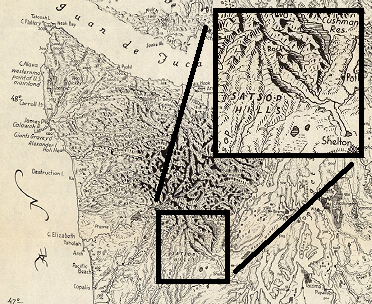
Inset map showing Satsop Hills in context of the Olympic Peninsula. Map by Erwin Raisz in 1941, predating creation of Wynoochee Dam and lake.

The Satsop River, with a 300-square-mile (780 km^{2}) watershed, rises in the hills and flows south to the Chehalis River. Where the river rises, 160 inches (4,100 mm) of annual precipitation qualifies as a temperate rainforest, a term used applied to the Satsop watershed by some publications. The Wynoochee Oxbow meteorological station on the west end of the hills (47°17′57″N 123°39′07″W) has both the highest average annual rainfall and the second highest ever recorded in the continental United States. The hills lie partly in the Olympic National Forest but not quite in the Olympic National Park. In a 1916 geological survey, hills in the vicinity of Matlock were included with the Black Hills of Thurston County, but may have been describing formations on the East Fork of the Satsop, to the south of the area described above. (Note: "The north limits [of the Black Hills] would then extend as far as Hoodsport on Hood Canal. The western limits would extend from Hoodsport southwesterly to Matlock and thence to McCleary ... [I]n the vicinity of Matlock they form a low divide between the Puget Sound basin and Grays Harbor. From Matlock the elevation of this divide gradually increases and soon merges into a high rugged spur of the Olympic Mountains...")

=== Peaks ===
Peaks in the Satsop Hills include:

Name	Height	Location	Fire lookout?
Dusk Point	3201 feet	47.411°N 123.469°W	Yes
Grisdale Hill	1446 feet	47.373°N 123.299°W	1940s
Rock Peak	3294 feet	47°24′17″N 123°22′54″W	
South Mountain	2903 feet	47.312°N 123.371°W	1956–1976

== History ==
Forest fires have struck the hills repeatedly. The term "Satsop hills" has been used at least since 1885 when the Morning Oregonian used it to describe the location of forest fires. (Note: "Heavy fires are raging in Mason County. At Shelton's Point the loggers are fighting it. Opposite that point Willey has had to remove his camp. Men are on watch along the Satsop railroad to prevent the fire from burning the logs, of which there are several hundred thousand feet. On the Satsop hills heavy fires are running, and large numbers of elk have been driven down in consequence." (emphasis added))

In September, 1902, "catastrophic" fires burned across Southwest Washington, including a burn from Elma to Shelton on Puget Sound that destroyed one million board feet of lumber at a mill in the hills above Elma, and uncounted volumes of live trees. On September 12, the county seat, Montesano experienced darkness at noon. A one- to two-mile wide swath of timber was completely burned from Elma to Summit Lake, 13 miles west.

Several fire lookouts were built on peaks in the 20th century as listed above as part of a national effort to control fires.

=== Fugitive John Tornow ===
The hills were the hideout of John Tornow, a recluse known by several monikers, such as the "Wild Man of the Wynoochee". Tornow lived in the hills as a fugitive for 19 months between 1912 and 1913 after he was accused of murdering several people including two nephews. Several attempts to find Tornow were initiated, including the formation of posses. The "Mad Daniel Boone" was eventually found in mid-April 1913, (Note: Reports vary on the actual day of Tornow's death. New reports and accounts mention as early as April 14th, while his tombstone reads April 16. See sources listed.) and after a brief gun fight, was killed by Chehalis County sheriff's deputy, Giles Quimby. Tornow's body was displayed in Montesano and despite infamy, Quimby refused vaudeville offers to recount the manhunt.

== Transportation ==
The hills are crossed by extensive logging roads and an abandoned logging railroad formerly operated by Simpson Timber Company. The Vance Creek Bridge, 347 feet (106 m) above Vance Creek (47°20′04″N 123°19′17″W), was the highest railroad bridge in the United States and remains among the twenty highest bridges in the country.

== Wildlife ==
Deer and Roosevelt Elk herds are in the hills, as well as black bear, cougars and game birds including grouse and "the largest population of mountain quail in the state". Elk are probably migratory and move in and out of the Olympic National Park. (Note: "Elk in GMU 636 can primarily be found in the upper Wynoochee River valley, the Skokomish River valley, and near the town of Matlock, WA. Although some herds remain non-migratory, we have documented migratory movement from the upper Wynoochee to the Olympic National Parkand the North Fork Skokomish River at Lake Cushman, as well as movement up the South Fork Skokomish river valley into the Olympic National Park.")

Sasquatch are reported to live in the hills, with 22 reported sightings as of 2014, including a case discovered by a sheriff's deputy in 1982 and investigated by an Idaho State University biologist in 2004.

== Recreation ==
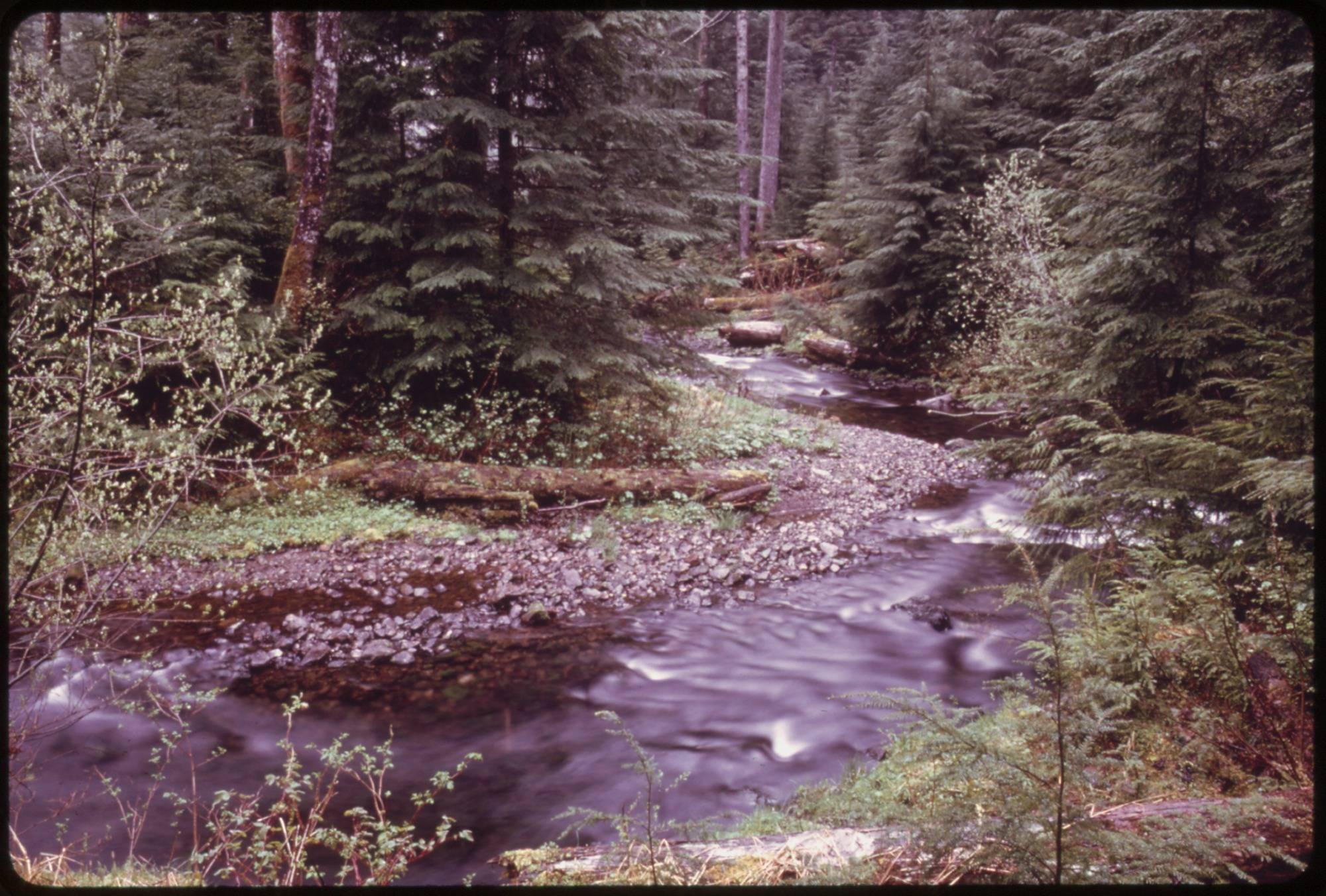
Satsop River west fork

Recreation in the hills includes canoeing and kayaking, camping, fishing, hunting and hiking. Schafer State Park, part of the Washington State Parks system, is on the Satsop River in the low hills at an altitude of 125 feet (38 m); Truman Glick County Park (35 acres (14 ha)) is along the abandoned railroad on the southern side of the hills. Hiking destinations noted in printed and online guides include Satsop Lakes (47°25′25″N 123°30′37″W), Spoon Creek Falls, South Mountain, a 3,044-foot (928 m) "moderately well known winter hiking destination" in Mason County, and Vance Creek Bridge, "made famous from millions of Instagram, Facebook, Tumblr and Twitter images" and though on closed private land, was "one of the more popular destinations on the Olympic Peninsula".

The Grays Harbor County high point is a 4,880-foot (1,490 m) peak near a slightly higher peak in Mason County unofficially named Wynoochee Point, sought by highpointing enthusiasts; it is on the Grays Harbor–Mason County line in the Satsop Hills or nearby in the adjacent Wynoochee watershed (47°29′42″N 123°30′22″W).
