= NWCS =

NWCS may refer to:

- NHS-wide Clearing Service
- North Warren Central School
- North West Cable System
- Northern Wells Community Schools
- Northwest Cannabis Solutions Satsop facility
