= Chehalis Gap =

Gap in the Coast Range, Washington

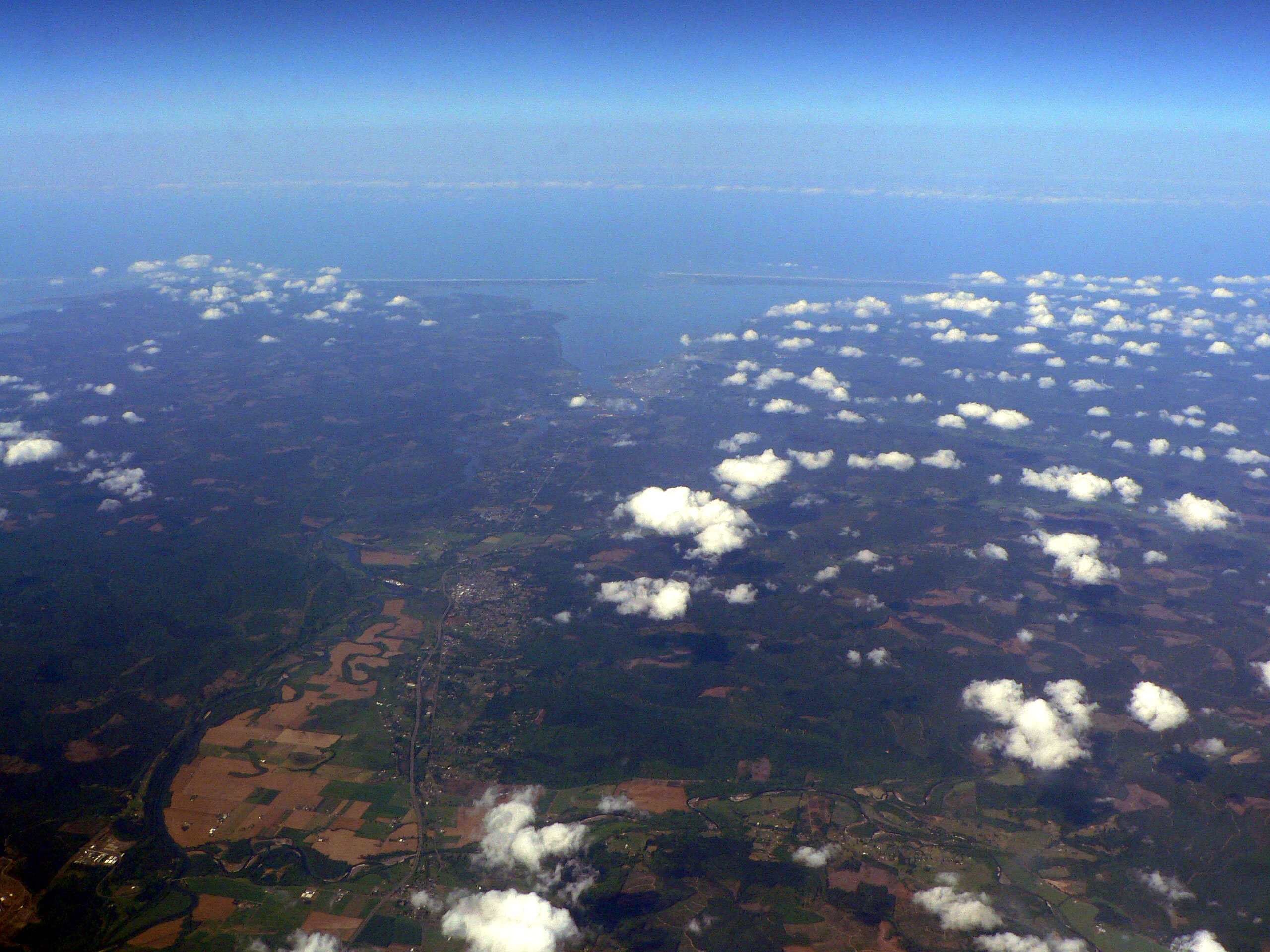
- Looking west through Chehalis Gap; Chehalis River (left of center) leading to Grays Harbor (middle distance) and Pacific Ocean (far distance)
- Interactive map of Chehalis Gap
- Elevation: 463 ft (141 m)
- Traversed by: U.S. Route 12, fmr. U.S. Route 410, Puget Sound and Pacific Railroad

Third Approach
- Location: Washington, United States
- Range: Coast Range
- Coordinates: 47°0′N 123°5′W

The Chehalis Gap is a gap in the Coast Range of Washington state between the southernmost foothills of the Olympic Mountains called the Satsop Hills, and the Willapa Hills.

The gap is a major geographic feature of the northwestern United States. Other geographic features in the gap include Chehalis River, Grays Harbor, and Grays Harbor National Wildlife Refuge in its estuary. U.S. Route 12 runs through the gap from Elma near Capitol State Forest to Aberdeen on Grays Harbor near the coast, paralleled by the former U.S. Route 410 and Puget Sound and Pacific Railroad.

== Formation ==
The broad valley in the gap is considered outsized for the river it now carries, the Chehalis River, theorized to be due to its enlargement during the Pleistocene ice age when it carried meltwater from mile-high glaciers in what is now Puget Sound.

== Climate and meteorology ==
The gap is responsible for climate and meteorological effects in Puget Sound region, including the Puget Sound Convergence Zone, marine push, diurnal wind circulation (sea breeze), and the relatively high precipitation compared to areas in the Olympic Mountains' rain shadow. Without the gap, the climate would be similar to that of semiarid Eastern Washington. Cities closest to the gap, Olympia as an example, receive more rain compared to cities farther away, such as Seattle. Air quality in the Puget Sound region is also affected by availability of fresh Pacific air from the Chehalis Gap to recharge the air which otherwise can stagnate and trap air pollution from industry and vehicles in the Seattle metropolitan area.

There are indications that a low level jet may be associated with the Chehalis Gap.

== Water ==
Municipal water supply in the Puget Sound metropolitan area is dependent on the rainfall which is in part attributed to the presence of the Chehalis Gap. The unique climate and topography of the Puget Sound region mean that water from weather systems from the Pacific, particularly winter storms, falls preferentially in southwestern facing, elevated areas exposed to moist Pacific air, especially where the gap causes an "anti" rain shadow. Seattle, and Everett and Bremerton all have municipal reservoirs in the hills surrounding each city, sometimes tens of miles (kilometers) away.

== See also ==
- List of geographic features in Thurston County, Washington
- Mountain-gap wind
