= Schafer State Park =

State park in Washington, United States

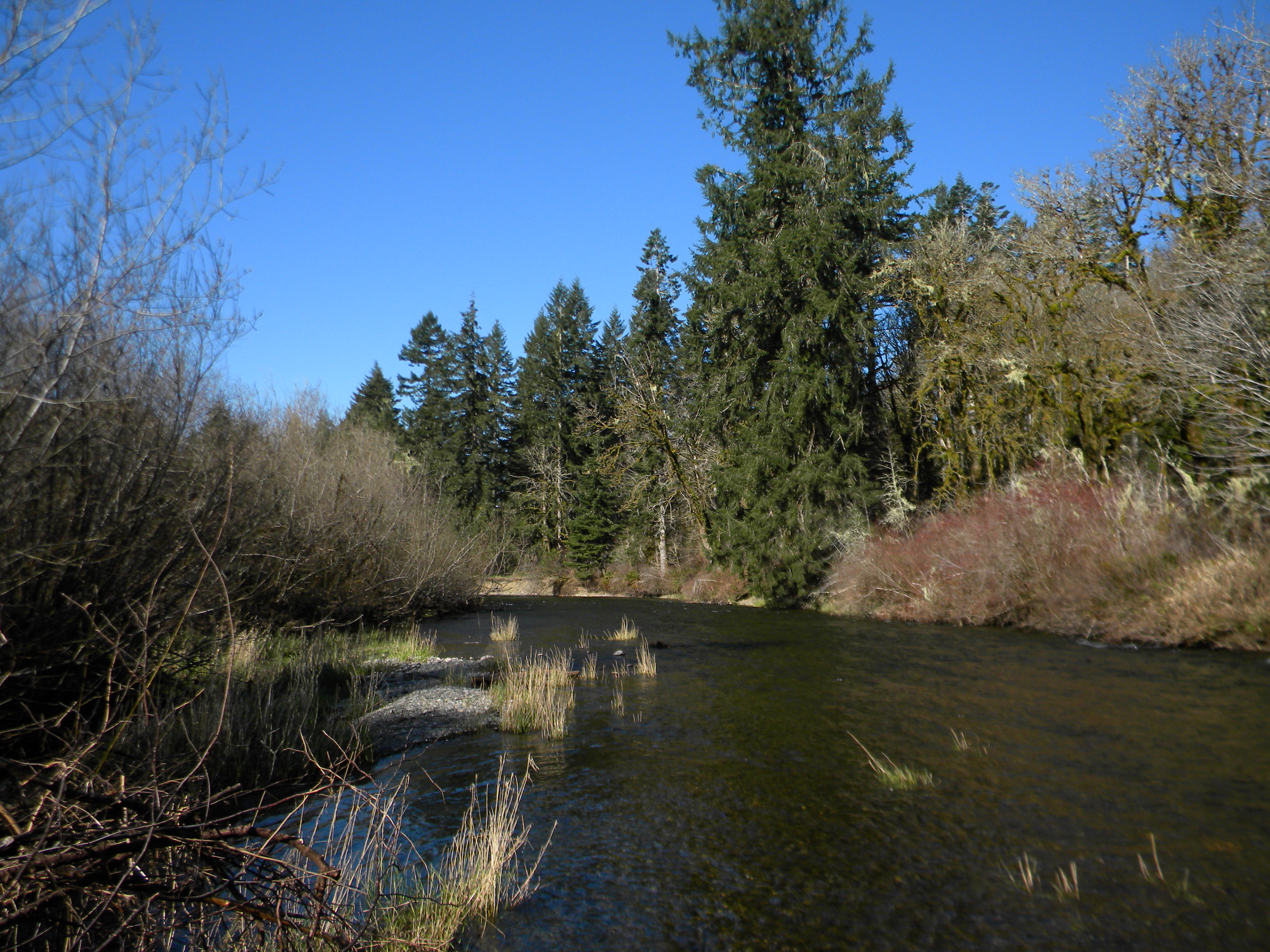
- Park view of the Satsop River

- Location within Washington (state) Location within the United States
- Location: Mason County, Washington, United States
- Coordinates: 47°05′52″N 123°27′57″W
- Area: 122 acres (49 ha)
- Elevation: 30 ft (9.1 m)
- Established: 1924
- Administrator: Washington State Parks and Recreation Commission
- Visitors: 133,493 (in 2024)
- Website: Official website
- Schafer State Park
- U.S. National Register of Historic Places
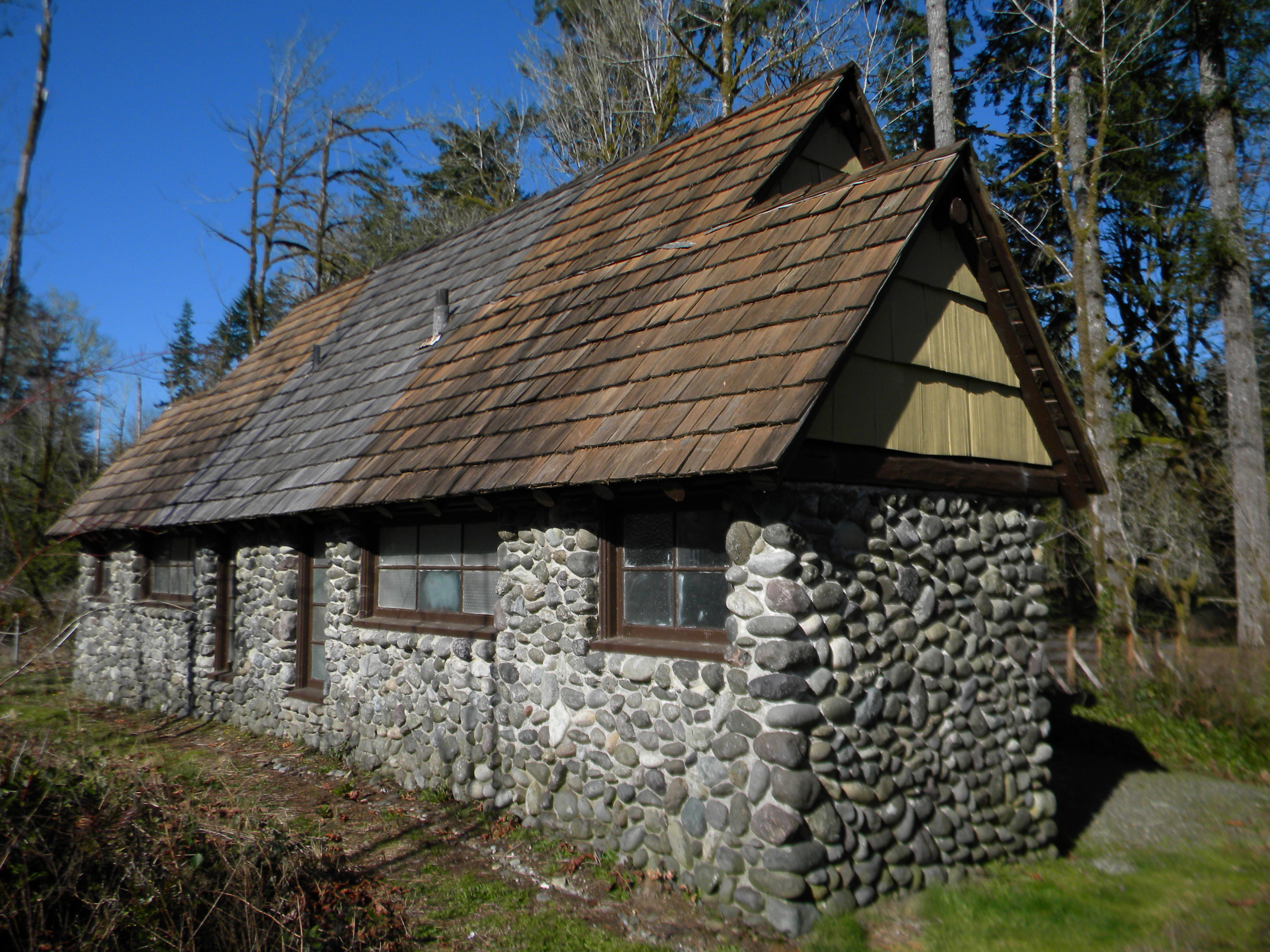
- Location: 1365 West Schafer Park Road, Elma, Mason County, Washington
- Area: 119.5 acres (48.4 ha)
- Built by: W.P.A
- Architect: C.C. "Doc" Palmer
- Architectural style: National Park Rustic
- NRHP reference No.: 10000255
- Added to NRHP: May 10, 2010

Schafer State Park is a public recreation area along the Satsop River located midway between Olympia and Aberdeen in the Satsop Hills of Mason County, Washington. The 122-acre (49 ha) state park offers camping, two miles of hiking trails, fishing (especially for steelhead), swimming, birdwatching, interpretive activities, wildlife viewing, and horseshoes. The park's abundance of historic structures led to its inclusion on the National Register of Historic Places in 2010.
