= Northwest Cannabis Solutions Satsop facility =

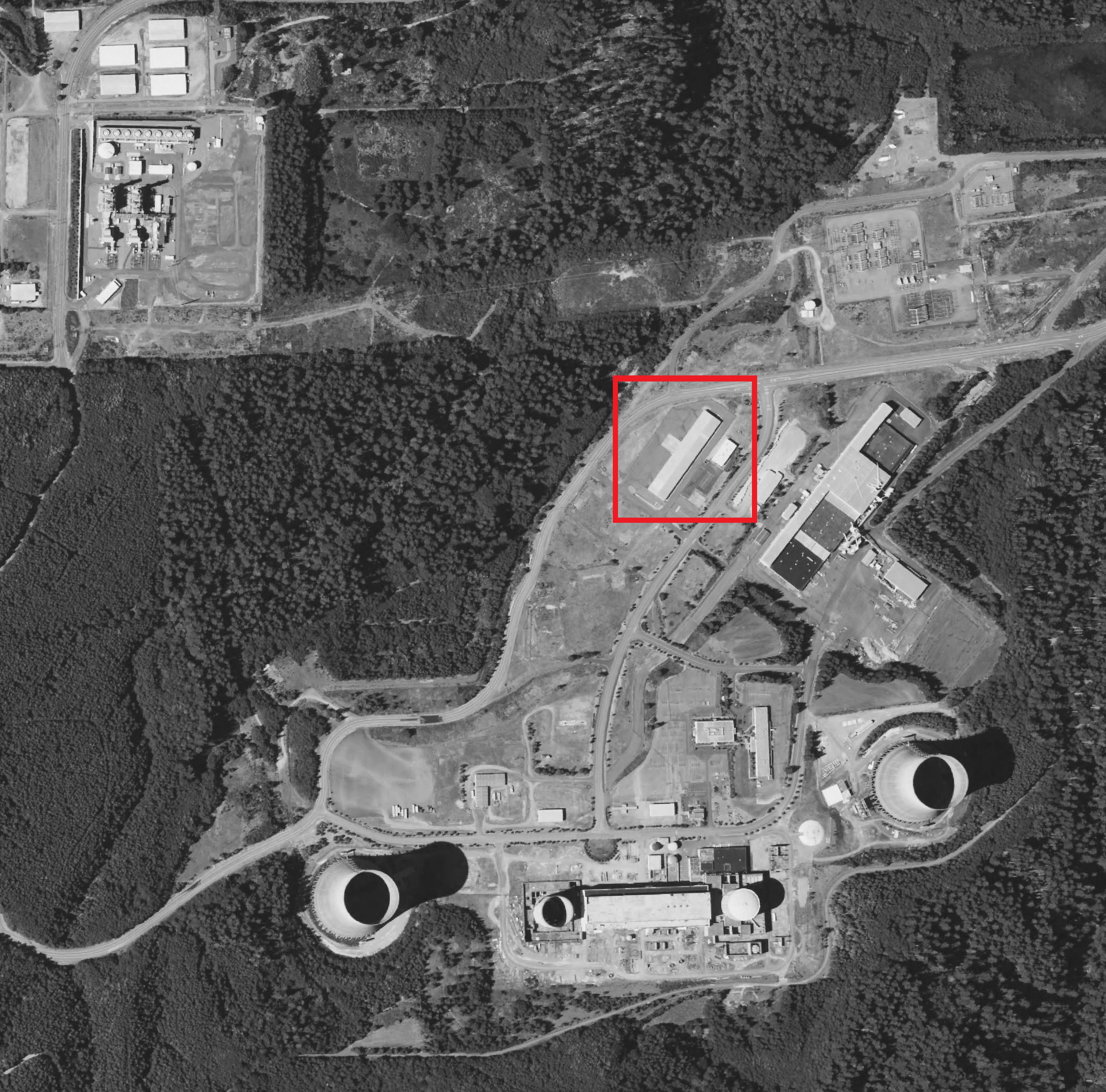
- Northwest Cannabis Solutions facility outlined (red box right of center) on 2013 aerial photograph also showing cooling towers, nuclear reactor containment buildings and steam turbine gallery (below center)

- Location within Washington (state)
- Former names: Enterprise Warehouse

General information
- Coordinates: 46.9655°N 123.4686°W
- Current tenants: Northwest Cannabis Solutions
- Completed: 1980
- Renovated: 2000 and 2016
- Client: Cannex Capital/Fuller Hill Development
- Owner: Port of Grays Harbor

Dimensions
- Other dimensions: 500 ft × 100 ft (152 m × 30 m)

Technical details
- Floor count: 2
- Floor area: 50,000 sq ft (4,600 m^{2})

The Northwest Cannabis Solutions Satsop facility is a 50,000-square-foot (4,600 m^{2}) indoor cannabis growing facility at the Satsop Business Park in Satsop, Washington occupied by Northwest Cannabis Solutions, the largest I-502 legal cannabis grower in the State of Washington. The two-story facility was built in 1980 as part of the canceled Satsop Nuclear Power Plant complex built by WPPSS, also called "Whoops!", and was leased from the new owner, Port of Grays Harbor by Northwest Cannabis in October 2016. When the company was preparing to move in, in late 2016–early 2017, three new transformers were installed to furnish 9,000 amps for 2,000 grow lights and a robust HVAC plant. Over six million dollars in improvements were made by the lessee, who executed a five-year lease with options to extend 45 more years.

Cannex Capital owns Northwest Cannabis and trades on the Canadian Securities Exchange. According to Bloomberg News, it has "the highest trailing revenue of any publicly traded U.S. cannabis company" in 2017. Its other subsidiary, Brightleaf Developments, owns property and property leases.

Northwest Cannabis Solutions had over a million dollars a month in sales in 2016 and produced 8,500 kilograms (18,700 lb) of wholesale cannabis in 2017. Processing occurs at the company's other location in Tumwater (46.948°N 122.943°W), near the Olympia Airport, employing 150 people in 2017. The new facility at Satsop was said to employ 60 to 70 more.

The Elma–Satsop area has had at least one other notable cannabis concern, Green Freedom.
