= Port of Grays Harbor =

Coordinates: 46.96°N 123.84°W

The Port of Grays Harbor is a port authority in Grays Harbor County, in the U.S. state of Washington. The Port owns waterfront facilities in Aberdeen and Hoquiam; Bowerman Airport near Hoquiam, the only jet-capable airport on the Washington coast; and the grounds of the former Satsop Nuclear Power Plant in Satsop, which it bought in 2013 to turn into a business park. The port was established in 1911, in what was then Chehalis County. The deep-draft pier and terminal opened in September 1922 and by 1924, more than one billion board feet of lumber had been shipped. By the 2010s other industries had become more prominent, including imported and exported automobiles transported via roll-on/roll-off ships and a rental car reconditioning facility for cars destined to auction. It is the West Coast's largest automobile export port and the United States' closest deepwater port to Asia. At the time of its construction it was the only deepwater port on the Pacific north of San Francisco, and it remains Washington's only Pacific Coast (vice Puget Sound) deepwater port.

The port is served directly by Puget Sound and Pacific Railroad, which connects to the BNSF Railway network, and by U.S. Route 101; and is 45–50 miles (72–80 km) from Interstate 5 via U.S. Route 12 and State Route 8.

== See also ==
- Grays Harbor Historical Seaport Authority
- List of Panamax ports § United States
