= Wynoochee Dam =

Reservoir dam in Washington, United States

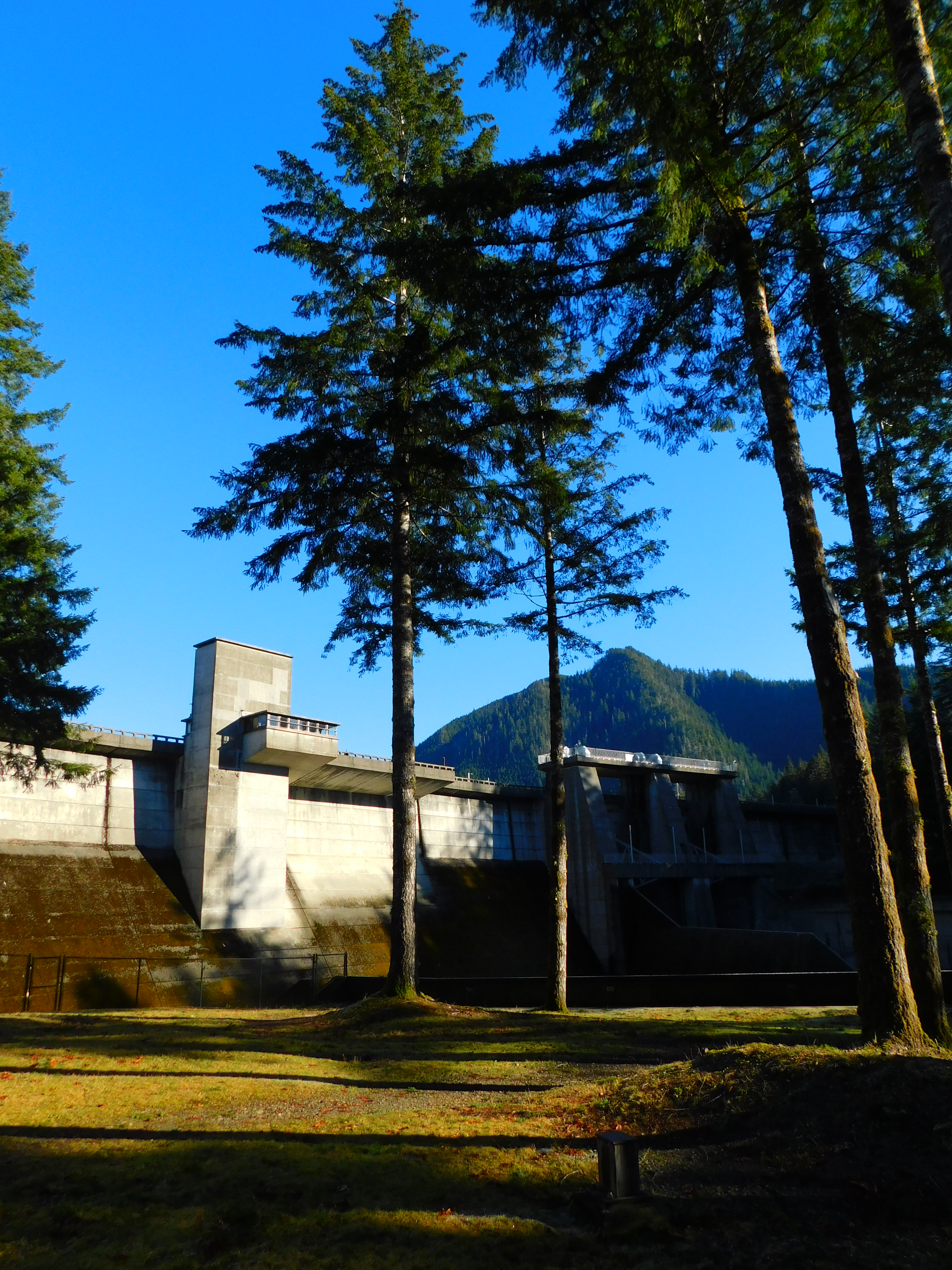
- Front view, Wynoochee Dam, 2025
- Interactive map of Wynoochee Dam
- Country: United States
- Location: Montesano, Washington
- Status: Operational
- Opening date: 1972
- Designed by: United States Army Corps of Engineers

Power Station
- Coordinates: 47°23′6″N 123°36′25″W

The Wynoochee Dam is 28 miles (45 km) north of Montesano, Washington. It is owned by the city of Aberdeen, Washington, and was built by the United States Army Corps of Engineers in 1972. The dam regulates the flow of the Wynoochee River, creating Wynoochee Reservoir. The Wynoochee Lake Shore Trail, designated a National Recreation Trail in 1979, runs 16 miles (26 km) around the lake.

== History ==
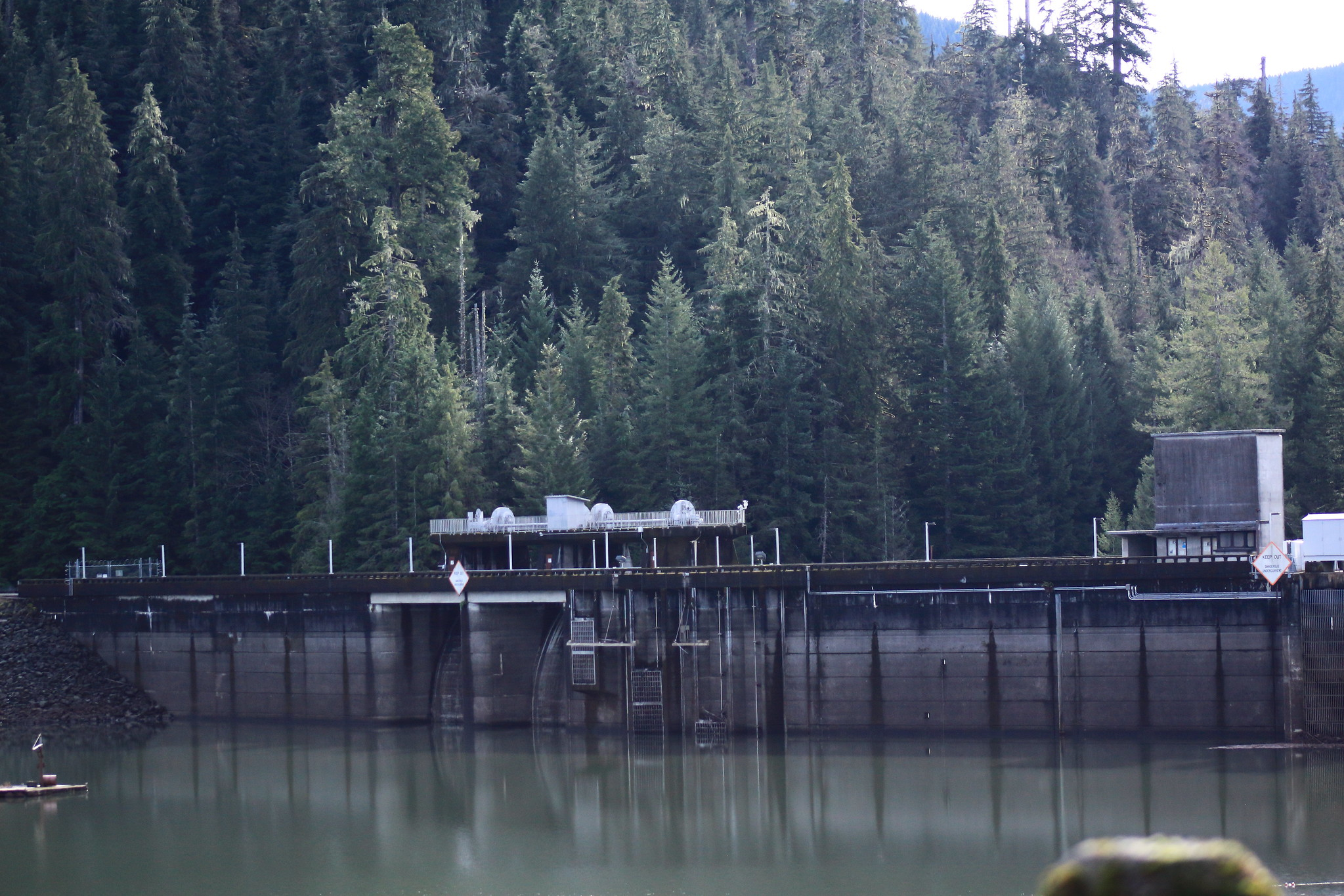
View from Lake Wynoochee

Joe Malinowski, the eldest son of Polish immigrants, located several dam sites in the early 1920s and acquired the water rights of the river. After a political battle with the private power company that served the city of Aberdeen he was offered $50,000 for those rights. Instead he sold the rights to the city for $1.00. Joe was still alive when the dam was finally built.

Tacoma Power added a 13MW hydroelectric generating plant downstream from the dam in 1994. Although access to the dam has been restricted since September 11, 2001, tours are available by appointment.

== Recreation ==
Coho Campground, managed by the Olympic National Forest, is upstream from the dam. The campground has running water, restrooms, has a day use area, with cooking pits. There are 46 sites in the campground with fire pits and picnic tables, room for tents, trailers, motor homes, and these sites are charged a fee. There is also a boat ramp. There is a camp host there almost every day. Tacoma Power operates a day use picnic and swimming area along the shore of the reservoir closest to the dam.

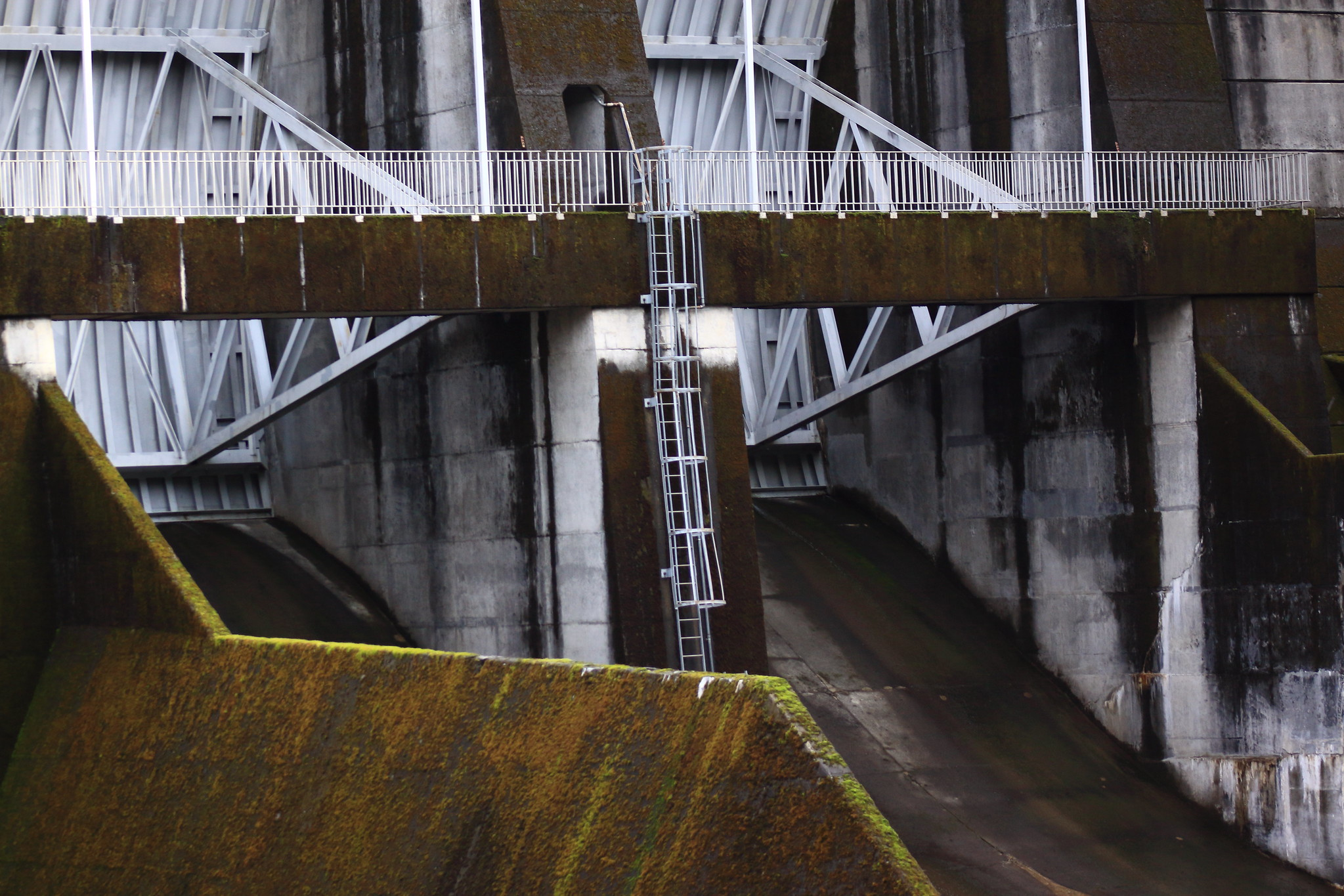
Front view, detail of spillway gates

Approximately 16 miles (26 km) of the Upper Wynoochee Valley Road (Forest Service Development Rd 22) has been paved including the access road for the Wynoochee dam and recreational areas, this includes the Coho camp ground. This allows much faster traveling to and from the dam from Hwy 12 and the city of Montesano. The Donkey Creek Road (also Forest Service Development Rd 22) from Hwy 101 to the dam is currently paved from Highway 101 into the National Forest approximately 7 miles (11 km), and gravel the remainder of the way to the junction of FS2294.
