= Chehalis River =

River in Washington state, United States

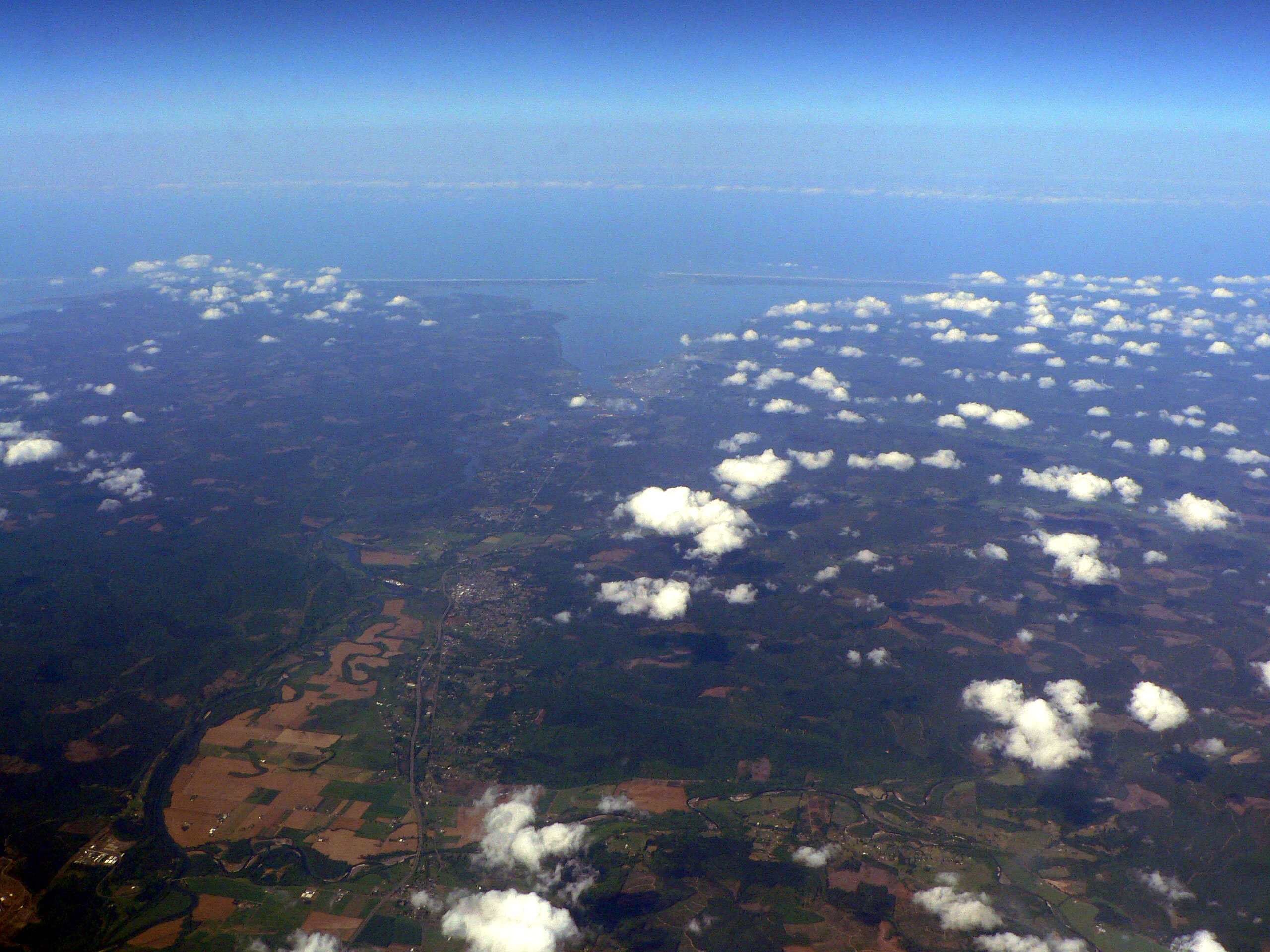
- Chehalis River Valley (left), Grays Harbor (middle distance) and Satsop River Valley (along bottom)

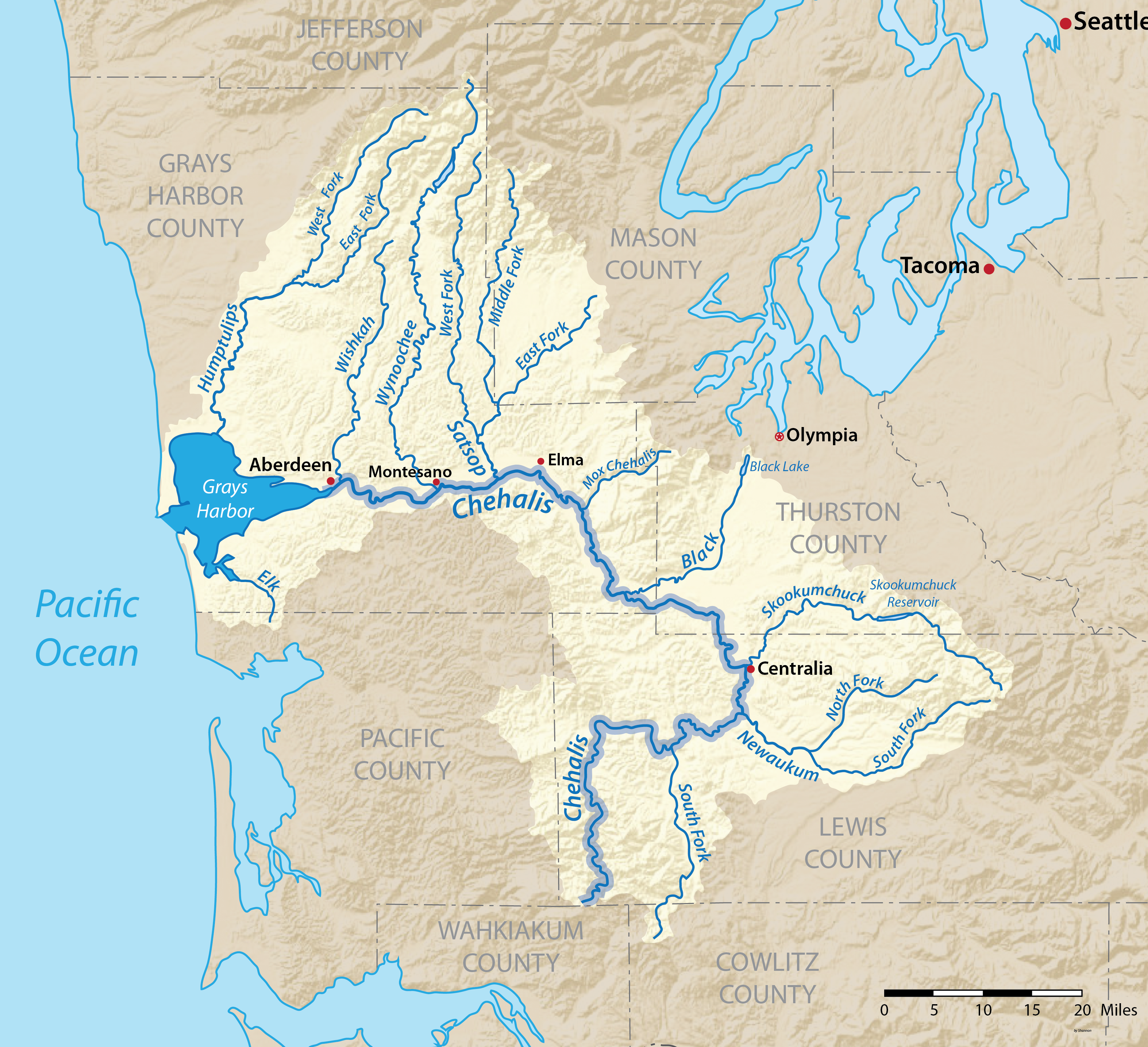
- Map of the Chehalis River watershed

- Mouth of the Chehalis River in Washington Chehalis River (the United States)

Location
- Country: United States
- State: Washington
- Counties: Grays Harbor, Lewis, Mason, Thurston
- Cities: Aberdeen, Centralia, Chehalis

Physical characteristics
- Source
  - location: Lewis County
  - coordinates: 46°27′6″N 123°17′30″W
  - elevation: 1,000 ft (300 m)
- Mouth: Pacific Ocean
  - location: Grays Harbor, Aberdeen
  - coordinates: 46°57′29″N 123°50′5″W
  - elevation: 0 ft (0 m)
- Length: 115 mi (185 km)
- Basin size: 2,660 sq mi (6,900 km^{2})
- Discharge
  - location: near Satsop, WA
  - average: 6,425 cu ft/s (181.9 m^{3}/s)
  - minimum: 440 cu ft/s (12 m^{3}/s)
  - maximum: 47,000 cu ft/s (1,300 m^{3}/s)
- Discharge
  - location: mouth (Grays Harbor)
  - average: 11,208 cu ft/s (317.4 m^{3}/s)

Basin features
- Tributaries
  - right: South Fork Chehalis River, Newaukum River, Skookumchuck River, Satsop River, Wynoochee River, Wishkah River
- GNIS feature ID: 1503931 (Chehalis River), 1504633 (East Fork Chehalis River), 1513210 (South Fork Chehalis River)

The Chehalis River (/ʃəˈheɪlɪs/ shə-HAY-liss) is a river in Washington in the United States. It originates in several forks in southwestern Washington, flows east, then north, then west, in a large curve, before emptying into Grays Harbor, an estuary of the Pacific Ocean. The river is the largest solely contained drainage basin in the state.

== History ==
=== Last Glacial Period ===
The river was once much larger during the Ice Age when the tongue of the glacial ice sheet covering the Puget Sound terminated near Olympia and glacial runoff formed a large torrent of meltwater. This carved a large oversized valley that is much larger than the current river could have produced. The river's mouth was out near current Westport until rising sea levels at the end of the ice age flooded the broad Chehalis Valley to form a ria, known today as Grays Harbor.

The glacial sheet tongue is known as the Puget Lobe which, when it began to melt, formed Glacial Lake Russell. The lake drained through the Chehalis River Valley and the slow deposits of glacial sediment raised the depressed valley.

=== Native American history ===
The Quinault Indian Nation and the Confederated Tribes of the Chehalis Reservation are stakeholders of the river. Though the people ceded the lands surrounding the Chehalis River upon the signing of the 1856 Treaty of Olympia, the tribes have retained fishing and hatchery rights.

=== Washington state history ===
Plans were raised during the presidency of Franklin Pierce to use the river as part of a canal stretching from Olympia to Grays Harbor. The idea was reintroduced multiple times during the 19th century but no official acts, nor construction of the waterway, materialized. Versions of the canal project persisted after the build of the Panama Canal and during the Great Depression, with scaled-down plans lasting into the 1970s.

=== Flooding ===
==== December 3, 2007, floods ====
During the Great Coastal Gale of 2007, a 20-mile (32 km) stretch of Interstate 5 was closed between exits 68 and 88 because of flooding from the Chehalis River, causing the roadway to be under about 10 feet (3.0 m) of water. The recommended detour added about four hours and 280 miles (450 km). It was not expected to reopen for several days. However, upon breaching a dike on Dec. 5, 2007, the water receded more quickly than anticipated. Amtrak train service between Portland, Oregon, and Vancouver, British Columbia, was also disrupted. Washington governor Christine Gregoire declared a state of emergency on December 3.

==== January 7, 2009, floods ====
During the January 7, 2009, Pacific Northwest storms, a 20-mile (32 km) stretch of Interstate 5 was closed in and around the cities of Centralia and Chehalis because of flooding from the Chehalis River, causing the roadway to be under several feet of water. Since the main east–west mountain passes were also closed during this event, the flooding from the Chehalis River essentially cut off interstate traffic to the Puget Sound area from the south, and no detour was available.

=== Water rights ===
The Chehalis River, along with the Dungeness River, is part of only two river basins in Washington state that are granted protections and rights under "in-stream flow regulation". Passed in 1976, the law allows the river the right to maintain its own water levels. Unfettered access to the river is granted to grandfathered "senior" rights holders as they existed before the 1976 rule went into effect; the senior holders mostly consist of tribal communities and farmers. As of 2023, there are 93 recorded junior water rights holders, mostly homeowners, in the Chehalis basin.

== Course ==
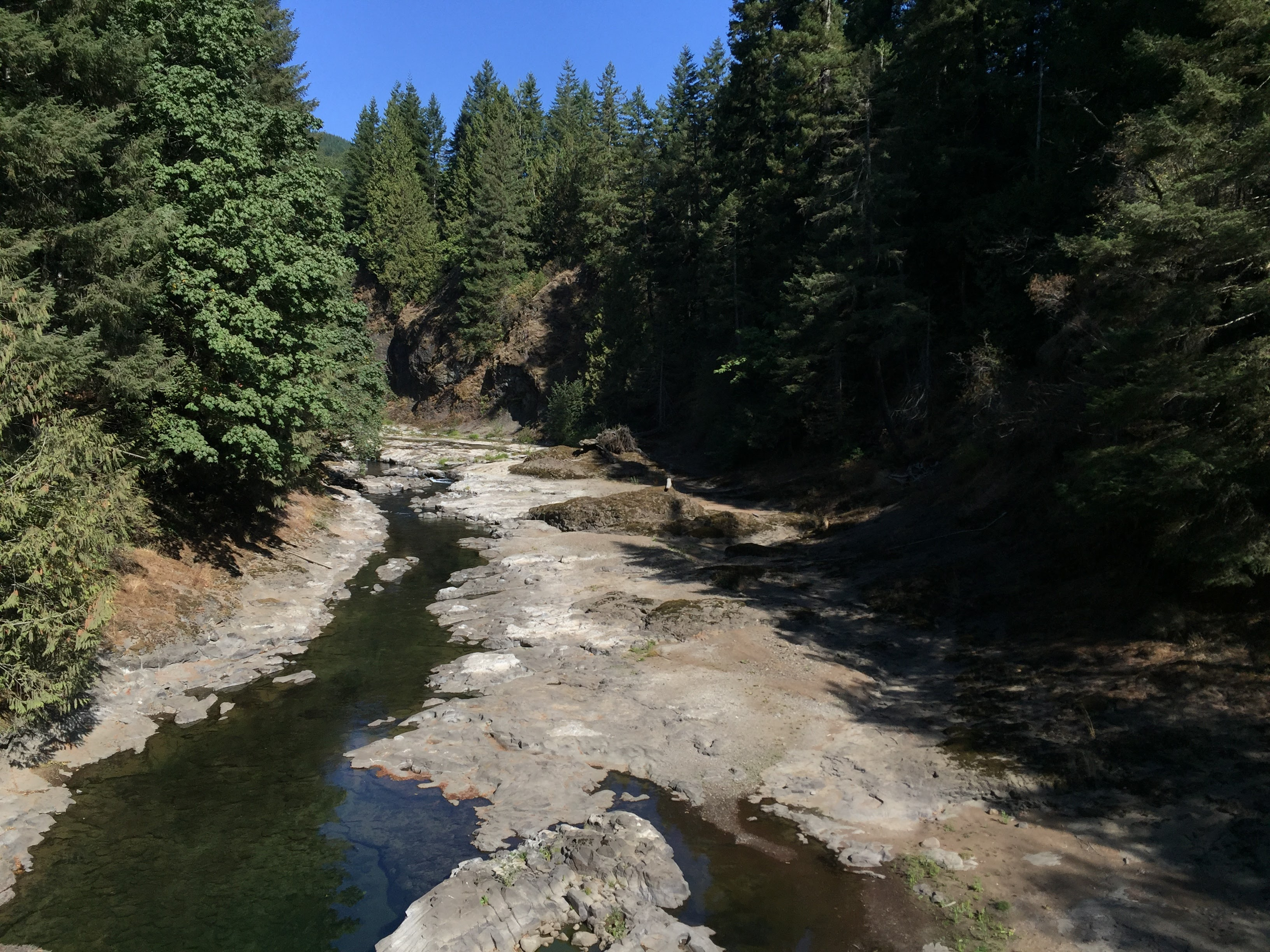
The Upper Chehalis near Pe Ell, Washington

The Chehalis River is the largest drainage basin completely within the state and the second largest overall in Washington. The basin covers a total of 3,400 square miles (8,800 km^{2}) of which approximately 2,700 square miles (7,000 km^{2}) is contained in Grays Harbor, Lewis, Mason, and Thurston counties. The waterway is an economic necessity, and a source for food, water, and recreation for several large cities, such as Aberdeen, Centralia, Chehalis, and Hoquiam. The river continues to be a cultural and economic staple for the Confederated Tribes of the Chehalis Reservation and the Quinault Indian Nation.

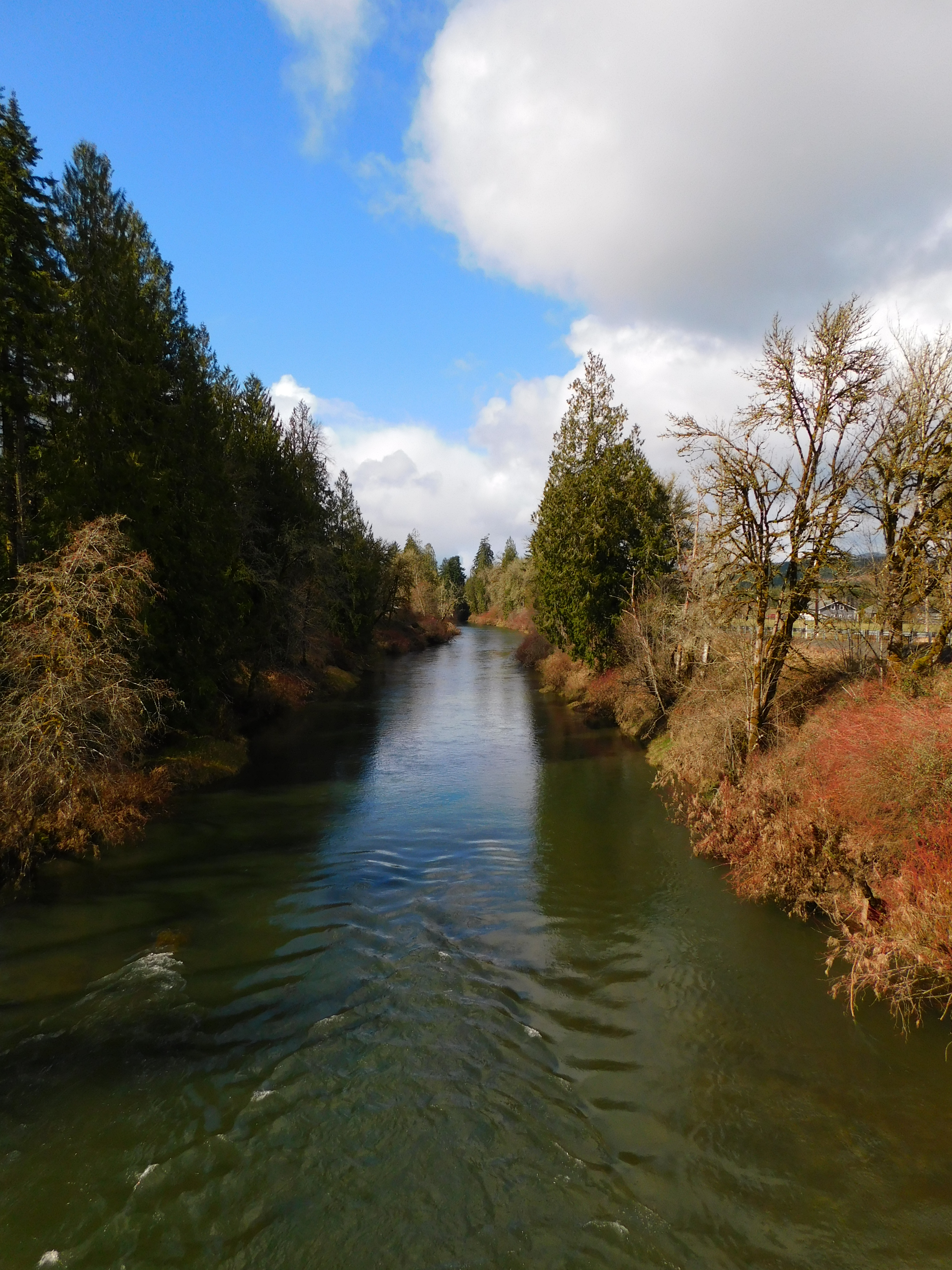
Chehalis River near Dryad; Mays Bridge, 2025

The Chehalis River begins at the confluence of the West Fork Chehalis River and East Fork Chehalis River, in southwestern Lewis County. From there the Chehalis flows north and east, collecting tributary streams that drain the Willapa Hills and other low mountains of southwestern Washington. The South Fork Chehalis River joins the main river a few miles west of the city of Chehalis. The Newaukum River joins the Chehalis River at Chehalis, after which the river turns north, flowing by the city of Centralia, where the Skookumchuck River joins. After Centralia, the Chehalis River flows north and west, collecting tributaries such as Scatter Creek and the Black River, which drains the Black Hills to the north, then in the Chehalis Gap collects the Satsop River and Wynoochee River, which drain the southern part of the Olympic Mountains.

The Wynoochee River joins the Chehalis near Montesano, after which the Chehalis River becomes increasingly affected by tides and widens into Grays Harbor estuary. The city of Aberdeen lies at the mouth of the Chehalis River. Just east of Aberdeen, the Wishkah River joins the Chehalis, and just west, between Aberdeen and Hoquiam, the Hoquiam River joins. At this point the river has become Grays Harbor. Before the estuary of Grays Harbor empties into the Pacific Ocean, the Humptulips River joins the watershed. (Note: The consideration of the Humptulips River as a tributary of the Chehalis River is disputed.)

Additional tributaries to the Chehalis River include Elk River and Johns River.

== Flood control ==
Flood control and concerns for the Chehalis River and its watershed is managed by the Chehalis River Basin Flood Authority, which is overseen and funded by the Washington Department of Ecology Office of Chehalis Basin (OCB).

In 2010, the flood authority implemented the installation of an online flood warning system available to residents in the Chehalis basin. Known as the Chehalis Basin Flood Warning System, it expanded a sensor network already in place, providing information on rainfall and temperature, as well as additional gauges. Alert warnings are sent via email and provide information on 13 rivers in the area. The system won the 2023 National Hydrologic Warning Council (NHWC) Operational Excellence Award

=== Chehalis Basin Strategy ===
Counties within the Chehalis River basin, various other regional governments, and the Washington Department of Fish and Wildlife (WDFW), in association with Native American tribes, environmental groups, scientists, and local citizens, organized a partnership in 2014 named the Chehalis Basin Strategy to propose and research a combination of plans along the Chehalis River to mitigate flooding and to restore aquatic habitat, particularly for local Chinook salmon. The initial proposal outlined several flood control reduction measures, with downstream levee improvements particularly at the Chehalis–Centralia Airport, and a flood retention dam in Pe Ell which is planned to limit catastrophic damage from 100-year floods within the Chehalis River Basin.

== Environment and ecology ==
A waterweed known as Brazilian elodea, has been an invasive plant in the river since 1998. The plant has been recorded as spreading from Plummer Lake in Centralia, considered the source of the infestation, to Montesano. The invasive species was most likely introduced by the dumping of a personal aquarium. Efforts to eradicate the weed from the lake in the 2020s led to a noticeable decrease of elodea in the area. A four-year fund of up to $1.3 million from the Aquatic Species Restoration Program (ASRP) was made available in May 2026 to the Grays Harbor Noxious Weed Control Board to begin a project to remove and eradicate the plants from the river and sloughs between Plummer Lake and Montesano. The efforts are to include physical removal by divers and herbicides in sloughs where disturbed sediment hinders manual extraction.

== Wildlife ==
The river is home to several salmon species, including chum, coho and Fall Chinook, and the basin is also a habitat for Steelhead trout. In 2018, the Chehalis was the only river basin in the state in which any classification of salmon was not listed as an endangered species, despite decreasing numbers of the fish. A petition was filed by conservation groups in 2023 to list the Chinook salmon as endangered under the Endangered Species Act.

== Chehalis River Surge Plain Natural Area Preserve ==
The Chehalis River Surge Plain Natural Area Preserve is located between Montesano and Cosmopolis, south of US 12. The site was once called "Preacher's Slough" after a story of spiritual leader who became lost while visiting his followers in the area. The nature preserve is over 2,600 acres (1,100 ha) in size and contains a flat, rail trail that spans approximately 3.5 miles (5.6 km). The path, once part of Union Pacific and the Milwaukee Road, courses through several varieties of landscape, such as brush, forests of Sitka spruce, and marsh and wetlands. Numerous sloughs, containing a variety of native fish, are located in the preserve which also hosts several avian species, such as bald eagles, and animals, including bear and deer.

== See also ==
- Flood history in Chehalis, Washington
- List of geographic features in Lewis County, Washington
- List of geographic features in Thurston County, Washington
- List of Washington rivers
