= Wynoochee River =

River in Washington state, United States

Wynoochee River river
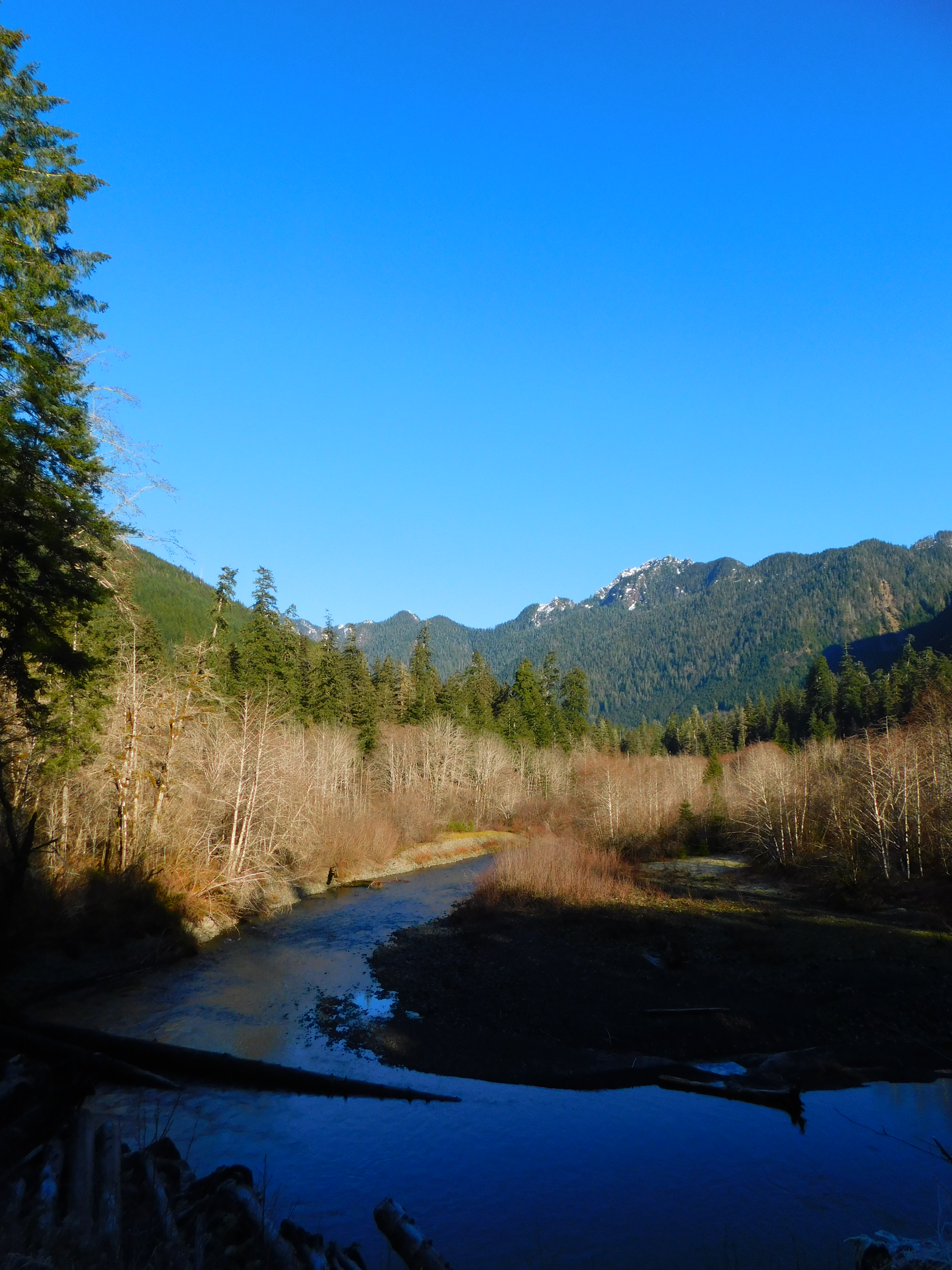
- Wynoochee River, north of Wynoochee Lake

- Location within Washington (state) Location within the United States

Location
- Country: United States
- State: Washington
- Counties: Grays Harbor
- Cities: Montesano

Physical characteristics
- Source: Wynoochee Canyon, Olympic Mountains
- Mouth: Montesano, Chehalis River (Washington)
  - coordinates: 46°57′42″N 123°36′33″W
- Length: 60 miles (97 km)
- Basin size: 218 sq mi (560 km^{2})

The Wynoochee River is a 60-mile (97 km) long river located in the Olympic Peninsula in the U.S. state of Washington.

== Etymology ==
The name Wynoochee comes from the Lower Chehalis placename /xʷənúɬč/, meaning "shifting". The earliest recorded use of the geographic name is March 1, 1854.

== Course ==
A tributary of the Chehalis River, the Wynoochee River rises in the Olympic Mountains within the Olympic National Park and flows generally south. Its drainage basin is 218 square miles (560 km^{2}) in area.

=== Wynoochee Canyon ===
The river has created Wynoochee Canyon in the hills it passes through. The wreckage of a train including locomotive and rail cars blown up and smashed during the making of 1961 film Ring of Fire is in the canyon.

== Wynoochee Dam and Lake ==
Wynoochee Lake dam (47°23′08″N 123°36′16″W in Grays Harbor County) is a concrete gravity dam in the Olympic National Forest on river mile 51.8 of the Wynoochee. Construction started in 1969 and was completed in 1972. The dam is used for flood control, water supply, recreation on its reservoir, Wynoochee Lake.

== History ==
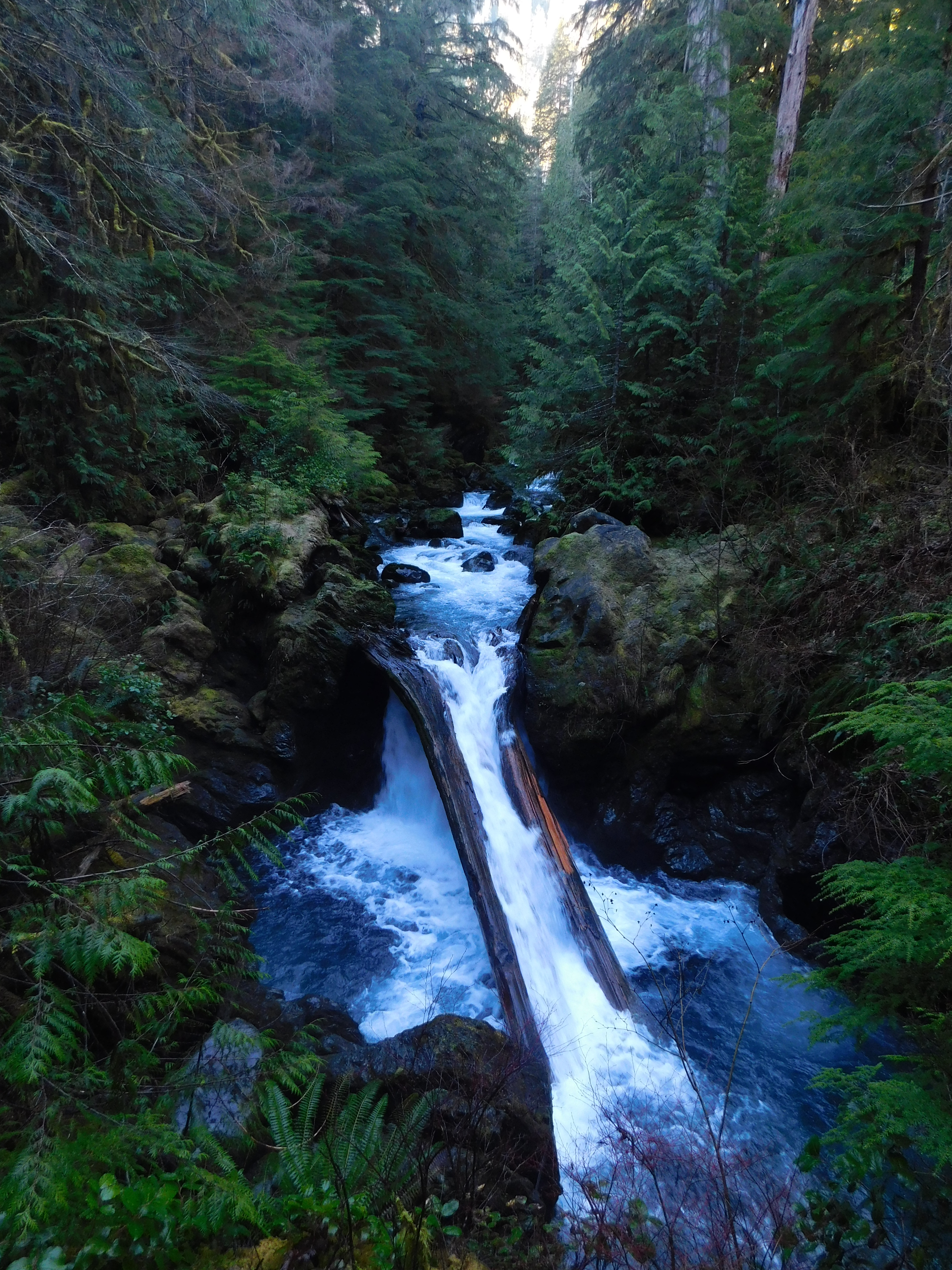
Maidenhair Falls, West Branch Wynoochee River

The city of Montesano was a recipient of the installation of flood control measures near Montesano's wastewater treatment plant which rests near the river. As part of the Chehalis Basin Strategy, log jacks were placed during 2018-2019 that helped increase the riverbank of the migrating river, which was threatening the plant that during flooding would have inundated the community with sewage runoff. The fortification increased the habitat of aquatic species and extended the operating life of the plant by several decades.

== See also ==
- List of Washington rivers
- Wynoochee Dam
- Grays Harbor County
