= Cosmopolis, Washington =

- City
- Interactive map of Cosmopolis, Washington
- Coordinates: 46°57′15″N 123°46′21″W
- Country: United States
- State: Washington
- County: Grays Harbor
- Incorporated: 1891

Government
  - Type: Mayor–council
  - Mayor: Linda Springer

Area
  - City: 1.58 sq mi (4.09 km^{2})
  - Land: 1.39 sq mi (3.60 km^{2})
  - Water: 0.19 sq mi (0.49 km^{2})
- Elevation: 23 ft (7.0 m)

Population (2020)
  - City: 1,638
  - Estimate (2022): 1,667
  - Density: 1,194.1/sq mi (461.05/km^{2})
  - Urban: 26,603
  - Metro: 77,038
- Time zone: UTC-8 (Pacific (PST))
  - Summer (DST): UTC-7 (PDT)
- ZIP Code: 98537
- Area code(s): 360, 564
- FIPS code: 53-14870
- GNIS feature ID: 2410238
- Website: cosmopoliswa.gov

Cosmopolis is a city in Grays Harbor County, Washington, United States. The population was 1,638 at the 2020 census. It lies on the Chehalis River and U.S. Route 101, immediately southeast of Aberdeen. Cosmopolis historically had an economy that centered around its pulp mill, which closed in 2006.

== History ==
The area around the mouth of the Chehalis River is the ancestral home of indigenous Coast Salish peoples who are today referred to as the Lower Chehalis. The first white settler in the area, James Pilkington, staked a Donation Land Act claim to 155.5 acres (62.9 ha) on the south bank of the river in 1852. The site was later used for unsuccessful negotiations between indigenous representatives and the Washington territorial government for the 1855 Chehalis River Treaty. Pilkington built a cabin on the land, but later sold the property in 1853 to Kentucky-born emigrants David F. Byles and Austin E. Young. Byles and Young proposed a plat for a town named Cosmopolis on the south bank of the Chehalis River. The origin of the name is unclear; one account is that it came from an indigenous chief's name, and another claims that an earlier settler asked for a name that means "city of the whole world".

Cosmopolis was platted in 1861 and is considered the oldest modern settlement in Grays Harbor County (then known as Chehalis County). Several settlers had attempted to build the townsite as planned, but failed due to various business issues. A lumber mill opened in 1881 and soon became profitable, bringing other businesses to Cosmopolis, which was incorporated as a town in 1891. The Northern Pacific Railway constructed a spur line through the new town in 1892 that traveled across a bridge to Junction City on the north side of the Chehalis River, with onward connections to Tacoma. The mill grew in the early 20th century under various owners until it was sold to Weyerhaeuser in 1957.

== Geography ==
Cosmopolis lies on the south side of the Chehalis River near its mouth at the head of Grays Harbor, an estuarine bay of the Pacific Ocean. Mill Creek, a short tributary of the Chehalis River, runs through the western part of the city. The city borders Aberdeen to the northwest. According to the United States Census Bureau, Cosmopolis has a total area of 1.52 square miles (3.94 km^{2}), of which, 1.33 square miles (3.44 km^{2}) is land and 0.19 square miles (0.49 km^{2}) is water.

=== Climate ===
This region experiences warm (but not hot) and dry summers, with no average monthly temperatures above 71.6 °F (22.0 °C). According to the Köppen Climate Classification system, Cosmopolis has a warm-summer Mediterranean climate, abbreviated "Csb" on climate maps.

== Demographics ==
Historical population
Census	Pop.	Note	%±
1890	287		—
1900	1,004		249.8%
1910	1,132		12.7%
1920	1,512		33.6%
1930	1,943		28.5%
1940	1,207		−37.9%
1950	1,164		−3.6%
1960	1,312		12.7%
1970	1,599		21.9%
1980	1,575		−1.5%
1990	1,372		−12.9%
2000	1,595		16.3%
2010	1,649		3.4%
2020	1,638		−0.7%
2022 (est.)	1,667		1.8%
U.S. Decennial Census; 2020 Census

=== 2020 census ===
As of the 2020 census, Cosmopolis had a population of 1,638. The median age was 44.0 years, with 20.4% of residents under the age of 18 and 22.9% 65 years of age or older. For every 100 females there were 91.1 males, and for every 100 females age 18 and over there were 93.2 males age 18 and over.

100.0% of residents lived in urban areas, while 0.0% lived in rural areas.

There were 685 households in Cosmopolis, of which 31.2% had children under the age of 18 living in them. Of all households, 46.4% were married-couple households, 18.7% were households with a male householder and no spouse or partner present, and 25.7% were households with a female householder and no spouse or partner present. About 27.9% of all households were made up of individuals and 14.2% had someone living alone who was 65 years of age or older.

There were 712 housing units, of which 3.8% were vacant. The homeowner vacancy rate was 0.9% and the rental vacancy rate was 1.9%.

Racial composition as of the 2020 census
Race	Number	Percent
White	1,387	84.7%
Black or African American	6	0.4%
American Indian and Alaska Native	50	3.1%
Asian	31	1.9%
Native Hawaiian and Other Pacific Islander	3	0.2%
Some other race	49	3.0%
Two or more races	112	6.8%
Hispanic or Latino (of any race)	128	7.8%

=== 2010 census ===
As of the 2010 census, there were 1,649 people, 677 households, and 463 families living in the city. The population density was 1,239.8 inhabitants per square mile (478.7/km^{2}). There were 714 housing units at an average density of 536.8 per square mile (207.3/km^{2}). The racial makeup of the city was 88.5% White, 0.1% African American, 1.6% Native American, 3.0% Asian, 0.3% Pacific Islander, 3.6% from other races, and 2.9% from two or more races. Hispanic or Latino of any race were 6.1% of the population.

There were 677 households, of which 31.9% had children under the age of 18 living with them, 52.4% were married couples living together, 9.7% had a female householder with no husband present, 6.2% had a male householder with no wife present, and 31.6% were non-families. 24.8% of all households were made up of individuals, and 10.2% had someone living alone who was 65 years of age or older. The average household size was 2.44 and the average family size was 2.87.

The median age in the city was 41.5 years. 22.6% of residents were under the age of 18; 7.5% were between the ages of 18 and 24; 24.9% were from 25 to 44; 28.9% were from 45 to 64; and 16.3% were 65 years of age or older. The gender makeup of the city was 48.9% male and 51.1% female.

=== 2000 census ===
As of the 2000 census, there were 1,595 people, 645 households, and 454 families living in the city. The population density was 1,142.3 people per square mile (439.9/km^{2}). There were 681 housing units at an average density of 487.7 per square mile (187.8/km^{2}). The racial makeup of the city was 93.04% White, 0.13% African American, 1.76% Native American, 1.50% Asian, 0.06% Pacific Islander, 1.19% from other races, and 2.32% from two or more races. Hispanic or Latino of any race were 3.32% of the population. 17.3% were of German, 10.0% Irish, 9.6% American, 7.7% Polish, 6.1% English and 5.0% Italian ancestry.

There were 645 households, out of which 30.5% had children under the age of 18 living with them, 57.8% were married couples living together, 10.2% had a female householder with no husband present, and 29.6% were non-families. 25.0% of all households were made up of individuals, and 9.5% had someone living alone who was 65 years of age or older. The average household size was 2.47 and the average family size was 2.92.

In the city, the population was spread out, with 25.8% under the age of 18, 6.8% from 18 to 24, 27.1% from 25 to 44, 25.5% from 45 to 64, and 14.9% who were 65 years of age or older. The median age was 39 years. For every 100 females, there were 96.9 males. For every 100 females age 18 and over, there were 96.0 males.

The median income for a household in the city was $41,106, and the median income for a family was $51,000. Males had a median income of $41,411 versus $25,714 for females. The per capita income for the city was $18,759. About 7.4% of families and 11.3% of the population were below the poverty line, including 15.2% of those under age 18 and 9.2% of those age 65 or over.

== Government ==
The city operates as a mayor–council government with five elected councilmembers and a mayor. As of 2023, the city had 13 employees and $3.5 million in revenue (a decrease from $4.2 million in 2022). By 2025, Cosmopolis had deferred its major capital improvements to remain financially stable due to a small tax base.

== Parks and recreation ==
Cosmopolis is home to Mill Creek Park, a 39-acre (16 ha) green space that contains a pond. Native wildlife in the park include duck, geese and great blue heron.

Marenko Park is a 39 acres (16 ha) forested park located on the city's west side. The park contains over 2 miles (3.2 km) of paths; dogs and biking are allowed. The park also contains two public soccer fields.

== Economy ==
In 2006, Weyerhaeuser pulp mill operations shut down, costing the local community approximately 350 jobs and the city government about 40 percent of its tax revenue. A year earlier, Weyerhaeuser had closed their large-log saw mill in Aberdeen, losing 83 jobs. The Cosmopolis mill was purchased in late 2010 by the Gores Group and renamed Cosmo Specialty Fibers, which manufactured specialty pulps for export to Asia when it reopened in 2011. The mill closed in 2020 during the COVID-19 pandemic and briefly reopened in 2022 before closing again. Cosmo Specialty Fibers was fined several times for environmental violations by state and federal agencies, including a $2.3 million penalty issued in 2025 for chemical leaks by the Washington State Department of Ecology.

== Infrastructure ==
Cosmopolis lies along U.S. Route 101, a major highway that connects area of the Pacific Coast.

As part of the Chehalis Basin Strategy, a concrete, steel, and earthen dam was constructed on Mill Creek. Completed in 2018, the $3.1 million project replaced a 1913 dam that collapsed in 2008, forcing the closure of Mill Creek Park. While the old dam had hampered migrating fish, the new structure included fish ladders and local species of salmon and trout were recorded soon thereafter migrating past the dam.

As of 2023, the city services approximately 765 residents with water, sewer and stormwater utilities, generating approximately $1.33 million in annual revenue.

== Notable people ==
- Elton Bennett, artist
