= Satsop, Washington =

- Census-designated place
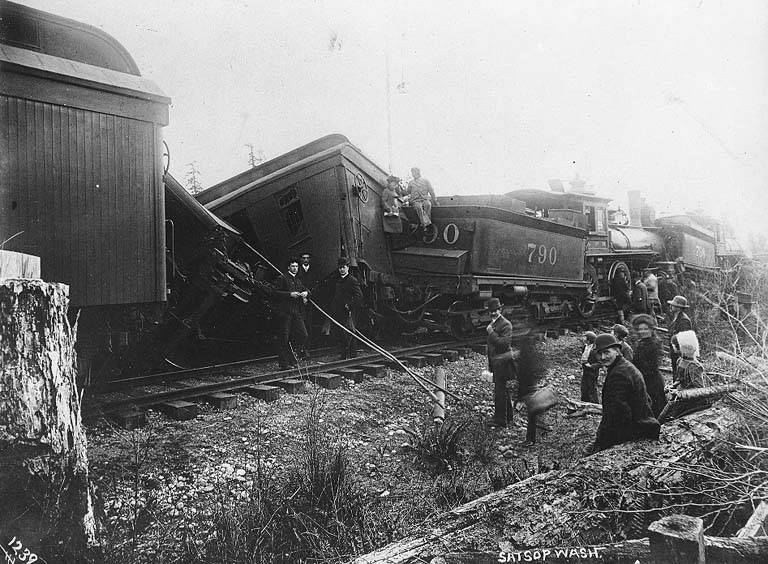
- Northern Pacific train wreck, Satsop, Washington, April 4, 1903

- Location of Satsop, Washington
- Coordinates: 47°00′21″N 123°28′30″W
- Country: United States
- State: Washington
- County: Grays Harbor

Area
  - Total: 7.0 sq mi (18.2 km^{2})
  - Land: 7.0 sq mi (18.2 km^{2})
  - Water: 0 sq mi (0.0 km^{2})
- Elevation: 66 ft (20 m)

Population (2020)
  - Total: 696
  - Density: 99.0/sq mi (38.2/km^{2})
- Time zone: UTC-8 (Pacific (PST))
  - Summer (DST): UTC-7 (PDT)
- ZIP Code: 98583
- Area code(s): 360, 564
- FIPS code: 53-61350
- GNIS feature ID: 2409287

Satsop is a census-designated place (CDP) in Grays Harbor County, Washington, United States. As of the 2020 census, Satsop had a population of 696.

== Geography ==
Satsop is located in southeastern Grays Harbor County on the Satsop River. U.S. Route 12 runs along the southern edge of the community, leading west 16 miles (26 km) to Aberdeen and southeast 30 miles (48 km) to Grand Mound. Olympia is 33 miles (53 km) to the east via Washington State Route 8.

According to the United States Census Bureau, the Satsop CDP has a total area of 7.0 square miles (18.2 km^{2}), all of it land.

== Demographics ==
Historical population
| Census | Pop. | Note | %± |
|---|---|---|---|
| 2000 | 619 | | — |
| 2010 | 675 | | 9.0% |
| 2020 | 696 | | 3.1% |
U.S. Decennial Census; 1990 2000 2010

Satsop first appeared as a census designated place in the 2000 U.S. census.

=== Racial and ethnic composition ===
Satsop CDP, Washington – Racial and ethnic composition Note: the US Census treats Hispanic/Latino as an ethnic category. This table excludes Latinos from the racial categories and assigns them to a separate category. Hispanics/Latinos may be of any race.
| Race / Ethnicity (NH = Non-Hispanic) | Pop 2000 | Pop 2010 | Pop 2020 | % 2000 | % 2010 | % 2020 |
|---|---|---|---|---|---|---|
| White alone (NH) | 581 | 630 | 607 | 93.86% | 93.33% | 87.21% |
| Black or African American alone (NH) | 6 | 0 | 1 | 0.97% | 0.00% | 0.14% |
| Native American or Alaska Native alone (NH) | 7 | 6 | 9 | 1.13% | 0.89% | 1.29% |
| Asian alone (NH) | 12 | 3 | 1 | 1.94% | 0.44% | 0.14% |
| Native Hawaiian or Pacific Islander alone (NH) | 0 | 0 | 0 | 0.00% | 0.00% | 0.00% |
| Other race alone (NH) | 0 | 2 | 1 | 0.00% | 0.30% | 0.14% |
| Mixed race or Multiracial (NH) | 2 | 17 | 36 | 0.32% | 2.52% | 5.17% |
| Hispanic or Latino (any race) | 11 | 17 | 41 | 1.78% | 2.52% | 5.89% |
| Total | 619 | 675 | 696 | 100.00% | 100.00% | 100.00% |

=== 2000 census ===
As of the census of 2000, there were 619 people, 228 households, and 166 families residing in the CDP. The population density was 88.6 people per square mile (34.2/km^{2}). There were 258 housing units at an average density of 36.9/sq mi (14.3/km^{2}). The racial makeup of the CDP was 94.67% White, 1.13% African American, 1.13% Native American, 1.94% Asian, 0.81% from other races, and 0.32% from two or more races. Hispanic or Latino of any race were 1.78% of the population.

There were 228 households, out of which 33.3% had children under the age of 18 living with them, 57.9% were married couples living together, 11.4% had a female householder with no husband present, and 26.8% were non-families. 22.4% of all households were made up of individuals, and 12.3% had someone living alone who was 65 years of age or older. The average household size was 2.71 and the average family size was 3.13.

In the CDP, the population was spread out, with 28.6% under the age of 18, 7.1% from 18 to 24, 25.7% from 25 to 44, 24.6% from 45 to 64, and 14.1% who were 65 years of age or older. The median age was 38 years. For every 100 females, there were 101.6 males. For every 100 females age 18 and over, there were 100.9 males.

The median income for a household in the CDP was $37,125, and the median income for a family was $43,125. Males had a median income of $31,000 versus $18,750 for females. The per capita income for the CDP was $14,245. About 9.5% of families and 16.8% of the population were below the poverty line, including 30.9% of those under age 18 and 5.8% of those age 65 or over.

== Landmarks ==
Satsop is the site of the planned Satsop Nuclear Power Plant, designed to house two 1,250-megawatt pressurized water reactors. Construction of the Satsop Nuclear Power Plant began in 1977 and was halted in 1983 after a $61 million budget shortfall, leaving the plant 75% complete. The twin cooling towers that are part of the unfinished plant are a well-known landmark in the area.

Satsop is located just east of the Satsop River. Both the hamlet and the river were named after a local Native American tribe.

== Economy ==
- Northwest Cannabis Solutions Satsop facility

== Education ==
Most of the community is in the Satsop School District. Portions to the east are in the Elma School District.
