= Chehalis, Washington =

- City
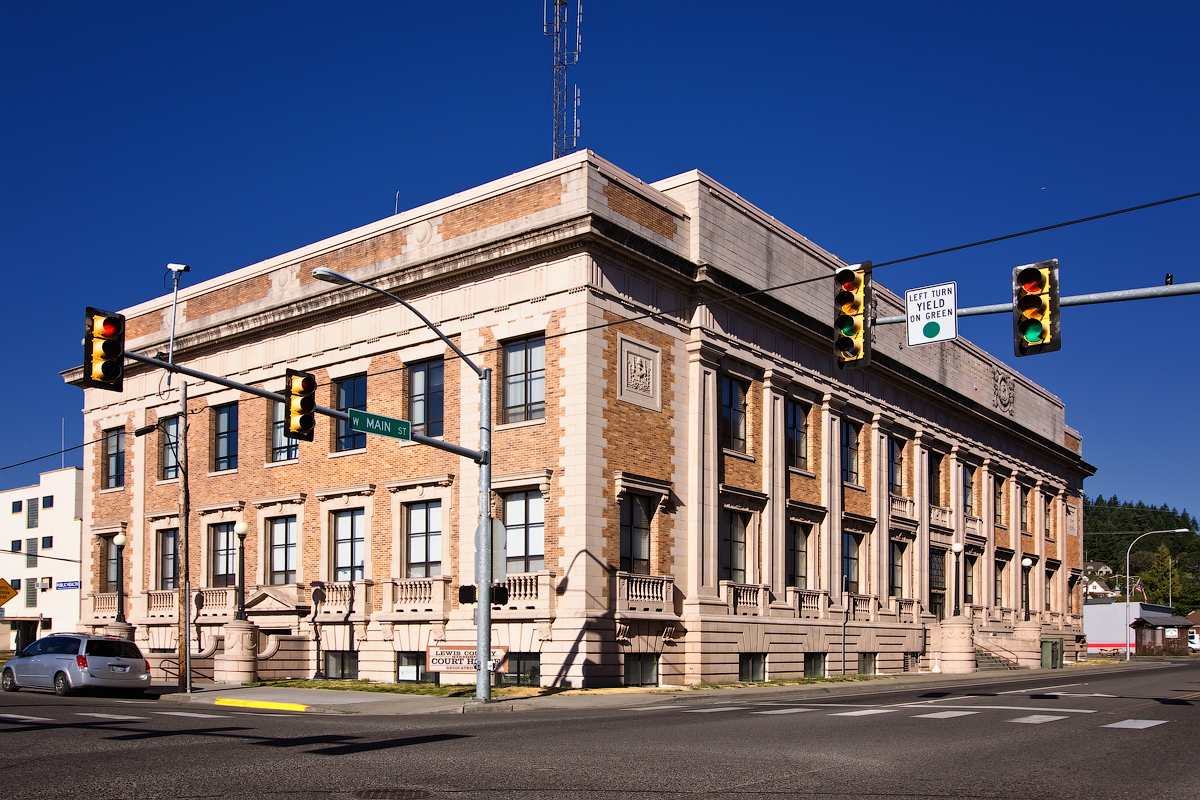

- Flag Seal
- Nicknames: the Rose City, the Mint City
- Motto: Where Heart and History Shape Our Future
- Location of Chehalis, Washington
- Coordinates: 46°39′50″N 122°57′54″W
- Country: United States
- State: Washington
- County: Lewis

Government
  - Type: Council–manager government
  - Mayor: Tony Ketchum

Area
  - Total: 5.88 sq mi (15.23 km^{2})
  - Land: 5.81 sq mi (15.04 km^{2})
  - Water: 0.073 sq mi (0.19 km^{2})
- Elevation: 282 ft (86 m)

Population (2020)
  - Total: 7,439
  - Density: 1,265.1/sq mi (488.44/km^{2})
- Time zone: UTC-8 (Pacific (PST))
  - Summer (DST): UTC-7 (PDT)
- ZIP Code: 98532
- Area code(s): 360, 564
- FIPS code: 53-11475
- GNIS feature ID: 2409439
- Website: ci.chehalis.wa.us

Chehalis (/ʃəˈheɪlɪs/ shə-HAY-liss) is a city in and the county seat of Lewis County, Washington, United States. The population was 7,439 at the time of the 2020 census.

The city is located in the Chehalis valley and is split by Interstate 5 (I-5) and State Route 6. It is twinned with the bordering city of Centralia. The community of Newaukum and the city of Napavine lie directly south, with the community of Adna to the west. Due to the city's location on the Chehalis River, and the nearby confluences of the Newaukum and Skookumchuck rivers, Chehalis has experienced several historic flooding events during its history.

Incorporated in 1883, Chehalis was primarily a logging and railroad town, with a shift towards farming in the mid-20th century. The city has bolstered its economy in the 21st century with a focus in manufacturing and warehousing.

Chehalis is home to the historic neighborhood of Claquato, the Chehalis–Centralia Airport, and the Southwest Washington Fairgrounds. The city has several distinct historical areas and boasts 11 locations on the list of National Register of Historic Places, more than any other region in Lewis County. Several museums that highlight motorcycles, veterans and military history, and the Chehalis history of railroads are located within the city limits. Chehalis contains approximately 273 acres (110 ha) of parks, most begun by land donations and are overseen by volunteer community efforts. The community is known locally for its annual summer event, ChehalisFest.

The city anchors the beginning trailhead for the Willapa Hills Trail and accommodates riders during the Seattle to Portland Bicycle Classic. Chehalis once was home to a championship minor league baseball team and often welcomed barnstorming ballclubs and competitions featuring teams from Negro league baseball.

In the 21st century, Chehalis initiated several charity, volunteer, and local government sponsored groups to revitalize the city, with focus on renovations to its historic downtown district, the upgrading of the community's transit sector, and increasing the education and graduation rate within the school district. Additional efforts of improvements were led via art programs and renovations to its parks.

== Etymology ==
The name "Chehalis", pronounced shə-HAY-liss, is derived from c̓x̣íl̕əš, the name of a principal village of the Lower Chehalis people, located near what is now Westport, Washington. It translates to "place of sand" or "shifting sand" in English. It has also been spelled Atchixe-lish, Chachelis, Checalish, Chehaylis, Chickeelas, Chixeelis, Ebihalis, Tcheles, Tsehalish, and Tse-he-lis. Early non-native explorers of the Pacific Northwest vocalized the words as "Chehalis" and proceeded to describe the original inhabitants as such.

The community was originally known as Saunder's Bottom and as the town of Saundersville, named after Schuyler and Eliza Saunders on whose donation land claim it was founded when they settled on the land in 1850. Differing timelines and recognition of the name change to Chehalis exist. A founding member of the community and its postmaster, Obadiah B. McFadden, renamed the town as Chehalis in 1870. (Note: The exact date that McFadden changed the name fluctuates depending on the source, often vaguely listed as 1870. He officially reestablished the local post office under the Chehalis moniker on September 23, 1870.) Another account claims officials for the Northern Pacific Railroad, in 1874, began to refer to the location as Chehalis but for unknown reasons. The naming was officially recognized by the state legislature on September 23, 1879. The Chehalis nomenclature is believed to denote its location to the Chehalis people and the Chehalis River.

The meaning of the names of Saunder's Bottom and Chehalis were fitting for the growing town due to the muddy bottomland along the Chehalis River which had long vexed stagecoach travelers on the Washington arm of the Oregon Trail between Kalama and New Market (Tumwater).

=== Motto and nickname ===
An early motto for the city, "What Chehalis makes makes Chehalis" was initiated under Mayor John West in late-1926. As red roses had long been a symbol of the community, including the All-America Rose Selections (AARS) accredited Chehalis Municipal Rose Garden, the city adopted the red rose as an official community flower in 1955, leading to the nickname for Chehalis, "The Rose City", which was made official in 2000. The city's motto, "A Heritage to be Proud Of" was concurrently adopted. The community has been informally known as "The Mint City" due to I.P. Callison's mint plant and as "The Friendly City", nomenclature born from social symbolism connected to roses. An attempt to change the official moniker to "The Friendly City" in 2009 did not pass, but the city changed its motto to "Where Heart and History Shape Our Future".

== History ==
Chehalis began as a settlement around a warehouse beside a railroad track in 1873, when the Northern Pacific Railroad built northward from Kalama to Tacoma. Northern Pacific's decision bypassed the town of Claquato, then the county seat. This allowed Chehalis, in 1874, to become the central location for Lewis County government. That same year, a store was added to the warehouse, and a courthouse and several houses were constructed. Chehalis was incorporated on November 23, 1883.

Logging soon began in the nearby forests. Lumber workers of Scandinavian, English, and Scots-Irish descent arrived and settled in the neighboring valleys. In 1940, the chief local industries were dairying, poultry raising, fruit growing, milk condensing, fruit and vegetable packing, brick and tile manufacturing, coal mining, portable house manufacturing, and fern shipping.

During World War II, Chehalis was home to a Boeing manufacturing plant. The factory was responsible for producing wing parts for airplanes, particularly for B-17 and B-29 bombers. The plant, which received Boeing's excellence pennant, existed between 1943 and 1945 and was located in the Harry B. Quick building. Built in the mid-1920s, it has been owned by the Lewis County Public Utilities District since the early 1940s. A plaque, installed on the exterior of the building in 2005 on the 60th anniversary of the war's end, honors the workers of the Boeing manufactory, of which 70% were Rosie the Riveters.

The city, known for its flooding events, suffered damages and hardship during other natural disasters and severe weather events. A report in the aftermath of the 1949 Olympia earthquake listed that approximately 40% of local Chehalis businesses and homes were damaged, including a tally of over 1,300 chimneys. One Chehalis resident was reported as injured and the Green Hill School, which lost the use of four buildings, recorded $2 million in damages. The high school and the West Side School were destroyed; neither was rebuilt. Chehalis was also hit hard during the Hanukkah Eve windstorm of 2006, with the interstate closed south of the city due to fallen trees.

A vessel in the United States Navy, the gunboat USS Chehalis (PGM-94), was named in honor of the city.

=== Flooding ===
Due to Chehalis being located near several large rivers and resting in a valley, heavy rains and snowmelt has led the city to experience numerous historic flooding events, often recorded between November and February.

Historical accounts and spiritual lessons passed down in the history of Native American people living in and around the Chehalis River tell of major floods in the basin. The first record of a flood, when the community known as Saundersville was settled, was in 1865. The first newspaper accounting of floods mention events in 1887 and 1897 that disrupted sawmill operations and river and railroad traffic.

The 20th century recorded over two dozen notable flooding events in and around the Chehalis community. The earliest recordings of floods are from 1906, 1909, and 1910, with major floods in 1915 and 1919. Chehalis, which was submerged in a month-long rain event, broke flood records in 1933 and moderate floods followed later in the decade. A 1948 weather pattern, a widespread disaster for the state, led to flooding in Chehalis. Heavy rains in the early-to-mid 1950s bought moderate floodwaters.

The Christmas flood of 1964 led to widespread floodwaters in 1965. A record-setting flood occurred in 1972, submerging the interstate for the first time in the city. The Chehalis River crested twice in January 1974, causing $10 million in losses. A major flood disaster developed in 1986 after 8 inches (20 cm) of rainfall over several days that led to the submerging of the fairgrounds and a contamination spill at a closed industrial site near Millett Field. The highway was covered with floodwaters again during a major flood disaster 1990. A 100-year flood occurred in February 1996, with the Chehalis and Skookumchuck rivers setting flood stage records. A state of emergency was declared and I-5 was closed for four days.

The city in the 21st century has had several floods of various levels including a record flood that closed the interstate in the town in December 2007 due to the Great Coastal Gale of 2007. Another major flood materialized over a year later in January 2009, immersing several regions within Chehalis, and I-5 and railroads were shut down once again. Less severe floods transpired during record daily rainfalls in 2010, 2012, and 2015. A stretch of I-5 between Chehalis and Centralia was closed for several hours after a major flood in January 2022.

=== Hate crimes and supremacy ===
Chehalis has not been immune to a history of hate crimes, racism, and white supremacy groups. An article written in the Chehalis Bee-Nugget newspaper from 1909 details a letter from a Black man who considered Chehalis a "white man's city" and would not move to the town. While the piece mentions that the people of Chehalis have not exhibited hostilities towards non-White people, the editorial does report that a Black family has never resided in the city while also acknowledging a lack of representation for citizens of Asian heritage. At the beginning of the 1910 Chehalis Gophers baseball season, the club and its ballplayers participated in a minstrel show, receiving positive reviews in a local paper. An "anti-Greek and Italian" movement existed in Chehalis around 1911 that demanded to abolish the employment of foreigners within the town.

In 1924, a rally for the Ku Klux Klan (KKK) was held at the Southwest Washington Fairgrounds and the estimated attendance was recorded between 20,000 and 30,000 members from around Washington. During the Great Depression, Chehalis and the surrounding cities and counties saw a rise in the participation of "Silver Shirts", a group that followed similar aspects to the Nazi movement of the era. In a Life magazine article from March 1939, the publication reported regarding hate groups and said Chehalis had a hate group leader in it, purportedly a local insurance man. A trio of female high school students wrote to the magazine, believing that the feature "did not accurately depict the feelings of local citizens" just the insurance man and his followers, and a follow-up photo article from Life in May showcased the city's actual more varied and "American ideals" atmosphere which tended to more highlight inclusion, tolerance and diversity. It was noted that the leader of that fascist group had left town after the original story had published.

After World War II, the emergence of the John Birch Society (JBS), which opposed the Civil Rights Movement of the 1960s, began to circulate in and around the community, though much of the group's noted activity occurred outside Chehalis with the group opening a bookstore in Centralia. Active and open participation from county residents in either the KKK or the JBS began to wane in the 1970s and 1980s, and the last activity of either group was recorded as taking place at the end of the century. The city, due to its early history and present-day lack of a Black population, was listed as a sundown town though there is no evidence the city ever had sundown policies.

Residents in the city in more recent years have protested in favor of the Black Lives Matter movement, holding two demonstrations in 2020 at the Lewis County Courthouse after the murder of George Floyd. The second event was attended by approximately 300 people who knelt for 8 minutes 46 seconds in protest against police brutality. Notwithstanding a brief interruption, the assembly remained peaceful.

A rise in hate crimes against LGBTQ people in the 21st century also affected Chehalis, usually perpetrated or led by non-Chehalis residents. In the 2020s, a billboard in Chehalis supporting LGBTQ and racial equality movements was vandalized. A drag show held in June 2023 at the Chehalis Theater was a site of controversy when a political fundraiser that referred to drag performers as "groomers" was hosted nearby without theater approval by the Lewis County GOP, headed by a non-Chehalis resident, and timed so as to coincide with the drag show in the Chehalis Theater and a similarly protested Pride event that had been held in Centralia earlier that day. The GOP's actions were condemned by local leaders shortly after. A few weeks later, a single-evening hate crime act occurred that targeted LGBTQ charities and symbols within various locations of the city. The Chehalis Friendship Fence was vandalized during the hate crime attack. The fence was repainted days later through a volunteer effort. The fence was targeted again in February 2024 after a group of three people, all with ties to a variety of hate groups, as well as previous hate crime acts, splashed the artwork with black paint. The perpetrators, who were not from Chehalis, were chased down by a local resident and caught; fellow neighbors were able to wipe the paint off before it dried but the damages were severe enough that parts of the local attraction needed to be repainted. The trio were found guilty of misdemeanor malicious mischief but were acquitted by jury on hate crime charges.

== Geography ==
According to the U.S. Census Bureau, the city has a total area of 5.55 square miles (14.37 km^{2}), of which, 5.53 square miles (14.32 km^{2}) is land and 0.02 square miles (0.05 km^{2}) is water. The city officially annexed an urban growth area in June 2026. The annexation, which contained several parcels including a large section south of Chehalis near Jackson Highway, increased the size of the city limit by 3,857 acres (1,561 ha).

The city rests in a valley bordered by foothills of the Cascade Range to the east and the Willapa Hills to the west. Chehalis straddles Interstate 5 at a point almost exactly halfway between Seattle, Washington and Portland, Oregon. Chehalis is located north of the community of Newaukum and the city of Napavine. The communities of Littell and Adna are situated to the west.

The historic downtown and most of the city's amenities lie on the east side of the freeway, nestled at the base of a small range of forested hills. On the west side of the freeway are parks, farms, a few subdivisions developed in the hills to the west, and a centralized shopping district, the Twin City Town Center. The Chehalis–Centralia Airport is located immediately west of the freeway towards the northern end of the city. From numerous vantage points in the city and the Willapa Hills, there are views of Boistfort Peak and the three major volcanic mountains of the Cascades, Mount Rainier, Mount Adams, and Mount St. Helens, depending on weather conditions.

The Chehalis River winds its way through the valley in which the city resides, and is joined by a tributary, the Newaukum River. This confluence of waters, along with the intersections of tributaries and railroads within Chehalis, helped the city become known as "The Maple Leaf City". Both the Chehalis and Newaukum rivers are prone to flooding during periods of abnormally heavy or persistent rain, and the lowlands from the freeway westward are particularly susceptible to inundation. Near the Port of Chehalis is Dillenbaugh Creek, a watershed encompassing over 17 square miles (44 km^{2}).

=== Climate ===
This region experiences warm and dry summers, with no average monthly temperatures above 71.6 °F (22.0 °C). According to the Köppen Climate Classification system, Chehalis has a warm-summer Mediterranean climate, abbreviated "Csb" on climate maps.

Climate data for Chehalis, Washington, 1991–2020 normals
Month	Jan	Feb	Mar	Apr	May	Jun	Jul	Aug	Sep	Oct	Nov	Dec	Year
Mean daily maximum °F (°C)	46.6 (8.1)	50.3 (10.2)	55.0 (12.8)	60.4 (15.8)	67.5 (19.7)	72.1 (22.3)	78.8 (26.0)	79.8 (26.6)	74.4 (23.6)	62.3 (16.8)	51.7 (10.9)	45.6 (7.6)	62.0 (16.7)
Daily mean °F (°C)	40.6 (4.8)	42.3 (5.7)	45.7 (7.6)	49.8 (9.9)	56.1 (13.4)	60.5 (15.8)	65.7 (18.7)	66.1 (18.9)	61.3 (16.3)	52.4 (11.3)	44.6 (7.0)	40.0 (4.4)	52.1 (11.2)
Mean daily minimum °F (°C)	34.7 (1.5)	34.3 (1.3)	36.5 (2.5)	40.9 (4.9)	44.6 (7.0)	48.9 (9.4)	52.5 (11.4)	52.4 (11.3)	48.2 (9.0)	42.5 (5.8)	37.5 (3.1)	34.3 (1.3)	42.3 (5.7)
Average precipitation inches (mm)	6.59 (167)	4.53 (115)	4.86 (123)	3.45 (88)	2.37 (60)	1.69 (43)	0.54 (14)	0.80 (20)	1.66 (42)	4.16 (106)	7.26 (184)	7.11 (181)	45.02 (1,143)
Average dew point °F (°C)	36.8 (2.7)	36.4 (2.4)	38.3 (3.5)	40.8 (4.9)	45.4 (7.4)	49.4 (9.7)	53.0 (11.7)	53.6 (12.0)	50.6 (10.3)	45.9 (7.7)	40.3 (4.6)	36.4 (2.4)	43.9 (6.6)
Source: PRISM

==== Weather events and records ====
The city was hit with 100 mph winds gusts during the Columbus Day storm of 1962. The highest temperature ever recorded in the city was 107.0 °F (41.7 °C) in July 2009. Chehalis matched that record high on June 28, 2021, while surpassing other daily and monthly heat records for the month during the 2021 Western North America heat wave.

== Demographics ==
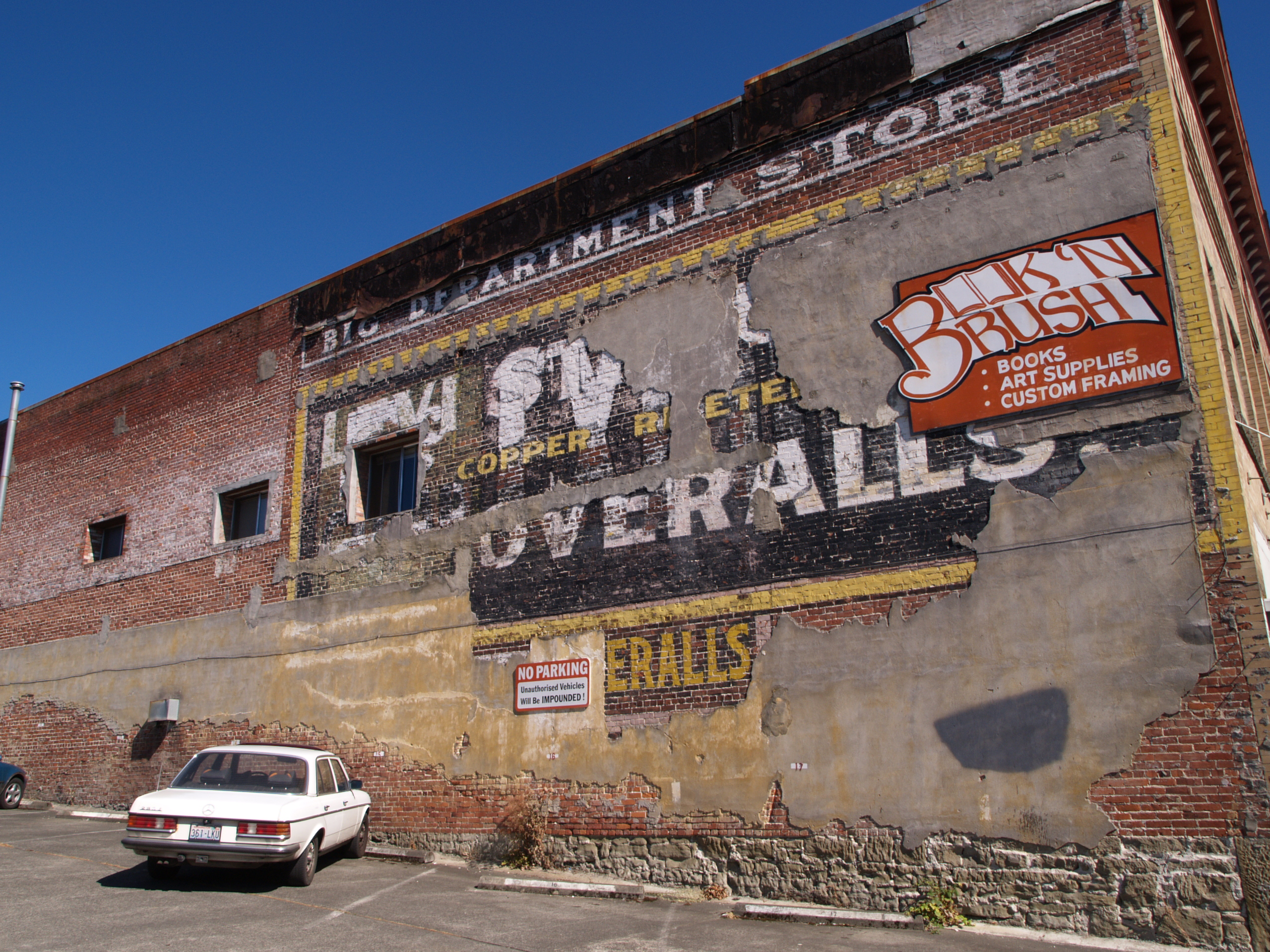
Ghost sign in Chehalis.

Historical population
Census	Pop.	Note	%±
1890	1,309		—
1900	1,775		35.6%
1910	4,507		153.9%
1920	4,558		1.1%
1930	4,907		7.7%
1940	4,857		−1.0%
1950	5,639		16.1%
1960	5,199		−7.8%
1970	5,727		10.2%
1980	6,100		6.5%
1990	6,527		7.0%
2000	7,057		8.1%
2010	7,259		2.9%
2020	7,439		2.5%
U.S. Decennial Census; 2020 Census

After the 2026 annexation of an urban growth area, the population of Chehalis was reported to have increased by approximately 2,000 people. An official census by the city of the annexed areas was planned for a later time.

=== 2020 census ===
As of the 2020 census, Chehalis had a population of 7,439 and a median age of 34.6 years. 24.4% of residents were under the age of 18 and 16.7% of residents were 65 years of age or older. For every 100 females there were 97.8 males, and for every 100 females age 18 and over there were 95.6 males age 18 and over.

97.7% of residents lived in urban areas, while 2.3% lived in rural areas.

There were 2,924 households in Chehalis, of which 31.9% had children under the age of 18 living in them. Of all households, 36.7% were married-couple households, 20.0% were households with a male householder and no spouse or partner present, and 33.5% were households with a female householder and no spouse or partner present. About 33.8% of all households were made up of individuals and 18.2% had someone living alone who was 65 years of age or older.

There were 3,139 housing units, of which 6.8% were vacant. The homeowner vacancy rate was 2.1% and the rental vacancy rate was 5.4%.

Racial composition as of the 2020 census
Race	Number	Percent
White	5,900	79.3%
Black or African American	127	1.7%
American Indian and Alaska Native	109	1.5%
Asian	90	1.2%
Native Hawaiian and Other Pacific Islander	21	0.3%
Some other race	490	6.6%
Two or more races	702	9.4%
Hispanic or Latino (of any race)	989	13.3%

=== 2010 census ===
As of the 2010 census, there were 7,259 people, 2,868 households, and 1,655 families residing in the city. The population density was 1,312.7 inhabitants per square mile (506.8/km^{2}). There were 3,131 housing units at an average density of 566.2 per square mile (218.6/km^{2}). The racial makeup of the city was 87.0% White, 1.7% African American, 1.3% Native American, 1.3% Asian, 0.2% Pacific Islander, 5.7% from other races, and 2.8% from two or more races. Hispanic or Latino of any race were 11.6% of the population.

There were 2,868 households, of which 31.1% had children under the age of 18 living with them, 36.9% were married couples living together, 14.9% had a female householder with no husband present, 6.0% had a male householder with no wife present, and 42.3% were non-families. 35.3% of all households were made up of individuals, and 16.8% had someone living alone who was 65 years of age or older. The average household size was 2.36 and the average family size was 3.02.

The median age in the city was 33.5 years. 24.5% of residents were under the age of 18; 12.5% were between the ages of 18 and 24; 25.9% were from 25 to 44; 22.6% were from 45 to 64; and 14.4% were 65 years of age or older. The gender makeup of the city was 50.2% male and 49.8% female.

=== Homelessness ===
The Point In Time Count (PTC) is a county census that is required by law to count the number of the population experiencing homelessness. Mandated by the United States Department of Housing and Urban Development (HUD) since 2003, the annual PTC tracks the number of individuals and families experiencing homelessness on a specified date and is usually held in January. It is organized locally with data transmitted to state and federal agencies. Students and children under the age of 18 who are described as, "in an overnight accommodation insecure situation", are not officially recorded as part of the PTC. However, the city of Chehalis had a count in 2017 reporting 130 students, and an incomplete count the following year of 136, who met the qualifications to be listed as homeless.

== Economy ==
=== Economic history ===
An early economic factor in Chehalis at the turn of the 20th century was coal production. Several mining companies were organized, including the Chehalis Coal Company, which was formed under state senator, James E. Leonard. The company, by 1915, produced up to 100 metric tons (100 t) of high lignite coal per day.

After the loss of a large pharmaceutical plant in 1952, the Chehalis community organized a group named "Adventure in Cooperation" which led to the beginnings of a commission that created the Chehalis Industrial Park later that decade. The economic area began when a new rail line, built by a group of local volunteers known as the "Gandy Dancers", was connected to the grounds. The industrial park, located south of the city district near the interstate, leases land that it purchases to corporations and businesses. The first tenant was a $1.0 million Goodyear Tire plant that opened in 1957.

The Port of Chehalis was officially established in September 1986 and was one of the last ports created in the state. The port was enacted by a public vote in Lewis County, which also developed a port district in the city. The agency oversees the Chehalis Industrial Park and the port is part of the South Puget Sound Foreign Trade Zone.

Food processing, which included canned or frozen items, has been a long-term economic sector of Chehalis, expanding in importance during the 1950s after the construction of U.S. Route 12 and Interstate 5.

Callison's, formally known as I.P. Callison's & Sons, was founded in the city in 1903. The company originally processed cascara bark, used as a laxative, and shipped a variety of flora for use in flower arrangements. Callison's expanded to produce peppermint in the 1940s, spearmint in 1952, and eventually essential oils, including the production of foxglove for medicinal use. The company headquarters and exporting components were moved to Lacey but the manufacturing plant remains in Chehalis. The company produces mint used in the production of candies at Chehalis Mints, a local confectioner that began in 1994.

The Lewis County Mall, situated south of the Lewis County Fairgrounds, was built in 1972. The mall was home to national chains and major retailers but in 1999, JCPenney departed the venue and other businesses followed soon thereafter due in part to the growth of other shopping centers in the local area. Sears was the last nationwide company to leave. In the 2000s, the 10-screen Midway Cinema was established in the building. As of 2023, the mall is home to smaller, regional businesses and plans include a renovation of the center for storage, apartment buildings, and restaurants.

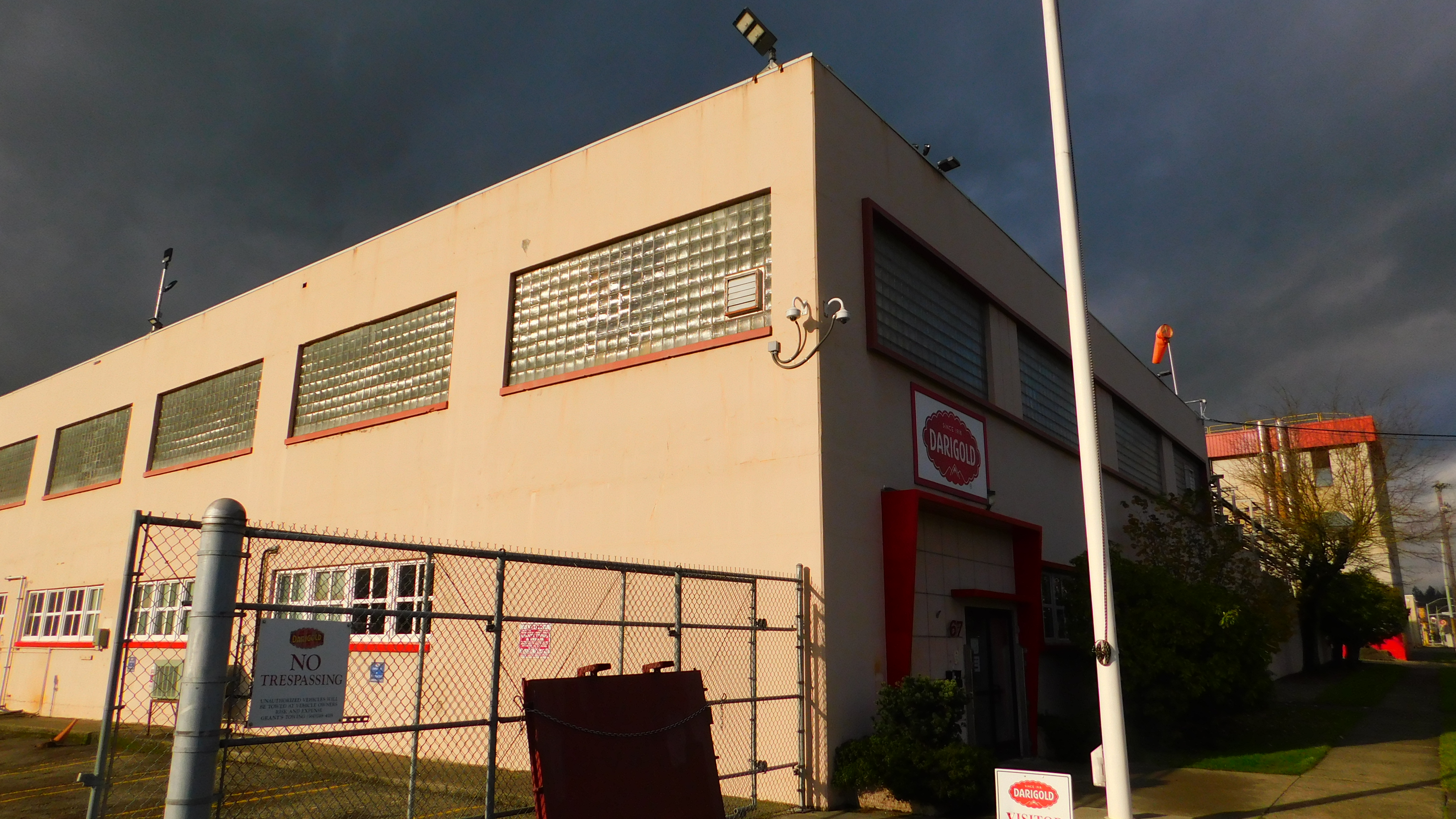
Darigold plant, 2025

Darigold opened a plant in Chehalis in 1975. In 2025, the company announced that the plant, with 55 full-time employees, was to close by the end of the year. Operations were to shift to a new facility located in Pasco. Darigold was expected to receive a $1.3 million tax refund after Lewis County and the city attempted to keep the company from leaving, agreeing to reduce the taxable value of the plant's site by approximately $70 million; the agreement was backdated to 2022, further increasing the valuation of a tax refund to the company. The financial loss was to be split between the state, county, and the city of Chehalis. Tax districts in Chehalis were also to be responsible for large portions of the refund, such as over $500,000 of lost annual revenue for the Chehalis School District. The Chehalis water department was estimated to lose over $300,000 in revenue as the plant was considered a large user of the city's water supply and wastewater infrastructure.

Timber, once an important economic component of the city, began increasing in the 2000s and the city became a warehousing center due to its access to the interstate and its location between Portland and Seattle. Beginning in the 2010s, the city embarked on increasing its economic diversity by creating an auto row for passenger vehicle dealerships at the Twin City Town Center district. Due in part to renovations of the Recreation Park Complex, and a subsequent growth in attendance for sports events, the community entered a growth phase in the hospitality industry.

=== Employment ===
Based on estimates included in the city's 2022 comprehensive plan, the unemployment rate in Chehalis was reported to be 7.1%. Household income averaged over $61,000 and the city held 6,908 jobs. Commuters, or non-residents of Chehalis, accounted for over 6,200 of the positions.

== Arts and culture ==
=== Art ===
Based on a plan approved by the city council in 2009, the Chehalis Community Renaissance Team (CCRT) (Note: The Chehalis Community Renaissance Team changed its name to "Experience Chehalis" in 2022.) was formed and implemented artistic improvements as part of long term revitalization project for downtown Chehalis. With funds provided by CCRT via community donations and various city, county, and state programs, local artists and business owners have produced artworks on utility boxes, trash can lids, and benches, along with additional murals and building façade renovations in the downtown and surrounding business districts.

A rainbow painted fence, known as the Chehalis Friendship Fence, is located in the city's Pennsylvania-Westside district near Westside Park. It was first created in 2020 and is a show of support of LGBTQ+ people and their rights.

Sculptures in public areas in Chehalis (Note: As of 2026, nine public sculptures in Chehalis have been donated by local Chehalis families or residents.) include The Guardian, a bronze work situated at the Lewis County Law and Justice Center. Created to honor local police officers who lost their lives in the line of duty, the artwork depicts a little girl along with an officer and a police dog. Four statues, portraying young children in various states of play, are located at the Recreation Park Complex. A bronze sculpture of a little girl sitting on a bench reading a book is located at the Vernetta Smith Timberland Library. The book was stolen but replaced in 2021. A bronze artwork, Monumental Boy and Girl on Globe, was installed at the elementary school grounds in 2026.

A sculpture containing multiple basalt columns is located at a commercial development near the I-5 exchange on Main Street known as Liberty Plaza. Created to honor American military veterans, the piece is part of a fountain. The 29,000 lb (13,000 kg) artwork was dedicated in 2009 and features a column standing 25 feet (7.6 m) in height, at the time thought to be the tallest such type in the world.

Chehalis is part of the ARTrails of Southwest Washington initiative. The cooperative, begun in 2003, showcases local artists, art studios and galleries throughout the region, and holds an annual autumnal studio tour that incorporates events in smaller towns within Lewis County. The Lewis County Historical Museum has hosted, since 2015, a permanent ARTrails gallery.

=== Charitable groups ===
Among the earliest women's groups in Washington state, the St. Helen's Club of Chehalis was founded on February 5, 1895. The literary organization, a member of the General Federation of Women's Clubs (GFWC) since 1896, has advocated for the importance of "literature, arts, science and vital issues of the day", a motto stretching back to the founding days of the club. The St. Helen's Club has invested in lobbying efforts focusing on issues of betterment for the state but mainly provides scholarships for high school and college women, including foreign-born students, attending colleges in the state. During the group's history, the women organized petitions in the early 1900s to demand clean streets and organized livestock drives within Chehalis, opened a women's rest stop in downtown, and planted what was referred to as "a mile of trees" at the fairgrounds. The group led restoration endeavors of the John R. Jackson House at the Jackson House State Park Heritage Site in 1915. As part of a state-wide GFWC initiative, the St. Helen's Club helped to raise funds to purchase land for the Federation Forest State Park near Enumclaw, Washington during the late 1920s.

=== Cuisine ===
In 2021, two restaurants in the city, Once Upon A Thyme, a luncheon diner, and Mackinaw's, which caters to fine dining, were featured in back-to-back episodes of the television show, Diners, Drive-Ins and Dives.

Mackinaw's, which was located at the Hotel Washington, was subjected to fines, loss of a liquor license, and eventual closure for failing to adhere to COVID-19 protocols for restaurants. Another restaurant, Spiffy's, continued indoor dining in 2020 during early lockdown laws amid the COVID-19 pandemic. The establishment was levied with $400,000 in fines and the restaurant, which existed for 50 years, shut down the following year.

=== Festivals and events ===
The city hosts the Chehalis Farmers Market between June and October in the historic downtown core on Boistfort Street. Held every year since 2005, the market is part of a larger Lewis County farmers market initiative. It is opened on Tuesday afternoons with a once-a-month Saturday opening begun during the 20th anniversary year of the market. As of 2024, the Chehalis Farmers Market is the only such type within a 20-mile (32 km) radius. Locally grown fruits and vegetables, as well as prepared food and art wares from the area, are often the leading focus of the market. The history of farmers markets in the city date to 1928, when the community began its first public market at the Chehalis municipal auditorium; the market shifted to Boistfort Street later that year due to lack of shoppers.

An annual, multi-day "ChehalisFest" is usually held at the end of July. Once titled, "Krazy Days", the early festival included a "saucer drop" of candy and gift-filled cardboard flying saucers that celebrated the 1947 flying disc craze. The event is hosted by Experience Chehalis (previously the Chehalis Community Renaissance Team), and is centrally located in the historic downtown district but expands to local tourist locations, including the Chehalis-Centralia Airport and Veterans Memorial Museum. Food, music, child activities, art walks, sidewalk sales, and car shows are often the highlights of the festivities.

A mid-summer Music in the Park free concert series takes place annually at Recreation Park. The event is typically held on three consecutive Fridays, with a different performer each evening. Based on local music demographics, country singers and cover bands often headline the series.

Chehalis borders the Southwest Washington Fairgrounds, which hosts an annual state fair, usually in August. The Lewis County Fair first took place in the city in 1891 and continued to do so until 1909 when the fairgrounds began hosting the event after the site was constructed.

In commemoration of the Kenneth Arnold UFO sighting and the city's connection to the event, the downtown district hosts the "Chehalis Flying Saucer Party" which first began in 2019. The festival revived the Krazy Day's tradition of the "saucer drop" and is usually a two-day, September celebration. It includes symposiums, a parade, musical performances, and UFO-themed activities in the city, with several exhibits about the sighting displayed at the Lewis County Historical Museum. In 2023, a short film competition, the "Northwest Flying Saucer Film Fest", was introduced to the event.

Chehalis's Santa Parade takes place in early December. A theme is chosen every year and local residents are selected as grand marshals as recognition for their community service. The route courses through the historic downtown district with floats and school marching bands highlighting the event. Held almost continuously since the 1940s, the parade celebrated its 75th year in 2025.

=== Historic buildings and sites ===
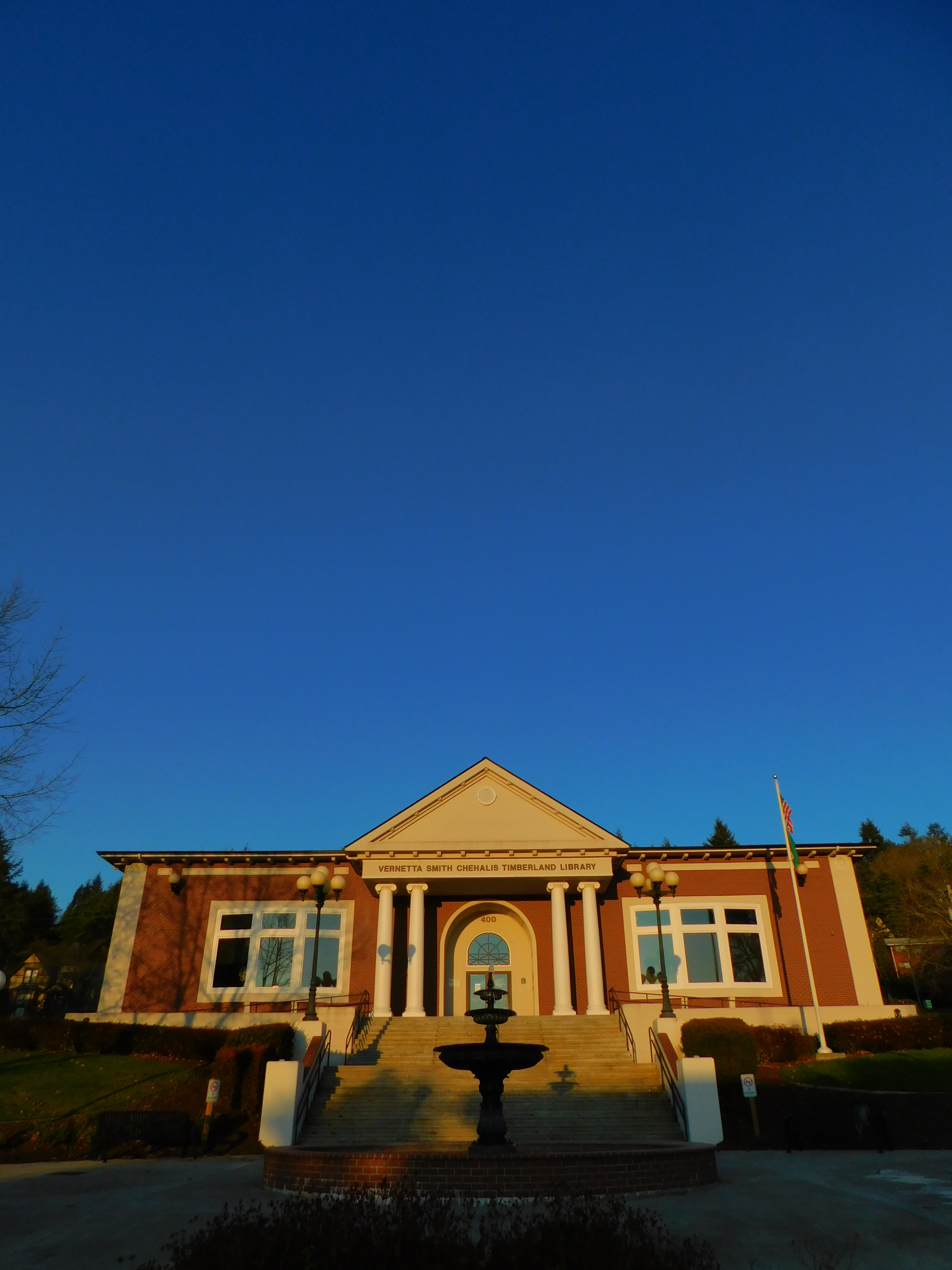
Vernetta Smith Timberland Library

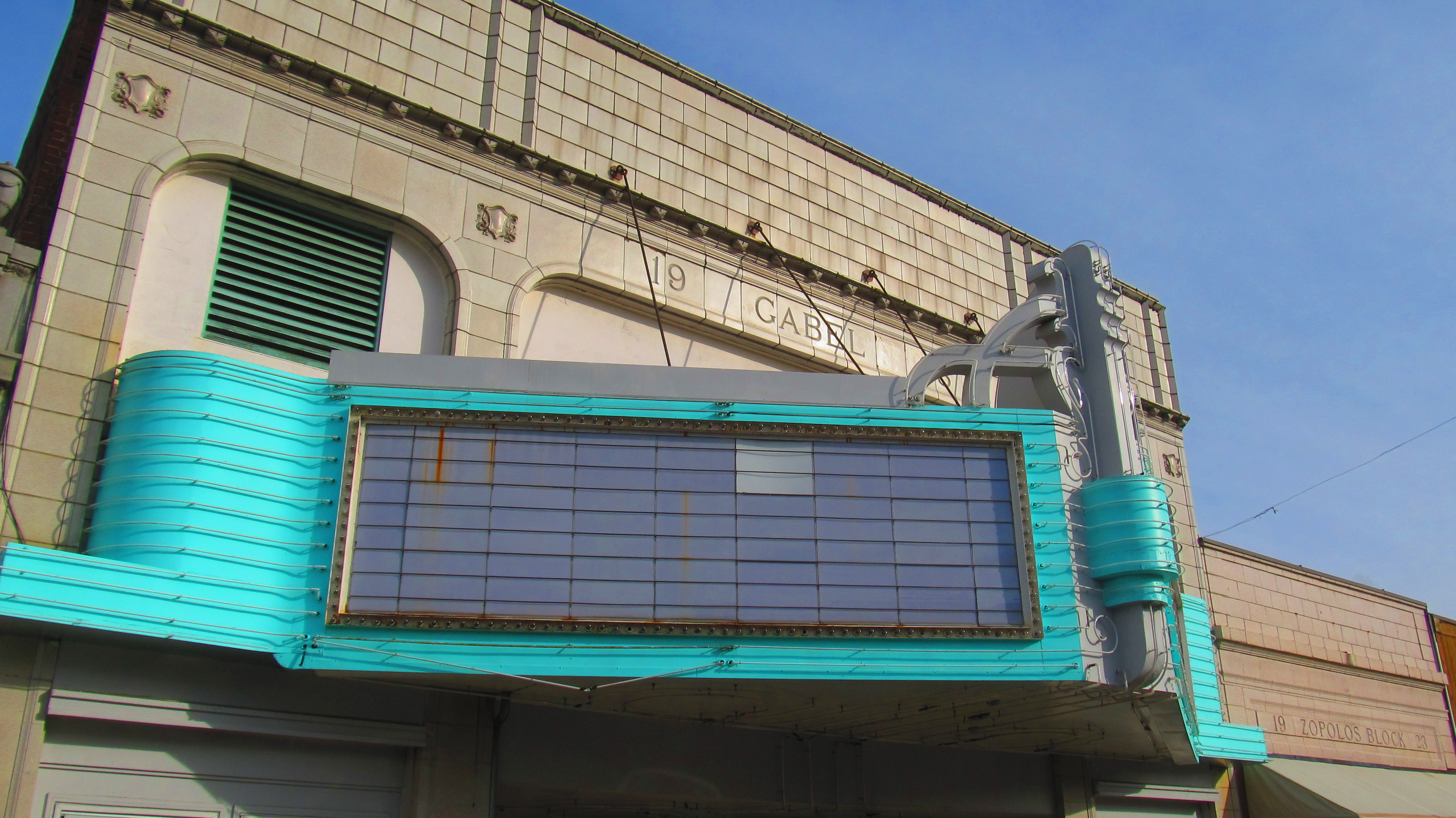
The Chehalis Theater

The city began a historical commission in the 1980s to honor and recognize buildings in Chehalis for their historical importance as well as preservation efforts. Given the moniker, the Chehalis Historic Preservation Commission, the committee's largest listing was in 2005 with 37 homes recognized; all were located in NRHP districts in the community. Each home or building is given a plaque that lists the original construction date, and may contain dates and names regarding conservation efforts. The commission, in the mid-2000s, was responsible for the beginnings of restoration efforts in the downtown district, specifically programs to improve and revitalize building façades.

The Chehalis Downtown Historic District was honored with placement on the National Register of Historic Places (NRHP) in 1997, notably for its Colonial Revival architecture. Historical buildings in the district include the NRHP-listed St. Helens Hotel and the Chehalis Theater, built in 1923 and originally known as the Pix Theater when it opened in 1938.

Two other NRHP district locations registered within Chehalis include the Hillside Historic District, which is home to the NRHP-designated Troop 373 and 7373 Scout Lodge, and the Pennsylvania Avenue-West Side Historic District. Other NRHP-listed buildings in the city include the Cascade School, Chehalis Post Office, the Lewis County Courthouse, and the county museum once known as the Burlington Northern Depot. The homes of O.B. McFadden, and O.K. Palmer are also listed with the NRHP.

Across from the courthouse sits the Judge Seymour White House, a Victorian house built in 1904 that was planned for demolition in 1986 after it was deemed a public nuisance. A public outcry saved the home. Given the nickname, "House of Ill Repute", it once was used as a brothel. The 1889 Hotel Washington is situated in the downtown district and was restored by a local family in 1997 following a destructive fire. It once hosted a movie house and vaudeville theater, known as the Dream Theater, and was home to the Vintage Motorcycle Museum.

Chehalis is home to several barns listed on the Washington State Heritage Barn Register. Registered buildings include the Henry and Flossie Lucas Barn, built c.1912, and the Rosecrest Farm, erected in 1914. Other barns include the Homestead Farm, established in 1915, the Chehalis River Hatchery, constructed in 1918, and the Hamilton-Gleason Barn built in 1929. The oldest barns include Gregory Farms, built in 1894, and the VT Farm, constructed in 1900.

To commemorate the 100th anniversary of Ezra Meeker's journey on the Oregon Trail, the city, by way of the Lewis County Historical Society, installed an historical marker at city hall. As part of a promise from towns along Meeker's trip to erect markers to honor the trail, Chehalis was one of the last areas to fulfill the obligation. Another marker was subsequently placed at Claquato Church in the nearby neighborhood of Claquato, the oldest continuously used church in Washington state.

The Vernetta Smith Chehalis Timberland Library, built in 2008 as a replacement of the city's 1910 Carnegie library, is operated by the Timberland Regional Library and named in honor of the mother of former Chehalis resident, Orin Smith.

=== Tourism ===
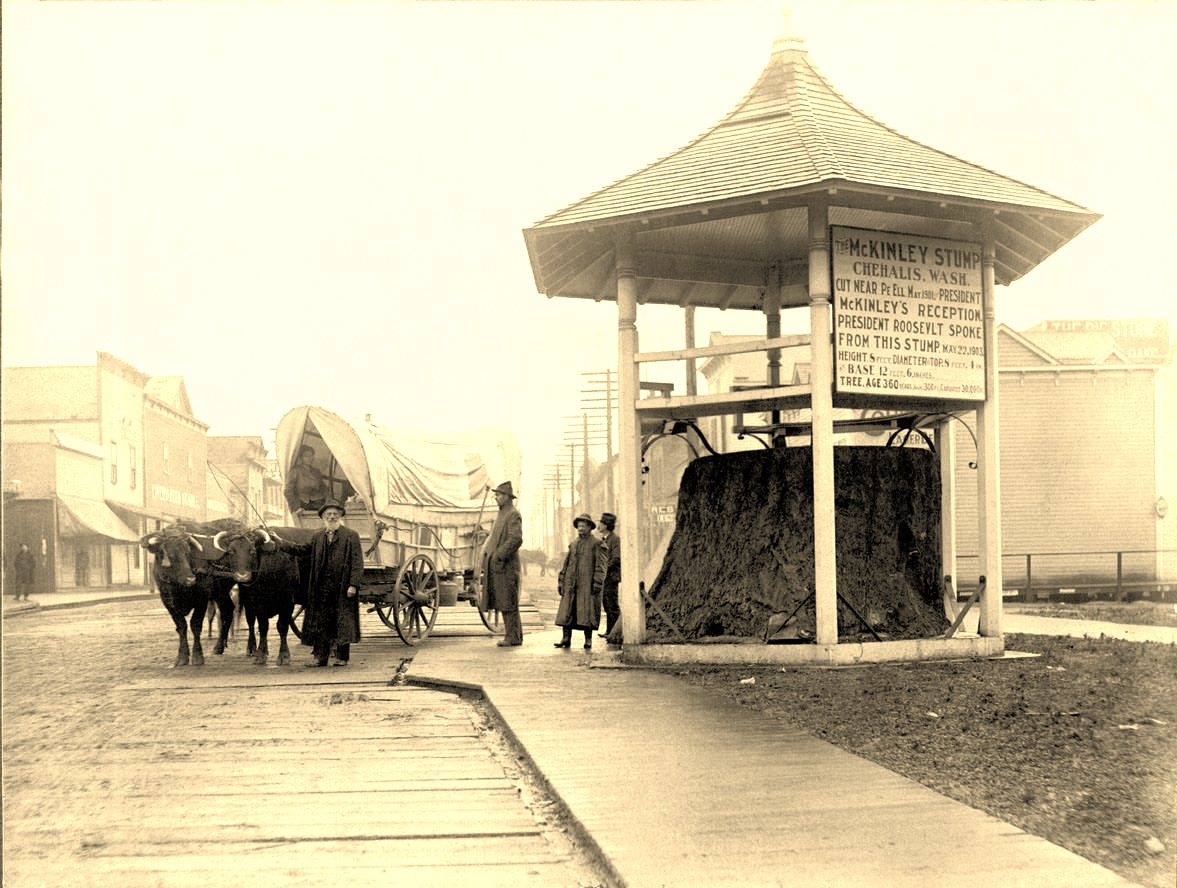
McKinley Stump, with Ezra Meeker

Chehalis is home to the Veterans Memorial Museum since it opened in 2005. The museum contains a 9,000-square-foot (840 m^{2}) gallery and visitors can participate in direct interactions with visiting United States war veterans. The museum's grounds exhibit several military aircraft and vehicles.

The Chehalis-Centralia Railroad & Museum is located south of the veterans museum and hosts the Chehalis–Centralia Railroad, a heritage railroad which offers various passenger train rides that traverse through the Twin City corridor and the Chehalis River Valley. The train, known as the Cowlitz, Chehalis and Cascade Railway 15, was once on display at Recreation Park and was restored in the mid-1980s.

A swap meet mall, Yard Birds, is a local landmark known for its large, metal and wood sculpture of a black bird. The mall was permanently closed in 2022 and threatened to be condemned due to code compliance and safety issues but the order was lifted at the end of the year. As of 2023, the attraction still remains.

Located at the Lewis County Historical Museum is the McKinley Stump, a replica of an 8 foot (2.4 metres) tall remnant of a Douglas fir cut down in 1901 near Pe Ell. It was meant to be used as a speech pedestal for President William McKinley, but the event was cancelled. Theodore Roosevelt used it two years later and William H. Taft employed the stump as a podium in 1907. The stump, demolished after excessive rot and an infestation of carpenter ants, was replaced with a replica stump which was installed at the museum in 2008.

== Sports ==
Bicycling is a popular sport in Chehalis, hosting along with other towns on the State Route 6 corridor an annual "Ride The Willapa" bike ride that raises money for the Willapa Hills Trail. The Lewis County Historic Bike Ride, an annual fundraising event since the early 1990s, features ride options that vary from easy to advanced, and traverses through the city. The bike ride is used by Seattle to Portland Bicycle Classic (STP) participants as a practice run. Chehalis is included as part of the route for the STP which traverses around the airport and winds through downtown and connected neighborhood districts. Riders of the STP will overnight in the city as an overflow option to Centralia. Klein Bicycle Corporation, connected to the city during its early years of production, sponsored the three-stage Klein Classic in the 1990s. A bicycle event for local residents, known as the Centralia to Chehalis Bike Ride, was held continuously from the late 20th century into the 3rd millennium. The "C to C" route meandered from George Washington Park in Centralia, to around the airport, and finishing at Recreation Park after traversing through several residential neighborhoods.

Chehalis's Millet Field used to host minor league baseball, including such teams as the Gophers, Proteges, and Farmers; the 1912 Chehalis Farmer's team was awarded the league championship. The field accommodated semi-pro baseball and football from the turn of the 20th century into the 1970s. Several Negro League games were played in the town.

The city was granted an expansion team by the American Basketball Association for the 2008–2009 season. Known as the Washington Raptors, the organization merged with the Fresno Rebels by the middle of the first season; the team became based out of California. The Chehalis team originally participated in the International Basketball League by 2006 and were known as the Lewis County Raptors.

Two parks within the city limits, Recreation and Stan Hedwall Parks, are used for a variety of W.F. West High School sports competitions and for tournaments involving high schools within Lewis County. The high school hosted a preseason exhibition game between the Portland Trail Blazers and the Seattle SuperSonics in 1970, marking the beginning of the I-5 Rivalry.

== Parks and recreation ==
The city has several parks, many of which are based on land donated by Chehalis residents. Money raised to build, maintain, or upgrade the area's park system has long been done by community fundraising efforts.

The largest park, the Recreation Park Complex, is located in Chehalis's South Market district and contains four separate units. The Gail and Carolyn Shaw Aquatics Center' opened in August 2014 and it replaced the original 1959 Chehalis Community Pool. The Chet and Henrietta Rhodes Spray Park, completed in 2007, adjoins the aquatic center, geared mostly for young children and people with disabilities. Recreation Park is the largest of the area, and is home to four softball and youth baseball fields, picnic areas, paved walking paths, and a community center and kitchen. It was recently rebuilt in 2020 along with the abutting Penny Playground, a fenced play area geared for children. The playground's name comes from the donation drives used to help fund the building of the park in 1993.

Two additional parks are furnished for athletics and organized sports. Stan Hedwall Park straddles the Newaukum River with 200 acres of ball fields, RV parking, trails, and open and forested areas. Millett Field was formerly home to a semi-pro baseball team in the early 20th century, and regularly used for sports since it opened in 1898 and developed in 1908. A basketball court and a playground area, both created by local charitable acts in the early 2000s, are the focus of the 3-acre (1.2 ha) park.

Several parks organized and built for leisure and family activities are dispersed within the city limits. Westside Park, located in the Pennsylvania Avenue-West Side Historic District, contains basketball courts, a playground, and picnic areas. Lintott-Alexander Park, located on land that was donated in the early 20th century by a Chehalis family, is a 6-acre (2.4 ha) park that was restored after a monetary contribution from a former community resident in 2004. A pair of the oldest recreational areas in the city, John Dobson and McFadden Parks, are a combined 56-acre (23 ha) and are located in the Hillside District on Park Hill. A shared trail, the Dobson-McFadden, bridges the parks and leads to open views to much of Chehalis, including downtown, and the Newaukum River valley.

Several Chehalis parks contain walking paths and trails but there are three separate trails of note. The Airport Levee Trail is a mixed paved-gravel trail that loops for up to 3.5 miles (5.6 km) and is situated between farm land and the Chehalis-Centralia Airport. It connects with the nearby Airport Road Trail, a paved, mixed-use trail that parallels Interstate 5 for 2.0 miles (3.2 km); it is part of long-term plan to link the recreational areas between the Twin Cities. The Willapa Hills Trail stretches 56.0 miles (90.1 km) from Chehalis to South Bend, Washington. Built over a late 19th century railroad, it is now a mix of paving and compact gravel and is open to hikers, bicyclists, and horse riding.

== Environment and ecology ==
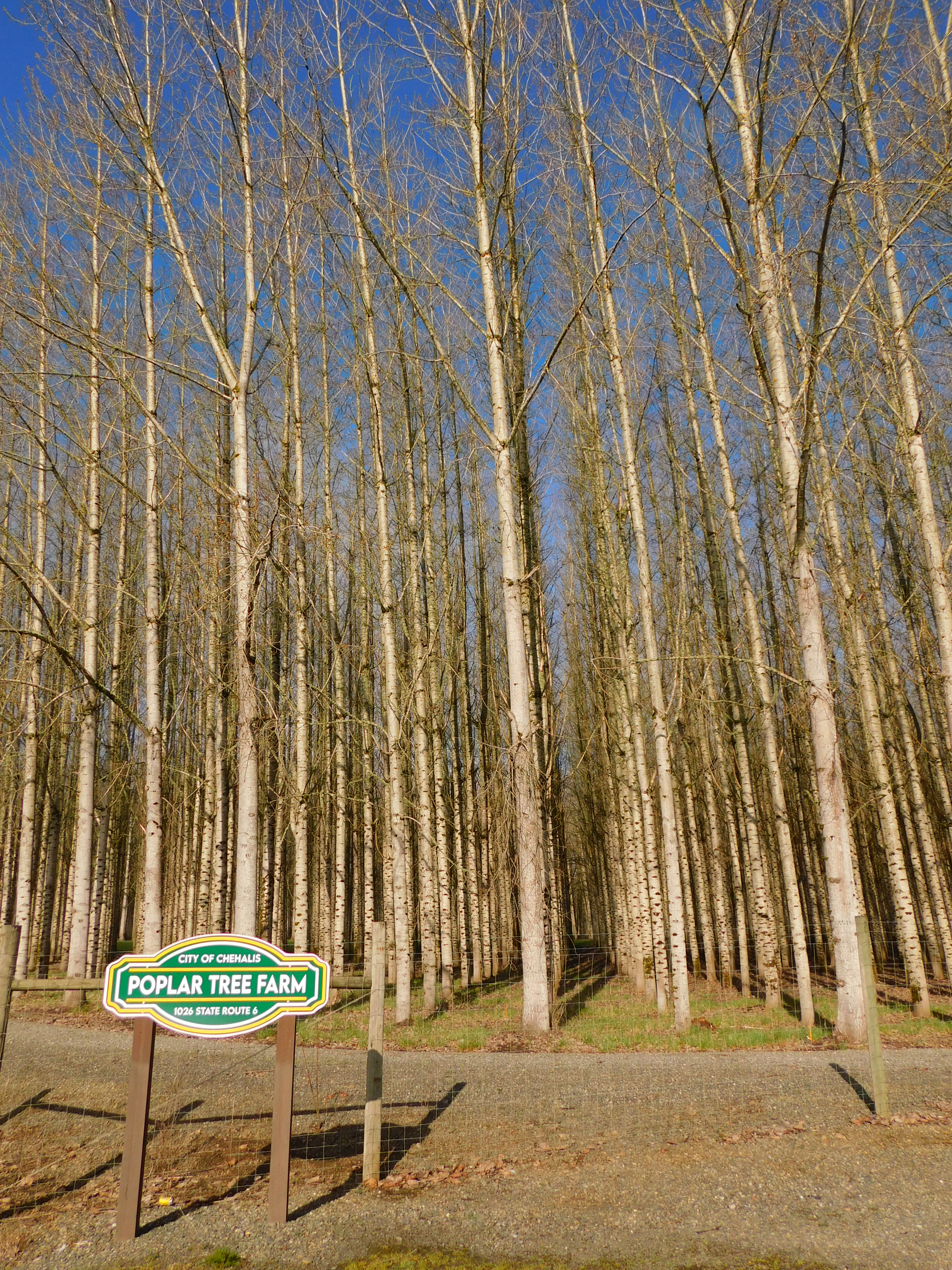
Chehalis Poplar Tree Farm, 2025

The city owns and operates the Chehalis Poplar Tree Farm. Located east of Claquato on State Route 6, the 11-unit, 250-acre (100 ha) site grows nine hybrid varieties of poplar. The farm is part of Chehalis' water treatment program where wastewater is used to hydrate the poplar fields.

The area is populated by cascara, defined as a bush or tree depending on its size. The main harvesting of the plant is for its bark, commonly used as a laxative. Origins of a fungal disease, known as dogwood anthracnose, was first recorded in approximately 1977 in Chehalis. The disease spread to the East Coast and Southeast regions of the United States.

The Chehalis River and Dillenbaugh Creek watersheds in the city are home to migrating coho salmon and the ecosystems support beaver and deer. A 66-acre (27 ha) wetland area was donated to Chehalis in 1994 by the owner of Yardbirds. Located at the northern city limit at Salzer Creek on National Avenue, Chehalis allows the parcel to be used as an improvement offset by businesses in exchange for companies building in other wetland areas in the community.

The city contains two Superfund sites. A major flood in 1986 led to a contamination cleanup at a closed industrial site, known as American Crossarm and Conduit, near Millett Field. Approximately 10,000 US gallons (38,000 L; 8,300 imp gal) of a mixture of creosote and diesel fuel, as well as cancer-causing chemicals such as dioxins and pentachlorophenol used in the treatment of lumber, spread into the surrounding neighborhoods as well as the Dillenbaugh Creek watershed. The $9.5 million hazardous cleanup was undertaken by the Environmental Protection Agency (EPA) and the area was listed in 1988 as a federal superfund site; the remediation was not completed until 1996. The Hamilton/Labree Roads Groundwater Contamination site is an ongoing remediation project. Split into two units, the more than 10-acre (4.0 ha) contaminated area is located 2 miles (3.2 km) south of the city at Berwick Creek. The concerns include the dumping of PERC and buried drums of other hazardous chemicals which has affected the soil and water system in the area. First noticed in 1993, an initial cleanup, referred to as "interim", began in 2020 and was completed in 2024. Continued monitoring of the site will evaluate if further mitigation will be required.

== Government and politics ==
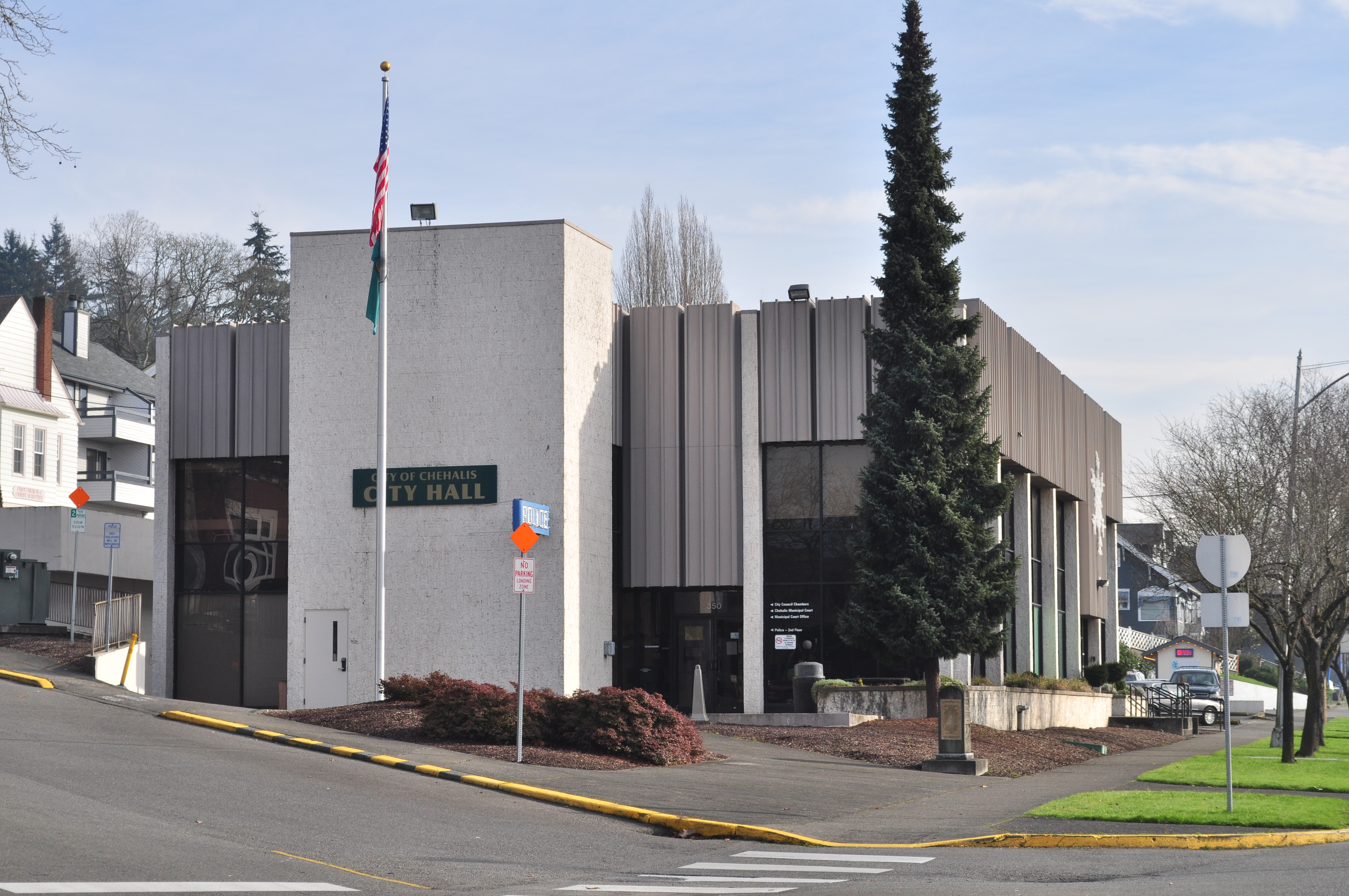
Chehalis City Hall

Chehalis has a council–manager system of government that consists of an elected city council and an appointed city manager. The city council has seven members, of which three come from at-large seats, and selects a ceremonial mayor from its members. As of 2025, the mayor is Tony Ketchum.

The council was formed in November 1975 after a city-wide vote to change from a three-person commission to a seven-member board. The inaugural council included the election of the first woman mayor of Chehalis, Viviane Roewe.

The city is located in District 1 of Lewis County and as of 2025, represented by County Commissioner Sean Swope.

=== Politics ===
Presidential Elections Results (Note: The Presidential Election Results table includes voting precincts within the Chehalis city limits and may not include other nearby or surrounding districts such as Claquato or Logan.)
Year	Republican	Democratic	Third parties
2008	53.4% 1537	44.4% 1280	2.2% 63
2012	53.5% 1479	42.8% 1183	3.7% 102
2016	53.9% 1458	37.4% 1011	8.3% 260
2020	53.2% 1877	42.5% 1498	3.9% 139
2024	53.4% 1802	42.8% 1445	3.8% 129

Third parties receiving votes in the 2016 and 2020 elections were the Libertarian Party and Green Party. There were 15 votes for write-in candidates in both cycles and the 2016 election also included votes for the Constitution Party. In the 2024 election, there were 17 write-in votes cast and 50 votes were tallied for Robert F. Kennedy Jr..

=== Crime and criminal justice ===
The Green Hill School, the state's only maximum security penitentiary for juveniles, is located in the South Market district. Located next to the school is the Lewis County Juvenile Court. A small, attached jail is specifically used as a temporary incarceration site for arrested Lewis County youths awaiting trial. The city is also home to the Lewis County Jail, situated across from the Lewis County Courthouse in the government district.

== Education ==
The Chehalis School District (CSD) provides public education to Chehalis students from pre-kindergarten to 12th grade. Elementary students attend James W. Lintott Elementary from pre-kindergarten to 2nd grade, moving to Orin C. Smith Elementary to complete third to 5th grade. Chehalis Middle School, built in 1989, hosts grades 6th thru 8th. W.F. West High School, opened in 1951, provides a completion of primary education from 9th to 12th grades.

Both elementary schools were built concurrent in 2018 and fully opened in 2019. They replaced the previous primary schools of Cascade (built 1922), R.E.Bennet (opened in 1928), and Olympic (built 1960).

The city also provides schooling for rehabilitating juvenile males at Green Hill School, with options for students to obtain a high school or general equivalency diploma (GED), vocational training, and college prep courses, with additional opportunities to earn an associate or bachelor's degree via a joint partnership with Centralia College.

== Media ==
=== Film and television ===
Several movies have been filmed in and around Chehalis, including Captain Fantastic, and the independent film Maysville. Diverse documentaries filmed in the city include the environmental feature about the Chehalis river basin, Chehalis : A Watershed Moment, and the movie, Skinny and Fatty: The Story of Yard Birds, a reflection on a local market attraction.

=== Newspapers ===
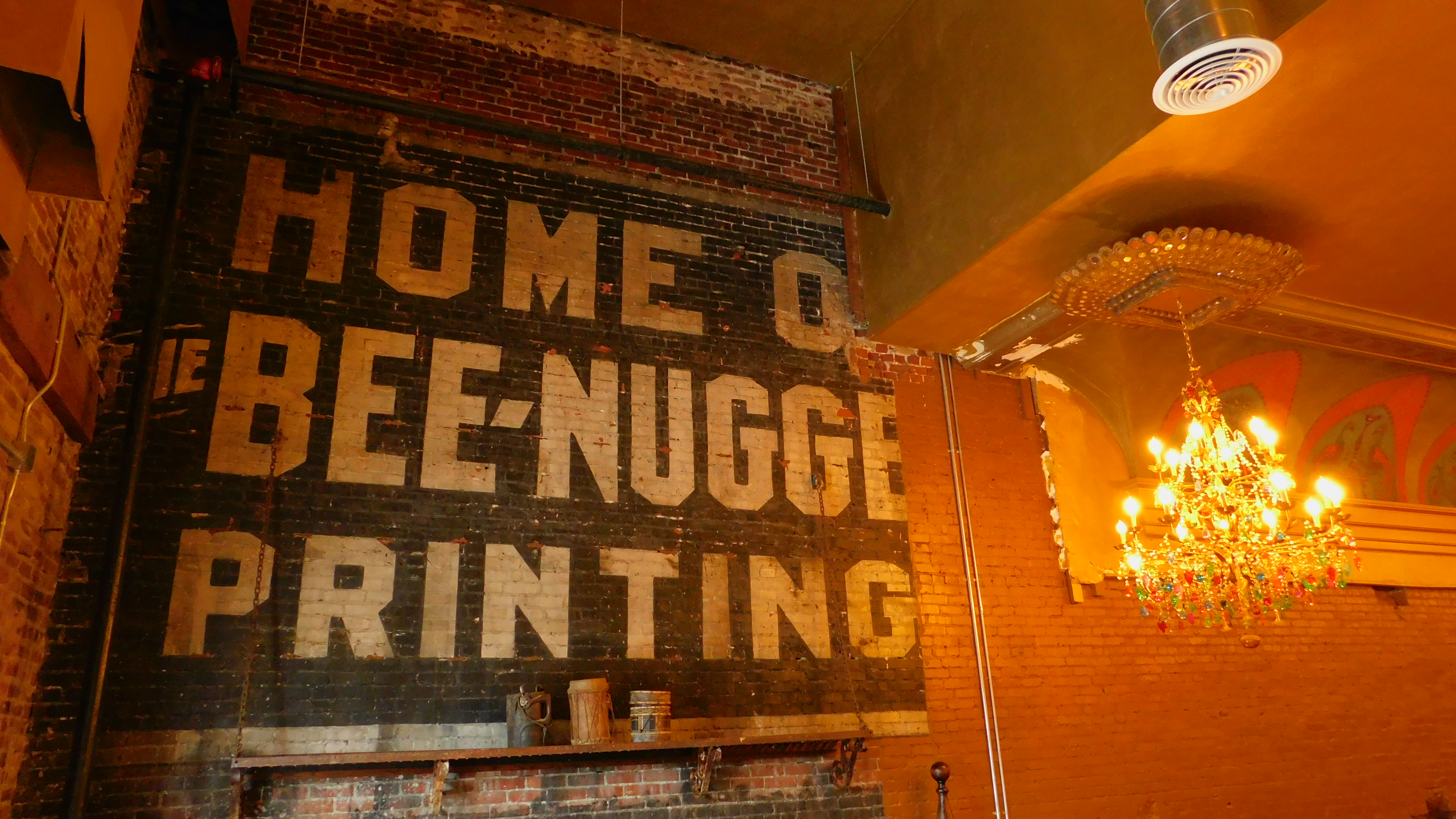
Ghost sign for The Chehalis Bee-Nugget, 2019

The earliest recorded newspaper published in Chehalis was The Lewis County Nugget in 1883. The following year, The Lewis County Bee was first ciruclated. Between 1887 and 1888, both publications dropped the county title and became The Chehalis Bee and The Chehalis Nugget. The city was also home to a third publication, The People's Advocate, beginning in 1892. The Bee and Nugget merged in 1898 to become The Chehalis Bee-Nugget.

The Advocate became The Lewis County Advocate in 1902. The Bee-Nugget merged with Advocate to become The Chehalis Advocate in 1938. The merger left Chehalis with one surviving news publication produced in the city. The Chehalis Advocate, due to a loss of ad revenue and rising costs, folded in 1962. A weekly newspaper known as The Weekly News, and then as The Chehalis Times, was begun in 1979 but folded two years later. Since then, Chehalis has been without a city-produced newspaper and local news reports for the residents of Chehalis are provided by The Chronicle, a weekly newspaper published in Centralia.

A ghost sign for The Chehalis Bee-Nugget was found in 2009, and subsequently preserved, during a renovation of Chehalis's historic St. Helens Theater.

=== Radio ===
The Chehalis area has two licensed FM radio stations, KACS - 90.5 FM, which broadcasts a Christian format, and KMNT - 104.3 FM, providing country music to the community. Additional stations include Centralia College owned KCED - 91.3 FM, which transmits Alternative programming, and the Adult contemporary music radio broadcaster KITI-FM - 95.1 FM, based in Winlock. Centralia based AM radio station, KELA 1470 is a mixed sports and talk broadcaster.

== Infrastructure ==
=== Flood control ===
Lewis County and various other regional governments, in association with environmental groups, scientists, and local citizens, organized a partnership in the early 2010s named the Chehalis Basin Strategy to propose and research a combination of plans along the Chehalis River to mitigate flooding and to restore aquatic habitat for local Chinook salmon. The proposal outlines several flood control reduction measures, with downstream levee improvements particularly at the Centralia-Chehalis Airport, and a flood retention dam in Pe Ell which is planned to limit catastrophic damage from 100-year floods within the Chehalis River Basin.

=== Healthcare ===
The first known hospital in the city was built in 1903 within the Pennsylvania Avenue-West Side Historic District. Four years later, the St. Helens Hospital was constructed as a site to treat elderly and poor citizens. The wood building was razed after the 1927 concrete build of a new and expanded St. Helens Hospital. The care center was expanded again in 1952 and a nursing home annex was added in 1964. Another expansion in 1970 included such additions as a surgery center and pharmacy but by the mid-1970s, the hospital was reported as struggling financially. The site became of use as a detox and addiction recovery center run by American Behavioral Health Systems.

Chehalis is served by Centralia's 128-bed, non-profit Providence Centralia Hospital for short-term acute care that also provides services for surgery, cancer, obstetrics, and is equipped with a 24-hour emergency room and an ICU. There are several clinics in Chehalis, including Providence Chehalis Family Medicine, Northwest Pediatric Care, and Chehalis Children's Clinic. Mental health services are provided by Cascade Mental Health Care.

The Lewis County Public Health & Social Services building is located in the government district of the city, north of the Lewis County Courthouse.

Military veterans were able to procure health services at the Lewis County Community-Based Outpatient Clinic located in the Lewis County Mall but the facilities were closed in 2021 due to patient expenses that were considered the highest in the nation for a Veteran's Administration (VA) clinic. Patients have since been directed to an Olympia VA clinic and additional local health services have been provided by a mobile medical unit overseen by the Seattle-based VA Puget Sound Health Care System.

=== Transportation ===
Chehalis is served by Interstate 5, the main north–south freeway in Western Washington, which connects the city to Seattle and Portland. The freeway also carries a section of U.S. Route 12, an east–west highway that continues to Aberdeen and across the Cascades to the Yakima River Valley and Tri-Cities. Chehalis is the location of the eastern cessation point of State Route 6, a highway that travels west to a junction with U.S. Route 101 in Raymond. The Chehalis terminus converts into West Main Street with access to the city through the government district.

Four other bridges provide direct access to the city district. Chamber of Commerce Way connects to the city shopping center and heads over a 1951 railroad overpass and to the original arterial highway before the interstate was built. The West Side Bridge (West Bridge) accommodates traffic into the Pennsylvania Avenue-West Side Historic District and a route towards downtown. An overpass, referred to as the 13th Street Bridge, provides a connection to the South Market district, Recreation Park, and the Green Hill School. The Labree Road Bridge, built in 2007, provides an access route for the Port of Chehalis.

Lewis County Transit provides public transit service to Chehalis and neighboring Centralia, with connections to other communities. Early 20th century public transportation for residents relied on a streetcar line operated by the local Twin City Railroad Company, which connected the city with neighboring Centralia. As the community began to favor travel by bus, the service was discontinued by 1929.

The Chehalis–Centralia Airport (CLS) is located within the city limits. The airport is a single runway, public use hub for air travel in Lewis County. First begun as a small airfield in 1927, it is bordered by the local shopping district and I-5 and is approximately one mile west of the Chehalis downtown district. It is the largest of the three airports within the county.

==== Railroads ====
The earliest connection for Chehalis to new railroads in the region was in 1873 when the first depot in the area was erected in Newaukum. A local resident paid a conductor to stop in Saundersville, eventually leading to the build of a warehouse depot in the town that became Chehalis. A standard train station was completed in 1883, replaced in 1912 by a depot that became the Lewis County Historical Society and Museum. Economic conditions improved drastically in the city, leading to a large build-up of the downtown core. Competing railroads, attempting to connect Chehalis to the Pacific coast, begin around 1890. A rail company, the Pacific, Chehalis & Eastern, operated a line to Sea Haven; funded by prominent residents, the venture failed by 1891. A freight railroad that led to South Bend was operated by the Northern Pacific Railway Company and became successful after full operations began in 1893. Passenger service began on the line and provided the city with an increase in local shopping. The passenger trains began to decrease during the Great Depression and ceased by 1954 due to competition with automobile travel.

Chehalis, in 1916, began being served by a short rail line operated by the Cowlitz, Chehalis, & Cascade Railroad. The line transported milk from local dairy farms to condensing plants in the city and provided lumber from surrounding timberlands to sawmills and woodworking producers in Chehalis.

Other railroads in the city include the Chehalis Western Railroad, a portion of which became part of the Chehalis–Centralia Railroad after the line was sold.

=== Utilities ===
==== Communications ====
The first telephone operations in Chehalis began in 1891 when the city was connected to the Sunset Telephone and Telegraph Company in Centralia. An official exchange began in 1893 and connection availability for the entirety of the community was completed in 1898, which included 35 total subscribers. The company, then serving approximately 1,000 customers in the Twin Cities, was renamed in 1916 to the Pacific Telephone and Telegraph Company. By the mid-1960s, the area was served by Pacific Northwest Bell and had a subscriber list of over 12,000 between Centralia and Chehalis.

==== Electricity ====
Lewis County PUD provides electricity within the city, 75% that is generated via hydroelectricity. Natural gas and infrastructure for residents and businesses within the city limits is provided by Puget Sound Energy.

==== Renewable energy ====
Chehalis received grants of $4.45 million in 2021 to build the first hydrogen fueling station in Washington state; it is to be initially overseen by Twin Transit. The site, scheduled for completion in mid-2023, is located in the southern portion of the city on Port of Chehalis property off I-5 and is planned to operate on 1 acre (0.40 ha) of the 8 acres (3.2 ha) plat and be capable for usage of up to 2 megawatts. The self-service facility will have two fuel pressure stations, light-duty and heavy duty, of 700 and 350-bar fuel pressure, respectively.

The city installed its first charging stations for electric vehicles in 2018 at a shopping center on city-owned land. The station originally had four stalls and was later expanded through legislation from the city government. Chehalis is part of a broader initiative to provide charging stations along the White Pass Scenic Byway.

==== Sanitation ====
As of 2023, Chehalis residents obtain garbage collection services, required by city ordinance, with Harold LeMay Enterprises.

==== Water ====
The City of Chehalis Water Division is responsible for clean drinking water, including water treatment and operations, and maintains reservoirs and tanks for a storage capacity of over 6.7 million gallons. The Chehalis Regional Water Reclamation Facility, constructed beginning in 2005, was completed in September 2007.

The primary source for water is the North Fork of the Newaukum River, which the city is allowed to draw, as of 2023, two-thousand acre feet per year (3.1 million gallons per day). The Chehalis River is a secondary source, with the city allowed to siphon 1 million gallons daily. Fluoridation of the water supply began in 1951.

In the 21st century, water-use efficiency programs, required by the Washington State Department of Health (DOH), reached a goal to reduce water use by 25,000 gallons daily and introduced an additional goal of a 3% reduction during summer. Based on a 2024 water system plan, also required by DOH, Chehalis oversees 577,000 feet (175,869.6 m) of water lines, supplying 5,800 US gallons (22,000 L; 4,800 imp gal) per minute to 3,800 connections. With new water lines built in the southern portion of the city limits in 2023 and 2024, the city has adequate water supply until 2040. As of 2024, the city's water treatment facilities, built in 1961, provide 4.8 million gallons of water per day and is expected to be of sufficient use until 2036.

== Sister city ==
Chehalis has been a sister city with Inasa, Shizuoka, Japan since 1990. It merged into the city of Hamamatsu, which continues the relationship.

Chehalis is considered a twin city with adjacent Centralia.

== Notable people ==
- Don G. Abel, Washington state supreme court justice
- Brad Baker, motorcyclist and 2013 AMA Grand National Championship winner
- Andrew Barkis, Washington state legislator
- Ernst Bechly, American surveyor and map maker
- Kay Bell, football player and professional wrestler
- Morgan Christen, United States federal appellate judge
- Arthur Cory, Washington state legislator
- Robert MacArthur Crawford, composer and musician
- Henry C. Davis, Washington state pioneer and businessman
- Richard DeBolt, member of Washington House of Representatives, 1997-2021
- Frank Everett, Washington state pioneer and businessman
- Judianne Fotheringill, 1963 and 1964 pair skating U.S. national champion
- Dave and Vean Gregg, professional baseball players
- Bill Markham, member of the Oregon House of Representatives
- Olive McKean, Bronze medalist swimmer at the 1936 Summer Olympics
- Seton I. Miller, Oscar winner in 1941 for Best Screenplay
- Nana Miyagi (Smith), professional ITF and WTA tennis player
- Catherine T. Montgomery, educator
- Ralph Rivers, first United States Representative from Alaska
- Wilma Rosbach, member of the Washington House of Representatives, 1979-1983
- Ross Shafer, comedian and host of Almost Live!
- Lewis D. Scherer, college football player and coach, early 20th century
- Elmer Schwartz, professional football player in the 1930s
- Mike Skinner, former stock car racing driver
- Orin Smith, former CEO of Starbucks
- Harry Hudson Swofford, Washington state legislator
- Warren A. Taylor, first Speaker of the Alaska House of Representatives
- Ralph Towner, acoustic guitarist
- Albert E. Tozier, founder of the Chehalis Nugget newspaper
- Harry R. Truman, 1980 Mt. St. Helens eruption folk hero
- William Muir Urquhart, Chehalis pioneer and businessman
- Thomas Westendorf, American songwriter, composer, and educator
