= Chehalis Poplar Tree Farm =

Tree farm in Chehalis, Washington

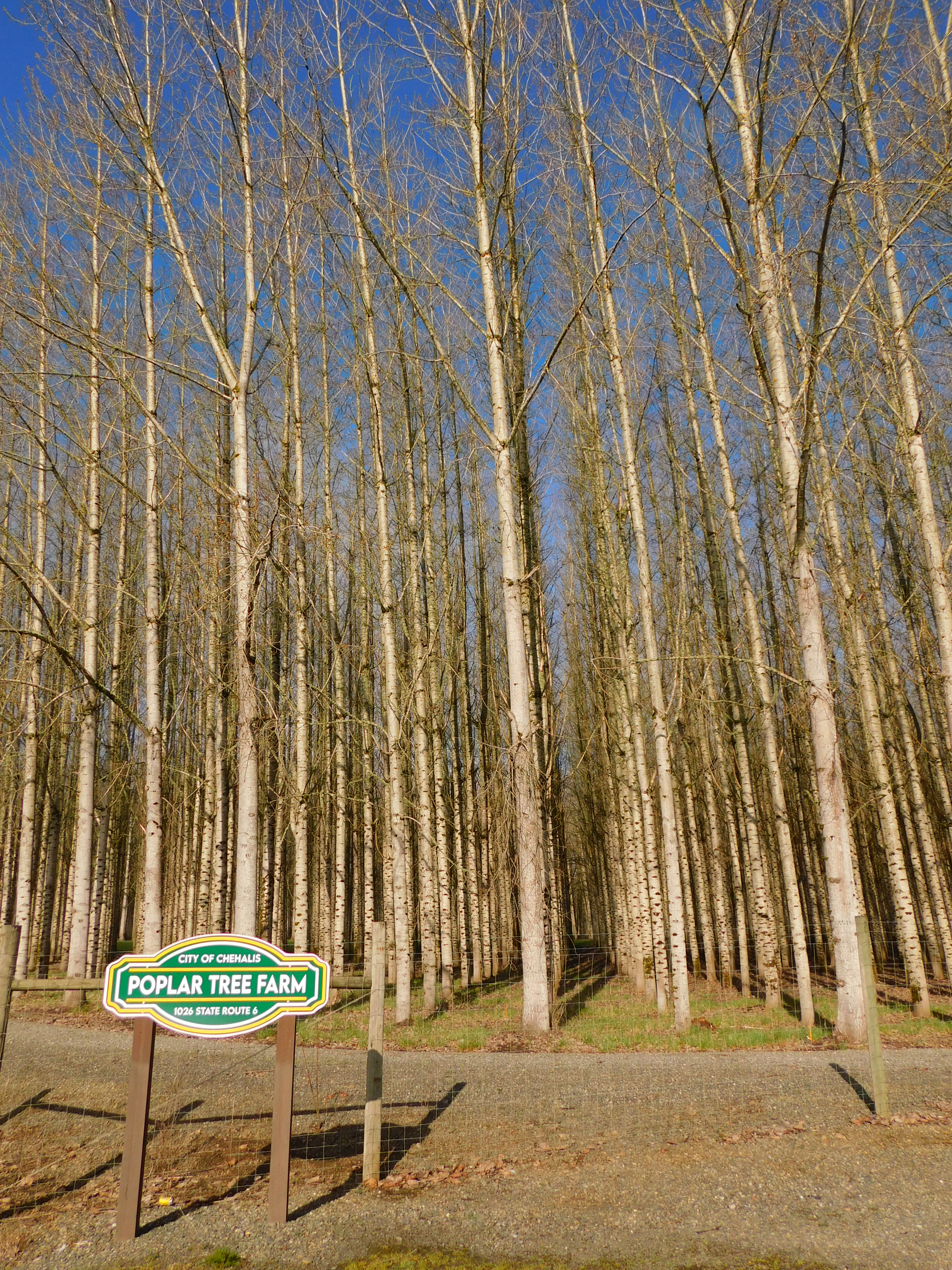
- Chehalis Poplar Tree Farm, 2025

- Location within Washington (state) Location within the United States
- Town/City: Chehalis, Washington
- Coordinates: 46°39′4″N 123°0′15.98″W
- Established: 2003
- Owner: City of Chehalis
- Area: 250 acres (100 ha)
- Produces: Poplar
- Status: Active
- Website: Chehalis Public Works Department - Poplar Tree Farm

The Chehalis Poplar Tree Farm, also previously known informally as the Chehalis Poplar Tree Plantation, is a 250-acre (100 ha) tree farm located west of Chehalis, Washington near Claquato off State Route 6.

The site is city-owned and poplar trees are grown and harvested at the farm. The grounds are hydrated from a nearby sewage plant on the Chehalis River as part of a wastewater treatment process for Chehalis and the surrounding area. The poplars are genetically engineered to absorb treated water that is not permitted for consumption nor allowed to be discharged into the river.

The tree farm, platted into 11 units, was first begun in 2003 when the city of Chehalis purchased two parcels totaling 400 acres (160 ha) of a farm known as Hamilton Meadows. The grounds were investigated for potential Native American archaeological settlement and a grove of one-hundred year old Oregon white oak was protected. Grading and construction began during mid-2003. Approximately 46,000 poplars were first planted at the tree farm beginning in mid-2004. An irrigation system was installed that connected to the city's new wastewater treatment plant; the Chehalis Regional Water Reclamation Facility was completed in 2007 and wastewater was diverted to the farm the following year.

Although noted not to be the case early on, the tree farm was initially planned to be a source of revenue for the city when the trees were harvested, potentially for use as timber for furniture or pulp for paper. The first harvest of over 8,000 poplars began in 2025 and netted no more than $3,000. The first replanting of poplars took place in mid-2026.

== History ==
=== Purchase and construction ===
The city of Chehalis, Washington owns and operates the Chehalis Poplar Tree Farm. The farm was informally known as the "Chehalis Poplar Tree Plantation" and was renamed to its current moniker in 2021. The change was due to local concerns and subsequent actions requesting the removal of the word "plantation" as the term was considered objectionable.

In February 2003, at a cost of $1,700,000 (equivalent to $2,975,308 in 2025), the city purchased two parcels (Note: The city had no need for the south portion of the Hamilton farm but it was part of the overall listing of the property.) of the 400-acre (160 ha) Hamilton Meadows Farm (Note: The Hamilton Meadows Farm's acreage varies in reports, listed as high as 430 acres (170 ha).) for the purpose of a hybrid poplar tree farm as part of a cooperative process with a new wastewater treatment plant. Hamilton Meadows Farm was named after the prior owner, Hal Hamilton, who had owned the land since the early 1940s. After his death in 2001, his widow, Ruth, had decided to sell after it became a "strain to farm the property"; no decedents were willing to oversee the farm. Early agricultural uses for portions of the site unsuitable for poplars, or considered "sensitive areas", included the planting of hay for potential revenue.

The tree farm was originally listed as 247 acres (100 ha) in size and was part of the northern parcel of the Hamilton farm. (Note: The southern portion of the Hamilton farm, south of State Route 6, was listed at 150 acres (61 ha).) Only 40 acres (16 ha) of the south parcel were considered usable for a future grove of poplars due to the swampy nature of the grounds.

The site contained approximately 190 Oregon white oak trees spread over four sections totaling approximately 20 acres (8.1 ha); the oaks were estimated to be over one hundred years old. As part of the sale agreement, a single oak tree near Scheuber Road was to be protected in a fenced area. (Note: The ashes of the wife of a prior owner had been spread over the roots of the "lone oak".) Saving the "lone oak" was considered unfeasible as it intruded upon the necessary plan of the tree farm. (Note: Initially, the "lone oak" was protected during the first phase of the tree farm by an orange, plastic barrier with plans to plant poplars around the tree.) Instead, a 1.8-acre (0.73 ha) preserve was created to save 18 oaks. Additionally, 11 acres (4.5 ha) of pasture located in three sections were protected from use as part of the tree farm; the preservation was due to potential Native American archaeological importance. (Note: As much as 40 acres (16 ha) were originally identified as possibly archaeologically important. However, the larger protected expanse of land meant that modifications were too expensive in regards to the initial plans of the poplar farm and most of the archaeological areas were planted over. At the time of the grading of the lands for the tree farm, no arrowheads, bones, or other items denoting an indigenous village had been found.) The initial plans for the poplar tree farm required 180 acres (73 ha).

Using a farm located in Woodburn, Oregon as a model, the first phase of converting the farmland to a poplar and wastewater site included grading of the grounds beginning in July 2003; the creation of berms and installation of a fence around the property were also part of the early efforts; initial costs were estimated to be $1,500,000 (equivalent to $2,625,271 in 2025) and the project was funded as part of a $4,600,000 (equivalent to $8,050,832 in 2025) low-interest loan meant for the completion of a new sewage treatment plant in the city. From the beginning, future revenue from the sale of the poplars was estimated to be less than the total expenditures in the creation of the tree farm.

The main entrance into the site was completed by September 2003 and a barn was demolished after it was documented in accordance with requirements set forth by the Washington State Department of Archaeology and Historic Preservation. (Note: The red barn was deemed too expensive to save, requiring a new roof and other structural improvements.) A portion of the irrigation system, as well as the erection of a storage building, were in the process of completion. Phase two consisted of the planting of up to 46,000 poplar whips in summer 2024; a third and final part of the project was the construction of an above-ground irrigation system that connected directly to the new water treatment facility. The treatment plant; known as the Chehalis Regional Water Reclamation Facility, broke ground in March 2005 and was completed in September 2007. (Note: The 2007 wastewater treatment plant replaced the city's previous facility that was built in 1948. The new plant, at its opening, also treated wastewater for Napavine and a Lewis County sewer district.)

The farm at the time was the biggest of its type and purpose in Washington state and possibly the largest in the United States. The site was noted to be "the cheapest and the most beneficial option" chosen for the city's future treatment of wastewater. The forested grounds has become a wildlife habitat while also providing ecological benefits, such as being a carbon sink and an important part in the removal of excess nutrients. The tree farm was also considered to be an "aesthetic draw".

=== Growth phase, 2005 to 2025 ===
As of 2005, the poplars were part of a Washington State University Puyallup research project on water pollution. In 2006, the city of Chehalis reserved a 120-acre (49 ha) portion of the original southern parcel for use as a wetland mitigation site. Finding the parcel to lack economic value, attempts to plant poplars in the south section were also deemed as "not appropriate" as the grounds were not contiguous with the northern section. A flood-prone area located next to State Route 6, encompassing 68 acres (28 ha) over both parcels, was sold by the city as surplus in 2008.

=== First harvest and replanting, 2025 and 2026 ===
The first harvest of poplars occurred in July 2025. Approximately 8,800 trees, planted in 2003 and covering 40 acres (16 ha) over three units, were cut down. After costs associated with the harvest were included, the sale garnered no more than a $3,000 return. (Note: An early plan was to discard the harvested poplars in a dumpster as the price of the lumber had dropped from $50 per ton to $22 per ton in three years.) The harvest was the first step of a three-phase effort that continued into 2026 which included chipping, stump removal, and soil amendment, which consists of rotovating and subsoiling as a means to prepare the grounds for a successful replanting. During the harvest, poplars located in Unit 9 located next to State Route 6 were permanently removed so as to prevent accidents on the thoroughfare due to toppling trees. Approximately 60,000 feet (18,000 m) of the underground irrigation piping was replaced. The first replanting at the tree farm began in mid-2026 and consisted of poplar whips, at a cost of $4 each, planted in rows.

== Geography ==
The tree farm is located approximately 1 mile (1.6 km) west of Chehalis, Washington near Claquato on State Route 6. The total land area of the farm is 250 acres (100 ha) and consists of 11 units varying in size from over 9 acres (3.6 ha) to as much as 31 acres (13 ha). (Note: The total land area of the poplar tree farm has been listed in news reports as 250 acres (100 ha) since at least 2005. See sources in the article, post-2005.)

== Technical aspects ==
=== Poplars ===
Nine hybrid varieties of poplar, which have been genetically engineered to absorb wastewater, are grown at the site and planted in rows; Approximately 55,000 poplars were planned to be grown at the farm. The poplars are a hybrid of female black cottonwoods and male eastern cottonwoods; most the poplars at the farm are male. (Note: With a minimal number of female poplars, the risk of hybrid seeds spreading to native cottonwoods was estimated have a one-percent chance of occurring.) By the second year after planting, the poplars were listed to range in height between 2–14 feet (0.61–4.27 m).

Trees are pruned annually and are harvested on a rotating basis in sectioned units every 10 to 15 years; the poplars are estimated to be between 100–120 feet (30–37 m) tall by the end of their planned lifetime. The lumber was to be sold to produce paper; the trees were also planned in the early years of the operation to be sold as furniture grade timber or as veneer. No biosolids are used at the site.

When logged, the trees have been noted to lack the size to obtain interest for sale, despite the poplars being allowed to grow longer than originally planned. Due to the longer number of years of growth, the tree fields have been described as following more of the practices of a forestry site than an agricultural farm.

=== Wastewater treatment ===
The farm is part of Chehalis' water treatment program and is considered a renewable resource. Between 2004 and 2008, the poplar fields relied on rainfall. Beginning in 2008, Class 1 wastewater (Note: Early reports on the wastewater were designated as "Class A", or safe enough to meet drinking water standards though "not necessarily drinkable" due to a lack of testing for certain byproducts after treatment.) from the Chehalis Regional Water Reclamation Facility has been used to hydrate the poplar fields through the use of irrigation pipes.

The underground irrigation system was listed to be over 70,000 feet (21,000 m) long. Berms up to 2 feet (0.61 m) tall are constructed between each row of poplars to prevent the flow of wastewater off the grounds. As part of restrictions set by the Washington State Department of Ecology (WADOE) in order to protect the water quality of the Chehalis River, when the river's flow rate drops below 1,000 cubic feet (28 m^{3}) per second, the wastewater is diverted to the poplar farm by a pipe system constructed underneath the waterway. Previously, all wastewater had been commonly discharged into the river.

As part of managing and documenting the wastewater's infiltration into the soil, five monitoring wells were constructed as required by the WADOE.

An acre of the poplars can absorb up to 1 million US gallons (3.8 Ml) of water per year, as well as 400 pounds (180 kg) of nitrogen, a wastewater byproduct. Reclaimed and treated water not absorbed by the poplars recharges the local aquifer.

== Environment and wildlife ==
Originally meadow and pasture land, trees such as Oregon white oak and ash populated the site. In the southern parcel, maples and willow are located near the banks of the Chehalis River. Native plants include canary grass and stinging nettles. While part of the Hamilton Meadow Farm, crops such as corn and spinach seed were grown; cattle and turkeys were also raised on the lands.

Coyotes are found at the farm; the species has caused damage to the sprinkler system by chewing on the water lines, requiring "constant maintenance".

== See also ==
- Flood history in Chehalis, Washington
