= Henry C. Davis (businessman) =

Washington State pioneer and pharmacist

Henry Clay Davis
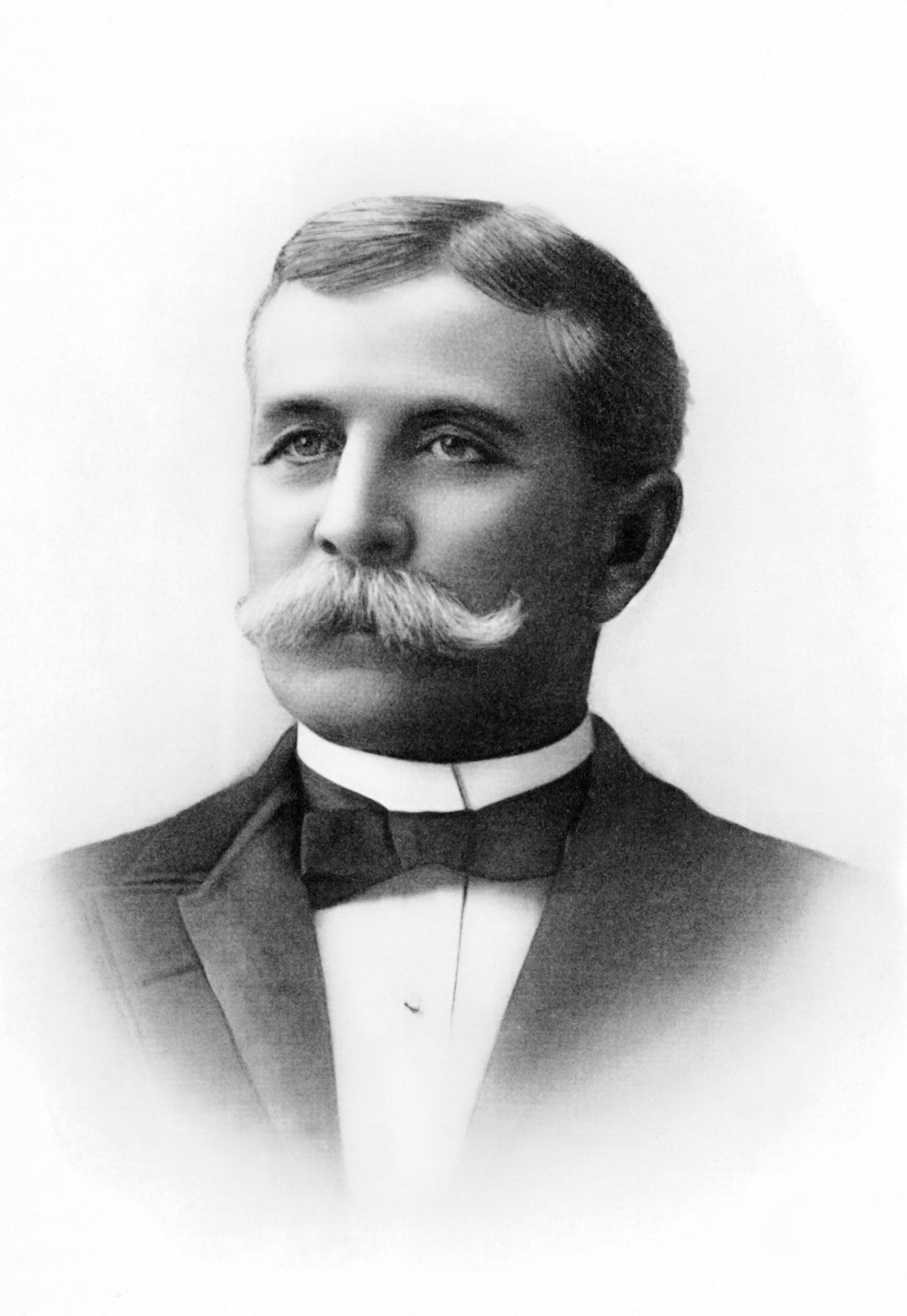
- Born: July 12, 1845; Fort Wayne, Indiana
- Died: April 22, 1912 (aged 66); Claquato, Washington
- Burial place: Claquato Cemetery
- Occupations: Tacoma treasurer; pharmacist; real estate businessman; Northern Pacific Railway general agent
- Organization: Washington State Historical Society
- Known for: Was a Washington State pioneer, pharmacist, and real estate businessman. Served as Tacoma Treasurer for three years. Was a member of the Davis family, one of the founding families of the Claquato town.
- Spouse: Ida A. Scott (married 1889 – 1912
- Children: Ethel Lillian Davis; Donald Jerome Davis
- Parents: Lewis H. Davis (father); Susan Clinger (mother)

Henry Clay Davis (July 12, 1845 – April 22, 1912) was a Washington State pioneer, pharmacist, real estate businessman, and speculator who lived in Tacoma and Claquato. He came to Tacoma in 1878 and worked in the pharmacy business for eight years, co-owning a drug-store in the city. Over the years, the store was devastated by fire three times. Davis experienced big losses, and eventually extracted himself from pharmaceutical business, focusing for several years on Tacoma real estate. One of his achievements was the financing of the first-ever three-story brick building in the city. Davis actively participated in other Tacoma organizations: he worked as the city treasurer for three years, was a general agent for the Northern Pacific Railway in the city agency, and was a member of the first city military organization.

In later years, Davis kept making deals and investing in real estate in his native town, Claquato, located near Chehalis, Washington. He entered the mining business, investing in anthracite coal mines along the Cowlitz River.

From 1896 to 1900, Davis was a member of the board of curators of the Washington State Historical Society.

== Early life, family and education ==
Davis was born on July 12, 1845, in Fort Wayne, Indiana. He lived there for five years, until the family moved to Portland, Oregon, in 1851. A year later, they moved to Washington state, settling near Cowlitz Landing, the historic canoe landing two miles from Toledo. The family lived there for a year before moving to Claquato, which was a promising town until the Northern Pacific Railway choose Chehalis as its station point in 1874, leaving Claquato an economic ghost town.

His parents were Lewis H. Davis and Susan Clinger, and Henry was one of seven siblings, having two sisters and four brothers. Davis' father served as a soldier in a number of wars. Henry was a pioneer of Washington State and made big contributions in founding and developing Claquato town's infrastructure and layout. Over the years, all of the Davis children were associated with the development of Washington State.

Davis went to the public schools of Lewis County.

== Career ==
Davis first started to work at the family farm. After his father's death, he worked at different jobs until he decided to go to Tacoma.

=== Tacoma, Washington ===
Davis settled in Tacoma in 1878 and entered the pharmacy business there. He co-owned a drug-store with Doctor H. C. Bostwick, who was known as the first physician of the city. Davis worked in the pharmacy for about eight years. The drug-store was destroyed by fire three times, resulting in big losses for the owners, and eventually Davis left the business.

Davis was elected treasurer of Tacoma on June 1, 1881. He stayed at the position for three years, being re-elected on May 7, 1882, and June 7, 1883.

After his terms as city treasurer, Davis entered the real estate business, working in the field for several years. During this time, he built the first-ever three-story brick building in Tacoma, and later rented it for "good profit."

Living in Tacoma, Davis also worked as a general agent for the Northern Pacific Railway. In 1881, he became a member of the first Tacoma military organization.

=== Claquato, Washington ===
In 1888, Davis returned to live at his farm in Claquato, Washington. There, he invested in the anthracite coal mining business located on the Cowlitz River. The deposits in that area were then considered "the purest in the state or in the west."

Davis was still investing in property as a general speculator. As a real estate businessman, Davis donated 5 acres (2.0 ha) of Claquato land, at the time priced $100 per acre ($2,600 per acre in 2020 dollars (Note: The approximate value converted to 2020 dollars, based on a standard adjustment of the 1913 dollar value using the Consumer Price Index as calculated by United States Department of Labor.)), to the Independent Order of Odd Fellows Cemetery.

=== Other positions and activity ===
From 1896 to 1900, Davis was a member of the board of curators in Washington State Historical Society. At different times, he worked under the leadership of Arthur A. Denny, Washingtonian pioneer and one of Seattle's founders, and William Farrand Prosser, American politician, historian and Union Army colonel.

== Personal life and death ==
Davis married Ida A. Scott in 1889. Originally from Pennsylvania, she emigrated to Washington State in 1884 with her family. Henry and Ida had a daughter Ethel Lillian Davis and a son Donald Jerome Davis.

The Davises were members of the Presbyterian church.

Davis died on April 22, 1912, in Claquato, Washington, and was buried in Claquato Cemetery. He left an estate estimated at $110,000 ($170,000), which was equally divided between his living family members: wife Ida and son Donald. Some funds were also allocated in support of Davis' blind sister.

== See also ==
- Fort Wayne, Indiana
- Washington State Historical Society

== Literature cited ==
- "CPI Inflation Calculator", Bureau of Labor Statistics, Washington: United States Department of Labor
- "Tacoma news items", Spokane Falls Review, Spokane Falls: Frank M. Dallam, p. 5, March 18, 1890, LCCN sn86072021, OCLC 277635671
- "New officers elected", Seattle Post-Intelligencer, Seattle: Leigh S. J. Hunt, p. 3, December 17, 1899, ISSN 2379-7304, LCCN sn83045604, OCLC 9563195
- Scripps, Edward, ed. (April 23, 1912), "State news", The Tacoma Times, Tacoma: E. W. Scripps Company, p. 8, ISSN 2158-4729, LCCN sn88085187, OCLC 17347623
- "H. C. Davis estate $110,000", Seattle Post-Intelligencer, Seattle: Leigh S. J. Hunt, p. 13, May 29, 1912, ISSN 2379-7304, LCCN sn83045604, OCLC 9563195
- Fuller, Edward N. (September 1, 1899), "The Washington State Historical Society", The Washington Historian, vol. 1, no. 1, Tacoma: Washington State Historical Society, pp. 45–52, LCCN 05000235, OCLC 11580302
- Hines, Harvey Kimball (1893), An Illustrated History of the State of Washington, Chicago: The Lewis Publishing Company, LCCN rc01000322, OCLC 1104881358
- Hunt, Herbert (1916), Tacoma its history and its builders; a half century of activity, vol. 1, Chicago: S. J. Clarke Publishing Company, LCCN 18005073, OCLC 656923949
- Kirk, Ruth; Alexander, Carmela (1990), Exploring Washington's past: a road guide to history, Seattle: University of Washington Press, ISBN 0295974435, LCCN 89036074, OCLC 20012190
- Prosser, William Farrand (1903), Lewis, Edward Gardner (ed.), A history of the Puget Sound country, its resources, its commerce and its people, New York City: Edward Gardner Lewis, LCCN 05013767
- Zander, Julie McDonald (2011), Chehalis, Images of America, Charleston: Arcadia Publishing, ISBN 978-0738576039, LCCN 2011925219, OCLC 752199102
