= Ruth Kirk (disambiguation) =

Ruth Kirk may refer to

- Ruth Kirk (1922–2000), wife of New Zealand prime minister Norman Kirk
- Ruth Kirk (author) (1925–2018), author, naturist, and PBS filmographer from Washington State
- Ruth M. Kirk (1930–2011), American politician from Maryland
