= Wilma Rosbach =

American politician

Member of the Washington House of Representatives for the 20th district
- In office 1979–1983

Personal details
- Born: August 7, 1921 Carrington, North Dakota, U.S.
- Died: January 31, 2018 (aged 96) Chehalis, Washington, U.S.
- Party: Republican
- Occupation: business, Director of Lewis Federal Savings & Loan

Wilma Rosbach Brown (August 7, 1921 – January 31, 2018) was an American politician in the state of Washington. She served the 20th district from 1979 to 1983. She operated a clothing store with her husband, Chuck in Chehalis, Washington. Rosbach died from cancer in January 2018 at the age of 96.
