= KMNT =

- Chehalis, Washington; United States
- Broadcast area: Centralia, Washington
- Frequency: 104.3 MHz (HD Radio)
- Branding: 104.3 KMNT

Programming
- Format: Country music

Ownership
- Owner: Bicoastal Media Licenses IV, LLC
- Sister stations: KELA (AM)

Technical information
- Licensing authority: FCC
- Facility ID: 162476
- Class: C3
- ERP: 2,350 watts horizontal; 16,500 watts vertical
- HAAT: 322 meters
- Transmitter coordinates: 46°33′18″N 123°3′27″W

Links
- Public license information: Public file; LMS
- Webcast: Listen Live
- Website: kmnt.com

KMNT (104.3 FM) is a radio station broadcasting a country music format and located in Chehalis, Washington, United States. As of 2025, the station is owned by Bicoastal Media Licenses Iv, LLC.

== History ==
KMNT's country music format started at FM 102.9. KMNT began as a country music radio station on 104.3 in 2005 and has become known under the moniker, "The Mountain". The station was named as grand marshal of the 75th Santa Parade, an annual year-end holiday event held in Chehalis.

== Programming ==
KMNT's broadcasts are centralized on country music with additional focus on local news, primarily live-coverage of local high school sports. The station also covers emergency events and weather reports. The station hosts a daily call-in show known as "Let's Talk About It".
