= KELA (AM) =

- Centralia-Chehalis, Washington; United States
- Frequency: 1470 kHz

Programming
- Format: Talk and sports
- Affiliations: Fox News Radio

Ownership
- Owner: Bicoastal Media; (Bicoastal Media Licenses IV, LLC)
- Sister stations: KMNT

History
- First air date: November 1, 1937

Technical information
- Licensing authority: FCC
- Facility ID: 32996
- Class: B
- Power: 5,000 watts (day); 1,000 watts (night)
- Transmitter coordinates: 46°41′47″N 122°57′23″W

Links
- Public license information: Public file; LMS
- Webcast: Listen Live
- Website: kelaam.com

KELA (1470 AM) is a commercial radio station co-licensed to Centralia and Chehalis, Washington, United States. Bicoastal Media currently owns the station, which carries a talk and sports format.

The studios, offices and transmitter are located on South Gold Street in Centralia.

== History ==
Under owners Arthur St. John, Cecil Gwinn, and J. Elroy McCaw, the Central Broadcasting Company of Chehalis was incorporated in October 1936, beginning the formation of the station. Located on grounds adjoining the Southwest Washington Fairgrounds between the twin cities of Centralia and Chehalis, the early plans for the $35,000 station included operating at 1,000 watts and locating broadcasting studios in both neighboring communities.

During a ceremony before the opening, a concrete block with the imprints of Bing Crosby's hands and feet, including an inscription of "Best Wishes KELA...Bing," was installed near the entrance. Crosby, who had a family history in Western Washington, was meant to attend but cancelled due to other career commitments. KELA first signed on the air on November 1, 1937. The event was broadcast on 70 affiliate stations under the Mutual Broadcasting System, operating on 1440 kHz, powered at 500 watts over a 185 foot (56 metres) antenna. After the enactment of the North American Regional Broadcasting Agreement (NARBA) in 1941, the station switched to its current dial position of 1470 kHz, powered at 1,000 watts. KELA was a network affiliate of the Mutual Broadcasting System and the Don Lee Network during the "Golden Age of Radio."

In the 1960s, the power was boosted to the current 5,000 watts during the daytime while maintaining KELA's 1,000-watt nighttime power. As network programming moved to TV, KELA began airing a full service, middle of the road music format with news updates from Mutual. On August 24, 1965, it put an FM station on the air, 102.9 KELA-FM (now KZTM). KELA-FM ran an automated country music format while carrying some of KELA's newscasts. McCaw sold his interest in 1965 to Joe Chytil.

Over time, 1470 KELA added more talk shows and reduced the music until it was a full-time talk station. It became an ABC Radio News affiliate. KELA-FM switched its call sign to KMNT but remained a country station. In 1996, Jacor Communications bought KELA and KMNT for $4 million. Clear Channel Communications acquired Jacor. In mid-1996, the Lewis County Historical Society and Museum added an exhibit that highlighted the history of KELA and McCaw's operations.

During the 1996 flood in the Chehalis Valley, KELA went off the air when the waters inundated the building. The station operated out of portable trailers for a time after additional floodwaters in 2007 submerged the area. In 2007, Clear Channel (now iHeartMedia) spun off KELA to Bicoastal Media but retained the FM station, which had changed its call letters to KNBQ. KMNT's call letters and programming moved to 104.3 FM, also owned by Bicoastal.

== Programming ==
Weekdays begin with two local news and talk shows, "The KELA Morning Report" and "Let's Talk About It," originally created by Ed Jeffries. The Let's Talk About It program was hosted from its inception by future Centralia city mayor and council member, Bill Moeller, until 1993. Moeller was originally a disk jockey at the station beginning in the 1960s. Moeller hosted the only rock-and-roll slot at KELA at the time, known as the Record Roundtable.

KELA is an affiliate of the Seattle Mariners Radio Network and the Seattle Seahawks Radio Network. It also carries the University of Washington Huskies football and basketball, as well as local high school football and basketball games.
