= Medical facilities of Seattle =

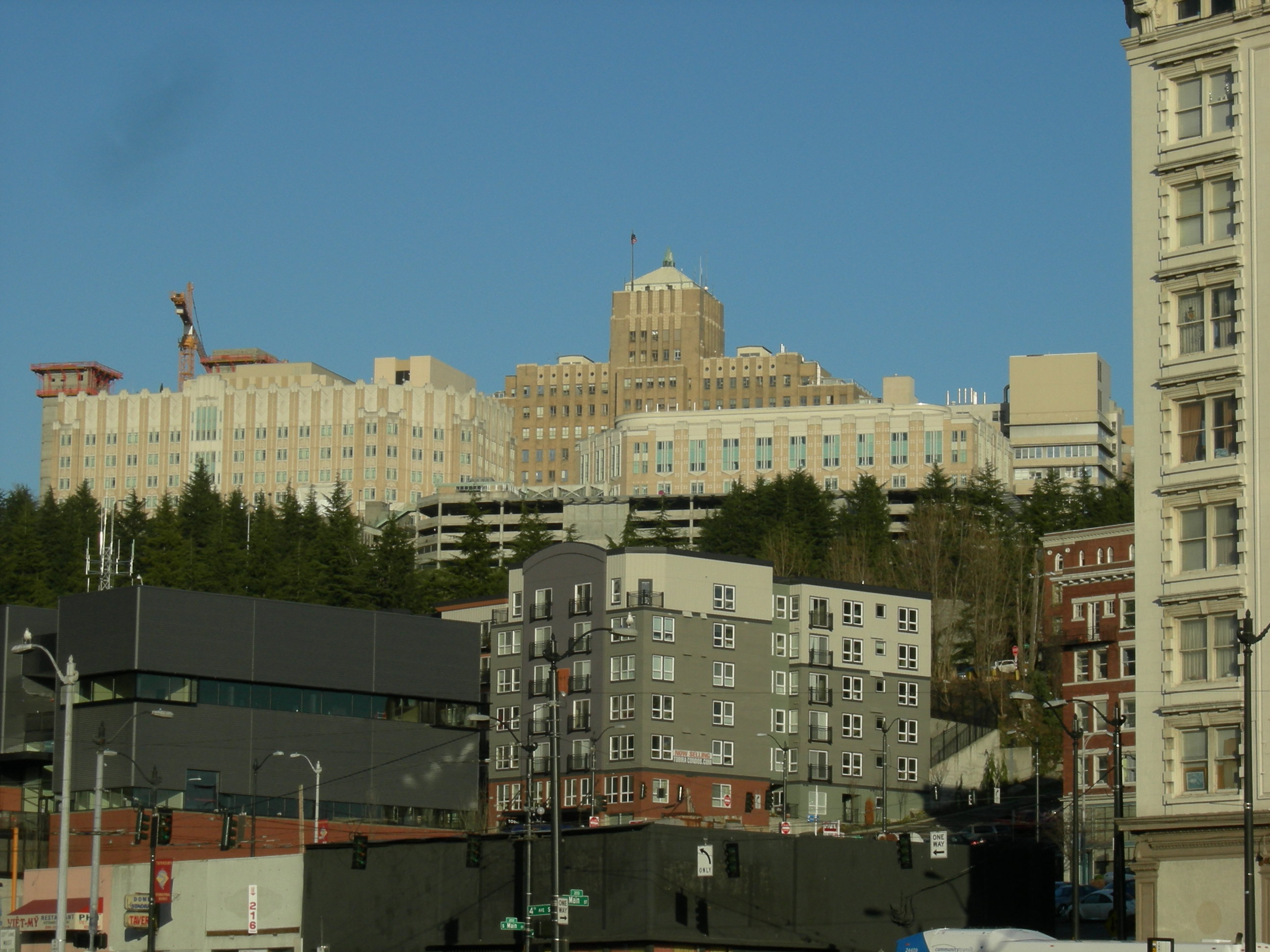
Harborview Medical Center sits on a hill overlooking Downtown Seattle

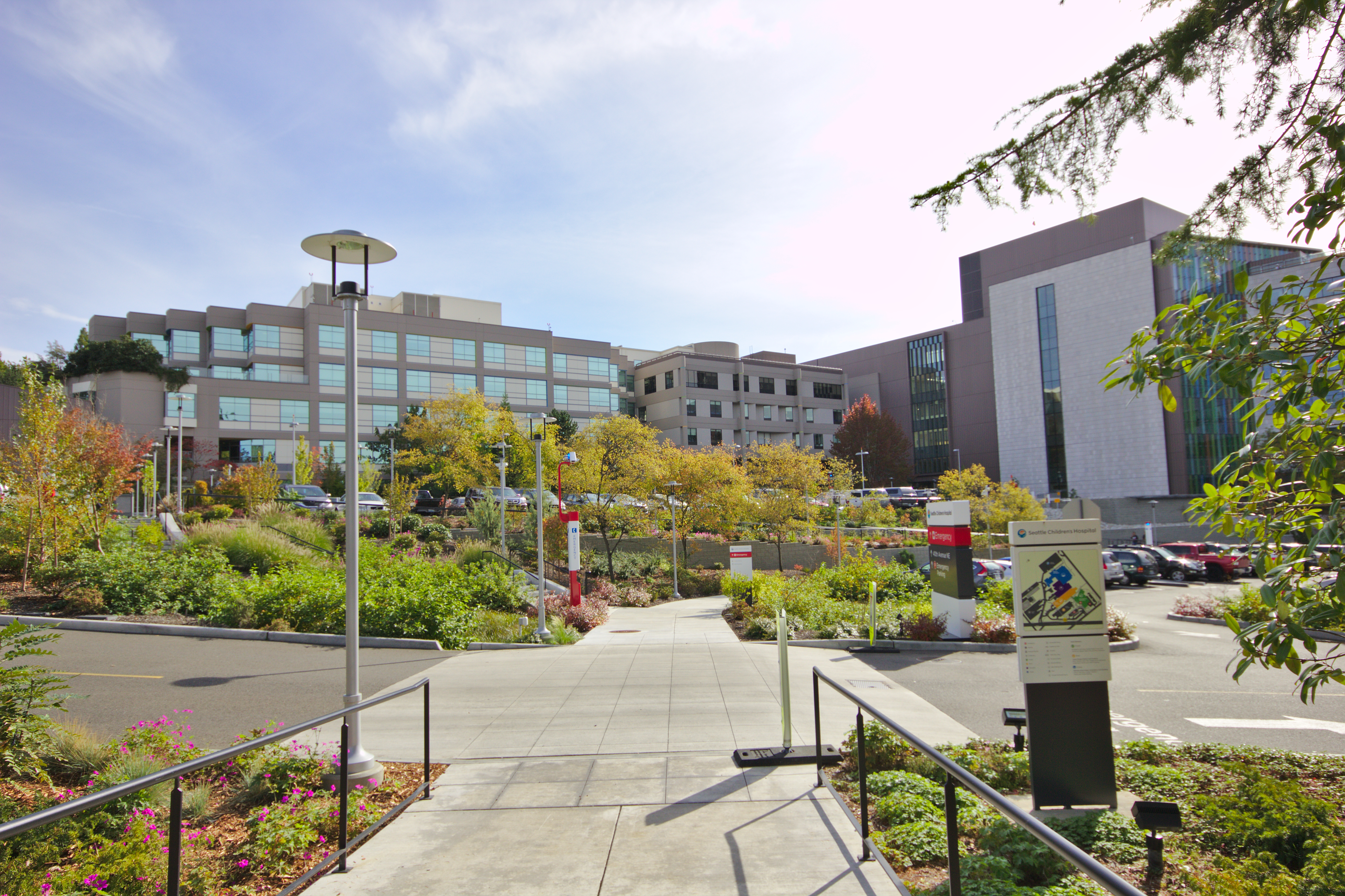
Seattle Children's Hospital is located just east of the University of Washington campus

Seattle is the largest city in the U.S. state of Washington and has several large medical facilities and institutions that serve the Pacific Northwest region. The University of Washington is consistently ranked among the country's leading institutions in medical research and manages the UW Medicine system, which owns and operates University of Washington Medical Center and Northwest Hospital & Medical Center. UW Medicine operates the county-owned Harborview Medical Center, which is also the only Level I trauma center in the Pacific Northwest and serves patients with traumatic injuries from the states of Washington, Alaska, Idaho, and Montana.

The First Hill neighborhood is widely known as "Pill Hill" for its high concentration of hospitals and other medical offices. The neighborhood is the home of Harborview Medical Center; the flagship hospital of the Swedish Health Services system; and Virginia Mason Hospital. In 1908, Swedish became the first hospital to open on First Hill and was followed by Virginia Mason in 1920 and Harborview in 1931; other hospitals also opened on the hill in the early 20th century but later closed, including Cabrini Hospital, Maynard Hospital, Seattle General Hospital, and Doctors Hospital. Doctors, Swedish, and Seattle General hospitals merged to form Swedish Medical Center in 1975; the system later acquired the Ballard Community Hospital, serving Ballard in northwestern Seattle, in 1992 and the Providence Seattle Medical Center on Cherry Hill in 2000.

The city was a pioneer in the development of modern paramedic services with the establishment of Medic One in 1970; a 60 Minutes story in 1971 on the success of the Medic One paramedic system called Seattle "the best place in the world to have a heart attack." Group Health Cooperative, founded in 1947, was one of the first insurance groups in the United States to provide managed care. The cooperative was acquired in 2017 by Kaiser Permanente, who continue to operate Group Health's major hospital and outpatient center at the former St. Luke's Hospital. Various medical research institutions are also located in the city, particularly concentrated in the South Lake Union area; these institutions include the Fred Hutchinson Cancer Center, the Center for Global Infectious Disease Research, and the Allen Institute.

Other hospitals in the city include the Seattle Children's Hospital in the Laurelhurst neighborhood, the pediatric referral center for Washington, Alaska, Idaho, Montana, and Wyoming. The hospital was founded in 1908 as part of the now-defunct Seattle General Hospital and moved to Laurelhurst in 1953, where it has since expanded to 407 beds. In addition, most Seattle Children's physicians hold faculty appointments at the University of Washington School of Medicine and are employed by the Children's University Medical Group practice plan. The city is also served by the Seattle Division of the Department of Veterans Affairs' Puget Sound Health Care System, which opened its Beacon Hill campus in 1951.

== List of general hospitals ==
Hospitals in Seattle
Name	Type	Location	Beds	Trauma designation	Opened	Affiliation	Notes
Harborview Medical Center	Public	First Hill	413	I	1877	UW Medicine	
Kaiser Permanente Capitol Hill	Non-profit	Capitol Hill	50	—	1906	Kaiser Permanente	Formerly operated by Group Health Cooperative
Seattle Children's	Non-profit	Laurelhurst	371	I (PR)	1907		
Seattle VA Medical Center	Government	Beacon Hill	274	—	1951	Veterans Health Administration	
Swedish Medical Center Ballard	Non-profit	Ballard	133	—	1928	Providence Health & Services	
Swedish Medical Center Cherry Hill	Non-profit	Cherry Hill	385	—	1877	Providence Health & Services	
Swedish Medical Center First Hill	Non-profit	First Hill	830	—	1910	Providence Health & Services	
UW Medical Center – Northwest	Public	Northgate	281	IV	1960	UW Medicine	
University of Washington Medical Center	Public	Montlake	450	—	1959	UW Medicine	
Virginia Mason Medical Center	Public	First Hill	371	—	1920	CommonSpirit Health	

== See also ==
- List of hospitals in Washington (state)
