= Frank Everett =

Furniture manufacturer, and social activist of Chehalis, Washington

- Born: August 28, 1861; Allegan, Michigan
- Died: February 25, 1920 (aged 58); Pasadena, California
- Occupations: Frank Everett & Company (president); Chehalis Furniture & Manufacturing Company (president)
- Years active: c. 1883 – 1920
- Organizations: Chehalis Citizens' Club; Ancient Order of United Workmen; Knights of Pythias
- Known for: Established a hardware business and furniture manufacture in Chehalis, Washington, and took an active participation in the city's development.
- Political party: Republican
- Spouse: Josephine Fesenfeld (married 1887)
- Children: 1

Frank Everett (August 28, 1861 – August 25, 1920) was a hardware businessman, furniture manufacturer, and social activist of Chehalis, Washington. As a prominent member of the Citizens' Club, Everett lobbied various development projects through Chehalis City Council. As a businessman, he built the biggest hardware store in the county, which he owned for many years under the name Frank Everett & Company. It is now considered a historical building and is a part of Chehalis historical tour. Everett was also a stockholder and president of the Chehalis Furniture & Manufacturing Company, providing work for hundreds of local people.

== Early life, family and education ==
Frank Everett was born on August 28, 1861, in Allegan, Michigan. His father, John Everett, was a merchant and farmer from Peru, New York, and his mother was Charlotte Root, born in Ohio; she died while Everett was still an infant. Everett studied in the Allegan public schools, and later visited and lived in a number of cities with his father. In 1873, they settled in Lyons, Kansas, where both father and son were engaged in farming. In 1882, they briefly visited Tacoma, Washington, and in 1883 came to Chehalis, Washington, to live.

== Career ==
=== Hardware business ===
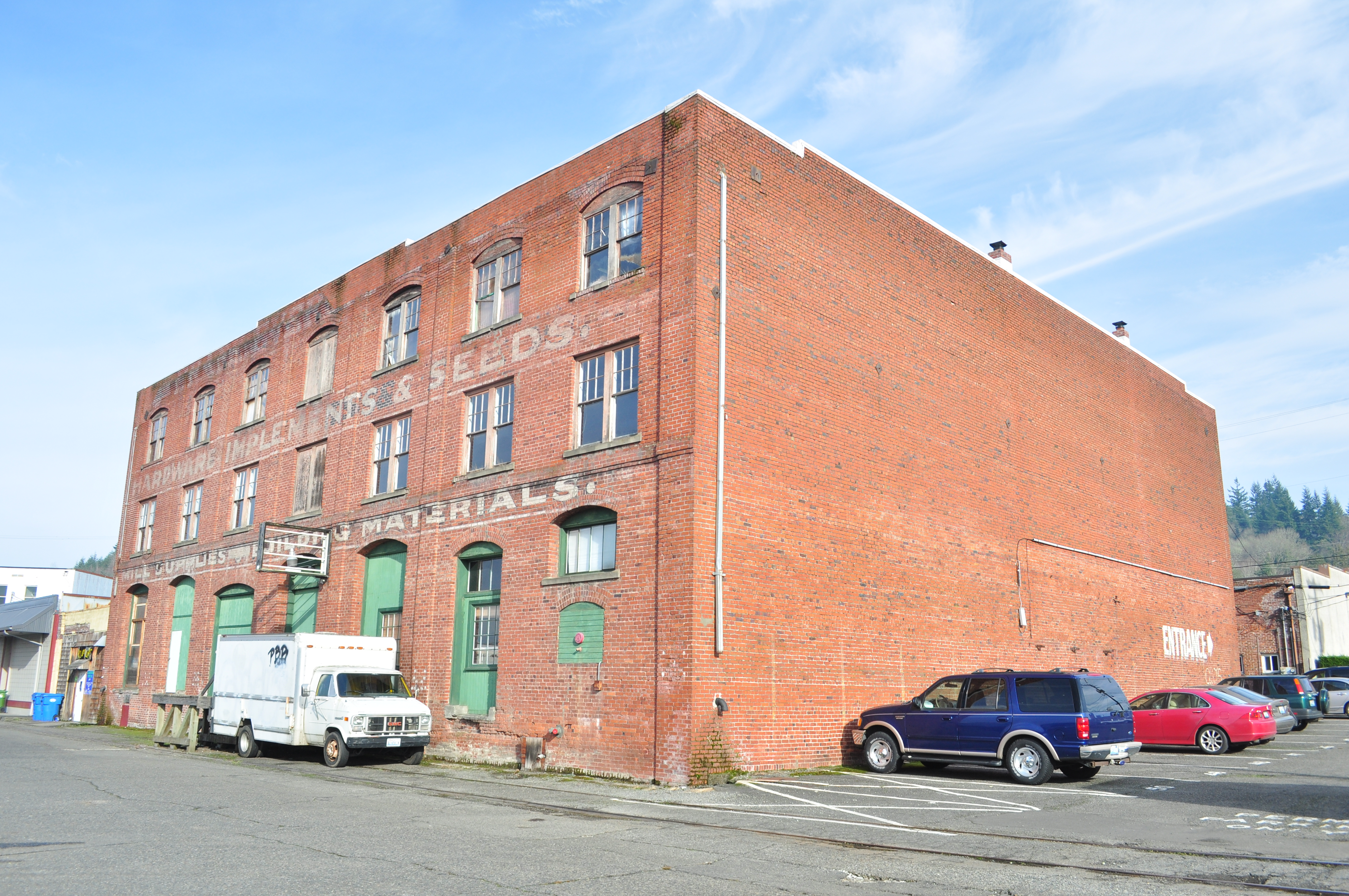
Frank Everett & Co. historical building (2015)

In Chehalis, Everett was engaged in the hardware business. He opened his own store, but sold it later to Deveresse & Maynard to be able to go to California, where he spent eighteen months. After his return, in 1889, Everett bought the store again, and with his partner, F. M. Power, established Everett & Power. Later, Everett bought his partner's share and paired up with Charles W. Maynard, renaming the firm Maynard & Everett. In 1900, Maynard ran for state treasurer, leaving Everett the sole owner. Lewis county treasurer A. C. St. John eventually bought Maynard's share, and after that it was called Frank Everett & Company. Despite the turnover in partners, Everett remained head of the firm until his retirement, and was credited for its success. By 1903, the store had become the largest in the county. The size of the main building was 60 ft × 100 ft (18 m × 30 m), and there was also an annex and storage building, sized 50 ft × 110 ft (15 m × 34 m). The firm provided large stocks of wagons, carriages, farm machinery, stoves, and some builders' hardware; it was also engaged in the plumbing business. Everett retired from the hardware business in 1909 to engage fully in furniture manufacture.

Meanwhile, the hardware company kept the name Frank Everett & Company and continued to grow. Everett's share was taken over by his previous partners, F. M. Power and A. C. St. Jones. By 1916, the main building was renovated and expanded, and the foundation for a three-story warehouse on Pacific Avenue was put in, covering the 100 ft × 120 ft (30 m × 37 m) piece of land. By 1920, it was successfully operated by the Hansen-Scott Company. Its establishers, J. D. Hansen and W. E. Scott, had previously worked for Frank Everett & Company as vice-president and travelling representative. In 1924, the Hansen-Scott Company's purchase of the Frank Everett & Company three-story warehouse was called "one of the largest real estate transfers in Chehalis." As of 2020, this building, located at 546 Northwest Pacific Avenue, was featured on the official Chehalis history tour.

=== Furniture manufacture ===
By 1903, Everett became stockholder and served as president of the Chehalis Furniture & Manufacturing Company. The company produced bedroom sets, tables, and kitchen furniture; its facilities included a factory, drying houses, and various machinery and appliances. By 1903, about 175 men worked in the factory and mills.

After his retirement from the hardware business in 1909, Everett gave his full attention to furniture manufacture. He worked as a manufacturer until he developed health problems.

== Memberships and social activity ==
In Chehalis, Everett was a member of the Citizens' Club, an organization, that actively participated in the city's life and development. In 1900, he joined the committee empowered to communicate with the City Council regarding the building of a city park. In 1903, he was elected treasurer of the club.

Everett was also a member of the Ancient Order of United Workmen and the Knights of Pythias.

== Personal life ==
In 1887, Everett married Josephine Fesenfeld, a woman of German and English descent, born in Melbourne, Australia. They had a daughter.

The Everetts were communicants of the Episcopal church, where Everett was a vestryman. Throughout his life, Everett supported the Republican political party.

Everett died on February 25, 1920, at his home in Pasadena, California, after a brief illness.

== See also ==
- Allegan, Michigan
- Ancient Order of United Workmen
- Knights of Pythias

== Literature cited ==
- "2: Frank Everett & Co. – 1916, 547 Northwest Pacific Avenue", ci.chehalis.wa.us, Chehalis: City of Chehalis
- Blethen, Alden J., ed. (April 2, 1900), "At Chehalis", Seattle Daily Times, Seattle: The Seattle Times Company, p. 4, ISSN 2639-4898, LCCN sn86072007, OCLC 1765328
- Blethen, Alden J., ed. (January 11, 1903), "Chehalis Citizens' Club", Seattle Daily Times, Seattle: The Seattle Times Company, p. 27, ISSN 2639-4898, LCCN sn86072007, OCLC 1765328
- Blethen, Alden J., ed. (July 6, 1908), "Long auto trip", Seattle Daily Times, Seattle: The Seattle Times Company, p. 12, ISSN 2639-4898, LCCN sn86072007, OCLC 1765328
- "Era of building on in Chehalis", Seattle Daily Times, Seattle: The Seattle Times Company, p. 21, May 7, 1916, ISSN 2639-4898, LCCN sn86072007, OCLC 1765328
- Bush, Dan W., ed. (August 27, 1920), "Frank Everett died", Chehalis Bee Nugget, vol. 37, no. 3, Chehalis: The Bee-Nugget publishing company, p. 2, LCCN sn88085553, OCLC 17560756
- Bush, Dan W., ed. (February 3, 1922), "Big farm machinery house", Chehalis Bee Nugget, Chehalis: The Bee-Nugget publishing company, p. 2, LCCN sn88085553, OCLC 17560756
- Bush, Dan W., ed. (May 16, 1924), "Large realty deal", Chehalis Bee Nugget, vol. 41, no. 50, Chehalis: The Bee-Nugget publishing company, p. 1, LCCN sn88085553, OCLC 17560756
- Bush, Dan W., ed. (May 6, 1927), "Agricultureties", Chehalis Bee Nugget, Chehalis: The Bee-Nugget publishing company, p. 7, LCCN sn88085553, OCLC 17560756
- Bush, Dan W., ed. (October 25, 1929), "20 years ago", Chehalis Bee Nugget, Chehalis: The Bee-Nugget publishing company, p. 6, LCCN sn88085553, OCLC 17560756
- Bush, Dan W., ed. (May 22, 1931), "F. M. Power in business here 42 years", Chehalis Bee Nugget, Chehalis: The Bee-Nugget publishing company, p. 15, LCCN sn88085553, OCLC 17560756
- Prosser, William Farrand (1903), Lewis, Edward Gardner (ed.), A history of the Puget Sound country, its resources, its commerce and its people, New York City: Edward Gardner Lewis, LCCN 05013767
