= Ernst Bechly =

Ernst Carl Bechly
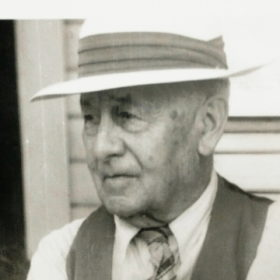
- Born: July 24, 1872; Sheboygan, Wisconsin, US
- Died: March 29, 1954 (aged 81); Chehalis, Washington, US
- Occupations: Surveyor; map maker
- Known for: early Washington state maps
- Spouse: Grace Henrietta Foster
- Children: 1

Ernst Carl Bechly (July 24, 1872 – March 29, 1954) was an American surveyor and map maker.

== Early life ==
Ernst Carl Bechly was the first son of Charles Heinrich Bechly and Sophie Keffel. He relocated with his family from Sheboygan, Wisconsin to Chehalis, Washington in 1891. Bechly served in the Spanish–American War in 1898. In 1905, he married Grace Henrietta Foster and they had a daughter Constance Josephine.

== Career ==
In 1903, Bechly began his career with the Lewis County, Washington engineer's department. He was promoted to county surveyor in 1907, and to county engineer in 1909. Bechly worked several years surveying the original layout of US 12 across the Cascade Mountains, and he retired in 1950 after 47 years of service to the department.

Bechly was a member of the Society of American Military Engineers, a registered Professional Engineer, a member of the Elks Lodge (No. 1374), and a member of the Reformed Church in America.

Also, Bechly was awarded a United States Patent for "Stringer Separator" in 1937 as a means to extend the service life of stringers in bridge construction.

== Mapmaking ==
Bechly is best known for his map of the Washington Territory, west of the Cascade Range. This map, printed in 1951, showed detail of the military forts, Indian reservations, cities, and other key points that existed in 1870 prior to statehood. He was also noted for a map of Lewis County, Washington that was published in 1909.
