= Seattle General Hospital =

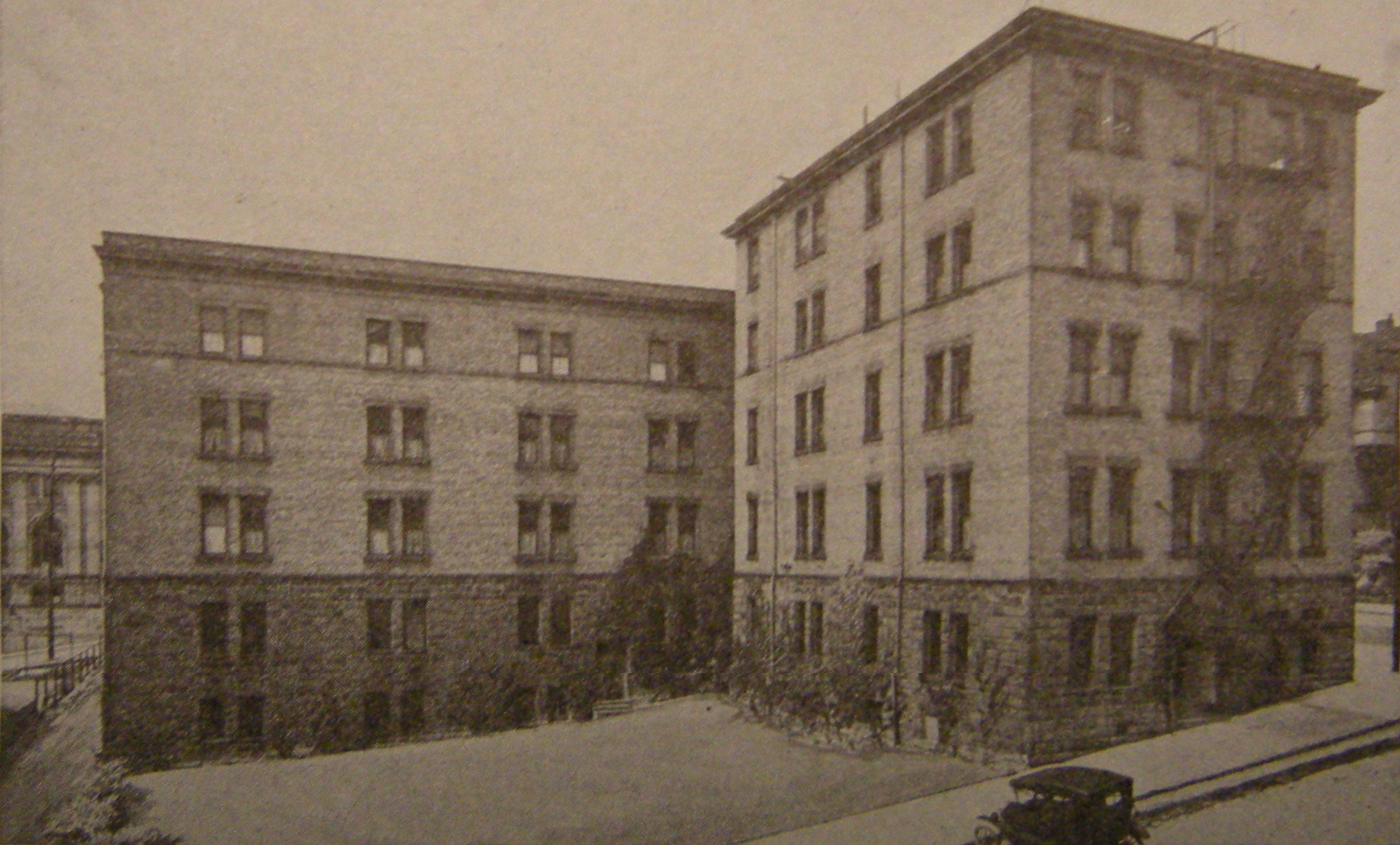
- Seattle General Hospital and School for Nurses (1917)

Geography
- Location: Seattle, Washington, United States
- Coordinates: 47.616596°N 122.352312°W

Organization
- Religious affiliation: Protestant

History
- Opened: July 1, 1895
- Closed: 1980

Links
- Lists: Hospitals in Washington state

Seattle General Hospital and School for Nurses was a hospital and nursing school in the U.S. state of Washington. It was located at 909 Fifth Avenue in Seattle. The hospital was originally established in 1895 and reopened in a new building in 1900. In 1980, it merged with Swedish Medical Center.

== History ==
Seattle General Hospital was inaugurated on July 1, 1895, as a private Protestant hospital in the three-story Avon House at 2823 First Avenue. In 1897, it shifted location to the Sarah B. Yesler home at Second Avenue North and Republican Street. In 1899, following acquisition by the Deaconess Home Society of the Methodist Church, funds were raised to build a new five-story hospital at 909 Fifth Avenue, which opened in November 1900.

In 1905, a wing was added on the Fifth Avenue side, taking its total bed count to 125. The seven ward Children's Orthopedic Hospital was established in the hospital in 1907. Between 1897 and 1938, 598 student nurses were trained at the hospital, but it ceased being run by the Methodist church in 1935. J. W. Efaw was president of the hospital in the early 1930s. From 1902 to 1961, a medical internship program was offered by the hospital to graduates, and was the only hospital in Washington with less than 150 beds approved for internship training. Between 1952 and 1958, the Fifth and Marion building was extended to provide for new surgery facilities, laboratories and beds. The age, space limitations, and location of the hospital building caused the trustees to seek another location in the late 1960s. Sale of the downtown site to the Bank of California led to negotiations with the Steward's Foundation, owners of the Maynard Hospital at University and Summit. On April 1, 1971, Seattle General took ownership and operation of that facility.

In the 1970s, important structural changes were made to the hospital's organization and in October 1975, the governing bodies of Seattle General Hospital and The Doctors and Swedish Hospitals eventually announced that they would merge. This was formally recognized on May 5, 1978, when they merged into the Swedish Medical Centre, leading to the closure of the Seattle General facility, which moved to the Seattle Doctors Pavilion in June 1980.
