= Point-In-Time Count =

American annual homeless person survey

The Point-in-Time Count, or PIT Count, is an annual survey of homeless people in the United States conducted by local agencies called Continuums of Care (CoCs) on behalf of the United States Department of Housing and Urban Development (HUD). HUD uses the data from PIT counts to evaluate the effectiveness of local agencies' efforts to address homelessness and to determine funding amounts for them, and also compiles this data into the Annual Homeless Assessment Report, which is provided to Congress. HUD defines the PIT as a "count of sheltered and unsheltered homeless persons carried out on one night in the last 10 calendar days of January or at such other time as required by HUD."

The PIT consists of an observational count and a survey of homeless people, the former to establish a sense of scale and the latter to estimate the number of individuals in various subcategories, like homeless veterans or homeless youth.

== Methodology ==
Methodology varies slightly between CoCs, to allow them to adapt to their individual needs. Generally, though, the PIT consists of two parts: an unsheltered count and a sheltered count. Both are required to be conducted on a single night in the last ten days of January. The sheltered count requires CoCs to collect information from emergency shelters, transitional housing, and safe havens. The unsheltered count is more difficult as it generally involves volunteers traveling to places where they expect people experiencing homelessness to be (under bridges, encampments, etc). Historically, the PIT count was conducted using pen and paper, but CoCs are increasingly adopting mobile and analytics technology like Hyperion and the Counting Us mobile app to make things easier.

A census like this risks undercounting the homeless population for several reasons. Census takers may not encounter some homeless people because they fail to go where those people are. Some homeless people may deny being homeless out of shame or because they fear government retaliation. Homeless people who are temporarily couch-surfing may not come to the attention of census takers. If the census takes place shortly after monthly financial assistance checks go out, some people who are often unsheltered may temporarily be able to afford motel rooms; they may be especially likely to take such a step in winter months when the point-in-time census takes place.

The risk of undercounting can be greatly diminished through the increased utilization of Homelessness Management Information Systems (HMIS) to capture data from people experiencing homelessness who stay in emergency shelters, transitional housing, or safe haven projects. This data can be complemented with data gathered from mobile applications such as Show The Way so that street outreach providers and first responders can collect information from people experiencing unsheltered homelessness throughout the year. Once compiled together, the data from both can be used to generate an accurate "by-name list" of everyone who is experiencing homelessness in a community at any given point-in-time.
