= Whip (tree) =

Slender unbranched shoot or plant

A whip is a slender, unbranched shoot or plant. This term is used typically in forestry to refer to unbranched young tree seedlings of approximately 0.5-1.0 m (1 ft 7 in-3 ft 3 in) in height and 2–3 years old, that have been grown for planting out.
