= Ruth Kirk (author) =

American naturalist, author, and filmographer

Ruth Kirk (1925 – April 19, 2018) was an American naturalist, author of 37 books, and filmographer. Along with her husband, Louis Kirk, she produced a nature-themed series, Kirk's Camera, for PBS, followed by twelve films before Louis Kirk's death in 1992.
