= List of covered bridges in Washington =

There are five authentic covered bridges in the U.S. state of Washington, though none of them are historic. A covered bridge is considered authentic not due to its age, but by its construction. An authentic bridge is constructed using trusses rather than other methods such as stringers, a popular choice for non-authentic covered bridges.

== Extant ==
Name	Image	County	Location	Built	Length	Crosses	Ownership	Truss	Notes
Cedar Creek Covered Bridge		Clark	Woodland; 45°56′18″N 122°35′1″W	1995	83 feet (25 m)	Cedar Creek		Howe	Also called Lynch or Grist Mill Covered Bridge
Grays River Covered Bridge	Grays River Covered Bridge	Wahkiakum	Grays River; 46°21′17″N 123°34′47″W	1905, 1908, 1989	158 feet (48 m)	Grays River	County of Wahkiakum	Howe	
Johnson Covered Bridge		Pierce	Gig Harbor; 47°19′7″N 122°39′46″W	2005	46 feet (14 m)	Whiskey Creek		Howe	
Little Mountain Covered Bridge		Klickitat	Trout Lake; 45°59′29″N 121°29′46″W	1987	60 feet (18 m)	White Salmon River		Howe	Also called Farmgate Homestead and Trout Lake Farm Covered Bridge
Schafer Farm Bridge		Grays Harbor	Montesano; 47°3′47″N 123°31′2″W	1966	72 feet (22 m)	Lagoon	Private	Howe	

== Former ==
Name	Image	County	Location	Built	Length	Crosses	Ownership	Truss	Notes
Doty Bridge		Lewis	Doty	1926	150 feet (46 m)	Chehalis River	Weyerhaeuser Company	Howe	Added to the NRHP in 1982 after attempts to dismantle the bridge, was reported by the state as destroyed in 1990.
Manning-Rye Covered Bridge	Manning-Rye Covered Bridge	Whitman	Colfax; 46°55′42″N 117°24′52″W	ca. 1918	163 feet (50 m)	Palouse River	Private	Howe	Also called Colfax and Road Covered Bridge; burned on September 8, 2020
Weyerhaeuser Pe Ell Bridge		Lewis	Pe Ell	1934		Chehalis River	Weyerhaeuser Company	Howe; pony truss	Added to the NRHP in 1982, was reported by the state as destroyed in 1990. Completely lost during a 2007 flood, a replacement, known as the Tin Bridge, occupies the site.

== See also ==
- List of bridges on the National Register of Historic Places in Washington (state)
- World Guide to Covered Bridges
