= Blanche Pennick =

Washington State politician

Member of the Washington House of Representatives from the 19th district
- In office January 8, 1945 – January 13, 1947 Serving with Chet King
- Preceded by: Archie H. Fairchild; Clyde V. Tisdale
- Succeeded by: Chet King; Ernest R. Leber

Personal details
- Born: December 5, 1905 Melbourne, Washington, U.S.
- Died: September 21, 1991 (aged 85) Montesano, Washington, U.S.
- Party: Democratic
- Education: Bellingham Normal School (now Western Washington University) (teaching certificate); University of Washington (M.A. in education); Stanford University
- Occupation: Teacher

Blanche Pennick (December 5, 1904 – September 21, 1991) was an American politician who served as a member of the Washington House of Representatives from 1945 to 1947. She represented Washington's 19th legislative district as a Democrat. She chaired the Counties and County Boundaries Committee.

Pennick was born in 1905 in Melbourne, Washington (near Montesano) to pioneers John and Catherine Pennick.

She is notable as the plaintiff in a court case decided by the Washington Supreme Court interpreting a provision of the Washington State constitution. Under the constitution, "No member of the legislature during the term for which he is elected shall be appointed or elected to any civil office in the state which shall have been created, or the emoluments of which shall have been increased, during the term for which he was elected." During Pennick's term, the legislature passed a bill to increase the salary of county auditors. Later in the term, Pennick ran for and won the Democratic nomination to be the auditor for Grays Harbor County. The state Supreme Court ultimately ruled that Pennick was ineligible to serve as auditor because of her membership in the legislature that had increased auditors' salaries. (The court overruled that decision in 1966.)

Outside the legislature, she had a 38-year career in education, including working as an education advisor to World Book Encyclopedia in Chicago and serving as Grays Harbor County Superintendent of Schools.
