= Chehalis Western Railroad =

Railroad in Washington, United States

The Chehalis Western Railroad (reporting mark CWWR) was the name of two different shortline railroads that were owned and operated by Weyerhaeuser in Washington state between 1936 and 1993. The first Chehalis Western, which existed from 1936 until 1975, was a shortline Class III railroad, while the second one, which existed from 1981 until 1993, was a private railroad that operated on a different set of lines that Weyerhaeuser had later acquired.

== History ==
In 1936, Weyerhaeuser incorporated the Chehalis Western Railroad as a publicly regulated, common-carrier shortline to carry lumber and forest products over a 10-mile stretch of track from Chehalis, Washington to Ruth, Washington that Weyerhaeuser had purchased from the Chicago, Milwaukee, St. Paul and Pacific Railroad, also known as the Milwaukee Road. The Chehalis Western also operated on trackage rights over the Milwaukee Road from Chehalis to Western Junction, where the trains would join a Weyerhaeuser-owned logging line (known as the "Vail" line) that would go north to a log dump at South Bay, Washington. And Chehalis Western trains also operated on trackage rights over the Northern Pacific Railroad from Pe Ell, Washington to Milburn, Washington. The extinct Doty Bridge, once listed on the National Register of Historic Places, was part of Weyerhaeuser's ownership of the lines through the area.

On December 1, 1975, Weyerhaeuser reorganized the railroad under a new name, the Curtis, Milburn & Eastern Railroad. The CM&E stopped operating on the trackage rights between Pe Ell and Milburn, and the line only operated between Chehalis and Curtis, Washington. The CM&E stopped operating in 1980 and was formally abandoned in February 1993.

The Chehalis Western Railroad name was resurrected in 1980, when the Milwaukee Road abandoned all of its trackage west of Miles City, Montana. At that point, Weyerhaeuser acquired all of the Milwaukee Road's trackage south of Tacoma, Washington, except for some trackage rights. The lines that Weyerhaeuser purchased measured <23 miles long and were the Milwaukee Road's routes from Tacoma to Chehalis and from Frederickson, Washington to Morton, Washington. In order to service the new lines, Weyerhaeuser purchased four brand-new EMD GP38-2 locomotives.

When the new Chehalis Western assumed operation of the Milwaukee Road tracks, operation of the Curtis, Milburn and Eastern trackage was resumed under the CWWR name. Curtis was used as a log reload yard and loads were daily (Monday through Friday) brought to Western Junction. Vail, WA was the other reload point and those loads were daily brought to Western Junction as well. The loads then would be combined and brought to Port of Tacoma. In the latter part of the 1980s, Curtis was converted to a pole yard where power poles from a nearby mill were sorted and then loaded to railcars. These pole loads would then be brought to an interchange point in Chehalis with the Union Pacific Railway. Subsequently, the only remaining log reload point was at Vail. Only 42 carloads of raw logs were hauled in daily Monday through Friday to Tacoma after the conversion of the Curtis reload. This practice remained until operations were ceased in 1992.

Sometime in the early 1980s or before, the South Bay operation was discontinued and the tracks were removed from Western Junction to the end of the line at South Bay.

Although Weyerhauser did purchase the Morton subdivision of the Milwaukee Road from Fredrickson, WA to Morton WA, no operations were ever begun on this segment. And this was despite the fact they spent a sizeable sum to replace a rather large bridge that had burned in 1979 near Eatonville, WA that crosses the Little Mishael River over a rather deep canyon. Only the Mt. Rainier Scenic Railroad ever operated trains on an 8-mile segment between Elbe, WA and Mineral, WA during the time between the Milwaukee Road abandonment and the acquisition of the CWWR assets by the City of Tacoma in 1995. Subsequently, much of the Morton Subdivision fell into disrepair that had not been used, but was revitalized by the City of Tacoma after they had acquired it.

In July 1992, Weyerhaeuser shut down the second incarnation of the Chehalis Western.

In 1995, Weyerhaeuser sold the entire railroad to the city of Tacoma for $3.1 million. At that point, the city contracted with the Tacoma Eastern Railway to begin operations on the line, and then contracted with Tacoma Rail to operate the trackage. In addition, the city of Tacoma began allowing two excursion railroads to operate over portions of the line: the Chehalis–Centralia Railroad, which now operates from Chehalis west to Ruth, Washington (and as a result, operates on the now-restored tracks of the first Chehalis Western Railroad), and the 7-mile Mount Rainier Scenic Railroad, which operates between Tacoma and Morton.

Today, the Chehalis Western Trail is a bike trail that uses a portion of the "Vail" logging line that the Chehalis Western would travel over to South Bay, in the vicinity of Lacey, Washington.
