= Medcalf =

Medcalf is a surname. Notable people with the surname include:

- Francis Henry Medcalf (1803–1880), Canadian politician
- Ian Medcalf (1918–2011), Australian politician
- James Medcalf (1895–1980), English footballer
- J. T. Medcalf (1843–1899), American politician
- Kim Medcalf (born 1973), British actress and singer
- Robert Medcalf (1887–1963), Australian politician
- Stephen Medcalf (academic) (1936–2007), British academic
- Stephen Medcalf (director) (born 1958), British stage director

== See also ==
- Metcalfe (disambiguation)
