= List of lakes of Saline County, Arkansas =

There are at least 52 named lakes and reservoirs in Saline County, Arkansas.

== Lakes ==
- Dotted Lake, 34°30′25″N 092°36′12″W, el. 259 feet (79 m)
- Dotty Lake, 34°31′42″N 092°29′24″W, el. 472 feet (144 m)
- Masoner Lake, 34°33′36″N 092°43′02″W, el. 328 feet (100 m)

== Reservoirs ==
- 4-H Camp Lake, 34°38′45″N 092°34′11″W, el. 446 feet (136 m)
- Alcoa Water Supply, 34°34′09″N 092°32′20″W, el. 381 feet (116 m)
- Barr Lake, 34°28′54″N 092°44′01″W, el. 427 feet (130 m)
- Bloomfield Lake, 34°36′00″N 092°21′19″W, el. 335 feet (102 m)
- Brown Lake, 34°48′18″N 092°46′43″W, el. 577 feet (176 m)
- Buffington Lake, 34°31′18″N 092°42′37″W, el. 449 feet (137 m)
- Caldwell Lake, 34°36′21″N 092°31′33″W, el. 390 feet (120 m)
- Cecil Jones Lake, 34°36′28″N 092°36′38″W, el. 354 feet (108 m)
- Clear Lake, 34°34′24″N 092°22′23″W, el. 305 feet (93 m)
- Crystal Lake, 34°41′12″N 092°30′42″W, el. 449 feet (137 m)
- Dawson Lake, 34°29′09″N 092°44′07″W, el. 410 feet (120 m)
- Ferguson Lake, 34°32′16″N 092°16′35″W, el. 239 feet (73 m)
- Hansen Lake, 34°47′07″N 092°48′46″W, el. 627 feet (191 m)
- Happy Valley Lake, 34°45′13″N 092°34′53″W, el. 522 feet (159 m)
- Helmich Lake, 34°39′38″N 092°35′06″W, el. 469 feet (143 m)
- Hester Lake, 34°31′46″N 092°19′06″W, el. 272 feet (83 m)
- Hester Lake, 34°40′03″N 092°31′51″W, el. 482 feet (147 m)
- Holding Pond Number Two Reservoir, 34°32′13″N 092°31′59″W, el. 289 feet (88 m)
- Hurricane Lake, 34°37′14″N 092°32′01″W, el. 410 feet (120 m)
- Indian Springs Lake, 34°37′23″N 092°28′55″W, el. 374 feet (114 m)
- Inman Lake Number Two, 34°43′56″N 092°34′17″W, el. 541 feet (165 m)
- King Lake, 34°35′06″N 092°23′19″W, el. 335 feet (102 m)
- Lake Coronado, 34°39′16″N 092°57′56″W, el. 630 feet (190 m)
- Lake Cortez, 34°40′51″N 092°58′41″W, el. 636 feet (194 m)
- Lake Estrella, 34°38′18″N 092°51′17″W, el.
- Lake Granada, 34°38′46″N 092°50′58″W, el. 495 feet (151 m)
- Lake Isabella, 34°37′29″N 092°52′13″W, el. 456 feet (139 m)
- Lake Krislor, 34°29′48″N 092°43′19″W, el. 466 feet (142 m)
- Lake Lago, 34°40′40″N 092°56′49″W, el. 636 feet (194 m)
- Lake Maria, 34°37′41″N 092°50′53″W, el. 476 feet (145 m)
- Lake New Moon, 34°45′04″N 092°36′03″W, el. 518 feet (158 m)
- Lake Norrell, 34°43′06″N 092°38′47″W, el. 404 feet (123 m)
- Lake Pauline, 34°34′54″N 092°33′35″W, el. 371 feet (113 m)
- Lake Sylvia, 34°38′01″N 092°50′59″W, el. 476 feet (145 m)
- Lake Winona, 34°48′24″N 092°52′11″W, el. 741 feet (226 m)
- Ledbetter Lake, 34°36′43″N 092°31′04″W, el. 394 feet (120 m)
- Maertins Lake, 34°39′20″N 092°35′17″W, el. 440 feet (130 m)
- Mary Lake, 34°32′12″N 092°20′25″W, el. 312 feet (95 m)
- Mashburn Lake Number One, 34°33′06″N 092°21′55″W, el. 354 feet (108 m)
- Mashburn Lake Number Two, 34°33′27″N 092°21′51″W, el. 315 feet (96 m)
- Old Brown Mud Lakes, 34°32′38″N 092°28′44″W, el. 423 feet (129 m)
- Parker Lake, 34°36′11″N 092°22′00″W, el. 318 feet (97 m)
- Pathway Youth Camp Lake, 34°29′25″N 092°43′46″W, el. 453 feet (138 m)
- Pebble Lake, 34°37′02″N 092°32′46″W, el. 413 feet (126 m)
- Spring Lake, 34°32′14″N 092°19′21″W, el. 262 feet (80 m)
- Styres Lake, 34°36′54″N 092°22′49″W, el. 344 feet (105 m)
- Surge Pond, 34°34′42″N 092°28′35″W, el. 381 feet (116 m)
- Timber Lake, 34°33′05″N 092°31′46″W, el. 322 feet (98 m)
- Wise Lake, 34°33′00″N 092°38′01″W, el. 367 feet (112 m)

== See also ==
- List of lakes in Arkansas
