= Chet King =

American politician

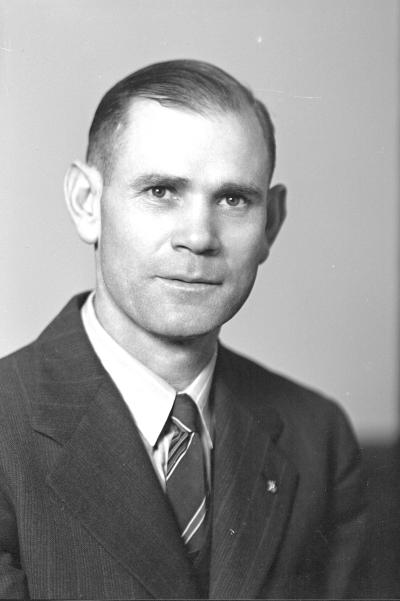
- King in 1947

Member of the Washington House of Representatives for the 19th district
- In office 1945–1967

Personal details
- Born: December 4, 1901 Doty, Washington, United States
- Died: December 2, 1981 (aged 79) Hillsboro, Washington, United States
- Party: Democratic

Dea Chester King (December 4, 1901 – December 2, 1981) was an American politician in the state of Washington. He served in the Washington House of Representatives from 1945 to 1967.
