= Holy Cross Polish National Catholic Church =

Extinct historic church in Washington, United States

- U.S. National Register of Historic Places
- Washington State Heritage Register
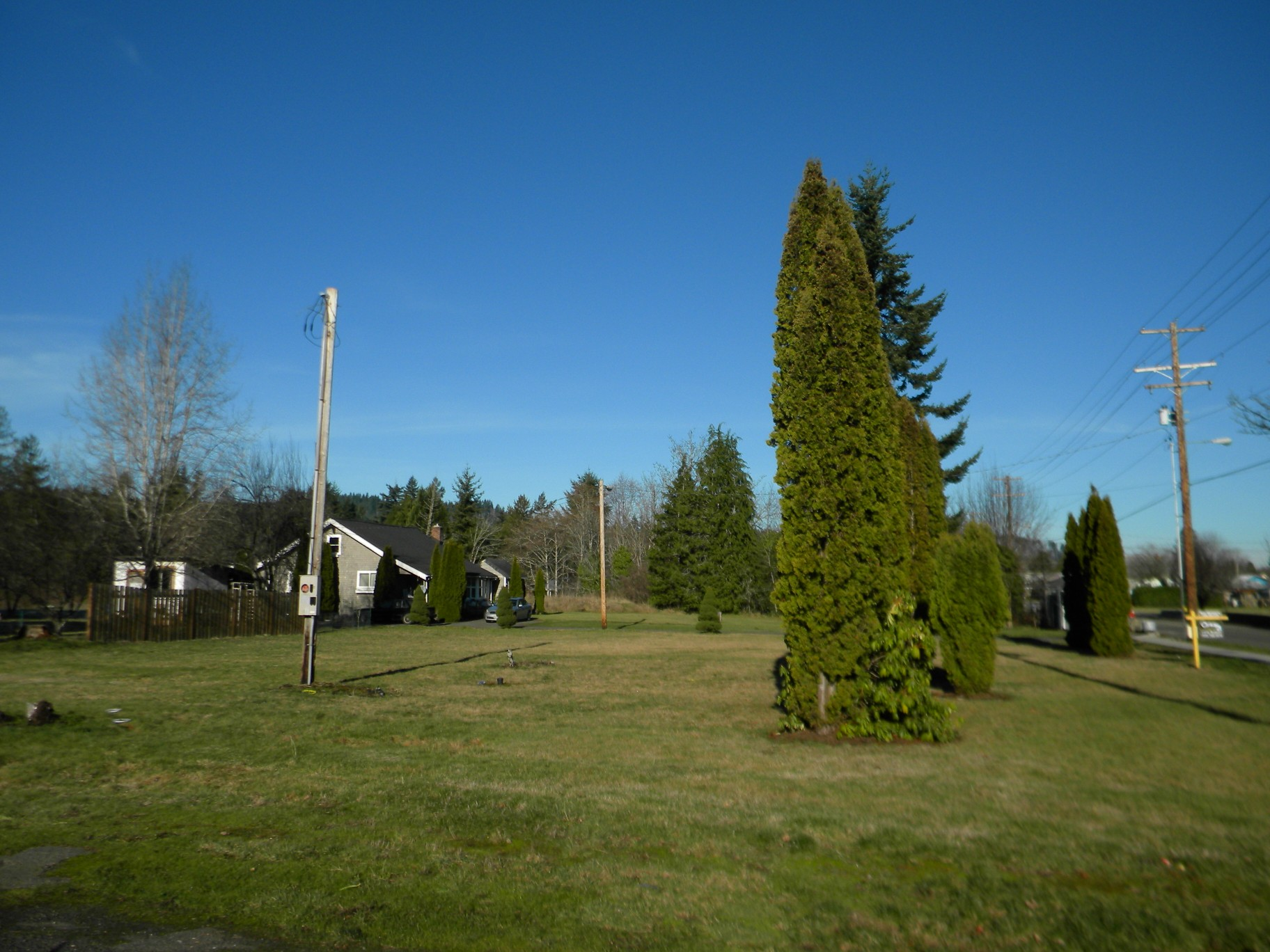
- Prior grounds of the Holy Cross Polish National Catholic Church, 2015

- Location within Washington (state) Location within the United States
- Location: Third and Queen, Pe Ell, Washington
- Coordinates: 46°34′4″N 123°17′57″W
- Area: less than one acre
- Built: 1916
- Built by: Polish-American community of Pe Ell
- Architectural style: Late Gothic Revival
- Demolished: March 2010
- NRHP reference No.: 87001456

Significant dates
- Added to NRHP: September 2, 1987
- Designated WSHR: September 2, 1987

Holy Cross Polish National Catholic Church was a historic Polish National Catholic Church (PNCC) at Third and Queen in Pe Ell, Washington. The parish was the first PNCC church organized and constructed in Washington state, and was one of a few of such type in the Western United States. The structure was added to the National Register of Historic Places in 1987.

The Polish-American community in the town started a new congregation after feeling an original Catholic church was no longer meeting their cultural needs. Organized, constructed, and dedicated in 1916, the church was in the architectural style of Late Gothic Revival and featured two symmetrical bell towers at the main entrance, Gothic windows, a barrel vault ceiling, and hand-carved altarpieces.

The congregation, historically small but open to any person of Polish or Lithuanian ancestry, weathered declining membership, funding, and a closure during the Great Depression. Reopening under Episcopal ministry in the late 1930s, the church remained active as a Polish cultural parish but a repeat decline of membership began in the 1960s. By the late 1980s, attendance was sparse, and despite a brief increase the following decade, the church waned further. The last liturgical services were held at the turn of the 21st century.

Items within the church were sold during the 2000s to help raise funds to maintain the structure. Continuing funding difficulties and declining membership led the building to fall into decay. The church, despite some opposition and remaining in a mostly unaltered state, was demolished in full by March 2010. Holy Cross Polish National Catholic Church was the last remaining Polish National Catholic church in the state.

== History ==
Polish and Swiss immigrants, who had come to Pe Ell to work in the local lumber industry, built Saint Joseph Roman Catholic church in 1892. A larger Roman Catholic church was constructed in 1902. The congregation was served by a priest of Polish descent, Michael Fafara, until 1903. A subsequent appointed pastor, Bernard Korke, was not of Polish heritage and the Polish Catholic community, feeling their cultural needs unmet, requested the formation of a new parish under the Polish National Catholic Church (PNCC).

The congregation, beginning from a meeting in a house in 1914, organized on April 8, 1916 and was to be open to all people of Polish or Lithuanian ancestry. The Holy Cross Polish National Catholic Church was constructed and dedicated the same year, built using local labor and materials by the Polish immigrant community under guidance of parishioners, Andrew Krasniak and John Trzesniowski. The new church formally affiliated with the PNCC in 1918. Approximately 200 families joined the church. Early priests included Father Peter Parzychowski, who initially served, and Joseph Foltynski who led the congregation between 1918 and 1922; neither were formally ordained. Responsibility was given to Pastor John Toporowski, who served into 1930. The church community constructed a Polish National Catholic cemetery in Pe Ell next to the St. Joseph Church cemetery.

The congregation, comparable to other cultural-organized churches in the town, retained its Polish identity and was an amalgam of Polish religious traditions and that of American Protestant practices. Church by-laws were written to allow any person of Polish or Lithuanian ancestry, or had a spouse of such heritage, to join the Holy Cross parish. Unusual inclusions in the rules, those that did not follow standard Roman Catholic church practices or standards of the time, included the ability of the congregation to dismiss the parish priest by vote, that the church deed was owned by the parish council, and financial responsibility given to the council and not the pastor.

=== Decline ===
At the onset of the Great Depression, coupled with financial hardships of the town and declining church membership, the parish was without an appointed priest beginning in 1930 as the pastor was transferred; council member Peter Kus was credited with keeping the church active and open. The church was closed until 1936 due to difficulties in having funds available to pay for a minister. By 1938-1939, (Note: Competing historical accounts mention either 1938 or 1939 as to when church services were restarted at Holy Cross during the Great Depression.) regular liturgical services were restarted as Episcopal priests from the region, including from Chehalis, began serving the congregation, doing so until 1979. (Note: The year Episcopal priests began serving at Holy Cross is often reported as beginning in 1953 in later reports. See sources throughout the article for the discrepancy.)

The ability for an Episcopal pastor to lead the Polish congregation was due to a 1930s "concordat of intercommunication" between the PNCC and the Episcopal Church, recognizing the similarities in beliefs and practices between the two religious organizations. Though services began using the Episcopal prayer book and were conducted under the English language, vestments and the architecture of the church remained unchanged. The church remained active throughout the 1950s but a decline in membership was noted to begin in the 1960s. A "priest-in-charge", Reverend Richard W. Garlich, was elevated to the position of archdeacon in 1969 while leading the parish. Old Catholic priests from Portland, Oregon served the congregation from 1979 until 1985.

At the time of the National Register of Historic Places nomination in 1987, it was noted that a "handful" of Polish-American families in Pe Ell were still attending monthly services. Services had dwindled to such low numbers that by the early 1990s, the church was only open for meetings and weddings. A Polish-speaking priest was appointed to the congregation in 1995 and membership grew from less than ten attendees at mass to as many as 25. By approximately 2000, the last, consistent liturgical service was held as the issues of low membership and funding continued.

As congregation activity dwindled, and funding to keep the building in working order needed, artifacts within the church were sold, including placing items on consignment at a town antique store. Parish property included the church's 100-year bible and an original pipe organ.

=== Demolition ===
The structure's condition deteriorated and the Holy Cross Polish National Catholic Church was demolished; the final efforts of removal were completed the first week of March 2010. The ground was tilled and the only remaining structure on the property, still under the ownership of the Holy Cross Diocese, was a rectory. Opposition to the demolition noted concerns over a loss of local history, including the religious and cultural importance the church had to Pe Ell, and that the building could have been saved by renovation efforts, the decay not as calamitous as thought.

The church was the last Polish National Catholic church in Washington until its demolition.

== Geography ==
The church was located at the intersection of Queen Avenue and Third Street in a residential neighborhood within Pe Ell, Washington.

== Architecture and features ==
The church's listing on the National Register of Historic Places (NRHP) additionally includes both lots on which the church was located. Unless otherwise noted, the details provided are based on the 1987 National Register of Historic Places (NRHP) nomination form and may not reflect updates or changes to the Holy Cross Polish National Catholic Church's existence until its demolition in 2010.

The one-story structure was of vernacular architecture following Late Gothic Revival design. Built of fir, the church measured 50 ft × 150 ft (15 m × 46 m) in size. Constructed over a wood post-and-pier foundation, the timber-framed church featured twin bell towers at its front corners, rising flush from the front façade.

At the time of the church's NRHP nomination, the structure was noted to retain its "outstanding interior and exterior quality".

=== Exterior ===
The exterior was sheathed with narrow, beveled siding; non-front facing walls of the towers were cladded in cedar shingles. The overall shape of the structure was rectangular but showcased a front entrance wall with a gable roof, giving the appearance of a two-story structure. The towers flanked the gable providing a structural symmetry; the towers were square, with a roof of octagonal spires and extended eaves, each topped with a wooden cross. The north tower housed a cast iron bell original to the church, manufactured by American Bell Foundry Company of Northfield, Michigan.

Paneled double-doors on the front façade was the main entryway into the church. The entrance contained a fanlight and was situated under a slightly protruding pediment portico. Above the door were three Gothic-style arched sash windows, with projecting sills, that provided light to the interior balcony. On the same plane, matching windows adorned the towers, which also included louvers for ventilation. Six similar windows were placed on each side wall of the church. Providing additional ventilation to the church attic was an oculus located at the gable peak. The back wall featured a polygonal apse.

Simple trim, including at the cornices and corners, separated the front wall from the roofline. The spires of the tower began at the height of the gable peak.

=== Interior ===
A small vestibule existed at the main entrance leading to the main auditorium of the church. A choir loft rested above the main entrance into the nave, supported by pillars. The choir space was enclosed at some point in the mid-20th century for use as an office. A barrel vault ceiling existed over the central aisle of the nave; side aisles had a flat ceiling supported by wooden pillars. The Gothic windows were trimmed in simple molding and the walls in the nave was narrow tongue-and-groove siding. The sanctuary, containing a pulpit, was on a raised platform that contained a separating altar rail and an apse in the rear portion of the section. The semicircular recess featured an ornate, hand-carved altarpiece and two side altarpieces. The carved tabernacle was noted for its similarity to such altarpieces in rural Poland. A sacristy and storage room flanked the sanctuary space.

A pump organ of historical note was reported to remain at the time of the church's historic listing.

== Significance ==
The Holy Cross Polish National Catholic Church was noted by the National Register of Historic Places (NRHP) nomination for its historic connection to the Polish communities in Pe Ell and other logging towns within Lewis County, Washington. Additionally, Polish-Americans of Pe Ell were recognized for helping to develop a national Polish church in the state, forming a "unique American blend" between their culture and the customs of their church.

At the time of the historic designation, the NRHP noted that the Holy Cross Church was the only Polish National Catholic house of worship in both Washington state and the Pacific Northwest, and one of only a few in Western United States.

The church, due to its altarpieces, structural integrity, towers, vaulted ceilings, and Gothic Revival architecture, was added to the National Register of Historic Places and Washington State Heritage Register on September 2, 1987.
