= Doty Bridge =

Extinct NRHP-listed site in Chehalis, Washington

- Coordinates: 46°38′05″N 123°16′58″W
- Crosses: Chehalis River
- Locale: Doty, Washington
- Heritage status: NRHP (delisted)

Characteristics
- Design: Howe truss
- Material: Timber
- Total length: 150 feet (46 m)
- Width: 22 feet (6.7 m)
- Height: 29.5 feet (9.0 m)

History
- Construction start: 1924
- Construction end: 1926
- Construction cost: $23,000
- Closed: 1990
- Doty Bridge
- Formerly listed on the U.S. National Register of Historic Places
- Washington State Heritage Register
- Location within Washington (state)
- Area: less than one acre
- Built: 1926
- Built by: Chicago, Milwaukee, St. Paul and Pacific Railroad
- Architectural style: Howe truss
- Demolished: 1990
- MPS: Historic Bridges/Tunnels in Washington state
- NRHP reference No.: 82004260 (Note: As of 2024, the Doty Bridge NRHP file has not been digitized. Please review the delisted NRHP form.)

Significant dates
- Added to NRHP: July 16, 1982
- Designated WSHR: November 7, 1979
- Removed from NRHP: July 16, 1990

Location
- Interactive map of Doty Bridge

The Doty Bridge was a covered bridge located in Doty, Washington, United States. A replacement for an earlier bridge, it was previously listed on the National Register of Historic Places (NRHP) in 1982. The Doty Bridge was removed eight years later in 1990 after the structure was reported by the state as having been destroyed.

The 150 foot (46 metres) truss bridge was constructed beginning in 1924 and completed by January 1926. The timber built, covered crossing, which spanned the Chehalis River, protected a railroad track used by several rail companies in the region. By the late 1960s, the bridge was disconnected from rail use and eventually fell into disrepair by the mid-1970s. Several attempts were made to either dismantle or save the bridge. Neither option commenced and the span continued to deteriorate. The Doty Bridge was considered the last covered railroad bridge in the state.

== History ==
An existing rail line existed over the Chehalis River in Doty in 1914. The Doty Bridge began as a replacement of the span, part of the Raymond-Willapa Harbor line, in July 1924. The $23,000 bridge was fully covered and completed by January 1926. Railroad companies, such as the Milwaukee Road and the Chehalis Western Railroad used the line through the bridge, often shipping timber for Weyerhaeuser Company. The bridge came under Weyerhaeuser ownership after purchasing the retired right of way in 1936. Weyerhaeuser used the line under the bridge during its logging operations at Camp McDonald, west of Boistfort.

The Doty Bridge was one of several covered bridges in Lewis County, such as the Weyerhaeuser Pe Ell Bridge. Some of the last to remain was a span over the Newaukum River near Alexander Park, which was removed in 1958, and a crossing at Curtis that was replaced with a steel girder bridge in 1975.

The Doty Bridge was considered to be in good condition but was disconnected by Weyerhaeuser from the rail line by 1965; part of the railroad track was still in use by 1969. By 1976, deterioration of the side walls and roof were noted; the frame was regarded to be in "real good condition". The timber company asked for the bridge to be dismantled due to safety concerns and a railroad materials company that owned the bridge structure was prepared to remove the structure. Demolition was paused after concerns were noted by local residents and historians that the bridge could be preserved for its historical significance. Before the bridge's acceptance to the National Register of Historic Places, one proposed plan in early 1976 was to move the assembly to the Southwest Washington Fairgrounds, where it was considered for use as a footbridge over Salzer Creek, connecting a parking lot to the grounds. The relocation was estimated to cost as high as $50,000.

The attempts to save the bridge in 1976 failed by July of that year and orders were given to officially remove the bridge. The final rail connection was removed, people were strongly urged not to walk under through the structure due to continuing decay, and a portion of the bridge was noted to be "leaning badly". Restoration was ruled out as "impractical".

The bridge, however, remained and was listed with the NRHP in 1982, only to be noted as destroyed by 1990.

== Architecture and engineering ==
Built of timber, the Howe truss was 150 feet (45.7 m) long with a width of 22 feet (6.7 m). It was measured to be 29.5 feet (9.0 m) tall. The structure was a standard design, free from embellishments, of the Milwaukee Road. The bridge was considered "stark" and "utilitarian", similar to that of the Weyerhaeuser Pe Ell Bridge. Covered bridges were used as a cost-saving measure, protecting untreated railroad ties which were used due to the high cost of creosote during the 1920s and 1930s.

== Significance ==
In 1976, the Doty Bridge was believed to be the last remaining railroad covered bridge in Washington and by 1979, was one of four covered bridges of any use remaining in the state. It was regarded as the last example of a Chicago, Milwaukee, St. Paul and Pacific Railroad-designed bridge in the state.

During the 1976 attempt to demolish the bridge, the Lewis County Historical Society expressed concerns over the possible loss, but noted that a lack of preservation funds, coupled with other areas and buildings considered to be of higher merit, meant that the Doty Bridge would have to be preserved by other avenues. The railroad materials company offered to sell the structure for $1,500. A manager of the fairgrounds remarked that there was a lack of appreciation for the span's importance noting that as time passed, "perhaps they'll wish they had saved it."

The Doty Bridge remained and was added to the NRHP on July 16, 1982. Prior to the historic designation, the landmark was listed to the Washington State Heritage Register on November 7, 1979.

=== Delisting ===
The Doty Bridge was formally delisted on July 16, 1990 after a letter from the Washington State Department of Archaeology and Historic Preservation days prior informed the NRHP that the structure had been destroyed.
