= J. T. Medcalf =

American politician

Member of the Washington House of Representatives
- In office 1889–1891

Personal details
- Born: June 13, 1843 near Montreal, Canada East
- Died: May 22, 1899 (aged 55) Montesano, Washington, United States
- Party: Republican

John T. Medcalf (June 13, 1843 – May 22, 1899) was an American politician in the state of Washington. He served in the Washington House of Representatives from 1889 to 1891.
