= Weyerhaeuser Pe Ell Bridge =

Extinct NRHP-listed site in Chehalis, Washington

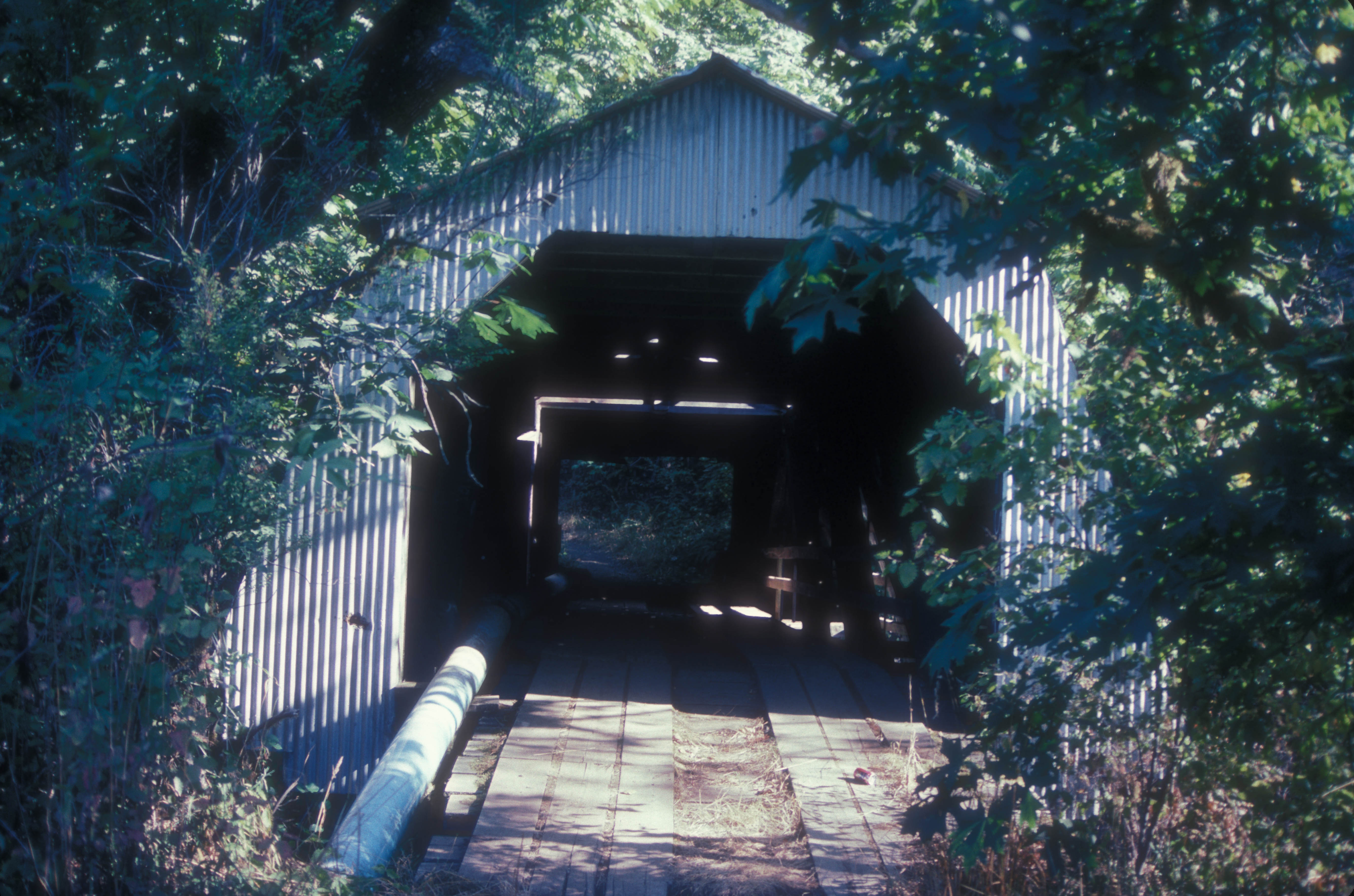
- The NRHP-listed covered bridge in Pe Ell, Washington
- Coordinates: 46°32′43″N 123°17′55″W
- Crossed: Chehalis River
- Locale: Pe Ell, Washington
- Other name: Tin Bridge
- Heritage status: NRHP (delisted)

Characteristics
- Design: Howe truss
- Material: Timber
- Total length: 93 feet (28.3 m)
- Longest span: 63 feet (19.2 m)
- No. of spans: 1

History
- Construction start: 1934
- Construction end: 1934
- Collapsed: 2007
- Closed: 1990
- Weyerhaeuser Pe Ell Bridge
- Formerly listed on the U.S. National Register of Historic Places
- Location within Washington (state)
- Area: less than one acre
- Built: 1934
- Built by: Pe Ell water department
- Architect: James Donahue
- Architectural style: Covered Howe truss; pony truss
- Demolished: 1990; 2007
- MPS: Historic Bridges/Tunnels in Washington state
- NRHP reference No.: 82004261 (Note: As of 2024, the Weyerhaeuser Pe Ell Bridge NRHP file has not been digitized. Please review the delisted NRHP form.)

Significant dates
- Added to NRHP: July 16, 1982
- Removed from NRHP: July 16, 1990

Location
- Interactive map of Weyerhaeuser Pe Ell Bridge

The Weyerhaeuser Pe Ell Bridge was a covered bridge built in 1934 and located over the Chehalis River near Pe Ell, Washington. The bridge was listed on the National Register of Historic Places (NRHP) in 1982 but delisted in 1990 after the state reported that the bridge was destroyed.

The bridge, however, remained though it had suffered deterioration and some loss of use. The historic structure was eventually destroyed due to rushing waters during flooding caused by the Great Coastal Gale of 2007. The crossing, mostly for use as a footpath and as a means to house a water line to the town, was replaced in the following years. The new bridge, continuing to house the water main, is given the moniker, the Tin Bridge.

The Weyerhaeuser Pe Ell Bridge was a timber, truss bridge that spanned 63 feet (19.2 m) in length. It was considered utilitarian in appearance, covered in locally purchased corrugated metal sheathing. The bridge, at the time of its destruction, was the only existing covered pony truss bridge remaining in the state.

== History ==
In November 1903, the town of Pe Ell began to be supplied by a water pipe from Weyerhaeuser timber holdings that crossed over a deep canyon of the Chehalis River. Under management of the Washington Light and Water System Company, the supply line was supported by a wire cable. Pe Ell took ownership of the water line in 1923, and residents voted in 1933 to build the Weyerhaeuser Pe Ell Bridge after repairs and upgrades to the existing system were deemed necessary.

The bridge was built in 1934 by the Pe Ell water department as a means to provide water to the town via a 10 in (25 cm) pipe within the bridge. The construction was overseen by James Donahoe, a superintendent of the water department. Although used for foot traffic, the bridge's main purpose was to supply water to the town, which continued unabated at the time of its NRHP nomination.

The bridge was listed by the state as destroyed in 1990 however the bridge has been reported as intact at the time of the 2001 Nisqually earthquake. Structural damage caused by the earthquake was suspected but unseen, and the water pipe shifted. Further, the bridge remained extant in 2005 when a partial collapse was noted of the northern approach, which was due to an impact event with an all-terrain vehicle. The bank on the northern side had eroded, allowing only pedestrian access.

The span was permanently destroyed during flooding caused by the Great Coastal Gale of 2007. The Chehalis River in the Pe Ell area rose 50 feet (15.2 m) during the event, overcoming the historic site and wrecking the water main. Estimated costs to repair the pipe system, which had been replaced in 2004, reached $800,000. An additional $500,000 was assessed for the bridge. The financial cost of the loss of the bridge and the water supply led the Pe Ell community to consider dissolving the town's government. The remaining pieces of the bridge were required to be retrieved as it was part of the grant to restore the crossing, with the intent to use as many parts of the original Weyerhaeuser Pe Ell Bridge as possible.

=== Tin Bridge ===
In 2002, the Tin Bridge replacement project received $400,000 from the Historic Covered Bridge Preservation Program overseen by the Federal Highway Administration, one of just eight sites in the nation to be accepted for the grant. Lewis County began a request for bids to either repair the site or build a new bridge in July 2004 and by the following year, the Tin Bridge Restoration Project had been formed.

After the 2007 flood, the replacement project was budgeted at $407,000 and was given by Lewis County to the town as a no-interest loan. In 2009, the county granted $85,000 from a distressed fund account to help offset the repair costs associated with the water system. By 2013, the Pe Ell government reimbursed the county for approximately $159,000 to cover the cost of the bridge project as part of the loan agreement based on the town receiving funding from the Federal Emergency Management Agency (FEMA). The bridge restoration had become a FEMA project and was no longer covered under the Historic Covered Bridge Preservation grant.

As of 2024, the rebuilt bridge, known as the Tin Bridge, spans the Upper Chehalis River crossing. The site has been a planned location of a dam, proposed under the Chehalis River Basin Flood Authority and fellow partnerships, to control flooding in the Chehalis Valley.

== Architecture and engineering ==
The Weyerhaeuser Pe Ell Bridge was described as a short-spanned timber Howe pony truss measuring 63 feet (19.2 m) long with wood plank approaches adding an additional 30 feet (9.1 m) to the length of the span. Built in six panels, the siding and roof was sheathed in corrugated metal which was procured during its build at a local hardware store. The crossing was engineered lacking a diagonal cross brace. Two steel vertical rods were used for tension support. Both the deck and pilings were made of timber. It was considered lacking in "aesthetic appeal" noted in other covered bridges in the Pacific Northwest and described as "stark" and "utilitarian", similar to that of the Doty Bridge. The water main was originally made of wood, which existed until a replacement of the system in 2004.

The year 1934 was placed on the exterior with nailed, metal numbers. The construction year was also written on the interior corrugated sheathing.

== Geography ==
The original bridge spanned a section of the Chehalis River, approximately 200 feet (61.0 m) deep, at a location roughly 2 miles (3.2 km) south of the Pe Ell community.

== Significance ==
The bridge was added to the National Register of Historic Places on July 16, 1982. At the time of its nomination, it was recognized as one of only four covered bridges remaining in Washington and the only existing covered pony truss span in the state. Its significance was implied to be "exceptional" and the age of the bridge to be a notable factor.

=== Delisting ===
The Weyerhaeuser Pe Ell Bridge was formally delisted on July 16, 1990, after a letter from the Washington State Department of Archaeology and Historic Preservation days prior informed the NRHP that the structure had been destroyed.
