= Montesano, Washington =

City in Washington, United States

- City
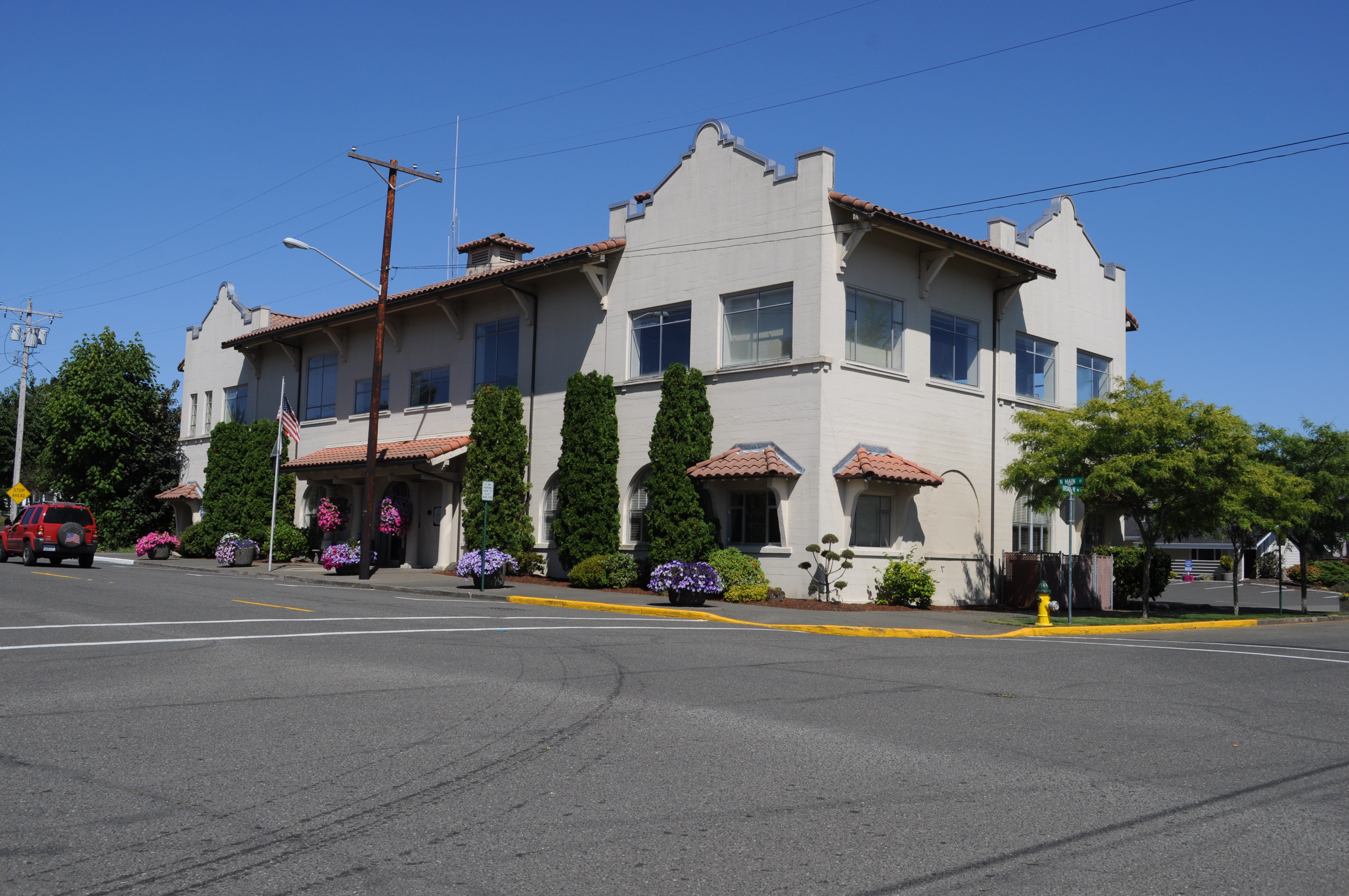
- City hall on North Main Street
- Interactive location map of Montesano
- Coordinates: 46°59′39″N 123°36′12″W
- Country: United States
- State: Washington
- County: Grays Harbor
- Incorporated: November 26, 1883

Government
  - Type: Mayor–council
  - Mayor: Tyler Trimble

Area
  - Total: 10.54 sq mi (27.30 km^{2})
  - Land: 10.38 sq mi (26.89 km^{2})
  - Water: 0.15 sq mi (0.40 km^{2})
- Elevation: 318 ft (97 m)

Population (2020)
  - Total: 4,138
  - Estimate (2024): 4,194
  - Density: 390.2/sq mi (150.67/km^{2})
- Time zone: UTC-8 (Pacific (PST))
  - Summer (DST): UTC-7 (PDT)
- ZIP Code: 98563
- Area code: 360, 564
- FIPS code: 53-46895
- GNIS feature ID: 2411147
- Website: cityofmontesano.com

Montesano is a city in and the county seat of Grays Harbor County, Washington, United States. The population was 4,138 at the 2020 census.

== History ==
=== Medcalf Prairie ===
According to Edwin Van Syckle, a portion of the present-day town of Montesano was first platted in 1870 by Samuel Henry Williams, who purchased land in what was known as Wedcalf Prairie, named after the early settler William Medcalf. At about the same time, surveyor Charles Newton Byles bought a farm from Walter King on the present-day site of Montesano on April 9, 1870, and later platted three blocks on the west side of Main Street. The town of Montesano was born, but it was not incorporated until November 26, 1883, by the Washington Territorial Legislature.

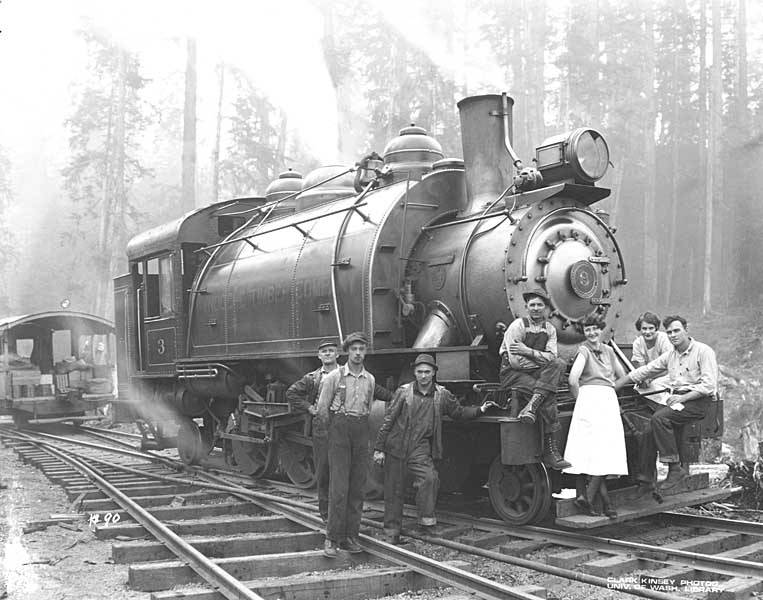
A lumber company's locomotive in Montesano, c. 1921

=== South Montesano ===
Prior to that time, the name Montesano was used to refer to the homestead of Isaiah Lancaster Scammon and his wife Lorinda. They filed a 640-acre Donation Land Claim on January 15, 1853, on the Chehalis River, opposite the mouth of the Wynoochee River, in the area now referred to as South Montesano. The Scammon home was often referred to as "Scammon's Landing" or "Scammon's Hotel", because it was an important stopping point along the Chehalis River for early pioneers, and the furthest up-river mooring point and railroad junction for seagoing ships.

According to Edmond S. Meany, in 1860 the seat of what was then called Chehalis County was moved to "the place of J.L. Scammons". Mrs. Lorinda Scammon was very religious and wished to have the place named "Mount Zion". Another early settler, Samuel James, suggested "Montesano", which was derived from Spanish meaning "mountain of health"; it was said that this had a more pleasant sound and meant about the same. The suggestion was approved, and soon after, a post office was secured with the name "Montesano". The people of Chehalis County voted to move the county seat to the platted town of Montesano in 1886, and the Scammon home was then known as South Montesano.

=== 21st century ===
In 2012, a man calling himself Michael Thomas entered the county courthouse where he struggled with a deputy sheriff, shooting her in the shoulder with her own gun. He also stabbed in the neck a judge trying to assist the deputy. Later identified as Steven Daniel Kravetz, the assailant was convicted on assault charges and acquitted of attempted murder.

== Geography ==
Montesano is on the north slope of the Chehalis River valley, near the confluence of the Wynoochee River and Chehalis River. The town is bordered on the north by Lake Sylvia and on the west by Sylvia Creek.

According to the United States Census Bureau, the city has a total area of 10.58 square miles (27.40 km^{2}), of which 10.41 square miles (26.96 km^{2}) are land and 0.17 square miles (0.44 km^{2}) are water.

=== Climate ===
This region experiences warm (but not hot) and relatively dry summers, with no average monthly temperatures above 71.6 °F (22 °C) and very wet autumns and springs due to the maritime winds. According to the Köppen Climate Classification system, Montesano is in a region of oceanic climate, abbreviated Cfb on climate maps due to frequent summer rainfall, even though there is a significant drying trend during that season. The summer highs are hotter than in Aberdeen courtesy of its inland position. This also renders frequent but most often minor frosts in winter, with the climate retaining a significant maritime influence.

Climate data for Montesano
Month	Jan	Feb	Mar	Apr	May	Jun	Jul	Aug	Sep	Oct	Nov	Dec	Year
Record high °F (°C)	58 (14)	61 (16)	78 (26)	82 (28)	97 (36)	95 (35)	102 (39)	96 (36)	94 (34)	83 (28)	75 (24)	60 (16)	102 (39)
Mean daily maximum °F (°C)	41.8 (5.4)	45.8 (7.7)	49.9 (9.9)	57.4 (14.1)	66.9 (19.4)	69.3 (20.7)	74.7 (23.7)	74.0 (23.3)	70.4 (21.3)	60.3 (15.7)	49.6 (9.8)	44.8 (7.1)	58.7 (14.8)
Daily mean °F (°C)	36.0 (2.2)	38.8 (3.8)	41.4 (5.2)	46.7 (8.2)	53.7 (12.1)	57.0 (13.9)	60.9 (16.1)	61.0 (16.1)	57.9 (14.4)	50.7 (10.4)	42.8 (6.0)	39.1 (3.9)	48.8 (9.3)
Mean daily minimum °F (°C)	30.3 (−0.9)	31.7 (−0.2)	33.0 (0.6)	36.0 (2.2)	40.6 (4.8)	44.8 (7.1)	47.1 (8.4)	48.0 (8.9)	45.4 (7.4)	41.1 (5.1)	36.1 (2.3)	33.4 (0.8)	38.9 (3.8)
Record low °F (°C)	1 (−17)	5 (−15)	14 (−10)	13 (−11)	22 (−6)	32 (0)	34 (1)	36 (2)	30 (−1)	19 (−7)	11 (−12)	6 (−14)	1 (−17)
Average precipitation inches (mm)	18.9 (480)	15.6 (400)	13.4 (340)	7.4 (190)	4.3 (110)	3.2 (81)	2.1 (53)	2.1 (53)	4.8 (120)	12.1 (310)	17.2 (440)	19.6 (500)	120.8 (3,070)
Average snowfall inches (cm)	19.9 (51)	6.5 (17)	5.5 (14)	0.5 (1.3)	0 (0)	0 (0)	0 (0)	0 (0)	0 (0)	0 (0)	2.1 (5.3)	5.4 (14)	39.9 (101)

== Demographics ==
Historical population
Census	Pop.	Note	%±
1890	1,632		—
1900	1,194		−26.8%
1910	2,488		108.4%
1920	2,158		−13.3%
1930	2,460		14.0%
1940	2,242		−8.9%
1950	2,328		3.8%
1960	2,486		6.8%
1970	2,847		14.5%
1980	3,247		14.0%
1990	3,064		−5.6%
2000	3,312		8.1%
2010	3,976		20.0%
2020	4,138		4.1%
2024 (est.)	4,194		1.4%
U.S. Decennial Census; 2020 Census

=== 2020 census ===
As of the 2020 census, Montesano had a population of 4,138. The median age was 43.0 years. 20.5% of residents were under the age of 18 and 22.3% of residents were 65 years of age or older. For every 100 females there were 97.6 males, and for every 100 females age 18 and over there were 93.9 males age 18 and over.

97.4% of residents lived in urban areas, while 2.6% lived in rural areas.

There were 1,687 households in Montesano, of which 30.3% had children under the age of 18 living in them. Of all households, 45.5% were married-couple households, 17.5% were households with a male householder and no spouse or partner present, and 28.0% were households with a female householder and no spouse or partner present. About 28.2% of all households were made up of individuals and 14.0% had someone living alone who was 65 years of age or older.

There were 1,786 housing units, of which 5.5% were vacant. The homeowner vacancy rate was 1.1% and the rental vacancy rate was 4.1%.

Racial composition as of the 2020 census
Race	Number	Percent
White	3,551	85.8%
Black or African American	33	0.8%
American Indian and Alaska Native	63	1.5%
Asian	72	1.7%
Native Hawaiian and Other Pacific Islander	4	0.1%
Some other race	57	1.4%
Two or more races	358	8.7%
Hispanic or Latino (of any race)	214	5.2%

=== 2010 census ===
As of the 2010 Census, there were 3,976 people, 1,563 households, and 1,031 families residing in the city. The population density was 381.9 inhabitants per square mile (147.5/km^{2}). There were 1,684 housing units at an average density of 161.8 per square mile (62.5/km^{2}). The racial makeup of the city was 80.3% White, 0.4% African American, 5% Native American, 0.10% Asian, 0.2% Pacific Islander, 0.6% from other races, and 3.4% from two or more races. Hispanic or Latino of any race were 9.8% of the population.

Of the 1,563 households, 31.0% had children under the age of 18 living with them, 48.6% were married couples living together, 11.7% had a female householder with no husband present, 5.7% had a male householder with no wife present, and 34.0% were non-families. 27.8% of all households were made up of individuals, and 10.8% had someone living alone who was 65 years of age or older. The average household size was 2.39 and the average family size was 2.88.

The median age in the city was 41.4 years. 21.9% of residents were under the age of 18; 8.3% were between the ages of 18 and 24; 25.1% were from 25 to 44; 28.4% were from 45 to 64; and 16.3% were 65 years of age or older. The gender makeup of the city was 49.2% male and 50.8% female.

=== 2000 census ===
As of the 2000 Census, there were 3,312 people, 1,326 households, and 879 families residing in the city. The population density was 320.4 people per square mile (123.7/km^{2}). There were 1,408 housing units at an average density of 136.2 per square mile (52.6/km^{2}). The racial makeup of the city was 94.99% White, 0.12% African American, 1.87% Native American, 0.48% Asian, 0.06% Pacific Islander, 0.18% from other races, and 2.29% from two or more races. Hispanic or Latino of any race were 1.84% of the population.

Of the 1,326 households, 30.9% had children under the age of 18 living with them, 51.4% were married couples living together, 10.5% had a female householder with no husband present, and 33.7% were non-families. 28.4% of all households were made up of individuals, and 13.5% had someone living alone who was 65 years of age or older. The average household size was 2.38 and the average family size was 2.92.

In the city, the population was spread out, with 23.8% under the age of 18, 8.5% from 18–24, 28.7% from 25–44, 23.6% from 45–64, and 15.4% who were 65 years of age or older. The median age was 39 years. For every 100 females, there were 99.4 males. For every 100 females age 18 and over, there were 96.2 males.

The median income for a household in the city was $40,204, and the median income for a family was $42,344. Males had a median income of $41,500 versus $30,096 for females. The per capita income for the city was $19,467. About 9.3% of families and 11.6% of the population were below the poverty line, including 12.4% of those under age 18 and 10.7% of those aged 65 or over.

== Arts and culture ==
=== Festivals and events ===
The annual Festival of Lights is a winter holiday event that is celebrated in the city. The highlight of the weekend is the Grand Parade. Festivities include tours of decorated historic homes, a lighting contest, arts and crafts show, a children's play zone, food vendors, the jingle bell jog, a scavenger hunt, storytelling, tours of the county courthouse and murals, and a pancake breakfast. Other activities include the Yule Log lighting, chowder feed, and caroling.

=== Historic buildings and sites ===
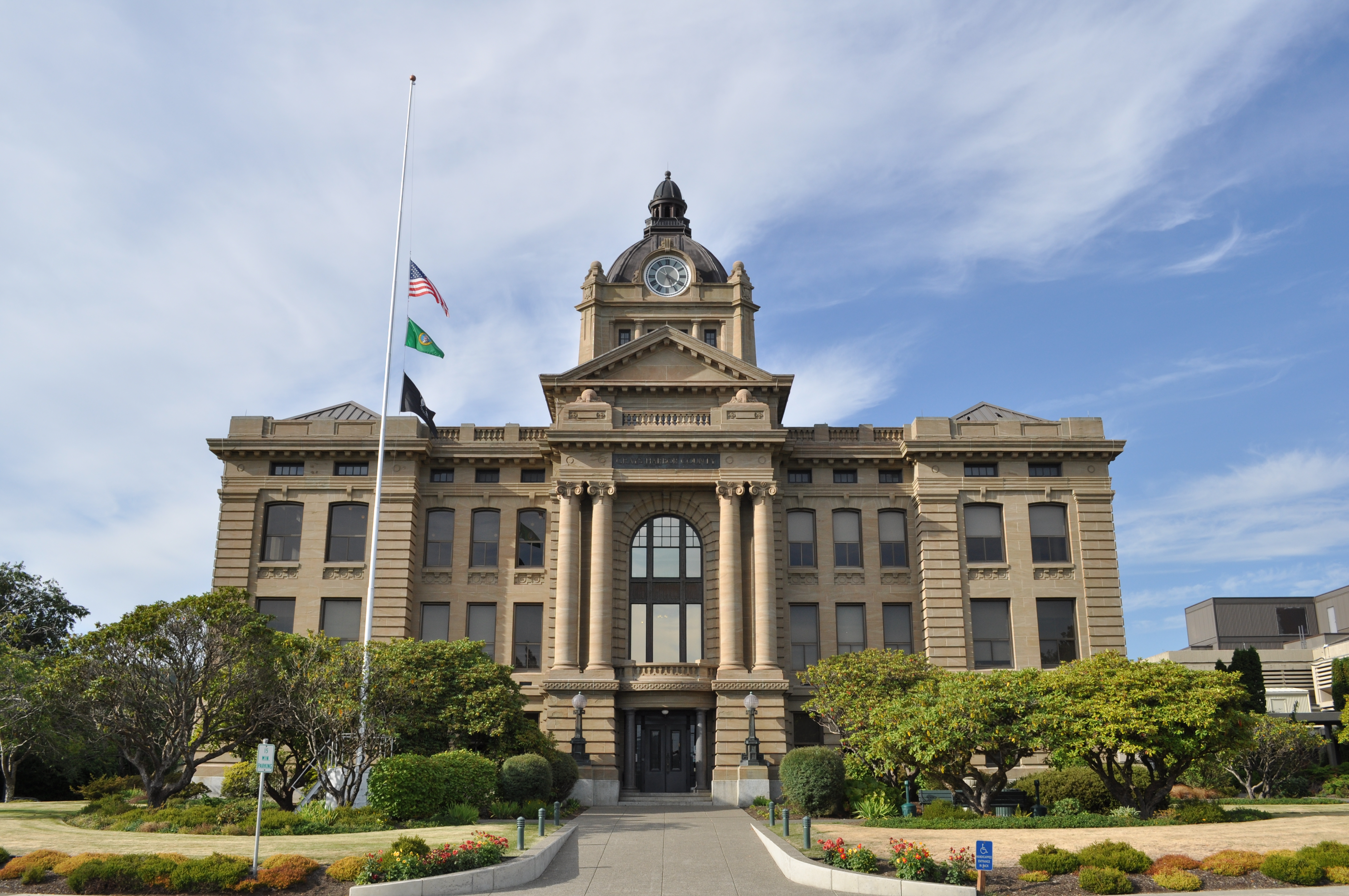
Grays Harbor County Courthouse

A prominent feature of the town is the 1911 Grays Harbor County Courthouse, a three-story structure with a domed tower. The interior features murals of local history. There is a dent in the front door made by the sheriff as he fired at a fleeing felon. The motto "come on vacation and leave on probation" was coined for this Grays Harbor County city.

== Parks and recreation ==
In the northern part of the town is Lake Sylvia State Park. Wynooche Valley Road is a route that travels north from Montesano and follows the course of the Wynoochee River; it forms an access way to the southern Olympic Mountains and the southern quarter of Olympic National Park.

== Infrastructure ==
The city was a recipient of the installation of flood control measures near Montesano's wastewater treatment plant. As part of the Chehalis Basin Strategy, log jacks were placed during 2018–2019 that helped increase the riverbank of the migrating Wynoochee River, which was threatening the plant that during flooding would have inundated the community with sewage runoff. The $2 million cost of the project was estimated to have saved over $40 million in future cleanup and containment efforts. The fortification increased the habitat of aquatic species and extended the operating life of the plant by several decades.

== Education ==
Primary and secondary education in Montesano is provided by the Montesano School District.

== Notable residents ==
- Adam Bighill (born 1988), American and Canadian football player
- Kurt Cobain (1967–1994), Nirvana lead singer and guitarist
- Reuben Hollis Fleet 1887 – 1975), American aviation pioneer, businessman and army officer
- Jerry Lambert, actor and voiceover artist
- J. T. Medcalf (1843–1899), Washington State legislator
- The band Melvins was formed in Montesano in 1983
- Robert Moch (1914 – 2005), University of Washington team leader that won the gold medal in the 1936 Summer Olympics
- Buzz Osbourne (born 1964), singer and guitarist
- Blanche Pennick (1905–1991), Washington State legislator and educator.
- Fran Polsfoot (1928–1985), football NFL end

== See also ==
- Lake Sylvia State Park
