= Lake Sylvia State Park =

State park in Washington (state), United States

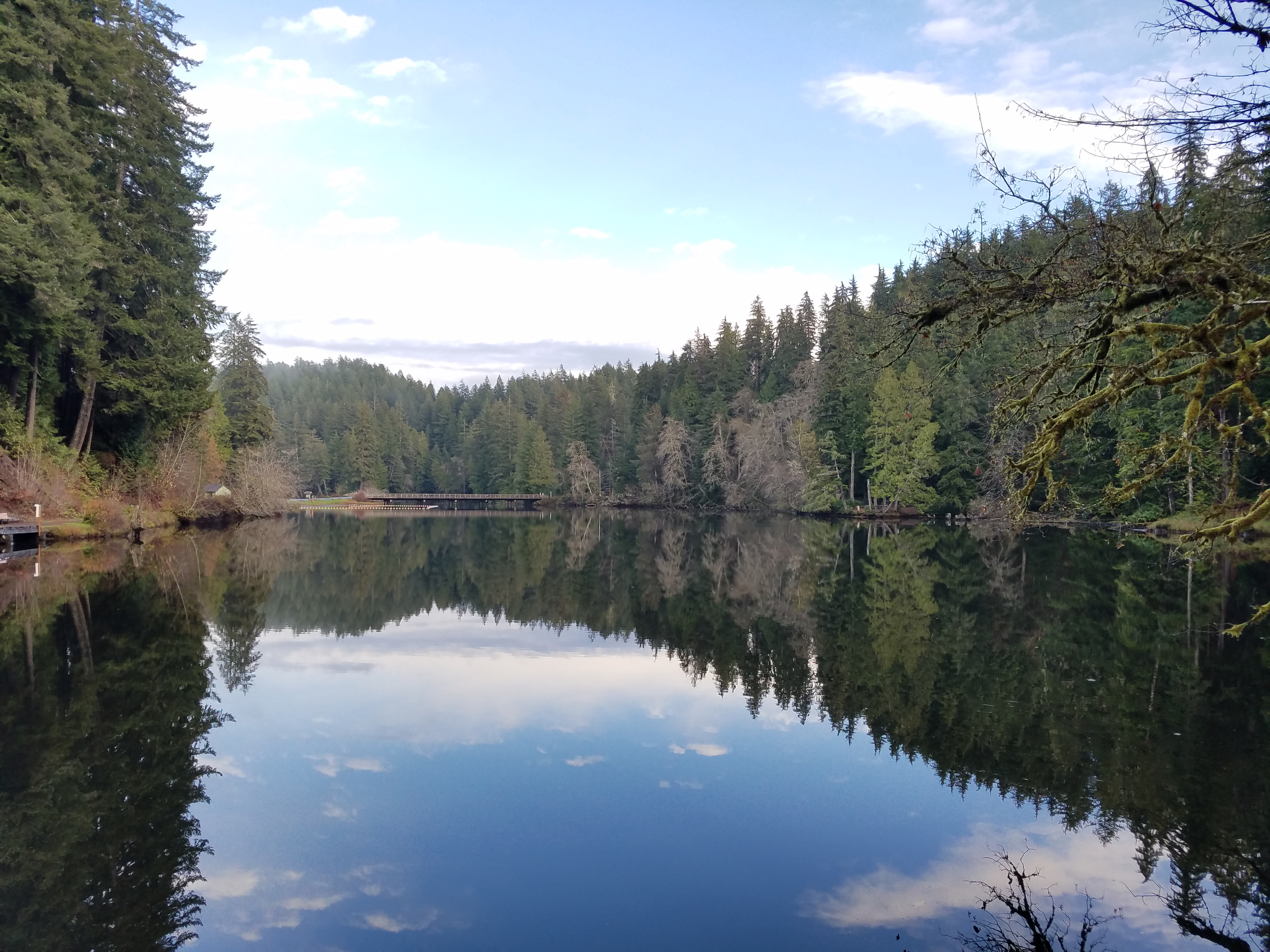
- Lake Sylvia as seen from the dam

- Location within Washington (state) Location within the United States
- Location: Grays Harbor County, Washington, United States
- Coordinates: 46°59′50″N 123°35′34″W
- Area: 233 acres (94 ha)
- Elevation: 121 ft (37 m)
- Established: 1936
- Administrator: Washington State Parks and Recreation Commission
- Website: Official website

Lake Sylvia State Park is a 233-acre (94 ha) state-operated, public recreation area in the northern part of Montesano in Grays Harbor County, Washington. The park is located in dense temperate rain forest.

== History ==
The area was originally homesteaded in the late 1860s by Michael F. Luark, who built Grays Harbor County's first water-powered sawmill there in 1871.

The present dam was built around 1909; its penstock (now mostly demolished) provided the power for a generator house alongside the creek, down below. The generator and lake provided power and water for Montesano into the early 1930s, when the powerhouse was dismantled. Elsie Wilder was almost certainly the only woman in the United States to operate a power plant in the 1920s.

In 1931, the City of Montesano purchased the surrounding watershed for $12,000 (equivalent to $254,048 in 2025) to safeguard its primary water source. The property was deeded to Washington State Parks in 1936.

The Legacy Pavilion, an open-sided pavilion with large stone fireplace, picnic tables and benches, was completed in 2020. The structure was designed by Will Foster and cost $1.1 million (equivalent to $1,368,458 in 2025) to construct.

== Ecology and environment ==
The municipal watershed of Montesano lies above the head of the lake, at the eastern end of Lake Sylvia, and is accessible by foot through the park. The city watershed is managed very similarly to a national forest and serves as a corridor for wildlife to enter and leave the park and the northern parts of the town.

The park is home to a mixed flock of mallard ducks and Canada geese. A family of ospreys, as well as occasional bald eagles, also occupy the lake area. There is also a small group of beavers living along Sylvia Creek, which flows from the lake.

== Park features ==
Sylvia State park offers swimming, hiking, camping, fishing, and non-motored boating.

The park also features an outdoor kitchen, picnic tables, ADA-accessible playground, and an event venue which can host up to 60 guests.

Overnight camping is also available, with restrooms and showers facilities (some ADA-accessible).
