= Doty, Washington =

Unincorporated community in Washington, United States

- Unincorporated community
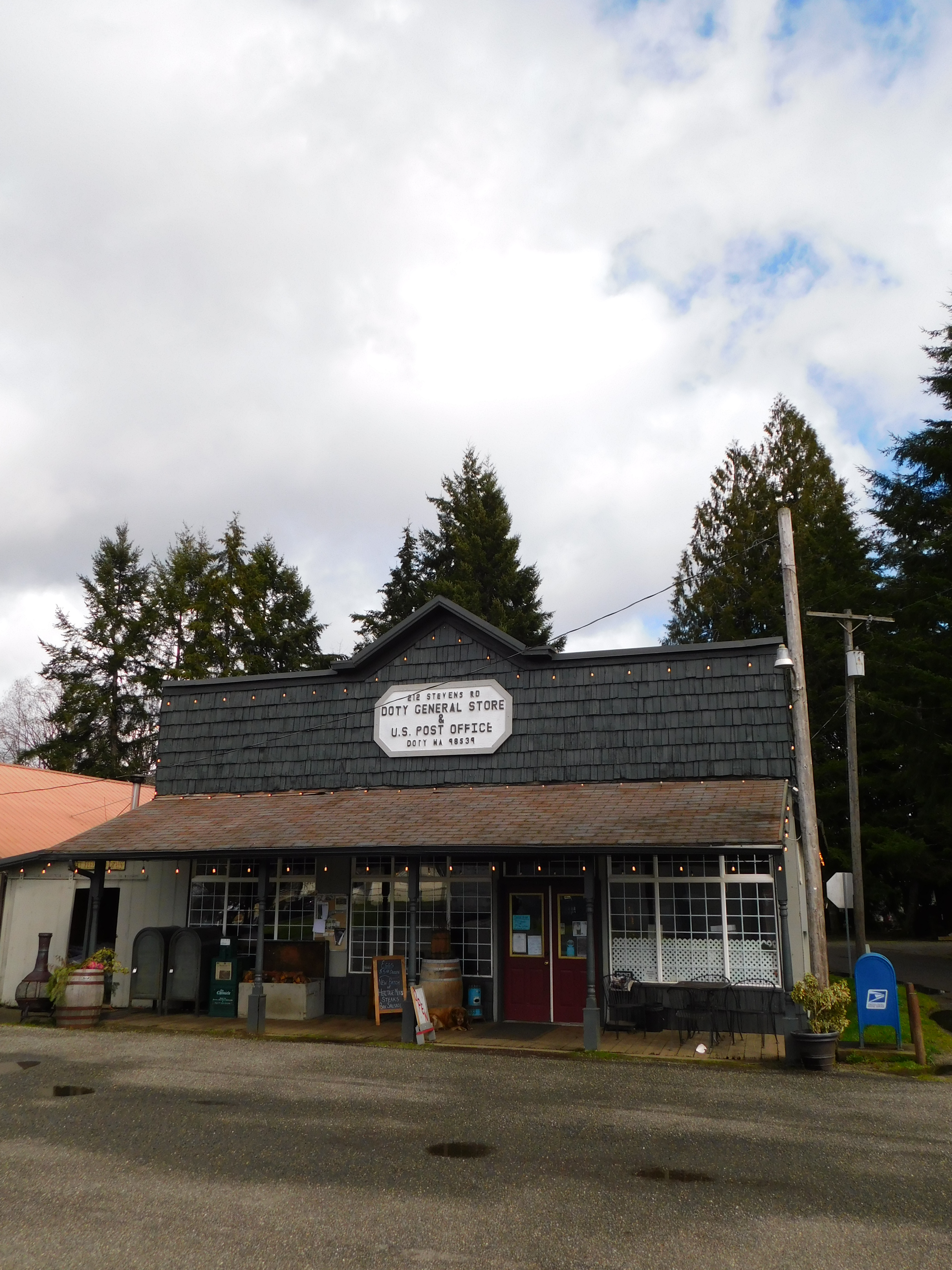
- Doty General Store and Post Office

- Location within Washington (state) Location within the United States
- Coordinates: 46°38′04″N 123°16′40″W
- Country: United States
- State: Washington
- County: Lewis
- Established: 1900
- Elevation: 312 ft (95 m)

Population
  - Total: approx. 250
- Time zone: UTC-8 (Pacific (PST))
  - Summer (DST): UTC-7 (PDT)
- ZIP Code: 98539
- Area code(s): 360, 564
- GNIS feature ID: 1512158

Doty, Washington is an unincorporated community located 1.3 miles (2.1 km) directly west of Dryad and 5 miles (8.0 km) east of Pe Ell on Washington State Route 6. As of 2023, approximately 250 people reside in or around Doty, which boasts a general store, post office, fire department, and two churches. Logging and farming are the industries that most of the residents rely on for income.

== History ==
The Doty-Dryad area was once known as North Prairie and the lands were first settled in 1852 by Joseph and Karolina Mauermann, Austrian immigrants who traveled by wagon train from Missouri. The region was inundated with strands of old growth fir and teemed with abundant wildlife, including cougars which caused issues for farmers attempting to raise cattle. The closest post office at the time was in Olympia, approximately 50 miles (80 km) away.

Chauncey A. Doty built a sawmill in the area around 1900, and the community that sprang up around it was named after him. Doty once boasted the largest sawmill in Lewis County. In 1923, the Cowlitz, Chehalis, & Cascade Railroad, during a region-wide expansion, renamed the spur station at Doty to Macomber, in honor of a local family.

=== Post office ===
A post office was established in Doty inside a store on November 2, 1900 but the building was lost in a fire. Reestablished inside the historic Doty General Store, the post office was once moved to a postmaster's house in 1957 where it operated until shifting back to the store in 1973. In 2000, the post office celebrated its 100th anniversary though the location only provided post office boxes for rental.

== Climate ==
This region experiences warm (but not hot) and dry summers, with no average monthly temperatures above 71.6 °F. According to the Köppen Climate Classification system, Doty has a warm-summer Mediterranean climate, abbreviated "Csb" on climate maps.

== Arts and culture ==
=== Historic buildings and sites ===
Doty was once home to the Doty Bridge, a covered railroad bridge that was one of the last remaining in the state. It was listed on the National Register of Historic Places but had its designation removed in 1990.

The Willapa Hills Sheep Dairy & Farmstead, also known as Stannek Farm, was constructed in 1936 and is listed on the Washington State Heritage Barn Register.

== Parks and recreation ==
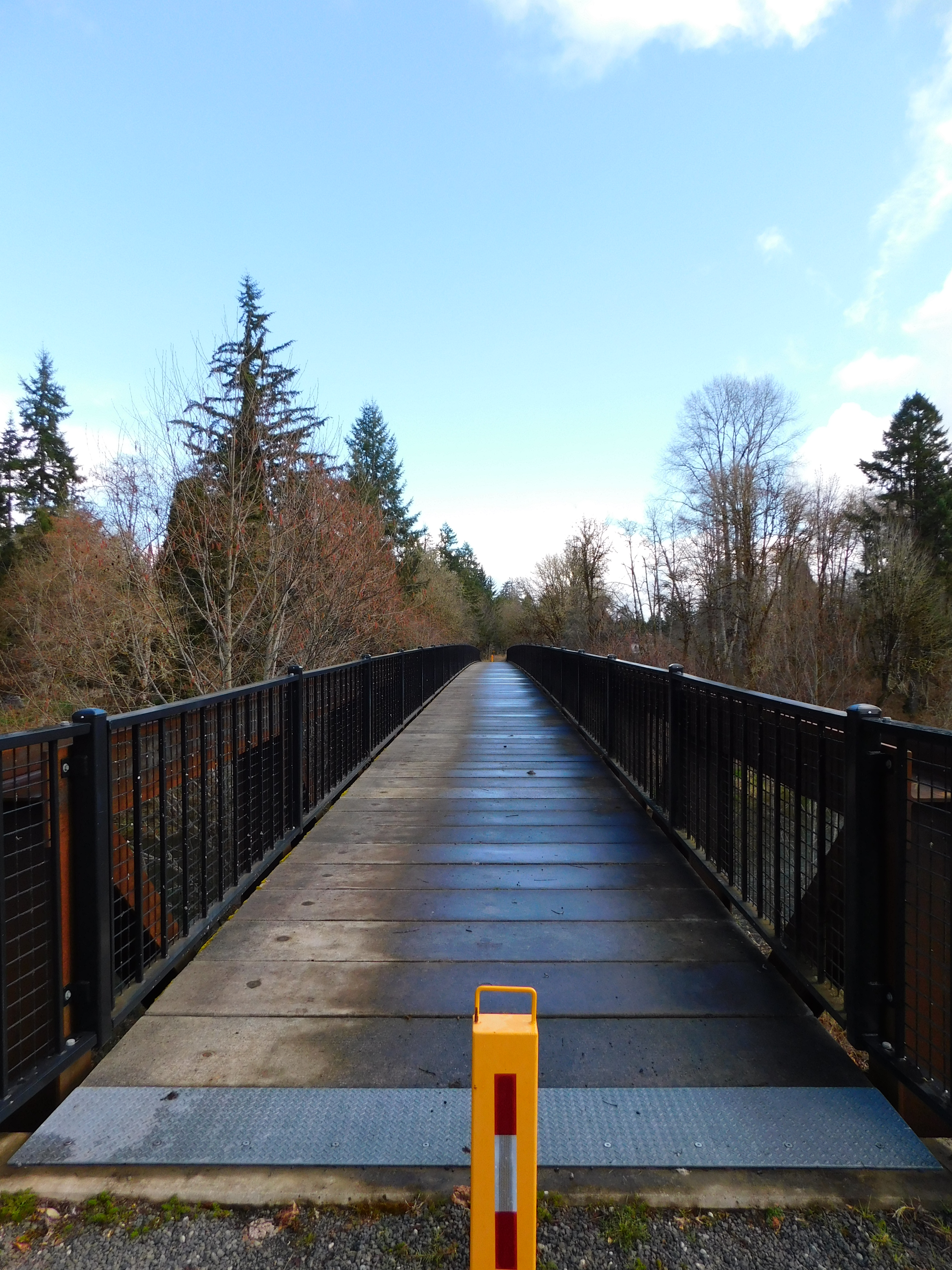
Between Dryad and Doty, Willapa Hills Trail bridge over the Chehalis River, 2025

Many residents in Doty participate in the annual Pe Ell River Run that has been held since 1978. The event consists of entrants buying or building water crafts and floating down the Chehalis River from Pe Ell to Rainbow Falls State Park, where riders can float over a slight waterfall that remained after severe flooding damage due to the Great Coastal Gale of 2007.

The Willapa Hills Trail passes thru the area.

== Government and politics ==
Presidential Elections Results
| Year | Republican | Democratic | Third parties |
|---|---|---|---|
| 2008 | 72.0% 126 | 28.0% 49 | 0.0% 0 |

A distinct voting district under Doty has not been registered by the Lewis County Auditor since the 2008 election cycle. Nearby districts, such as Elk Creek and Mauerman, are not included in the election results table.
