= Pe Ell, Washington =

- Town
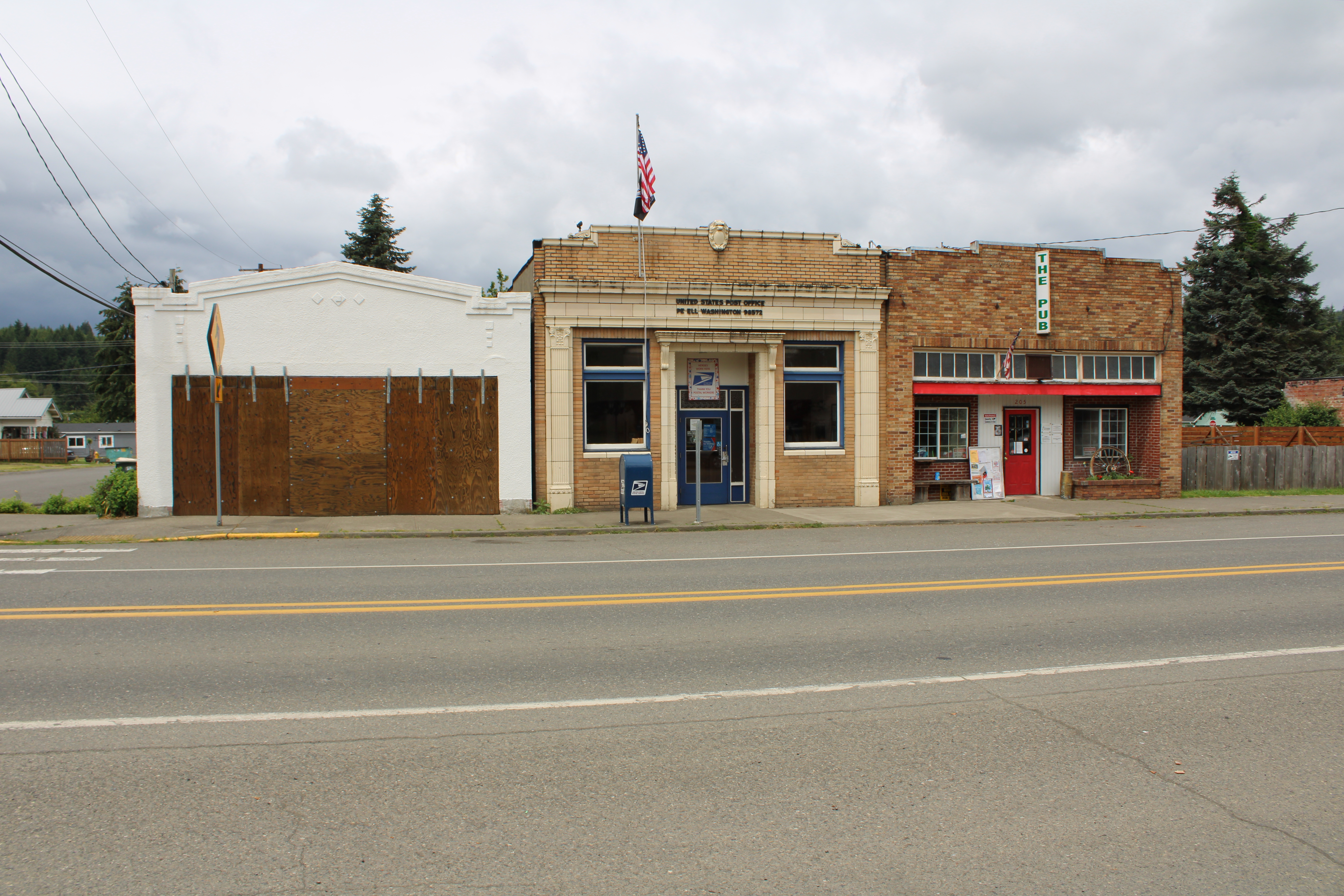
- Pe Ell Post Office & The Pub, 2024

- Location of Pe Ell, Washington
- Coordinates: 46°34′17″N 123°17′54″W
- Country: United States
- State: Washington
- County: Lewis

Government
  - Type: Mayor–council
  - Mayor: Lonnie Willey

Area
  - Total: 0.60 sq mi (1.55 km^{2})
  - Land: 0.59 sq mi (1.53 km^{2})
  - Water: 0.0077 sq mi (0.02 km^{2})
- Elevation: 413 ft (126 m)

Population (2020)
  - Total: 642
  - Density: 1,141.2/sq mi (440.62/km^{2})
- Time zone: UTC−8 (Pacific (PST))
  - Summer (DST): UTC−7 (PDT)
- ZIP Code: 98572
- Area code: 360, 564
- FIPS code: 53-53930
- GNIS feature ID: 2413122
- Website: www.townofpeell.com

Pe Ell (/piːɛl/) is a town in Lewis County, Washington, United States. The population was 642 at the 2020 census. The rich agricultural and timber resources of the region attracted farmers, millworkers, and loggers. State Route 6 passes through the town and connects it to Chehalis in the east and Raymond in the west.

== Etymology ==
The community was almost named Mauermanna, named after one of the first non-indigenous settlers in the area, Joe Mauermann, who objected to the honor. The name Pe Ell was chosen and there are several versions of the backstory of the moniker, none of which can be authenticated.

The more accepted version is that the name comes from the attempts of the local Indians to pronounce the first name of an early French-Canadian settler, Pierre Charles, who was an ex-Hudson's Bay employee. The account has it that the Indians could not pronounce Pierre, and their attempts turned it into Pe Ell. Another rendition is that P and L were the first initials for Pierre Charles and his Indian wife. Two words were made from the initials: "Pe Ell". A differing, distinct account is that Charlie Pershell, a Frenchman, settled in the area and married an Indian woman. The Indians found it difficult to sound out the "sh" in Pershell so it became Pe Ell. A separate story mentions the railroad map designated the spot as PL, and that became the name.

== History ==
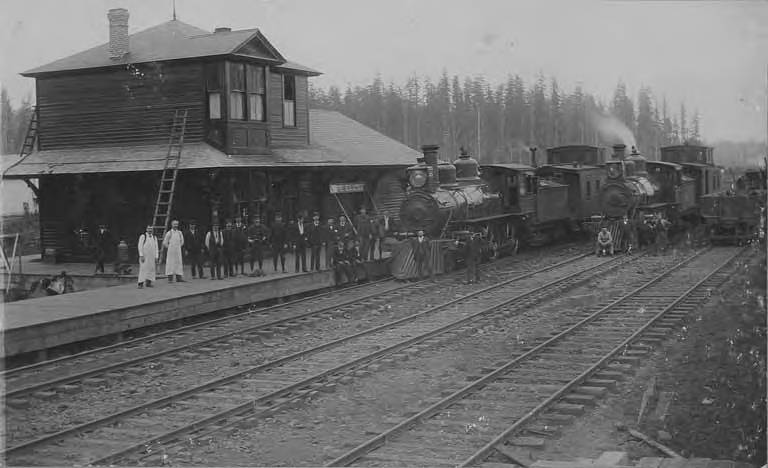
Pe Ell station along the construction route of Yakima and Pacific Coast Railroad, c.. 1890-1892

In 1897, the North Pacific Railway built a railroad depot in the town. In 1907, Pe Ell's population was around 1,000—larger than it is today. The rich agricultural and timber resources of the region attracted farmers, millworkers, and loggers. By 1909, the town had a bank, three dry goods stores, two general stores, three grocery stores, two barber shops, five saloons, four hotels, a newspaper, a blacksmith, and even an opera house.

Pe Ell was officially incorporated on March 9, 1906.

The community was once home to the Rock Creek sanitorium in the 1930s. Owned by both Lewis and Pacific counties, it was overseen by Dr. Angus MacMillan who also managed a similar tuberculosis hospital in Forest, Washington during the 1940s.

The town lost its water supply, which was provided over the historic Weyerhaeuser Pe Ell Bridge, during the Great Coastal Gale of 2007. The Chehalis River in the Pe Ell area rose 50 feet (15.2 m) during the event, overcoming the bridge and wrecking the water main. The lost pipe system was estimated to have a repair cost of $800,000; the system was installed three years earlier for $1.6 million. The financial costs to replace the bridge and the water supply lines led the Pe Ell community to temporarily consider dissolving the town's government.

== Geography ==
According to the United States Census Bureau, the town has a total area of 0.59 square miles (1.53 km^{2}), all of it land. State Route 6 passes through the town and connects it to Chehalis in the east and Raymond in the west.

== Demographics ==
Historical population
Census	Pop.	Note	%±
1910	838		—
1920	861		2.7%
1930	891		3.5%
1940	825		−7.4%
1950	787		−4.6%
1960	593		−24.7%
1970	582		−1.9%
1980	617		6.0%
1990	547		−11.3%
2000	657		20.1%
2010	632		−3.8%
2020	642		1.6%
U.S. Decennial Census; 2020 Census

=== 2010 census ===
As of the 2010 census, there were 632 people, 259 households, and 169 families living in the town. The population density was 1,071.2 inhabitants per square mile (413.6/km^{2}). There were 290 housing units at an average density of 491.5 per square mile (189.8/km^{2}). The racial makeup of the town was 91.3% White, 0.2% African American, 3.2% Native American, 1.7% from other races, and 3.6% from two or more races. Hispanic or Latino of any race were 4.3% of the population.

There were 259 households, of which 32.8% had children under the age of 18 living with them, 49.0% were married couples living together, 10.4% had a female householder with no husband present, 5.8% had a male householder with no wife present, and 34.7% were non-families. 26.6% of all households were made up of individuals, and 12.8% had someone living alone who was 65 years of age or older. The average household size was 2.44 and the average family size was 2.91.

The median age in the town was 40 years. 25% of residents were under the age of 18; 7.2% were between the ages of 18 and 24; 23.4% were from 25 to 44; 26.6% were from 45 to 64; and 17.7% were 65 years of age or older. The gender makeup of the town was 49.7% male and 50.3% female.

=== 2000 census ===
As of the 2000 census, there were 657 people, 248 households, and 174 families living in the town. The population density was 1,099.7 people per square mile (422.8/km^{2}). There were 289 housing units at an average density of 483.7 per square mile (186.0/km^{2}). The racial makeup of the town was 93.15% White, 0.30% African American, 2.28% Native American, 0.91% Asian, 0.61% Pacific Islander, 1.07% from other races, and 1.67% from two or more races. Hispanic or Latino of any race were 2.28% of the population. 23.5% were of American, 15.1% English, 12.8% German, 9.9% Irish and 8.5% Polish ancestry.

There were 248 households, out of which 33.9% had children under the age of 18 living with them, 54.8% were married couples living together, 8.9% had a female householder with no husband present, and 29.8% were non-families. 23.8% of all households were made up of individuals, and 12.1% had someone living alone who was 65 years of age or older. The average household size was 2.65 and the average family size was 3.17.

In the town, the age distribution of the population shows 30.6% under the age of 18, 7.3% from 18 to 24, 25.9% from 25 to 44, 22.2% from 45 to 64, and 14.0% who were 65 years of age or older. The median age was 34 years. For every 100 females, there were 107.3 males. For every 100 females age 18 and over, there were 103.6 males.

The median income for a household in the town was $27,321, and the median income for a family was $30,625. Males had a median income of $36,875 versus $18,125 for females. The per capita income for the town was $12,481. About 20.0% of families and 22.4% of the population were below the poverty line, including 32.7% of those under age 18 and 10.8% of those age 65 or over.

== Arts and culture ==
=== Historic buildings and sites ===
Pe Ell was home to Holy Cross Polish National Catholic Church, listed on the National Register of Historic Places (NRHP) in 1987. Constructed in 1916, it was the only known Polish church of its kind in the state. The building was razed in 2010 due to a combination of disrepair and lack of funding. A former existing site, the Weyerhaeuser Pe Ell Bridge, was designated an NRHP site in 1982 but removed in 1990.

== Parks and recreation ==
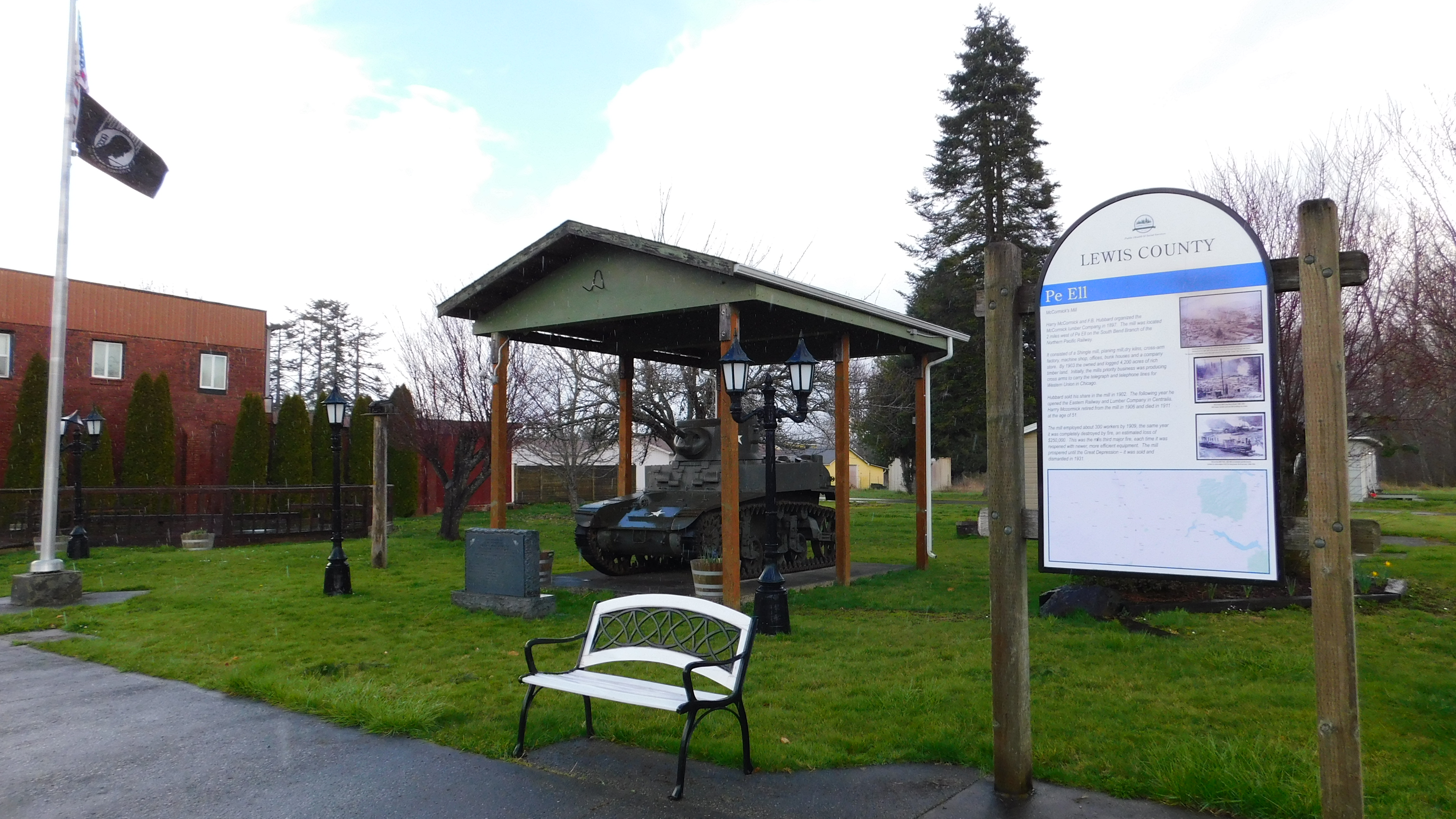
Pe Ell Veterans Memorial, 2025

The town is the starting point of the Pe Ell River Run. Begun as a birthday celebration between a local group of young men in 1978, the event consists of entrants buying or building water crafts and floating down the Chehalis River from Pe Ell to Rainbow Falls State Park, where riders can float over a slight waterfall that still remains despite severe flooding damage due to the Great Coastal Gale of 2007.

The Willapa Hills Trail bisects the town.

An M3A1 Stuart light tank is displayed as part of the veteran's memorial located along Main Street.

== Government and politics ==
Presidential Elections Results
Year	Republican	Democratic	Third parties
2008	56.9% 156	39.1% 107	4.0% 11
2012	60.5% 170	36.7% 103	2.8% 8
2016	70.2% 214	21.3% 65	8.5% 26
2020	70.6% 250	27.4% 97	2.0% 7
2024	64.3% 207	29.8% 96	5.9% 19

=== Government ===
The city of Pe Ell has historically used local law enforcement staff, rather than the county sheriff's department, for policing. The last Pe Ell town marshal formally retired on April 1, 2019. The town went through several years of intermittent local police coverage, with the county sheriff's department filling in when the marshal's office was vacant. In 2022, Pe Ell reached an agreement with the city of Morton to outsource police coverage. Since then, the Morton Police Department has provided part-time police coverage to the town, along with Mossyrock.

The town is governed by an elected mayor, along with a town council of 5 members.

=== Politics ===
The 2020 election included four votes for Jo Jorgensen of the Libertarian Party and 3 votes for write-in candidates.. In the 2024 election, eleven votes were tallied for Robert F. Kennedy Jr..

== Education ==
The Pe Ell School District provides public education from preschool to 12th grade. The Pe Ell School occupies a single campus and students attend from Pe Ell, as well as the nearby unincorporated communities of Doty and Dryad. The district shifted to a four-day school week before the 2019-2020 school year.

The first public education building erected in Pe Ell was a one-room school constructed in 1882. The schoolhouse was built of split cedar and funded by donations; twelve students attended the first year. The growing population led to the construction of a new, larger Central school beginning in 1892 only to find an expansion necessary in 1913, with a gymnasium added in 1921. A wing for agricultural vocational education was added in 1936, a class popular enough to require an expansion by 1938. The combined Pe Ell elementary and high school, furnished with a library and athletic fields, was completed at the end of 1952.

The Pe Ell high school boys' basketball team and the girls' softball team won state championships in 2010. The softball team also won a state title in 2012, and a combined championship with Willapa Valley in 2017.
