= Veterans Memorial Museum =

Museum in Chehalis, Washington

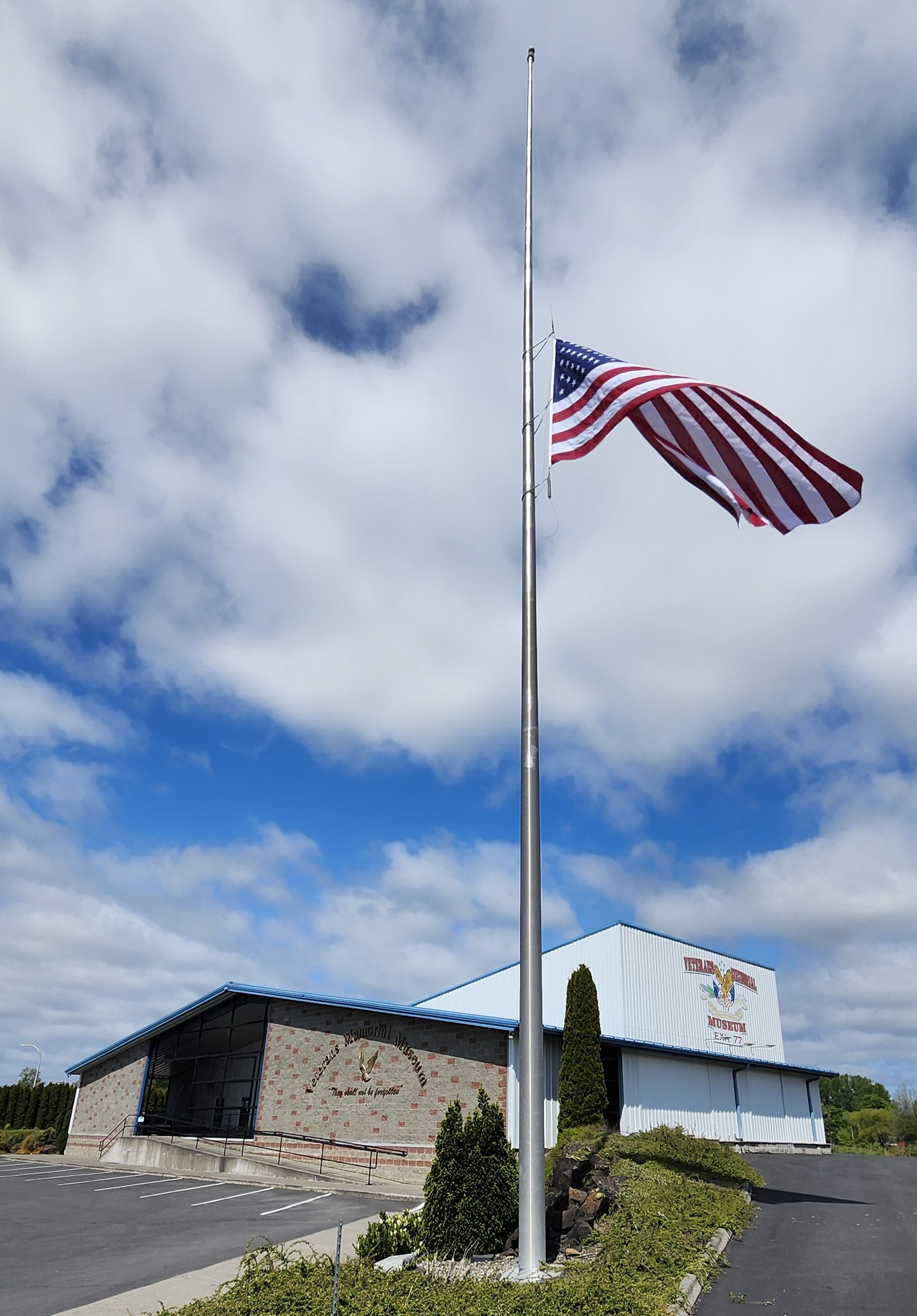
- Veterans Memorial Museum, 2025
- Established: December 1995
- Location: 100 SW Veterans Way, Chehalis, Washington
- Coordinates: 46°39′17.06″N 122°58′39.71″W
- Type: Military museum
- Collections: Military equipment, war memorabilia, and personal effects
- Collection size: 9,000 square feet (840 m^{2}), interior
- Visitors: 14000 (2011)
- Founder: Lee Grimes
- Executive director: Charles “Chip” Duncan
- Employees: Volunteer and paid staff
- Parking: Parking lot
- Website: www.veteransmuseum.org

The Veterans Memorial Museum is located in Chehalis, Washington. The museum focuses on veterans, as well as soldiers killed in action, from Lewis County and the South Puget Sound and Southwest Washington regions, who served in wars or military engagements involving the United States.

The museum started in Centralia, Washington in 1993 under Lee Grimes who began recording audio stories shared by veterans. After collecting additional recordings and war memorabilia, Grimes and others officially chartered the museum in 1995. The first museum location opened in the city in 1997. The city of Chehalis authorized a parcel of land for a permanent museum in 2000 and the museum organization began the construction of a facility and exterior exhibit space at the grounds. The Veterans Memorial Museum relocated and opened at its Chehalis location in June 2005.

The repository contains a large, military research library and a 9,000-square-foot (840 m^{2}) gallery with glass displays arranged in chronologic order. As of 2026, the historical exhibits span from the American Revolutionary War up to the Iraq and Afghanistan wars. Memorabilia, most of which was donated by veterans, includes various firearms and weapons, including ammunition, as well as personal effects of soldiers and military equipment. A large American flag, a quilt known as "Betty's Blanket", and structural debris from the 9/11 attacks are prominent items of the collection. Thousands of artifacts were damaged, but mostly repaired, during the flood of 2007.

The grounds of the museum contain retired ship cannons, a mast and memorial of the USS Nicholas (DD-449), and several military aircraft and vehicles.

The Veterans Memorial Museum is mostly run by volunteers; veterans offer guided tours of the museum space. The museum is joined with a non-profit group known as Veterans Journey Forward that provides outreach and assistance for veterans in need. The museum holds several events throughout the year to raise funds for the operational costs of the facility and its charitable programs.

== History ==
=== Formation of Centralia museum ===
The Veterans Memorial Museum was created by Lee Grimes who began planning the repository in 1993. Grimes had attended a program at a Centralia, Washington church that honored military veterans where a Navy veteran of World War II approached Grimes and stated, "we are the forgotten ones." Motivated by the phrase, the following year Grimes began audio taping stories shared by veterans, sharing the recordings at the church; he began collecting donated war memorabilia, storing the items in his garage. (Note: Grimes has also stated he founded the museum after a "spiritual visitation from God" in 1994.) Grimes, who professionally was an accountant, was not a veteran, stating he was "4-F". He mentioned that the museum's purpose was "to make a place where we can honor those who have served". The museum's motto and mission statement became, "They Shall Not Be Forgotten".

With the collection becoming too large, he and his wife, Barbara, joined other enthusiasts of the idea to officially charter the museum in December 1995.

The Veteran Memorial Museum was originally located in Centralia on Main Street. After volunteer efforts to renovate the space, the historical facility opened on Veterans Day, November 11, 1997. The Centralia location has been reported to be between 3,000 square feet (280 m^{2}) and 3,500 square feet (330 m^{2}). (Note: The museum's location in Centralia was described as a "converted warehouse".)

=== Relocation to Chehalis ===
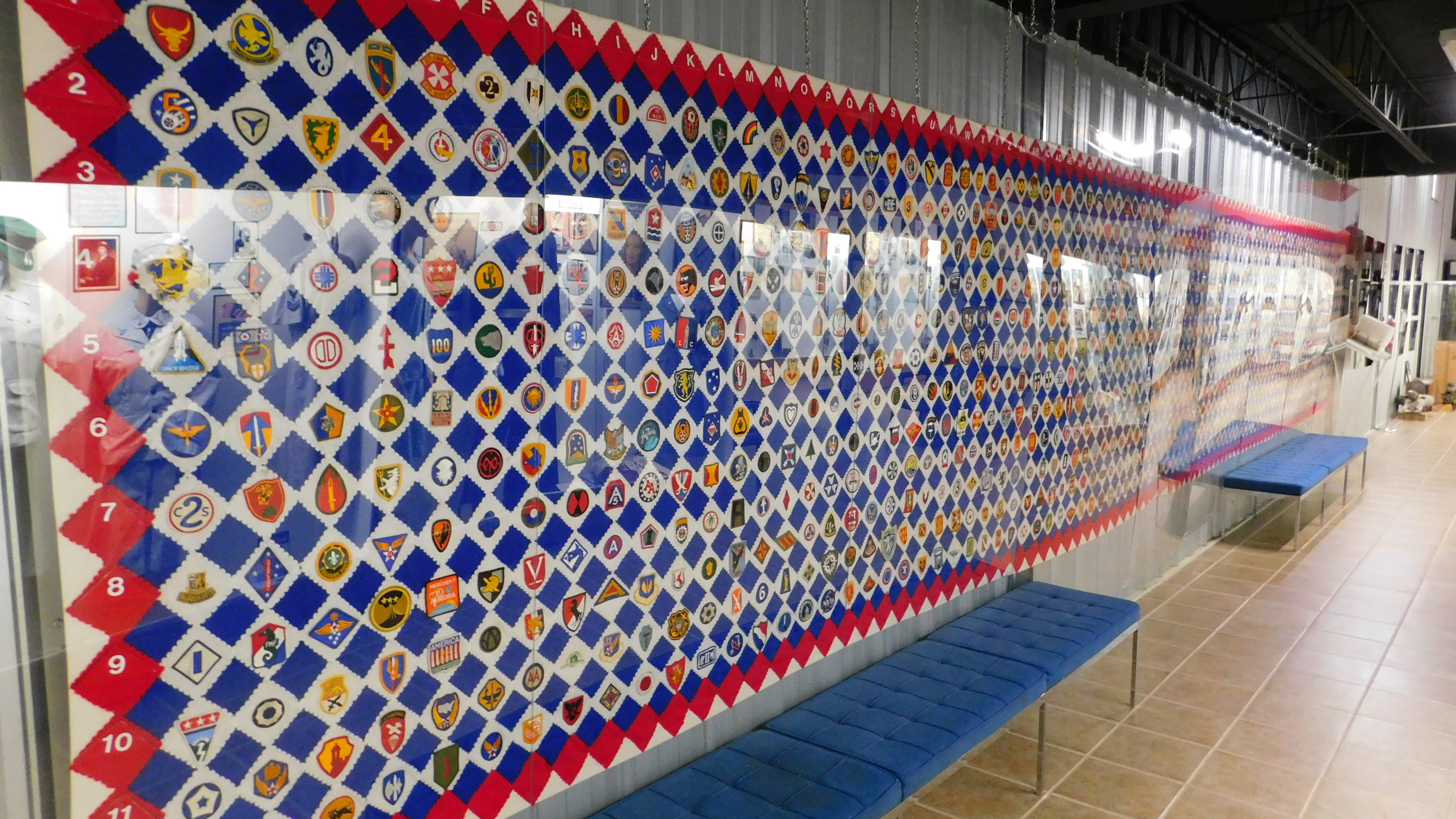
"Betty's Blanket", 2026

In September 2000, the city council of Chehalis, Washington authorized a 30-year lease to the museum for property located in the city near SW Newaukum Avenue and Interstate 5 (I-5). The museum had hoped to remain in Centralia but Chehalis "had the best offer". The parcel had previously been owned by Weyerhaeuser and used by firefighters for training. As part of the contract, the rent was $1 annually so long as the property was used only for a museum and promoted "tourism and economic development". The lease can be renewed up to three times in 30 year increments.

The construction was originally estimated to cost $700,000 (equivalent to $1,308,696 in 2025) and the museum board began plans for a $200,000 (equivalent to $373,913 in 2025) endowment fund for future maintenance of the planned 14,000 square feet (1,300 m^{2}) building. By 2001, the plans were revised to a smaller footprint of 12,000 square feet (1,100 m^{2}) but at a larger cost of $1,800,000 (equivalent to $3,365,217 in 2025).

Before the museum was constructed, the road to the grounds was renamed in August 2003 from SW Thomas Street to Veterans Way; the new street sign contained a blue font over a background of red and white stripes. A groundbreaking ceremony was held on September 26, 2003. The event was attended by a large crowd that contained veterans and their families, as well as local government officials. At the time, approximately $255,000 (equivalent to $446,296 in 2025) had been donated by Washington state to the museum. The facility was reconfigured to be 16,500 square feet (1,530 m^{2}) and constructed as a "pre-engineered" metal building. The structure was estimated to be completed by the autumn of 2004.

The museum, architecturally designed in a "wave shape", was officially opened on July 2, 2005. The facility encompassed 20,500 square feet (1,900 m^{2}) when completed and final costs were reported to be $1,458,000 (equivalent to $2,403,501 in 2025). Built without debt, funding was provided by either government grants or donations. In the first year, an average of 70 visitors per day were recorded at the museum.

Lee Grimes retired as executive director in 2010. The Veterans Memorial Museum, since its beginning, operates with a volunteer staff, though there are a few paid employees.

=== Flood of 2007 ===
The Great Coastal Gale of 2007 led to floodwaters in the city which inundated the museum with 11 inches (28 cm) of water. In addition to soaked carpeting, items located on the lower portion of some display cases were also compromised. A total of 5,000 items were recorded to have suffered some form of water damage, including 20% of the items stored in the research library. The museum paid for restorations and mitigation out of the association's endowment fund as it lacked flood insurance at the time.

Water-damaged VHS and audio cassette tapes that contained recorded recollections of veterans were damaged during the natural disaster. The tapes were cleaned and converted to DVD or CD formats; the updated collection was delivered back to the facility by Mike Gregoiore, husband of Washington's then governor, Christine Gregoire, who had volunteered to restore the audio artifacts. The museum reopened on April 26, 2008.

In order to protect historical items at the museum during future floods, the organization instituted a process allowing for staff to stay overnight during a potential flood event. A significant flood occurred in 2009 but the waters "stopped short" of entering the building. In news reports about the museum during the event, Grimes was photographed from the main entrance ramp using a fishing pole that hung over the flooded parking lot.

=== Continuing history and operations ===
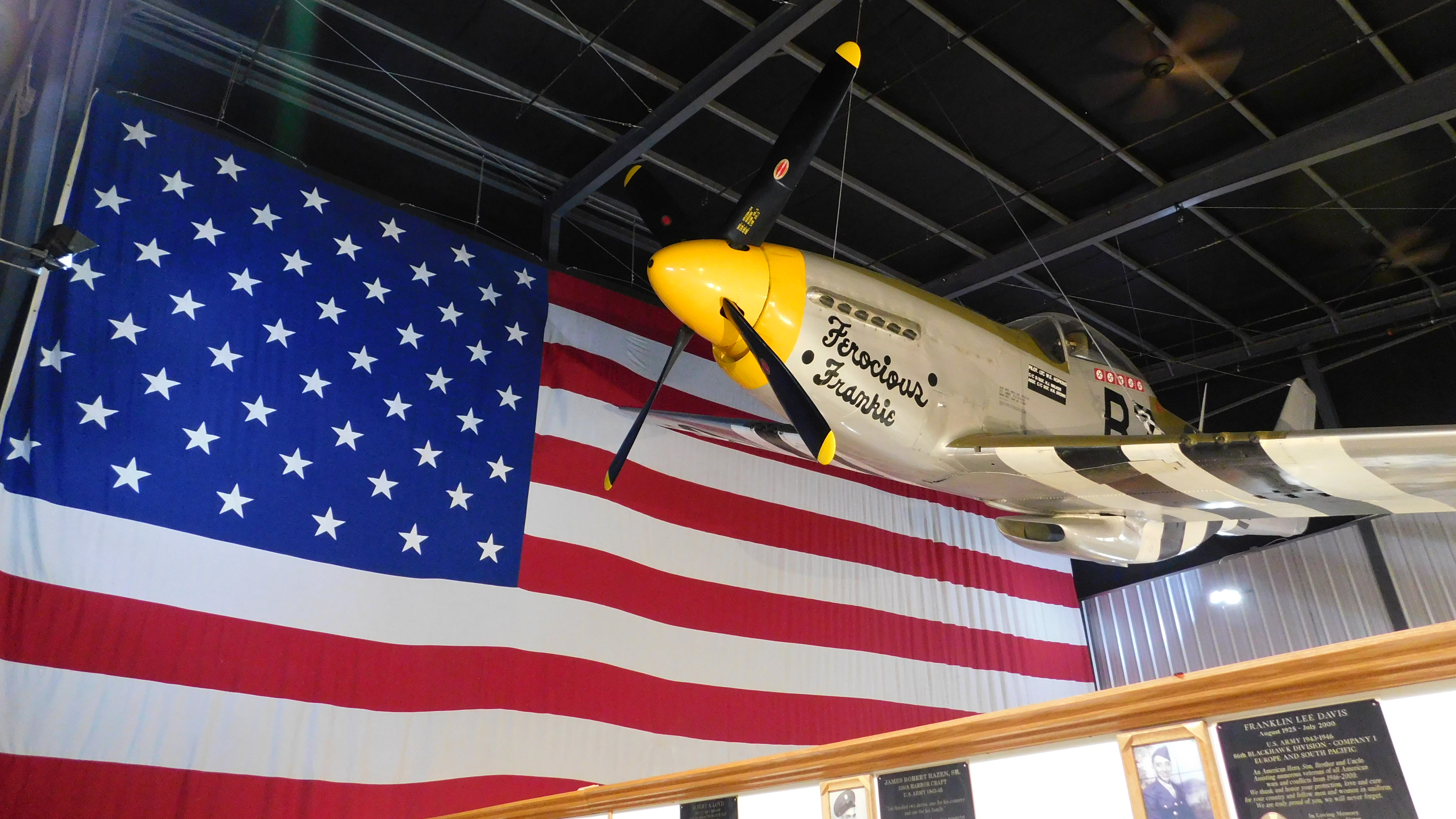
"Ferocious Frankie" and USS Abraham Lincoln (CVN-72) flag, 2026

After the floods, the museum's reserve fund was replenished by 2017; the fund helped the museum remain operational during the Covid-19 pandemic.

In August 2024, the museum held a dedication ceremony for the completed installation of the USS Nicholas (DD-449) mast and memorial. The ship was known as the "Road Runner" due to its nature of being the fastest Fletcher-class destroyer in the World War II fleet. The event featured the reading of a plaque honoring those who served on the warship, as well as its sister ship, the USS O'Bannon (DD-450). The colors of both ships were raised and grave markers in remembrance of the ship's namesakes were laid; soil from the graves of Samuel Nicholas and Presley O'Bannon were placed underneath the markers. The Nicholas Mast Memorial is meant to honor both warships.

A vigil, in memory of Charlie Kirk and his work, was held on the grounds of the museum in September 2025 days after his death. Organized by two sisters, the event included students speakers and remarks from Turning Point USA officials and local politicians. (Note: Sourcing does not mention whether the museum, or its staff, authorized or participated in the organization of the Charlie Kirk vigil.)

== Geography ==
The Veterans Memorial Museum is located in Chehalis, Washington on 100 Southwest Veterans Way. The building and 2.5-acre (1.0 ha) grounds are located just west of Interstate 5 (I-5) and near the Chehalis–Centralia Railroad.

When the museum began, its first location was 712 West Main Street in Centralia. The facility was later housed inside the Centralia Eagles building at 2308 North Pearl Street.

== Museum displays and features ==
=== Grounds ===
The grounds contain a 80 foot (24 m) flag pole; at the museum's opening in 2005, the pole was reported to be possibly the tallest in Lewis County. The site is home to the mast of the USS Nicholas (DD-449) which is situated within an exhibit on the grounds that contains a complete Bell AH-1 Cobra helicopter and a Republic F-105 Thunderchief fighter-bomber.

Two 6-inch, 30-caliber boat guns, considered "neglected and in disrepair", were relocated from Woodland Park in Seattle to the museum property in 2018. The USS Concord (PG-3) cannons; known as "Battery Dewey", were used during the Battle of Manila Bay in the midst of the Spanish-American War. Another gun, from the Civil War-era USS Colorado, is also located at the museum. The 5-inch, 51-caliber cannon was once displayed at the Museum of History & Industry.

An M3 Stuart tank is located on the grounds. The tank was acquired by the Lewis County Historical Museum in 1982 where it was displayed until 2003. The tank was relocated to the grounds of the Veterans Memorial Museum and a disagreement over ownership of the tank remains unresolved due to a lack of paperwork.

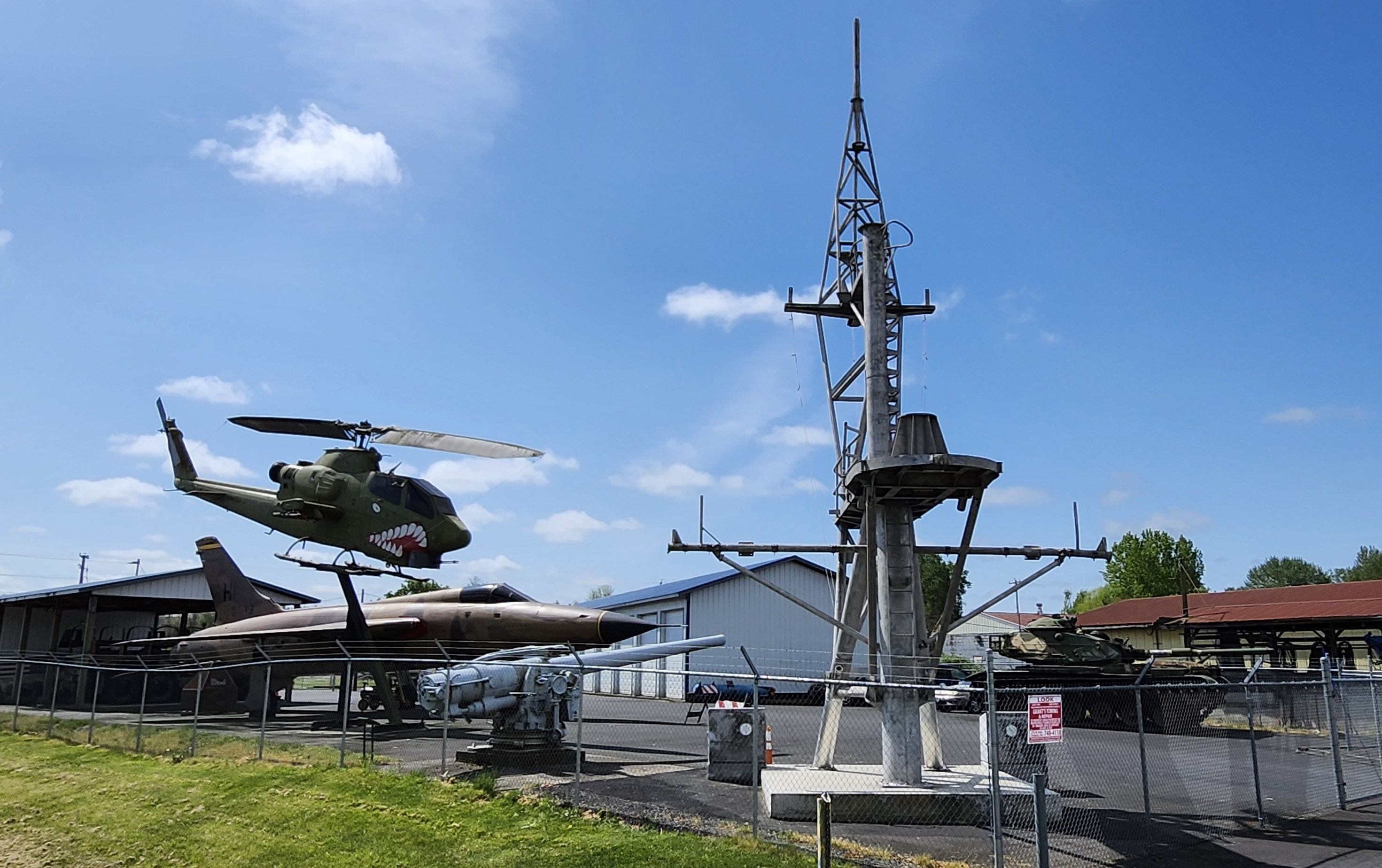
Military equipment display, 2025

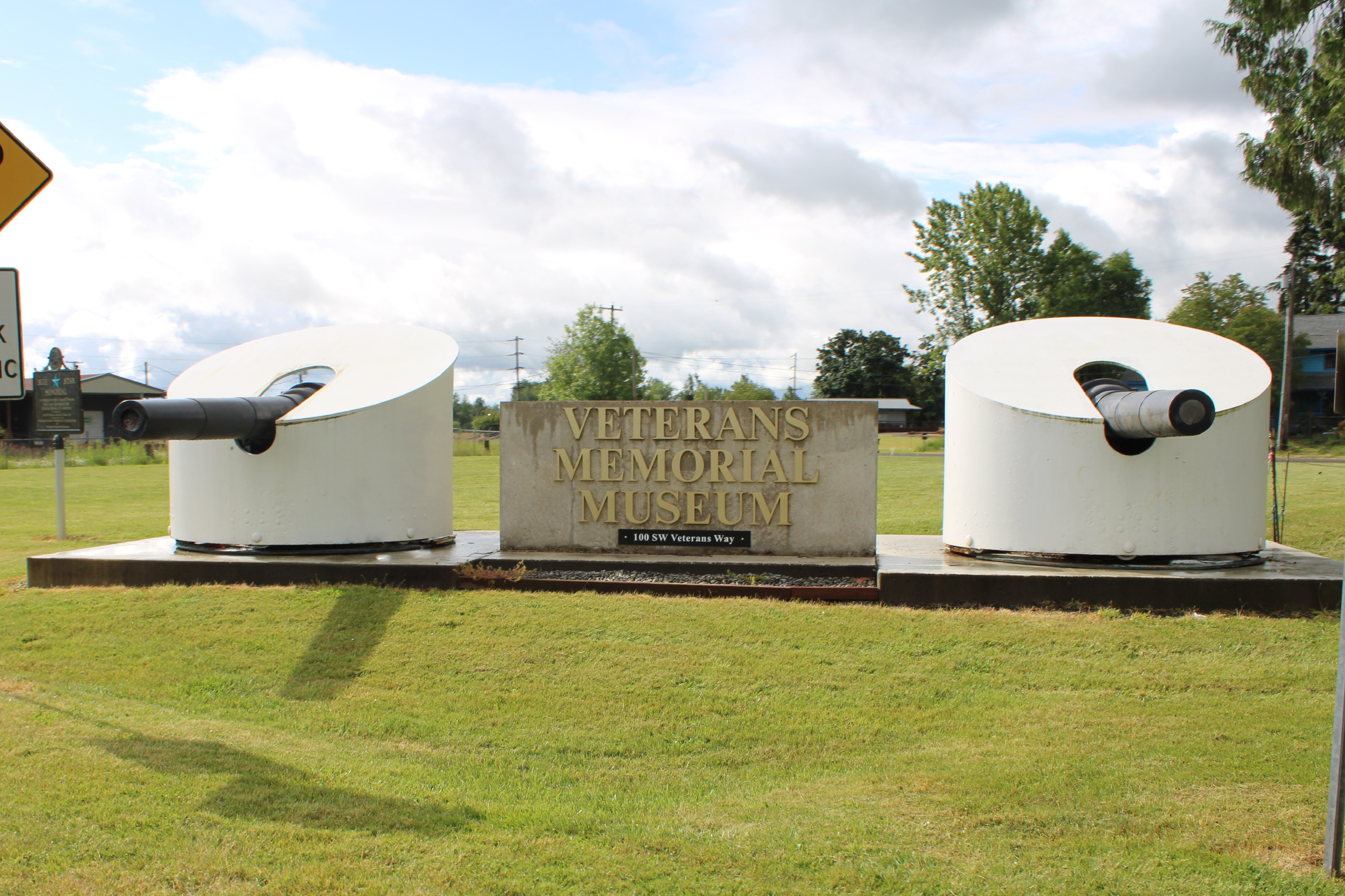
USS Concord (PG-3) cannons, 2024

=== Interior ===
The museum contains a 9,000-square-foot (840 m^{2}) gallery with glass displays arranged in chronologic order. Displays include permanent exhibits for the American Revolutionary War, World War I and World War II, the Cold War, and later military involvements such as the Bosnian War, Iraq War and the Afghanistan War. Approximately 25% of the museum's collection is rotated. A display features Nazi artifacts, and includes a history, as well as photos, of Nazi concentration camps. As of 2006, two Medals of Honor are located in the museum, including one from 1863 displayed in the American Civil War collection. The second medal belongs to Thomas Kinsman, a Vietnam War veteran from Winlock. A display also honors war dogs.

Most veterans mentioned throughout the museum come from Lewis County, South Puget Sound, and Southwest Washington. Veterans have made numerous donations of military gear, supplies, and uniforms, as well as newspaper clippings and personal effects, to the facility. A large display of hundreds of firearms from various wars include guns from British, German, and Japanese forces; the ammunition of each firearm is displayed alongside the corresponding weapon. Several soldiers from Lewis County who died in combat, including recent deaths in 21st century battle zones, have displays detailing their lives.

On the museum's back wall is a 10 ft × 20 ft (3.0 m × 6.1 m) quilt known as "Betty's Blanket". The textile work includes over 1,300 patches donated by veterans. The quilt was begun by Betty Simpson, who served in the Army during World War II. The quilt was completed by her daughters in the early 1970s. Additionally, a 60 ft × 30 ft (18.3 m × 9.1 m) American flag, originally hung in the hangar bay of the aircraft carrier, USS Abraham Lincoln (CVN-72), is featured on a large wall in the building. The flag, originally planned to be "discarded" to due its soiled state, was saved and donated to the museum by a sailor who served on the carrier.

A piece of a steel floor beam from the World Trade Center and two pieces of a concrete end cap of the façade of the Pentagon from the rubble of the 9/11 attacks were unveiled by May 2009; the display was interactive. The pieces were meant to be used for a remembrance sculpture and was briefly considered to be installed at the museum. With the artifacts considered of too historically important to use directly, replica pieces were to be fashioned instead. Costs were prohibitive and installation locations were changed, including at the Washington State Capitol in Olympia. The artwork was eventually created and later installed in Cashmere, Washington in 2015.

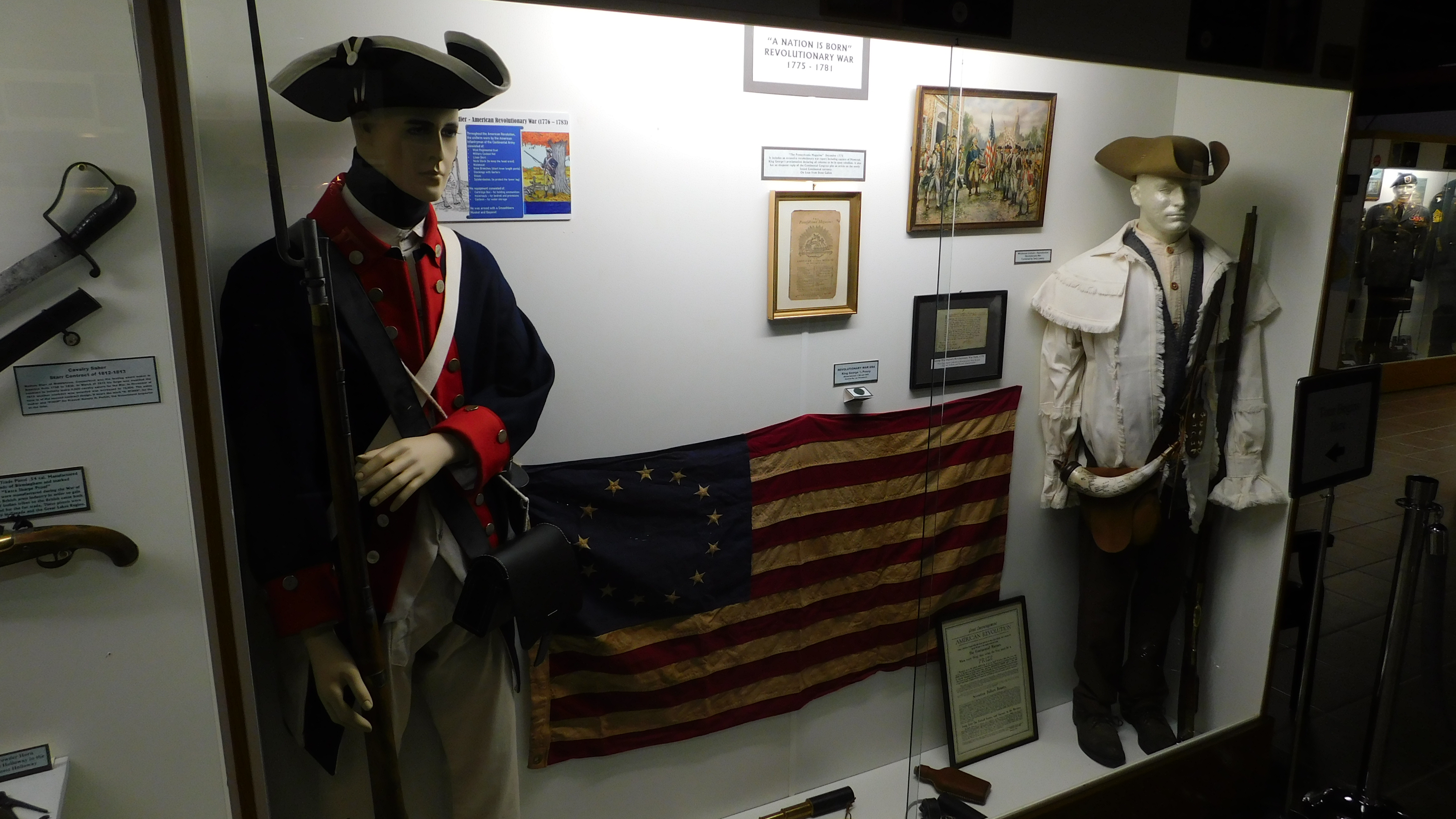
Revolutionary War exhibit, 2026

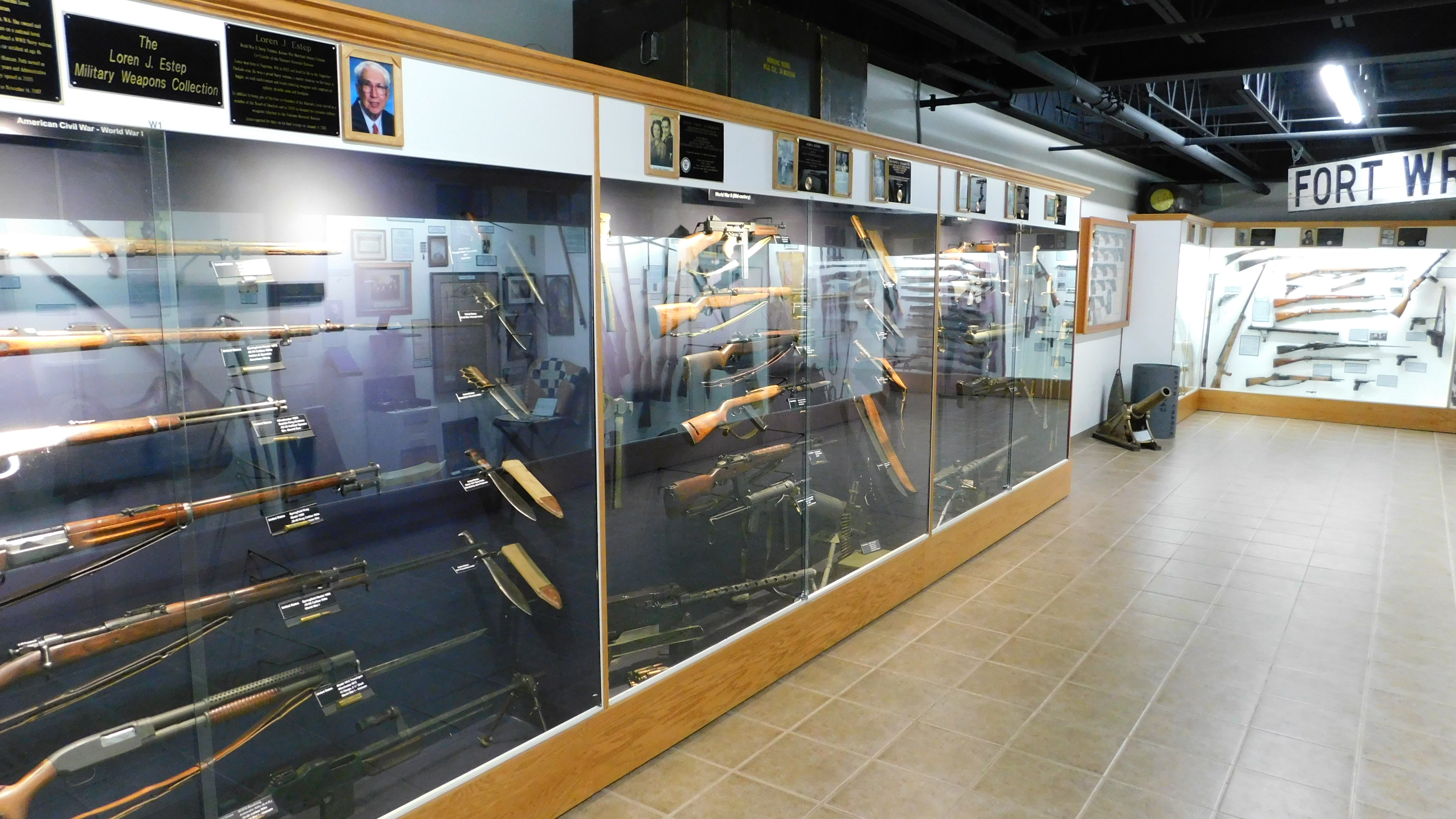
Weapons display, 2026

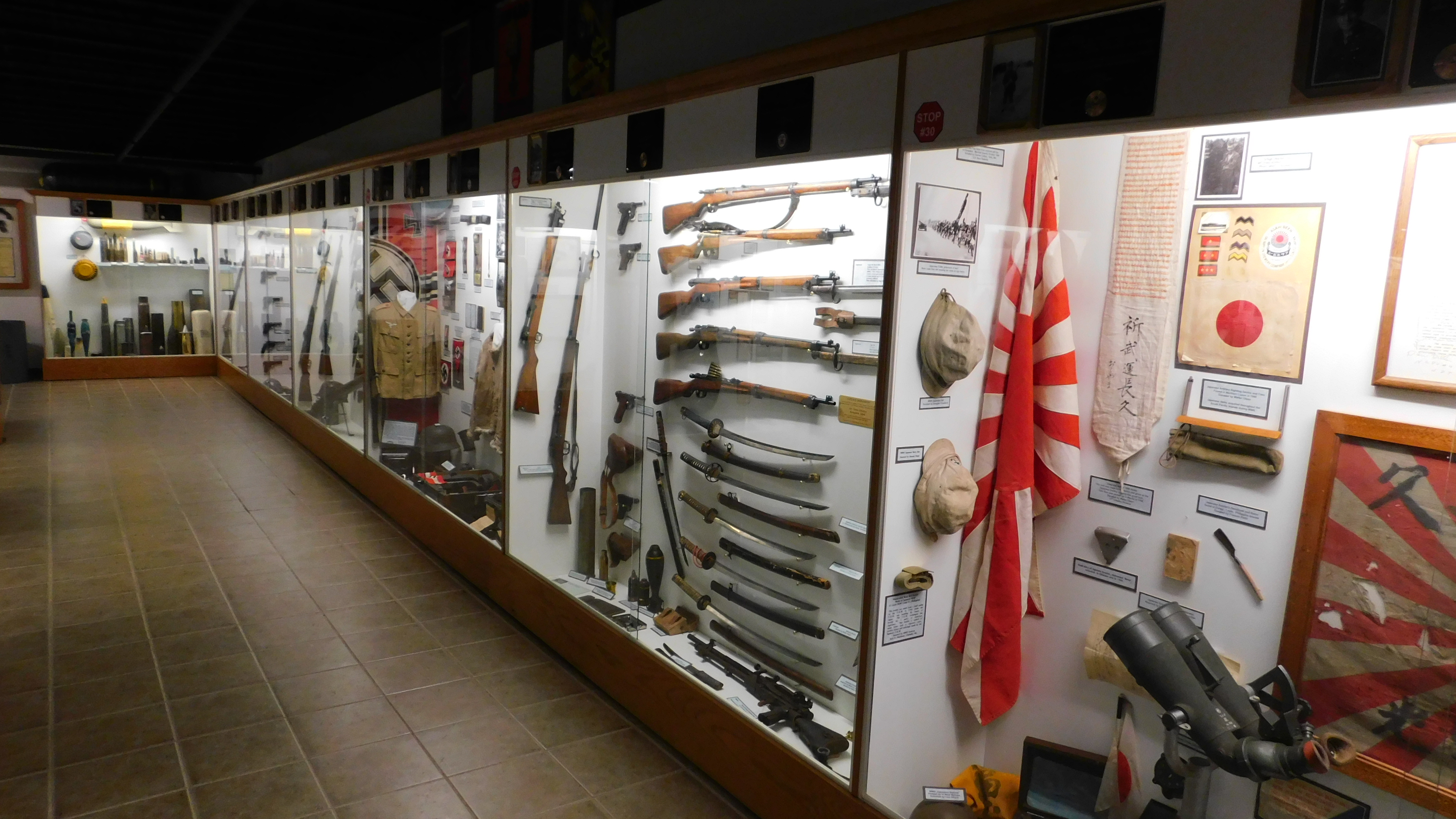
World War II exhibits, 2026

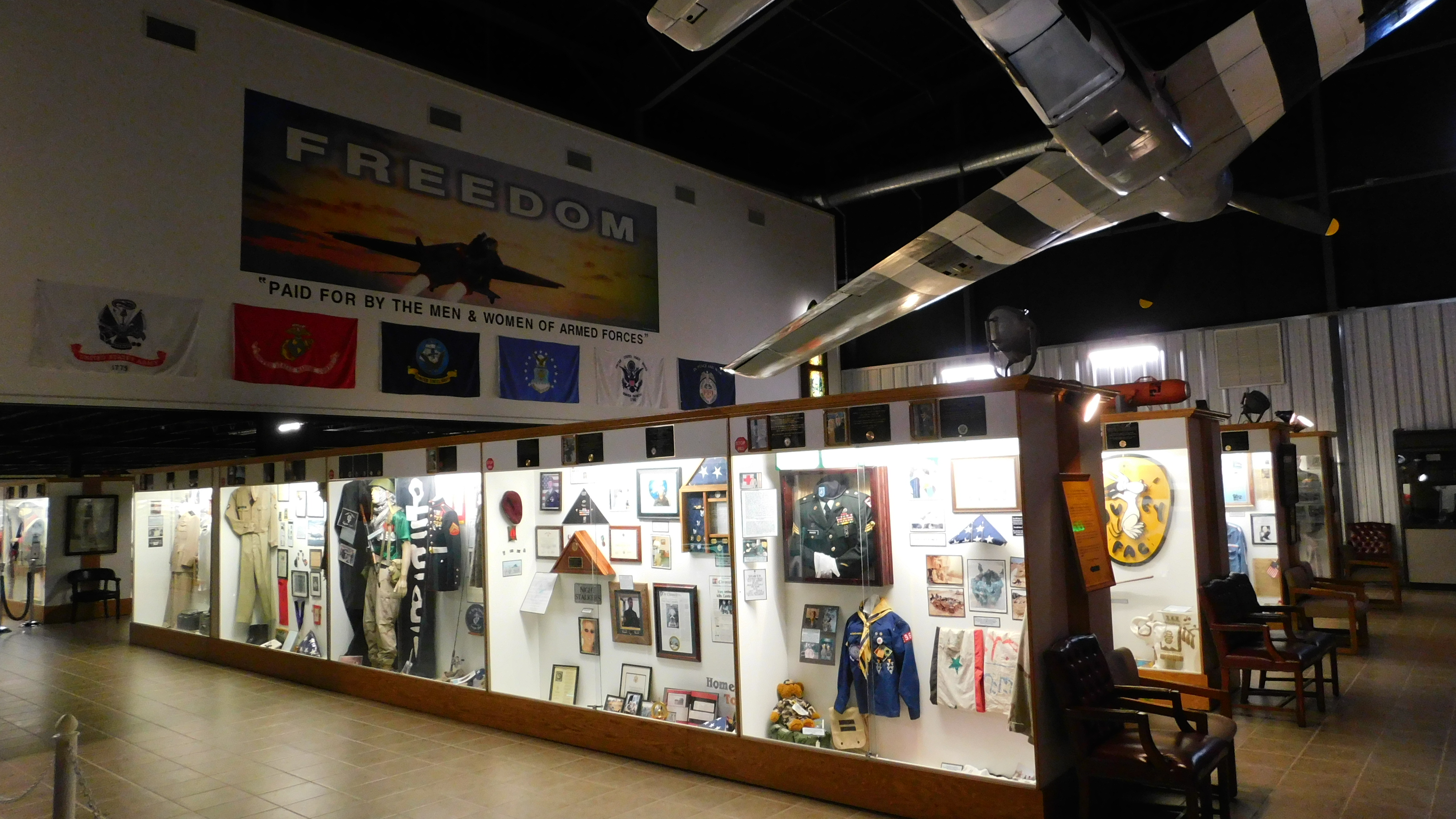
Section for 21st century engagements, 2026

=== Library and tours ===
The museum contains a 3,000-volume research library of military history, including a rare set of books known as Soldiers of the Great War, which lists all Americans who died during World War I. The museum hosts a video viewing room and visitors can participate in direct interactions and guided tours with visiting United States war veterans. (Note: The guided walkthrough can be extensive enough that museum staff advises visitors that it could take up three or four hours to complete the tour.) The facility also includes a "USO lounge" and gift shop.

== Charity and outreach ==
The Veterans Memorial Museum is home to an associated non-profit known as Veterans Journey Forward (VJF); the organization was formed in 2022. The VJF helps provide various services and outreach for veterans, including Veterans Administration (VA) benefits and counseling. As of 2025, the VJF has been of assistance to over 1,600 veterans and their families, including an estimated $5.5 million in disability benefits to veterans in Lewis County.

A local chapter of Quilts of Valor is based out of the museum. In February 2026, nine active service members received a handmade quilt during a ceremony. The chapter began in 2018.

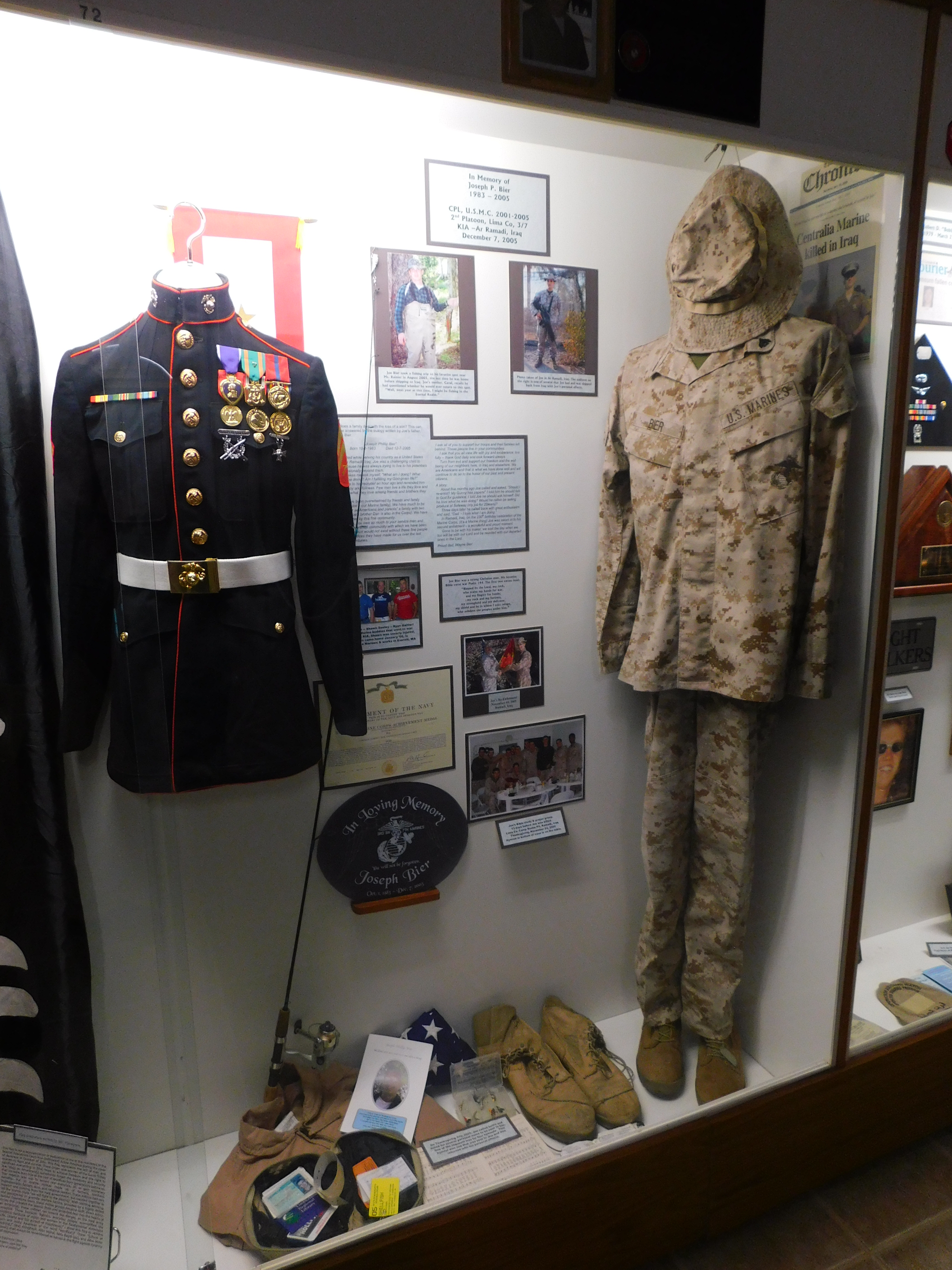
CPL Joseph P. Bier memorial, 2026

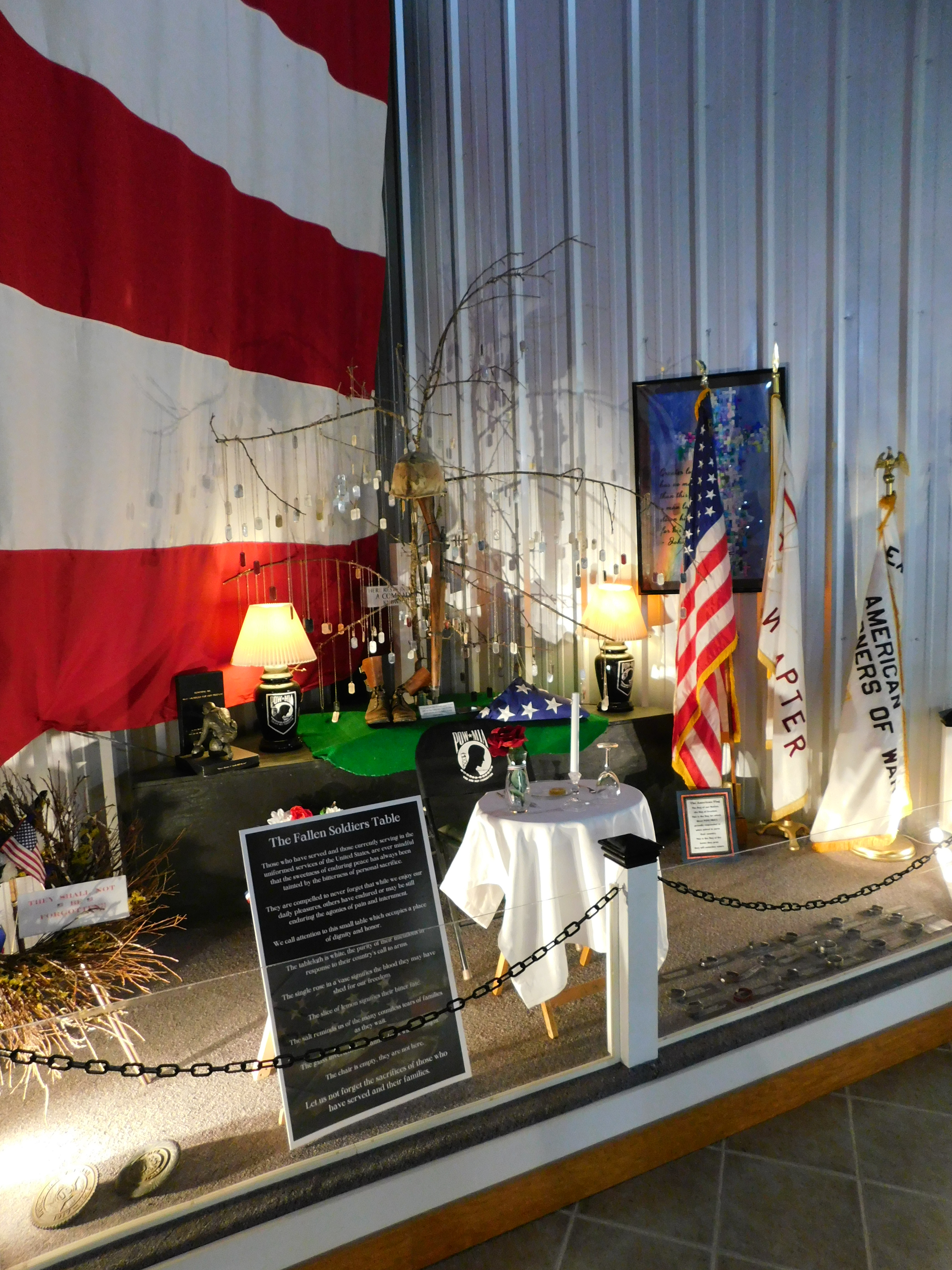
Fallen Soldiers Table, 2026

== Events and festivals ==
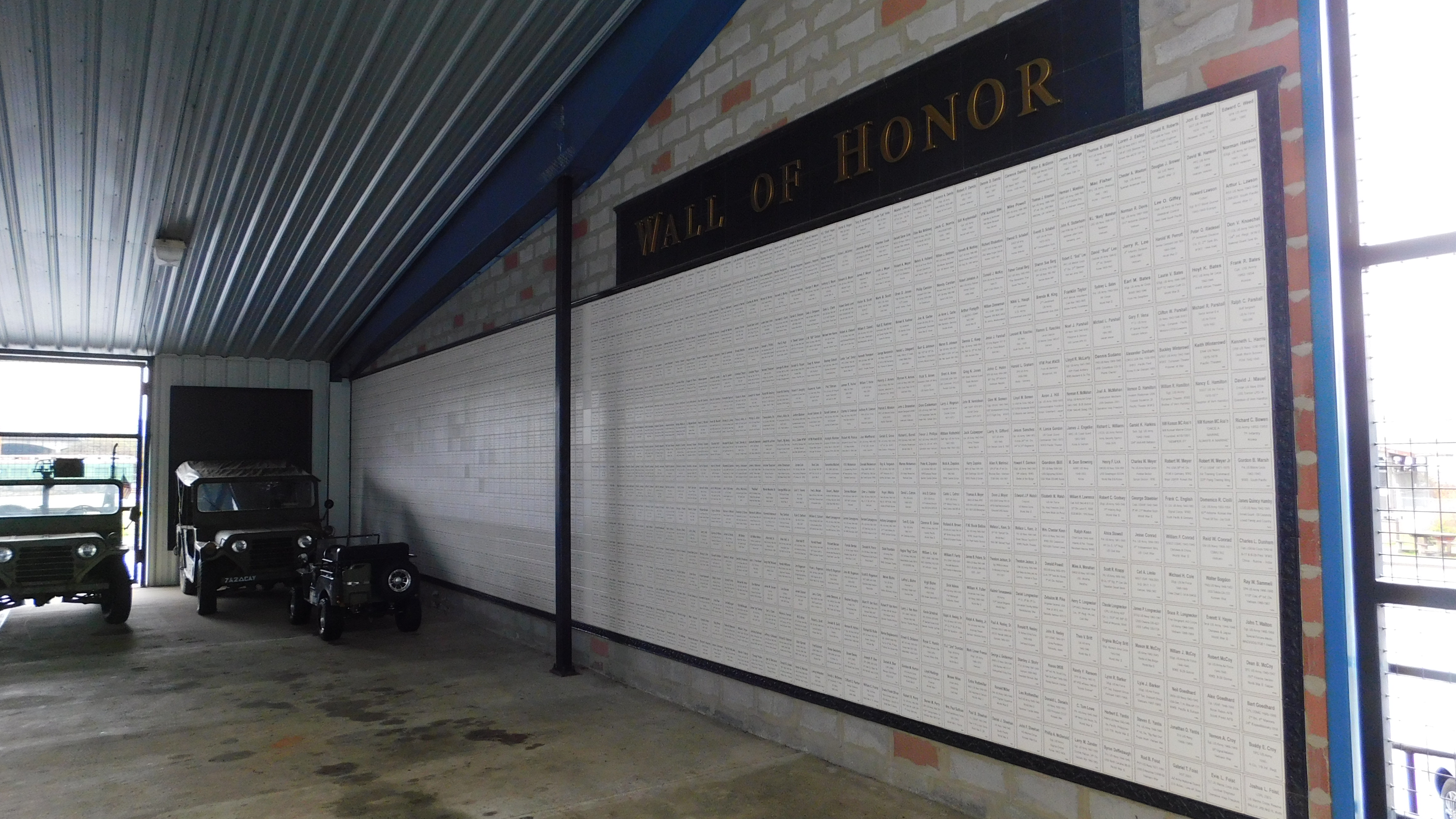
Wall of Honor, 2026

In order to raise funds for the museum during its formative years in Centralia, the staff hosted an annual "World War II Dinner Dance". The event showcased big band and swing music and guests often dressed in 1940s fashion or military uniforms of the time. Beginning in 1997, the Centralia museum also held an annual, "Pearl Harbor Survivor's Day" event where witnesses of the attack on Pearl Harbor shared their experiences.

The Vietnam Traveling Memorial Wall has been displayed at the museum, including in 2007 and 2014.

The museum has hosted an annual, late-summer "Rust or Shine Car Show and Music Festival" since 2015, becoming the biggest automobile show in the county. Funds are raised during the event for the operational costs of the museum as well as for veteran assistance groups, such as AMVETS, NineLine Veterans Services, and Veterans Journey Forward.

In cooperation with other organizations, the museum sponsors an annual American Civil War reenactment in the city. Taking place on a parcel of land on Tune Road, approximately 1.3 miles (2.1 km) from the museum, a reenactment in 2012 featured the Battle of Antietam.

The first annual Shades of Red, White & Blue Masquerade Gala, a fundraiser benefit for the museum, was held in November 2025. Money raised during the event is used to help offset costs of the various veterans assistance programs at the museum.

== See also ==
- Lewis County Historical Society and Museum
- List of museums in Washington (state)
- Vintage Motorcycle Museum
