= Lewis County Historical Society and Museum =

NRHP-listed site in Chehalis, Washington

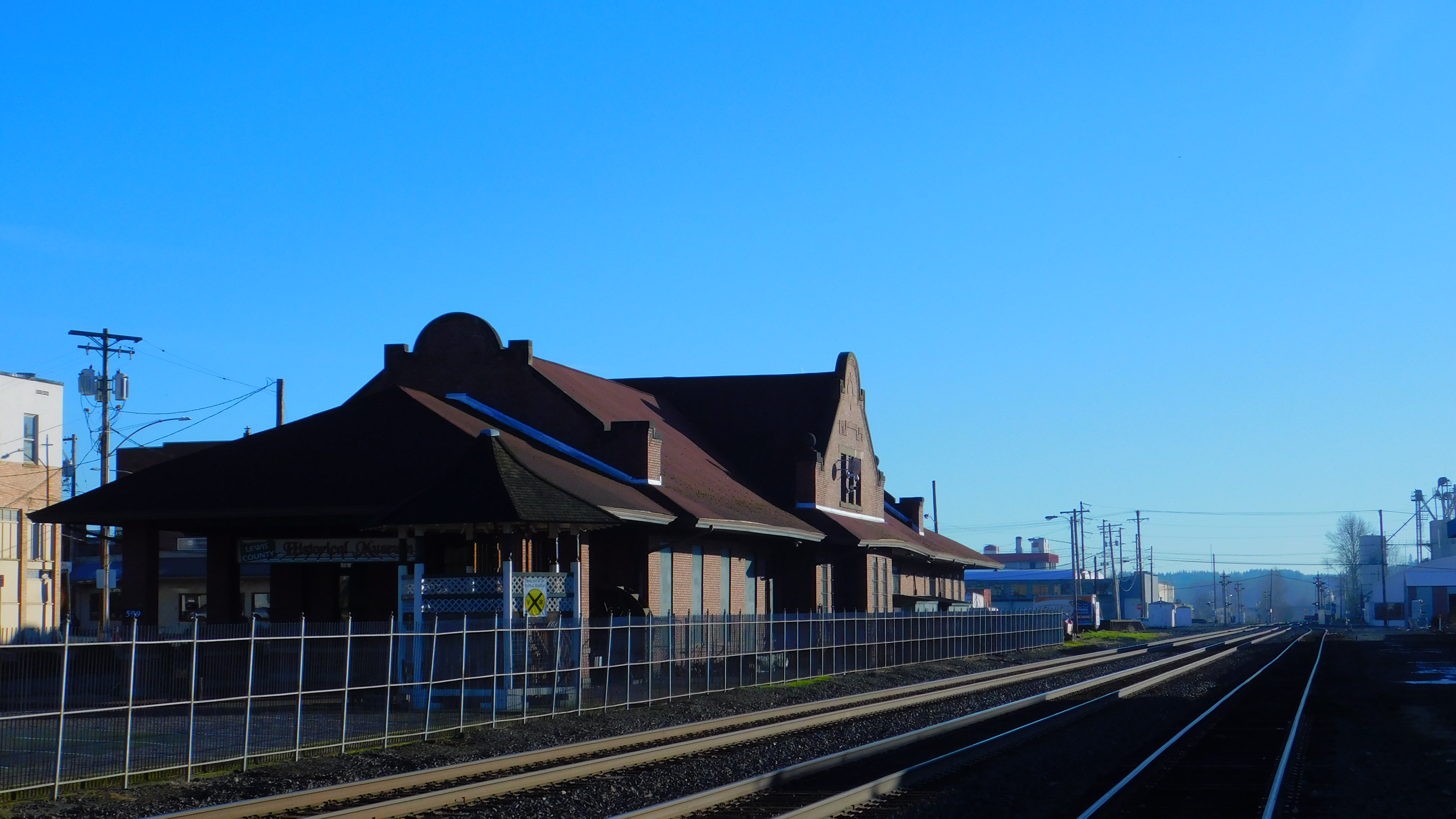
- Lewis County Historical Museum, 2022
- Former name: Burlington Northern Depot, Chehalis Union Depot, Northern Pacific Depot
- Established: October 7, 1978
- Location: Chehalis, Washington
- Coordinates: 46°39′56″N 122°58′18.3″W
- Type: Local museum, historic site
- Collection size: 4,600 square feet (430 m^{2})
- Parking: Parking lot
- Website: lewiscountymuseum.org

The Lewis County Historical Society and Museum is located in Chehalis, Washington. The museum is situated in the city's Burlington Northern Depot, listed on the National Register of Historic Places (NRHP) in 1974. The repository is located within the Chehalis Downtown Historic District and borders the Pennsylvania Avenue-West Side Historic District, both NRHP-listed locations.

The train station was constructed by the Northern Pacific Railroad in 1912 and opened with a dedication ceremony in January 1913. The depot became most commonly known as the Burlington Northern Depot and renamed as the Lewis County Historical Museum in 1975.

In February 1973, Burlington Northern closed the depot and ordered the historic Chehalis station to be demolished. Ongoing efforts and protests saved the structure, allowing the site to be used a local museum. The depot was leased to Lewis County in late-1975 for $1 per year. The building was renovated by the Lewis County Historical Society and several volunteers, officially opening as a county historical museum in September 1979.

The museum is under the oversight of the Lewis County Historical Society, which incorporated in 1965. The Lewis County Historical Museum has remained in operation since the 1970s despite funding difficulties and an embezzlement of the society's endowment fund in the late 2000s.

The 4,600-square-foot (430 m^{2}) space hosts permanent displays, most notably exhibits on pioneer life and indigenous culture and people, as well as special presentations tied to the county's past. Over 50,000 artifacts, which include audio recordings, interactive items, newspapers, photographs, and physical objects of historical importance, are stored within the museum or under its management. The original passenger waiting room houses the main exhibit space and the museum is known for a large-scale, working model train display of Lewis County. The site is a standard location for celebrations, events, and festivals pertaining to Chehalis and Lewis County.

== Background ==
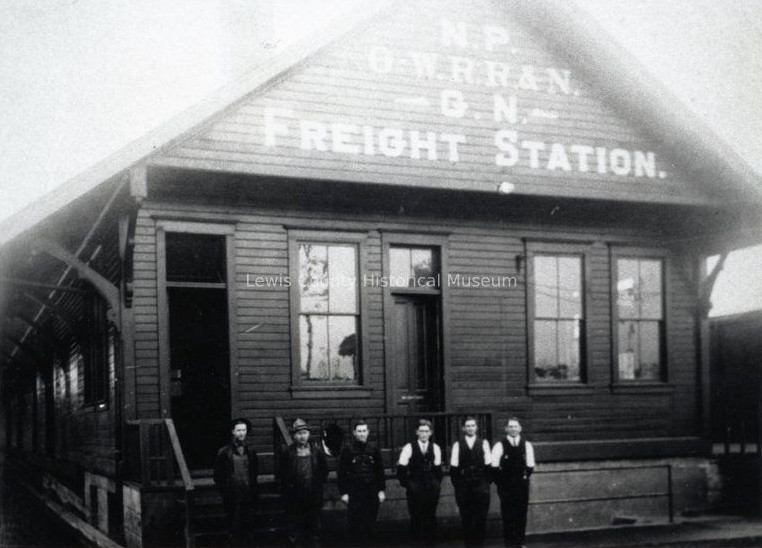
Northern Pacific Freight Station, early 1900s

A Northern Pacific Railway (NPR) railroad line through Chehalis, then known as Saundersville, was constructed in 1872 and 1873. A competition between an NPR station with Newaukum began. Chehalis residents began requesting a train station in 1872 by petition. John W. Sprague, an NPR official, denied the request, but he sent the petition to headquarters and allowed the returning train to drop off three railroad representatives in Chehalis rather than in Newaukum. A train conductor was offered money in exchange for a freight delivery directly to Chehalis and businessmen and residents in the city began flagging down trains which were required to stop after being flagged. The actions led to a regular train stop in Saundersville in 1874.

A wooden "regulation depot" was built by Northern Pacific in 1890. The depot was partially rebuilt in 1897. By the 1900s, the station had issues with injury concerns and dilapidation and was considered a "menace" a "dump", and "inadequate" and "too small" for the city. Improvement efforts throughout the decade were attempted.

The construction of the Northern Pacific Depot was publicly announced on April 4, 1912. The station was completed in the late summer of 1912 and an official dedication ceremony was held on January 23, 1913.

=== Closure and planned demolition ===
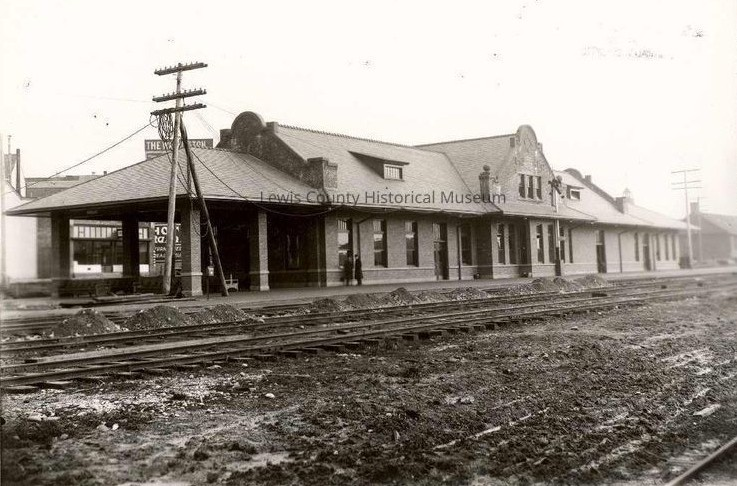
Northern Pacific Depot, c. 1912

In March 1970, a large merger of several railroad companies led to the creation of Burlington Northern (BNR). The new company, due to "economic reasons", began closing depots and stations in smaller communities. Passengers were permanently diverted in early 1972 from Chehalis to Centralia and the Chehalis station had begun to merge their operations and employees with Centralia beginning in January 1973. The Chehalis Depot was officially closed on February 15, 1973, with plans for demolition under orders from Burlington Northern.

Interest in acquiring the depot was undertaken by the Chehalis Parking Improvement Club which, at the time, leased spaces in two parking lots adjacent to the station. Demolition attempts by Burlington Northern either continued or were postponed over during the mid-1970s.

=== Demolition cancelled ===
A petition to save the station was undertaken by a city-wide canvass led by the Committee of Concerned Citizens for the Preservation of the Depot. The appeal was signed by over 1,000 people. The efforts were considered an important step that helped the station be added to both the Washington State Heritage Register and the National Register of Historic Places in 1974.

Demolition was postponed again into the summer of 1975 as the site was beginning to be finalized for its use by the city and the Lewis County Historical Society. Plans were continually waylaid under various concerns, including financial solvency, Burlington Northern's liability, and the county's requirement that the building was to be of use only as a museum.

Burlington Northern officially announced on July 11, 1975, that the historic station would not be demolished. An interim agreement was reached that Lewis County could purchase the depot, assuming the county fulfilled promises to undertake safety and improvement concerns the railroad company had stated over the previous years. The deal was officially signed in September 29, the depot allowed to be leased to the county. Burlington Northern specified requirements that it be used only as a museum and that the county must erect a fence between the railroad tracks and the platform. The original lease, signed on November 3, 1975, and spanning for 20 years, could not be cancelled and required a $1 annual payment; afterwards, the lease could be renewed annually in perpetuity and cancelled only if the county no longer wanted the building under their oversight. (Note: The 1975 lease agreement did not cover the adjoining parking lots.)

== Lewis County Historical Society and Museum ==
=== Early history ===
The first proposal for a county museum was approved and adopted by the Lewis County commissioner board in September 1942. A collection of artifacts and historical documents were to be located at the Lewis County Savings and Loan building in Chehalis, overseen by an association of the same name. While the county would not own the museum at first, it declared that once the repository was proven to be successful and of value, the county was to take ownership. (Note: Sources have not yet been found to verify if the 1942 museum proposal was started and if so, how successful and valuable it was.) By 1945, plans changed as a museum and historical society steering committee proposed a county tax on pinball and slot machines. The funds were to be used to construct a county historical building at the Southwest Washington Fairgrounds.

Another recommendations for a county historical society began in May 1955 and the Lewis County Historical Society (LCHS) was officially formed in October 1964; directors and officers of the group were elected in December. (Note: Initial annual membership dues of the Lewis County Historical Society in 1965 were $3, with an elevated subscription of $5. A lifetime membership could be purchased for $50.) The first charter meeting, open to the public, was held on January 21, 1965 (Note: Additional reporting mentions the first charter meeting of the LCHS as occurring on January 25, 1965.) with a membership enrollment of 145. The first two projects undertaken by the LCHS were an effort to place markers at sites of early schools in Lewis County no longer in existence, and a plan to rededicate the Fort Borst blockhouse. By April, membership more than tripled to 396 people (Note: Sources vary on the maximum extent of early membership to the LCHS, often ranging between 350 and 400 members. See sources in the section.) and 22 committees were formed to gather and study information on Lewis County history.

The Lewis County Historical Society and Museum incorporated in 1965 and began searching for a museum location by September 1966 despite waning enthusiasm, decreased membership, and difficulty in organizing both the society and the gathered historical information. At the time of the depot's proposed demolition, the LCHS was located in a residence known as the Cory House (Note: Sources sometimes refer to the Cory House under the spelling, "Corey". See sources in the section for the discrepancy.) on Washington Avenue in the city's Hillside Historic District, a National Register of Historic Places site.

The museum began after Dr. and Mrs. Arthur Cory donated their mid-1920s 10,000-square-foot (930 m^{2}) home to the society in October 1966; the offer to the society was dependent on the structure's use as a county museum. The Cory's had been residents of Chehalis since 1903. Arthur was a prominent banker and state representative, also undertaking numerous civil service roles within the community. After remodeling of the home, the Lewis County Historical Museum opened on November 2, 1968. Visitors on opening day were estimated at 500 people and the museum was announced to be open every Thursday afternoon or by appointment.

By the end of the first year of operations, the Cory House museum recorded 4,000 visitors and approximately 500 citizens donated at least one item to the society. The basement featured displays on agriculture and timber, as well as an "old-timey" kitchen. The main floor featured exhibits of various historical collectables along with fashion and home interior styles seen over the years. The area also included two post office counters from discontinued post offices in Grand Mound and the former community of Eagleton near Bunker. The top floor contained bedroom displays of an earlier era, and a beginning form of the society's research library.

The society, looking to expand due to the cramped nature and poor location of the Cory House, as well as its lack of accessibility for disabled and senior citizen visitors, immediately began to research the historical importance of the depot. Despite railroad officials lacking confidence that a museum could work, as well as deeming the depot to unsafe to be a museum due to its immediate proximity to the tracks, the LCHS pushed forward, reaching out and involving Burlington Northern, the Chehalis community, and local businesses.

=== Restoration ===
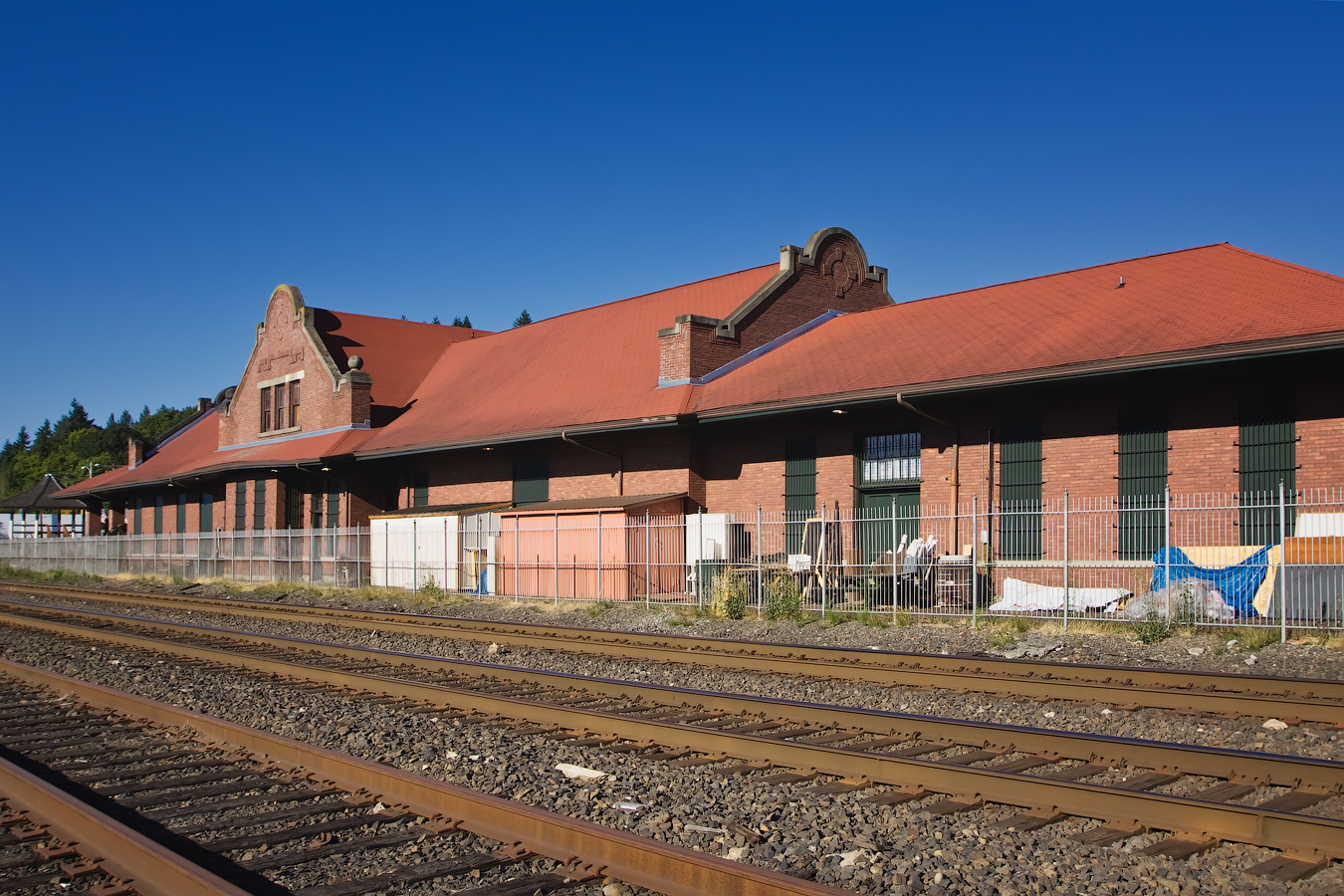
View from railroad tracks, 2011

The Chehalis Depot had been vacant since 1973 and atrophy of the structure was substantial. The city council approved a renovation plan by LCHS member and University of Washington student, Cynthia Elise Botch, (Note: Cynthia Elise Botch was studying interior architecture, choosing the Chehalis depot as a class project. A member of the LCHS, Minnie Lingreen, suggested the idea to Botch.) in July 1975, leading to almost $115,000 in grants and funding from various parties. Participating agencies and organizations included the Comprehensive Employee Training Act (CETA), the Economic Development Administration (EDA), and the LCHS which used $13,000 of its own funds that were marked for upgrades to the station's electrical and plumbing systems. A Lewis County Public Works director of the county's building department, Dennis Sabin, volunteered to remodel parts of the depot at no taxpayer expense.

As the initial restoration did not include renovating the interior, a pledge drive began in July 1977 (Note: A formal kickoff of the $50,000 pledge drive was a community breakfast held on July 22, 1977.) to raise $50,000 for such needs as a new heating system and display cases. Students at Green Hill School manufactured and erected a wrought iron fence. With less than two weeks left to raise the money, the drive had raised only $10,000; the low amount was considered to be due to the confusion over the various methods of funding being sought. With a late push, but ultimately falling short, the goal was finally achieved after interest on the deposited funds were added.

Into 1977, the efforts were overseen by Botch and included additional work such as the system installations for security and temperature control; by June, work to reconfigure the interior footprint to better suit a museum layout was still under process. Landscaping, replacing walkways, "rejuvenating" the brick façade and the construction of displays were additional parts of the overall remodel. The roof was replaced by the same month, the labor undertaken by the CETA who also contributed to several other efforts within the facility. In combination with the slow or delayed releases of funds that prevented the completion of several exterior needs, including repairs to the platform and soffits, the opening of the museum was ultimately pushed past several promised dates, such as a planned United States Bicentennial celebration in 1976. A retaining wall on Front Street, which was higher in elevation than the depot, was built of sheet metal and planted with ivy beginning in October 1977.

Funding to fully complete the restoration were figured as low as $100,000 but reached as high as $175,000. Although most costs were considered to be covered by donations of Chehalins and Lewis county residents, additional monies were made available for the restoration via a combination of several county, state, and federal programs. Funds did not cover all the anticipated renovations, requiring a scale of work to be smaller in scope. The monetary constraints did not allow the LCHS to purchase the historic Doty Bridge in 1976, which was under threat of demolition.

During the depot's restoration, residents throughout the county began donating items of historical interest to the LCHS. Keepsakes included clothing and textiles, farm equipment and tools, journals and magazines, maps, photographs, and a scale replica of Fort Borst. Several memorial donations were made to the Chehalis Depot Restoration Fund. An open house was held in May 1977 to show local citizens an early display version of the collected donations. Plaques honoring donors were introduced in August. Affixed to an interior wall, people who donated above $100 received a bronze, "Museum Associates" honor while those who gave above $500 were bestowed with a silver, "Friends" plaque. Any patron who contributed above $1,000 were awarded an inscripted gold plaque under the title, "Museum Patrons".

=== Opening and dedication ===
The former Northern Pacific Depot was officially renamed as the Lewis County Historical Society and Museum, with the organization granted rights to the facility under the $1 per year lease signed in 1975.

An early dedication was held on October 7, 1978, and the Cory House location closed ten days later. Lewis County did not declare the renovations as complete until December 27, 1978. The addition of exhibits and displays were begun in early 1979 under the oversight of the museum's first director, Jill Kangas. The museum celebrated its grand reopening on September 18, 1979, with a five-day festival. During the first week, the museum recorded approximately 2,500 visitors.

=== Late 20th century ===
Fundraisers were necessary in 1992 and 1995 to help offset operating costs and a lack of "permanent funding". The 1992 drive led to a rewrite of the museum's bylaws helping to improve several accounting and financial issues. However, a continuing reliance on limited membership dues and small grants from the county and the Twin Cities, (Note: Centralia and Chehalis are commonly referred to as the Twin Cities due to their immediate location to one another. See city articles for further information.) remained a difficulty, often putting the museum's ability to remain open in jeopardy. Approximately 80% of the operating costs were covered by donations, dues, and interest from the society's endowment fund; remaining income was derived by a local motel and hotel tax.

By 1999, Burlington Northern was offering to sell the building for approximately $200,000, but the society did not have funds to purchase the depot at the time. The museum was struggling financially and the interior, with boarded windows, was described by the LCHS president as "dismal" and "dreary".

=== 21st century ===
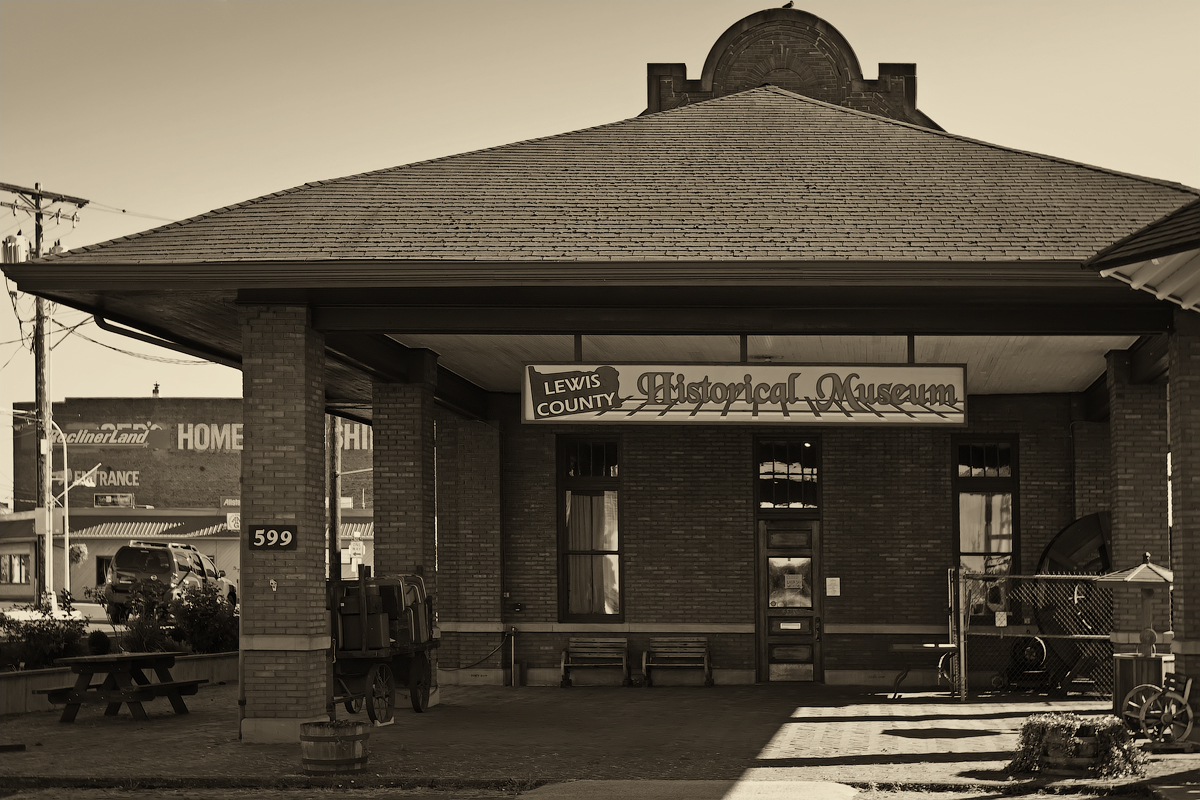
Main entrance, 2011

Due to a lack of funding, volunteer participation, and three directors in three years, the museum struggled in the early 2000s despite a subscription base of 450 members.

The museum began a remodeling effort in 2003 known as the "Renovating the Past for the Future" project. A first phase, with an estimated cost of $35,000 which was mostly funded by donations, focused on expanding rooms dedicated to the local styles of the Victorian era. A second facet was to build a vintage town square display; a final phase was to fully complete both efforts. Additional upgrades to lighting and the refreshing of millwork was also part of the project. Meant to upgrade the presentation of the site while creating the museum as a "vintage destination", the attempted remodel was considered necessary by the acting director at the time as the depot had "an ugly frame around it".

An executive director of the museum was found to have been partly responsible (Note: The loss of nearly the entirety of the LCHS endowment fund discovered after the 2008-2010 embezzlement was at first thought to be entirely Knapp's doing. Investigations later lowered the accusation against Knapp to $200,000. Ongoing investigation of the incident indicated that numerous people had access to the endowment account, and coupled with poor accounting practice, made it difficult to prove that Knapp stole more than $95,000.) for the loss of $460,000 from the museum's endowment fund beginning in January 2008 to the end of 2010. The accused, Debbie Knapp, shifted funds into a separate account, using the money for personal use. Knapp was accused of spending a total of $100,000 of the organization's funds, which included excessive salary payments to herself. The executive board was replaced after a membership vote in November 2011 and Knapp was arrested in December. The museum, at the time of her arrest, was left with $2,000 and over $13,000 in debts which were in part paid off in part due to a charitable loan from a local bank; the loan, which was also used to purchase computers to assist with scanning historical documents and photographs, was paid back by early 2012.

The museum was closed, with the doors locked, for several weeks in November 2011 during the Chehalis police department-led investigation against Knapp, which included an audit of accounting records from the beginning of 2008. The site was reopened on December 1 with a ribbon cutting ceremony. Employees were also temporarily laid off during the time due to the financial constraints caused by the crime.

Knapp pled guilty in May 2013 and served 8 months of a maximum 14-month sentence. She was ordered to pay back over $95,000. (Note: Wages that Knapp earned while being incarcerated during the trial were garnished in efforts to settle her debt to the museum. The amount clawed back was $30.) The disorganized bookkeeping of the museum masked attempts to prove that Knapp may have stolen additional funds.

The endowment fund was "resurrected" in early 2014 with two large donations totaling $149,000. The estate of June Clare, a longtime Chehalis resident, was responsible for $125,000 of the new funds; an exhibit room was named in her honor. The endowment was reconfigured by the end of 2017, creating a separate investment account. Withdrawals on the endowment was to be restricted and incoming donations were allowed to be specifically authorized only to be used to generate interest returns for museum operations. The president of the LCHS board stated at the time that removing money from the endowment would "take nearly an act of God".

A documentary, focusing on both Twin City depots at their respective 100th anniversaries, was filmed by KBTC-TV in 2012. Since 2019, the building has been hosting a live camera feed of the train tracks behind the building. Approximately 100 viewers in February 2025 reported an assault of a woman that was being shown live on the camera feed; the suspect fled soon thereafter.

== Geography ==
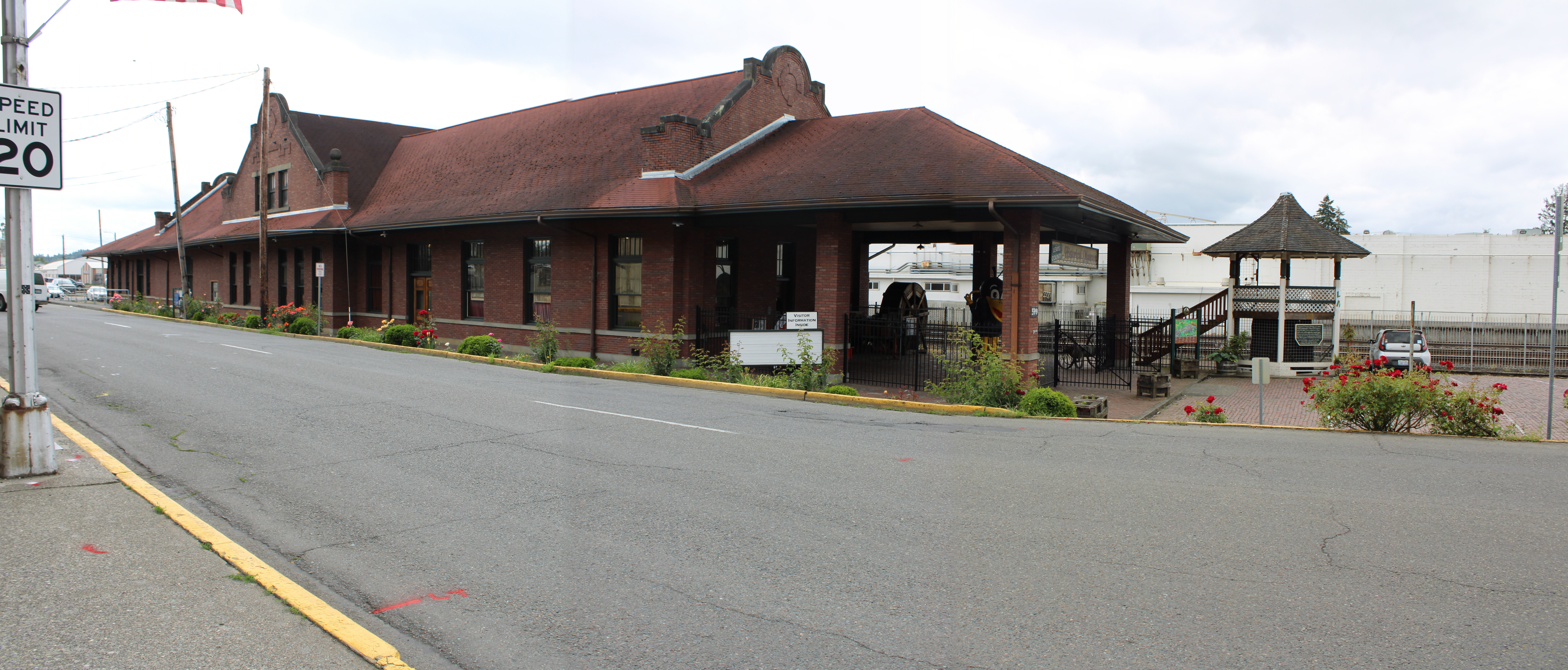
Panorama, 2024

The museum is located within the Burlington Norther Depot in Chehalis, Washington. The building is situated at the northwest end of the National Register of Historic Places-listed Chehalis Downtown Historic District at the intersection of West Street and Front Street. (Note: The NRHP nomination form lists the address vaguely as, "off U.S. 99/WA 1".) Immediately to the west is the city's Pennsylvania Avenue-West Side Historic District, a listed district on the NRHP.

== Operations and ownership ==
At the time of the NRHP nomination, the building was considered privately owned by Burlington Northern though in the process of "public acquisition". The depot and museum building, as of 2012, is owned by Lewis County and maintenance falls under their jurisdiction; the county does not charge the LCHS rent for use of the facility.

The Lewis County Historical Society is considered a non-profit organization, with the Lewis County Historical Museum listed as a separate non-profit corporation. The combined entity's mandate is a dedication to the preservation and history of Lewis County. The society, privately held, and its operations are funded usually by annual memberships, income generated at the museum, or from grants between the Twin Cities of Centralia and Chehalis. An endowment fund, funded by a variety of memorial contributions and subscriptions, provides long-term financial reliability.

== Museum displays and features ==
The museum hosts several distinct rooms and areas pertaining to the history of railroads, timber, Native Americans, and early pioneer life in Chehalis. The building also includes a research library and a model train display. The museum's gift shop provides books on local and county history. Initial components of the depot permanently reside in the museum, which includes a passenger bench and water fountain, as well as the original ticket window. Exhibits in the main gallery are changed approximately every six months and some items donated to the museum are required to be on permanent display. Guided tours of the museum, as well as instructional classes on early crafts and homemaking, are offered.

The museum exhibit space was listed, in 2000, as 4,600 square feet (430 m^{2}) and by 2003, the museum held a collection touching on over 50,000 historical subjects in the county as well as a repertory of 15,000 photographs. The cache is focused extensively on pioneer and family histories in the area, compiled from 35,000 records obtained from cemetery, census, marriage, and obituary documents. Oral records of early pioneers are recorded on tape and are stored at the museum. In August 2024, the museum opened a free, online database containing possibly more than 35,000 photographs from its collection.

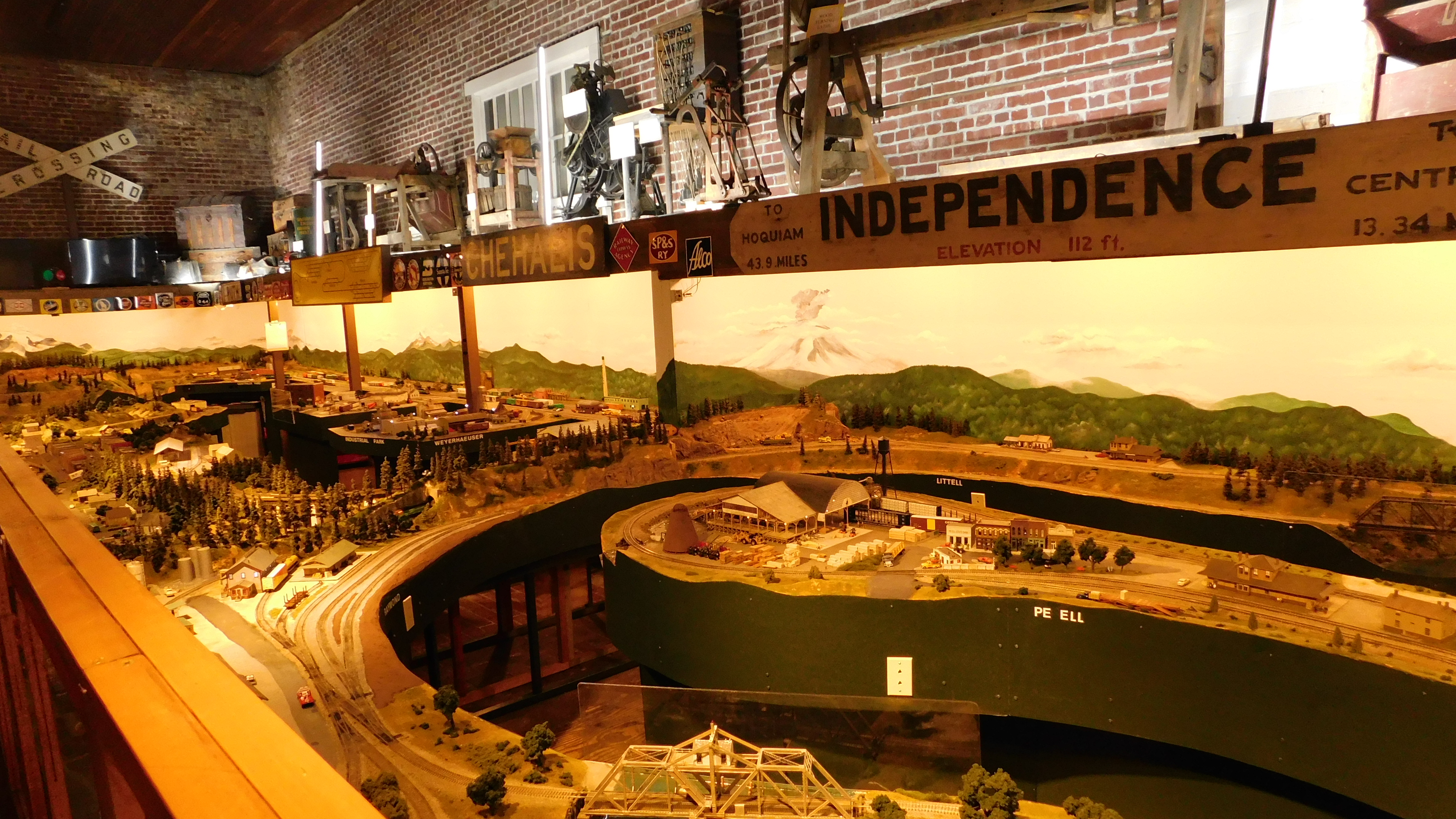
Model train display, 2025

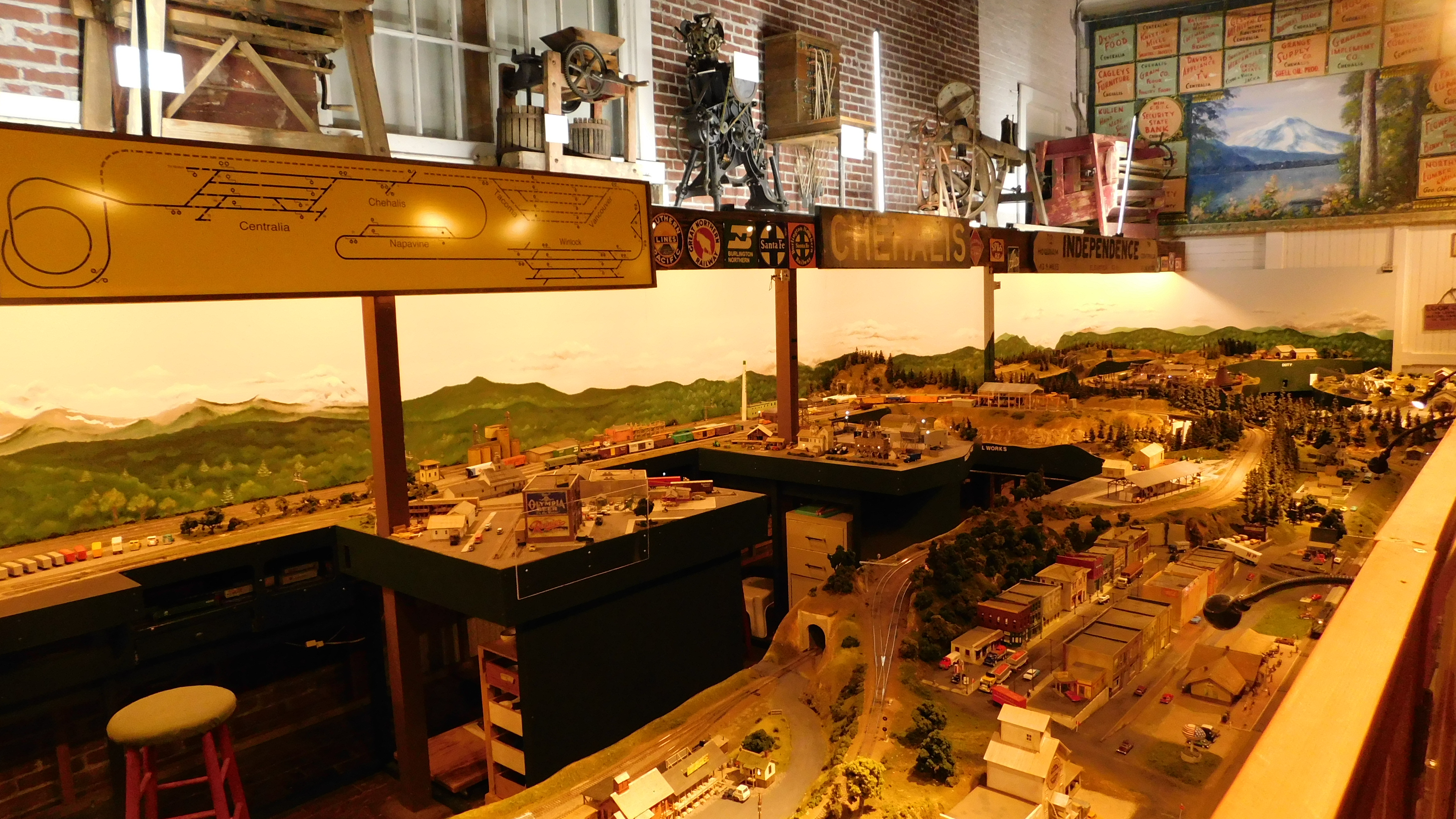
Model train display, alternate view, 2025

The most recognized display is an expansive, working model train exhibit that was unveiled at a free event in 2005. Completed in 2012 under the Lewis County Model Railroad Club, the 15 ft × 36 ft (4.6 m × 11.0 m) miniature depicts a condensed version of Lewis County and the 600-square-foot (56 m^{2}) space includes a variety of artifacts and photographs detailing railroad history in the county.

The main room, once the passenger waiting area, is used for exhibits and displays, some rotated based on local festivities or historical perspectives. The primary gallery includes areas focusing on antiques, such as clothes, dolls, and quilts, and has had displays on "hometown baseball", an early-1900s second hand store, and a one-room school. A notable display, known as the "Home Sweet Home" exhibit, features a laundry porch with items intended for interactive use. A permanent art gallery was created in 2015 in the front room; the exhibit is in partnership with ARTrails, a county-wide arts initiative.

A second gallery, known as Gallery II and the Indian Room, features a dugout canoe, indigenous crafts including baskets woven by Mary Kiona, a diorama on longhouses, and a tribute to Roy I. Rochon Wilson. An archive of the recorded history of Lewis County is located in Gallery III, the research library. The room contains Donation Land Claim records, written history and journals of early county pioneers, as well as local newspapers from as early as 1884. Several display areas include a blacksmithing shop and mercantile exhibit, while other sections focus on the region's farming, mining, and timber backgrounds. An interactive area spanning two rooms feature typewriters, tools, and a water pump, and was opened in April 1997. The venue's attic space stores numerous, donated items not readily inserted into permanent or focused exhibits but have, at times, been part of temporary showings of the eclectic or history on pioneer life.

Three exhibits pertaining to the Centralia Tragedy have been held at the museum. The first, containing documents and photographs, was unveiled in November 1994. An exhibit in 2003 was built to honor the county's early law and justice history, with attention on the Armistice Day Riot. A temporary exhibit in honor of the 100th anniversary of the Centralia Massacre was on display through the latter-half of 2019. The “probably the most controversial display ever” showcased a looped, 43-second film that was recorded on the day after the Armistice Riot; the event also displayed photos pertaining to the legal proceedings in the aftermath, and numerous other artifacts, including newspaper clippings and American Legion and IWW paraphernalia.

In addition to Gallery II, the museum has hosted several exhibits on local and regional indigenous history, including an eight-month long feature in the main gallery titled, "Two Rivers, Two People". The event, beginning in late-2000, focused on the history of both the Chehalis and Cowlitz people which included artifacts and photographs.

Retrospectives have spanned several topics and genres pertinent to the county. The history of the KELA (AM) radio station and its founder, J. Elroy McCaw, was displayed during an exhibit in mid-1996. A tribute exhibit, known as "Women's History: HER-itage Celebration", was held during Women's History Month in 2003. Focusing on "women's contributions to society, culture and history", the event displayed historical perspectives of prominent Lewis County women, such as Matilda (Mary) Jackson and the matriarch of Chehalis, Eliza Tynan Saunders Barrett. Women of national and international note were also featured. The suffrage movement and women's roles during World War II were noted components of the retrospective. Artifacts found during a military-led excavation at Centralia's Army National Guard Armory on Seminary Hill were part of a display in late-2019. Items included connections to the site of nearby historic Grace Seminary and Centralia General Hospital.

Several World War II retrospectives have taken place at the museum. A temporary exhibit begun in July 1998 and titled, "Hardships and Heartstrings: Stories from the Homefront During World War II", focused on the county and local war effort as well as the difficulties experienced by those who remained stateside. An event known as "Remembrance Day", honoring the 75th anniversary of Lewis County's beginning involvement in the internment of Japanese Americans during World War II, was held at the museum on June 3, 2017. A permanent display of the historical moment was added to the depot's collection. A plaque with the inscription, “Time has revealed the injustice of your experience, which we regret. We admire your loyalty, patriotism and dedication to this nation”, was also dedicated to Lewis County citizens who left to the camps via the Chehalis depot. Japanese-Americans, given Army identification tags that were numbered and yellow, were shipped to Tule Lake War Relocation Center on June 2, 1942, one of the first groups in the nation to do so. A follow-up exhibit and program, in cooperation with the Japanese American Museum of Oregon was held five years later.

The 100th anniversary of the Chehalis depot in 2012 involved several events and exhibits. A weekend car show in May, titled as "100 Years of Transportation", showcased vintage automobiles and transportation in the early 1900s. The festivities were held in conjunction with local car enthusiasts and the Vintage Motorcycle Museum, located in the downtown district's Hotel Washington at the time. A "100 Years of Technology" event, focusing on logging equipment, was held later that same month.

Notable artifacts in the museum's collection include an M3 Stuart tank, which was acquired in 1982 and was displayed at the site until 2003. The mobile weapon was moved to the city's Veterans Memorial Museum; a disagreement over ownership of the tank is unresolved due to a lack of paperwork. A vintage horse-drawn carriage that was part of a display at the Joseph Borst House was donated by the city of Centralia to the museum in 2017. A maple and yellow cedar violin, crafted in 1912 by Calvin Lemuel Young, a logger and Chehalis resident at the time, was donated to the museum in 2024. The instrument was used in a Washington Old Time Fiddlers Association performance at the museum as part of a "homecoming" ceremony for the musical artifact.

Exhibits and features at Lewis County Historical Museum

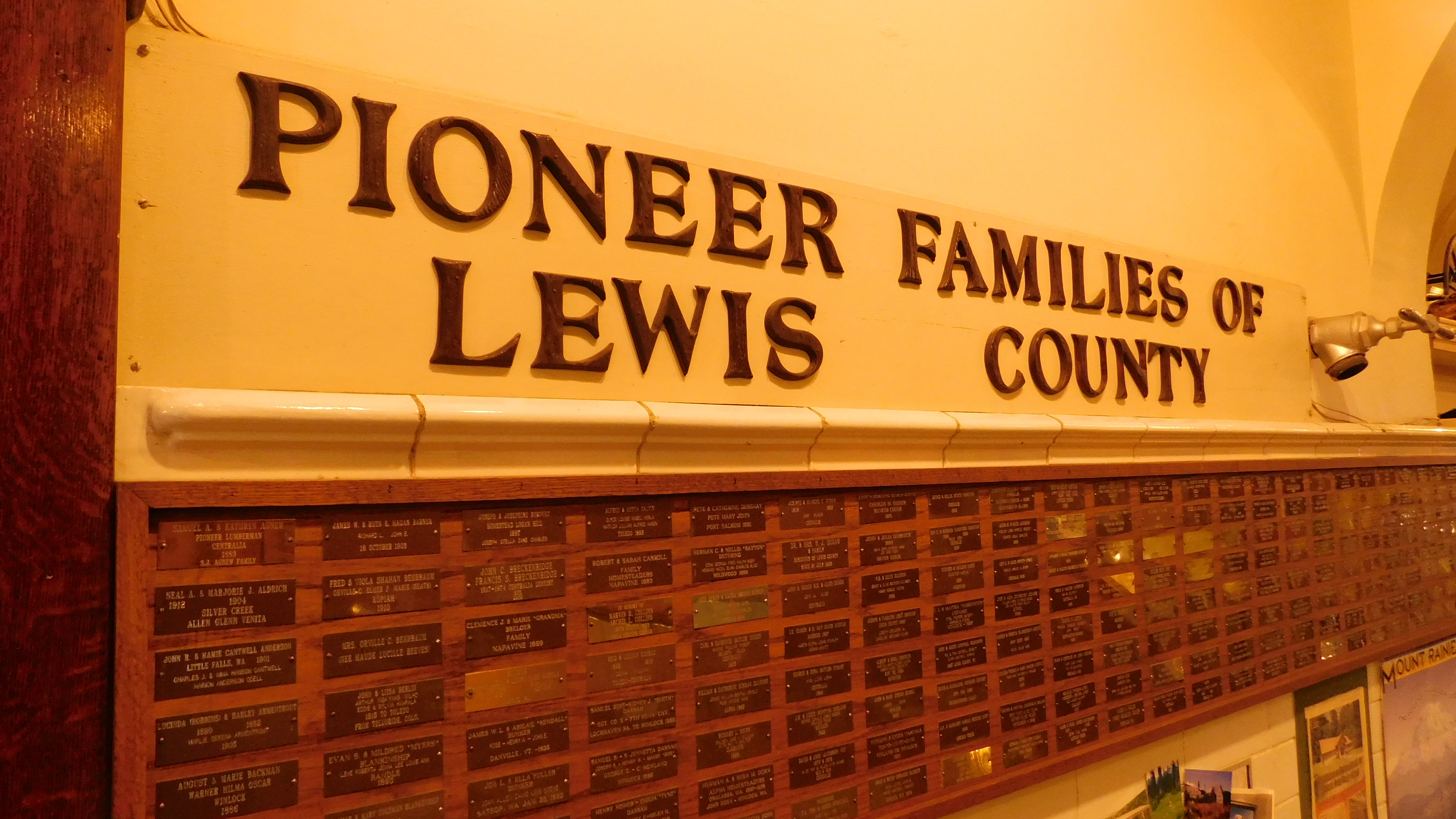
Honor wall, 2025

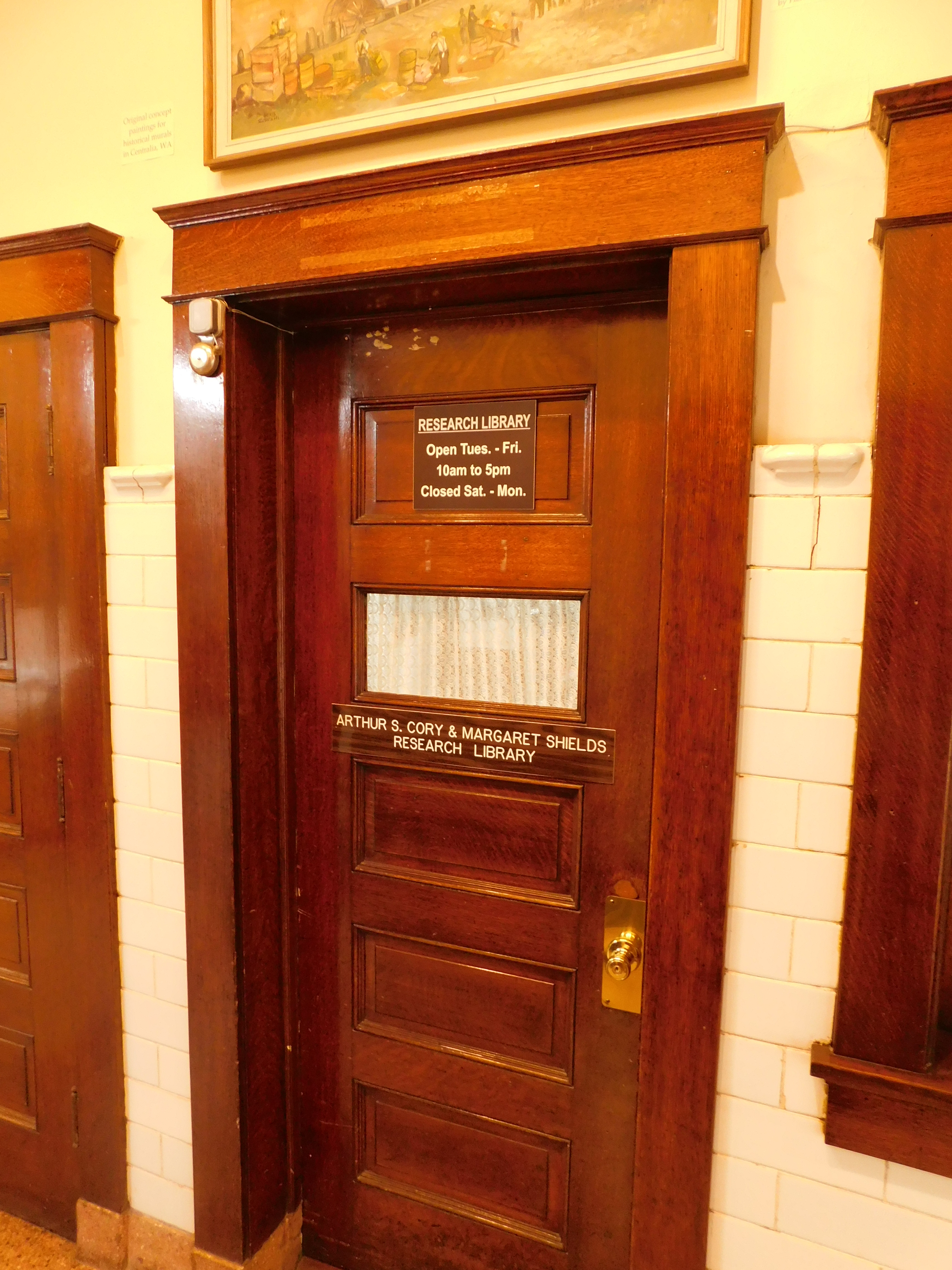
Research library, 2025

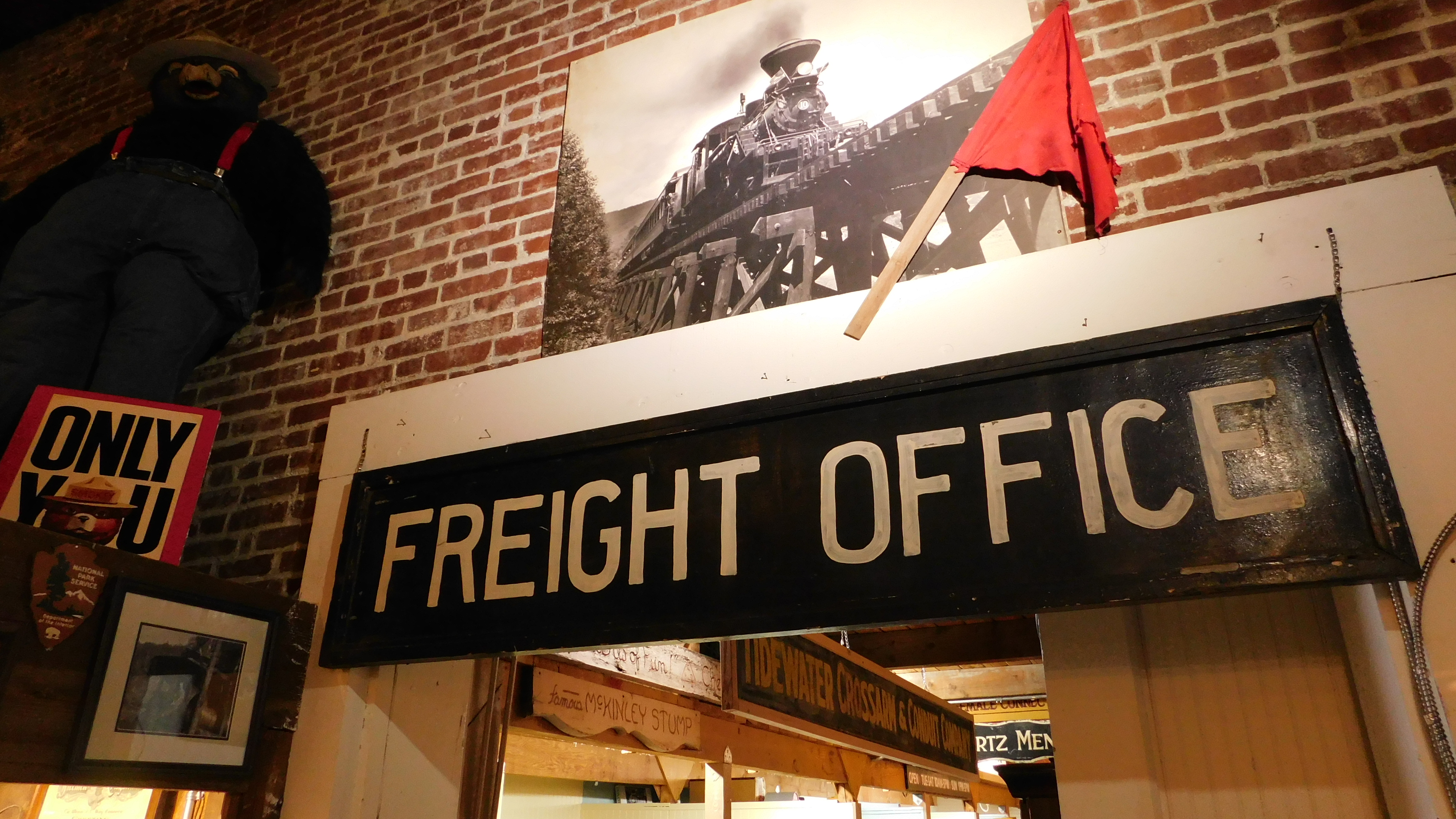
Display, model train room, 2025

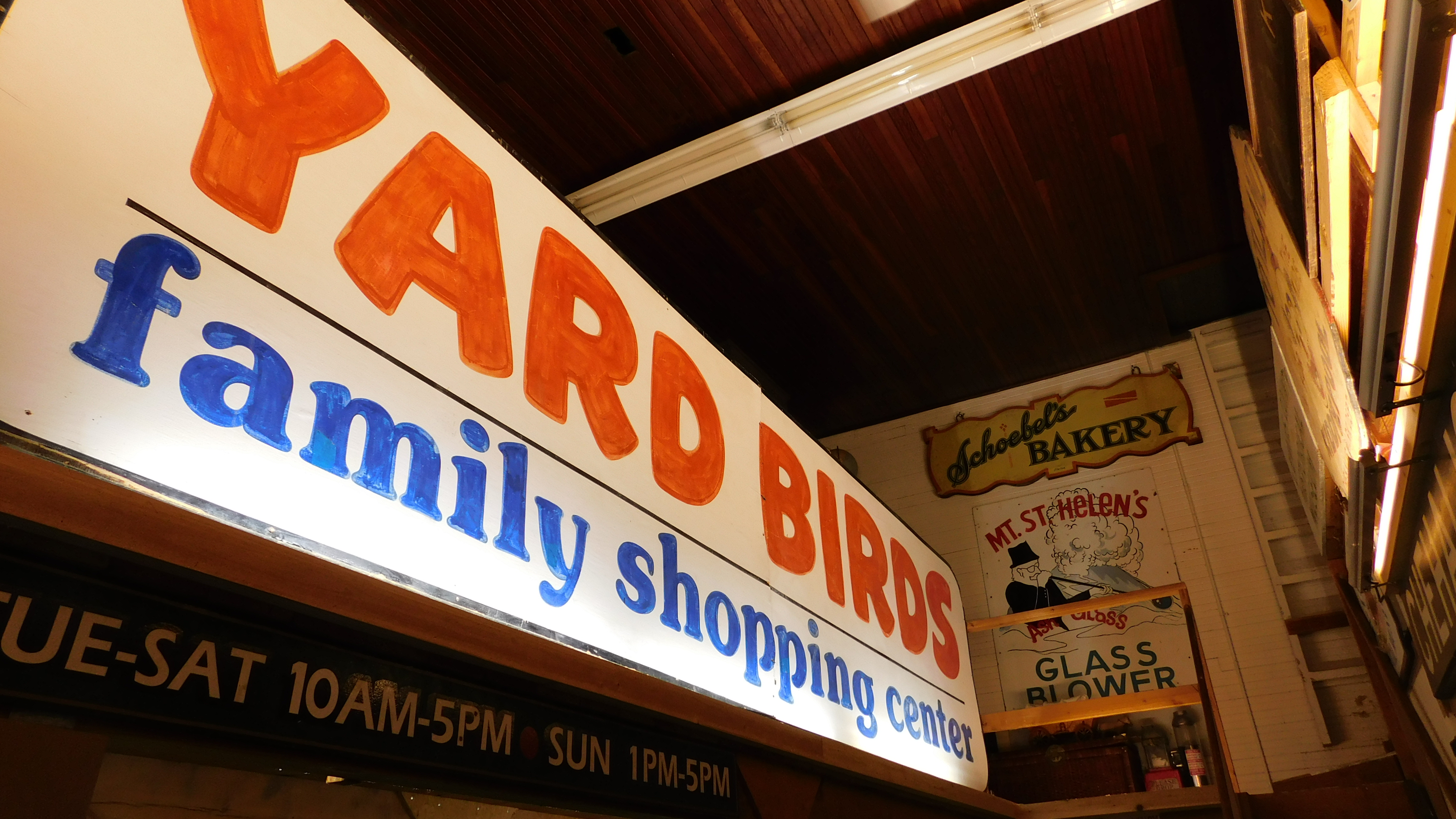
Business signs, 2025

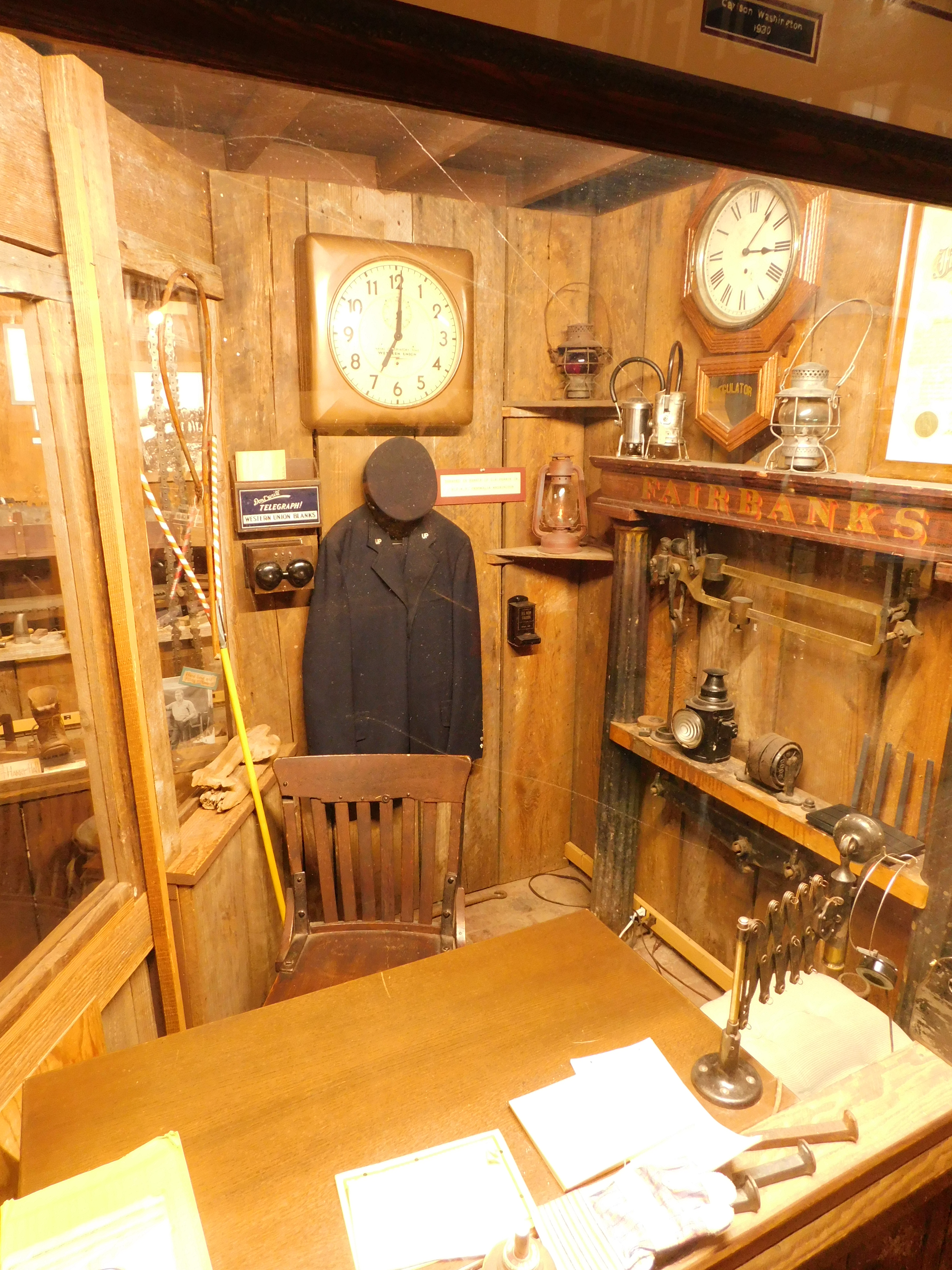
Telegraph office display, 2025

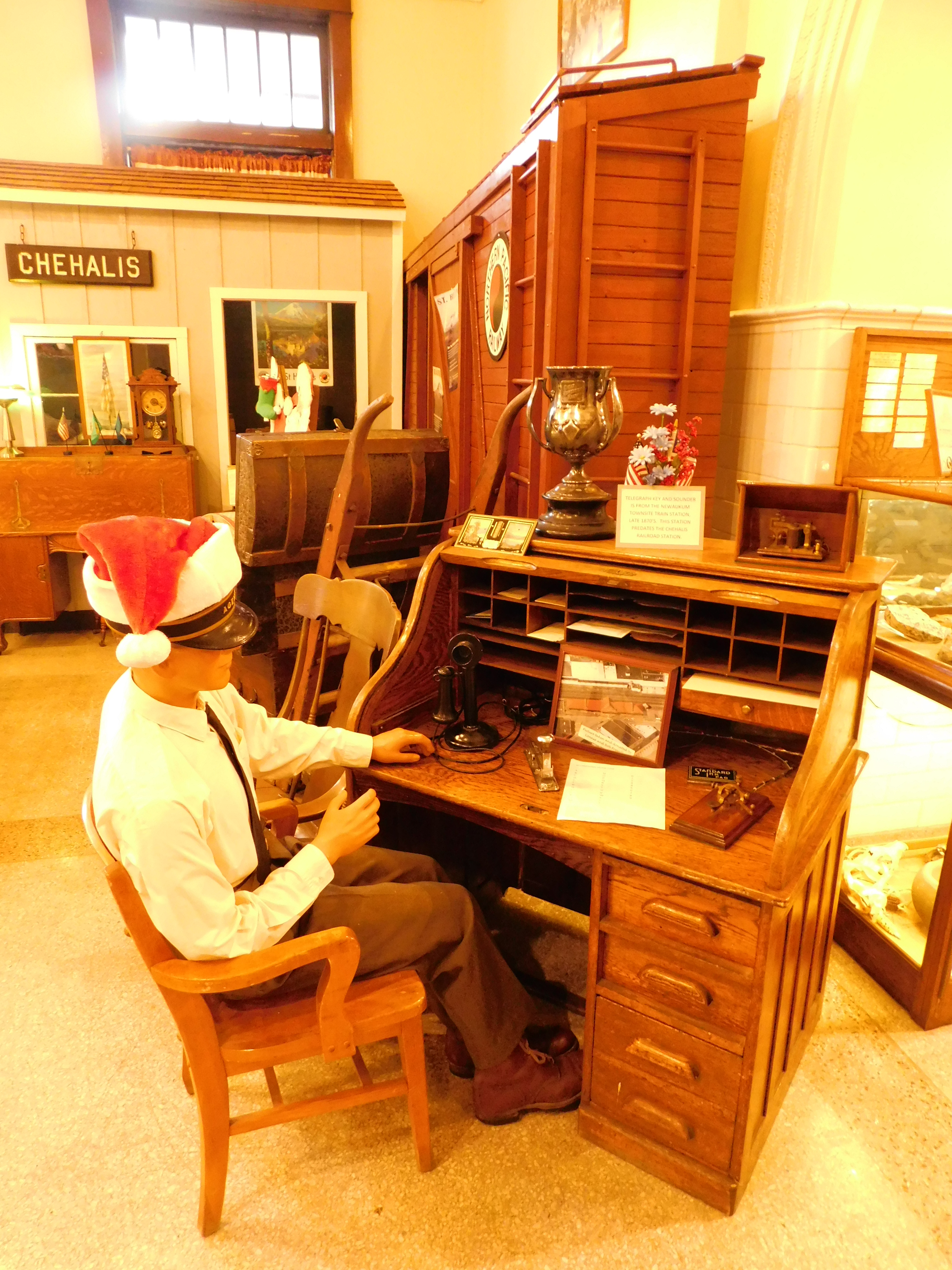
Interactive display, 2025

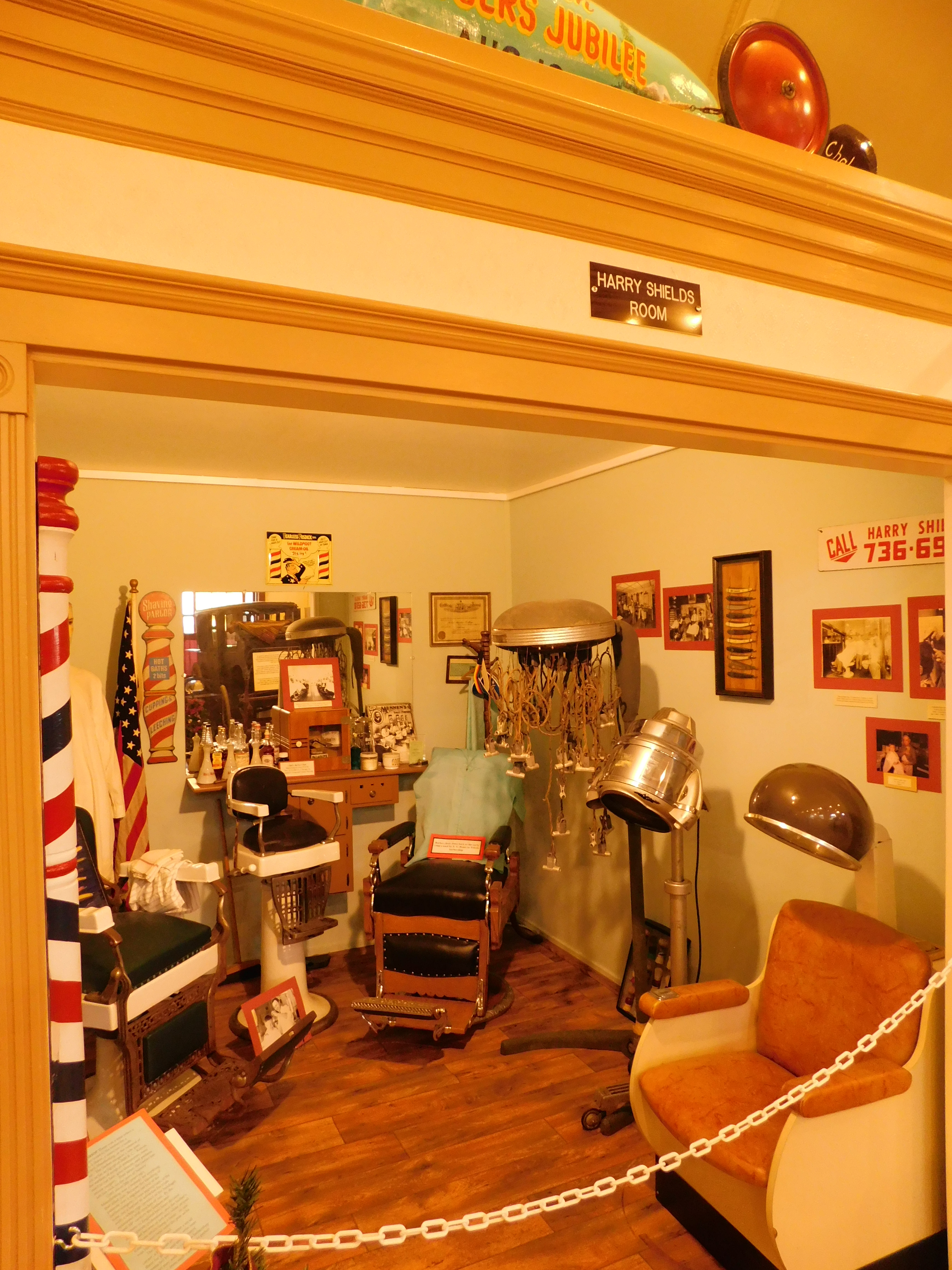
Harry Shields Room, 2025

=== McKinley Stump ===
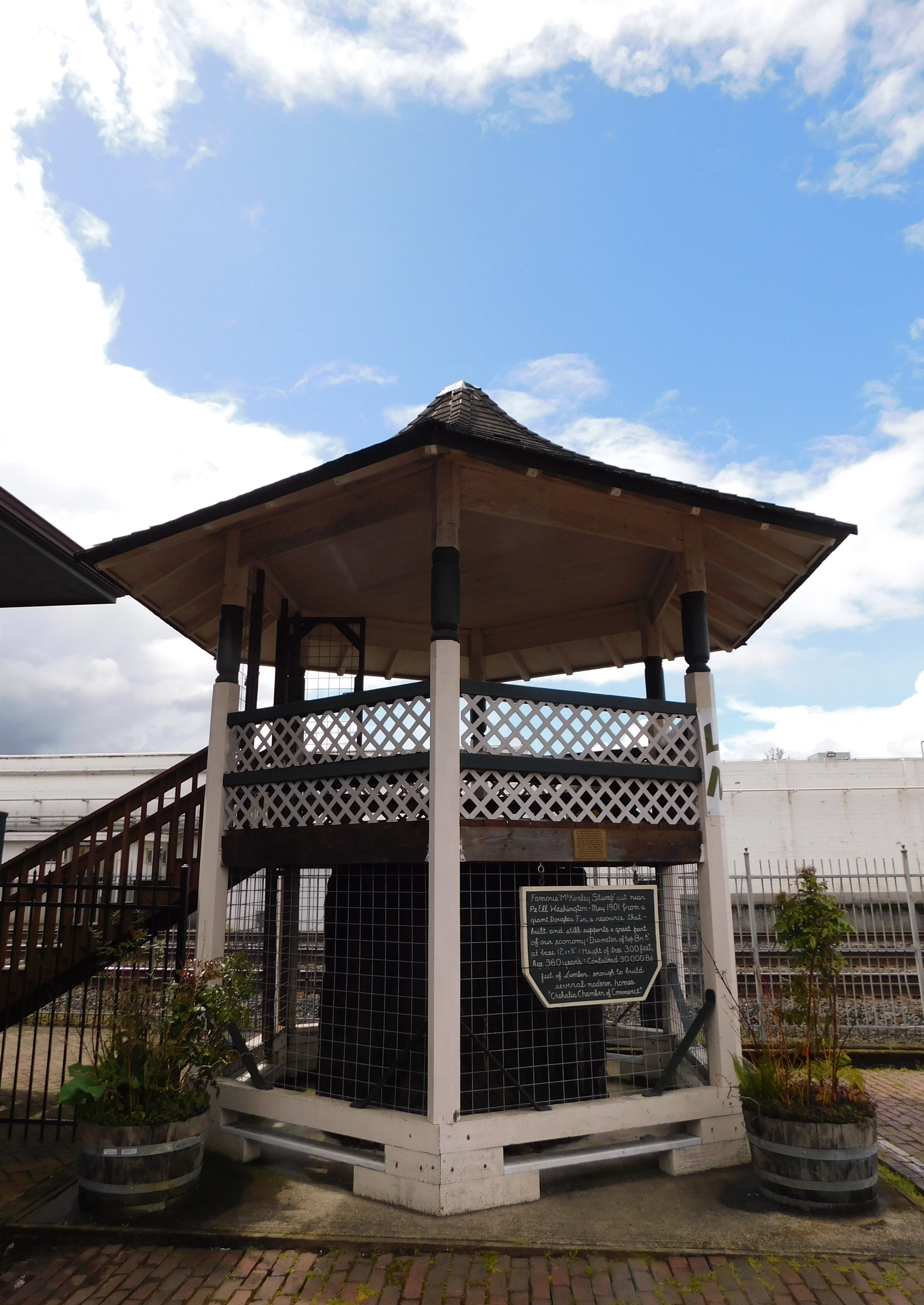
McKinlkey Stump at main entrance, 2024

Located at the Lewis County Historical Museum is the McKinley Stump, a replica of an 8 foot (2.4 metres) tall remnant of a Douglas fir cut down in 1901 near Pe Ell. It was meant to be used as a speech pedestal for President William McKinley. The pedestal was used by Theodore Roosevelt during his 1903 visit to Chehalis and William H. Taft employed the stump as a podium in 1907. The landmark was originally placed in downtown under a pagoda near the original station.

The McKinley Stump was moved to the new depot in 1914, featured on a grassy lawn area, immediately south of the freight entrance.

=== Notable volunteers ===
A group known as The Friday Bunch was formed and seated by the Detering sisters. The trio of Elma, Hazel, and Ruby came from a pioneer family in Lewis County and were long-serving volunteers at the museum, with Elma and Hazel serving since the museum was located at the Cory House in the 1960s.

The museum's research library was named Margaret Shields Library in 2014 after a long-serving volunteer. Shields, known as the museum's official historian, began the library after joining the staff in 1977. She made the first donation to restore the endowment fund after the 2008-2010 embezzlement. Gathering historical documentation in cooperation with Margaret Langus, she became known as one of "the Margarets", and also as "Maggie the Mechanic" due to her employment as a Rosie the Riveter at the local Boeing plant during World War II. Shields died in 2016 at the age of 96.

Langus, who worked as a nurse at the same Boeing plant, was an archival and research volunteer for 20 years. She died in 2015 at the age of 93.

== Future plans ==
A railfan park has been considered since 2022 that would neighbor the Lewis County Historical Society and Museum. The idea began after the livestream video camera was placed on the museum in 2019. The park's plans include benches and tables, a boardwalk, and a caboose open for interactive exploration. The depot, since its conversion to a historical repository, has long lacked an area for the viewing of trains despite a mile-long sightline for incoming trains. The project was reinvigorated in 2025 after the death of Daryl Lund, a well-respected and prominent Chehalis resident who, as a member of the city council, helped authorize the railfan camera. The updated plans, adhering to the Americans with Disabilities Act of 1990, would include a photograph interpretive display and a courtyard.

== Events and festivals ==
The museum was host to several events held during the 150th anniversary of Lewis County. The ceremonies included the December 1994 kickoff of the year-long celebration and an unveiling of the sesquicentennial logo.

In an effort to raise funds and promote the museum, the LCHS cooperated with the Chehalis–Centralia Railroad in September 2006 to stage a performative train robbery. Employees of the museum participated in the event.

Throughout May 2012, events were held at the museum in celebrating the 100th anniversary of the station. The first event focused on transportation, with a vintage car show that featured horse drawn carriages. A postmark with a pictorial cancellation was offered by the Chehalis Post Office, commemorating the depot's construction. The cancellation stamp featured an illustration of the building. Envelopes, with either a McKinley Stump photo or of a railroad-style logo, were also offered. The postmark celebration was held during a one-day only “100 Years of Technology” exhibit that featured vintage railroad and agricultural equipment, as well as older technology such as cameras, radios, and telephones. An official anniversary ceremony was celebrated on May 26, 2012, with a focus on technology. A working telegraph, on loan from a museum in Winlock, was on display and available for use, and the festivities included live music and the unveiling of information kiosks highlighting historical locations throughout the city.

The museum has been part of the Chehalis Flying Saucer Festival, an event that honors the city's connection of the 1947 Kenneth Arnold UFO sighting. Held since 2019, it features candy and gift-filled cardboard flying saucers known as the "saucer drop" that celebrates the 1947 flying disc craze; the drop was once part of Chehalis's "Krazy Days", an annual festival now known as ChehalisFest.

A Christmas tree lighting has been held at the museum since 2021. The event is held after the end of the city's annual Santa Parade.

== See also ==
- List of historical societies in Washington (state)
