= Arthur Cory =

American politician

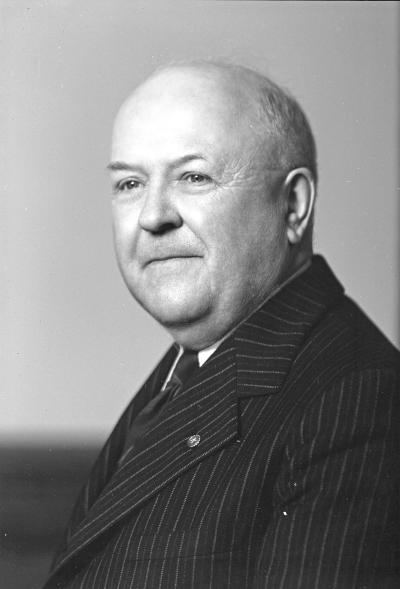
- Cory in 1947

Member of the Washington House of Representatives for the 27th district
- In office 1921–1923; 1929–1933

Member of the Washington House of Representatives for the 20th district
- In office 1943–1953

Personal details
- Born: July 6, 1880 Eagle, Wisconsin, United States
- Died: July 6, 1974 (aged 94) Oregon, United States
- Party: Republican

Arthur Stowell Cory (July 6, 1880 – July 6, 1974) was an American politician in the state of Washington. He served in the Washington House of Representatives. He represented the Republican Party.

Cory lived in Chehalis, Washington for over 60 years. He and his wife, Johanna, donated their home as use for a county museum to the Lewis County Historical Society and Museum in October 1966.
