= Vintage Motorcycle Museum =

- Established: 1979
- Location: Chehalis, Washington
- Coordinates: 46°39′56″N 122°58′15″W
- Type: Transport museum
- Collections: Vintage motorcycles
- Owners: Frank and Barbara Mason

The Vintage Motorcycle Museum, also as the Frank Mason Motorcycle Museum, is an appointment-only museum in Chehalis, Washington.

== History ==
The Vintage Motorcycle Museum, also known as the Frank Mason Motorcycle Museum, was founded in 1979 by retired building contractor Frank Mason. After retiring, Mason and his wife, Barbara, bought and renovated the historic 1889 Hotel Washington building in Chehalis, Washington after it burned in 1997. The collection was briefly moved to the Foster Bakery building, which was also affected by the blaze and restored by the Masons, in 1998; the Mason's renamed the structure as the Vintage Building. The Masons later moved the motorcycle collection to the hotel.

The museum moved its collection in 2021 to the Marketplace Square building, half a block south from the hotel.

=== Frank and Barbara Mason ===
Frank Mason was born in Los Angeles on March 11, 1941. He wed Barbara Back; the marriage lasted 62 years until Frank died in August 2024. The couple had two children.

The couple began restoring homes in Chehalis by 1962 and created their own construction company in 1971. Among their projects in the Chehalis Downtown Historic District was the renovation of the Marketplace Square Building and the bookstore, Book 'N' Brush. The Masons were a part of other restoration efforts in the city, which included such projects at the Judge Seymour White House, the Lewis County Courthouse, and the St. Helens Hotel; the hotel's conversion into apartments was the first effort under the Mason's renovation business. Mason was known as being charitable to the city, and was a public servant in various capacities, including serving on the board of the Chehalis–Centralia Airport and as a commissioner for the Port of Chehalis.

== Museum displays and features ==
The collection includes pre-1916 motorcycles, both single and three speed, along with photographs and memorabilia. By 2007, the museum displayed several makes and models under such manufacturers as Emblem, Pierce and Thomas. The oldest motorcycle was a 1900 Thomas and the collection also includes a 1915 Indian with a sidecar and a rare 1914 IMP Cyclecar. The museum contains non-motorized bicycles as well as motorcycles post-1916, including a 1940 Harley-Davidson Knucklehead police bike that once belonged to a sheriff from King County, Washington.

The collection at the museum can be viewed under an appointment-only process.

== See also ==
- Lewis County Historical Museum
- Veterans Memorial Museum
