= Chehalis Downtown Historic District =

Historic district in Chehalis, Washington

- U.S. National Register of Historic Places
- U.S. Historic district
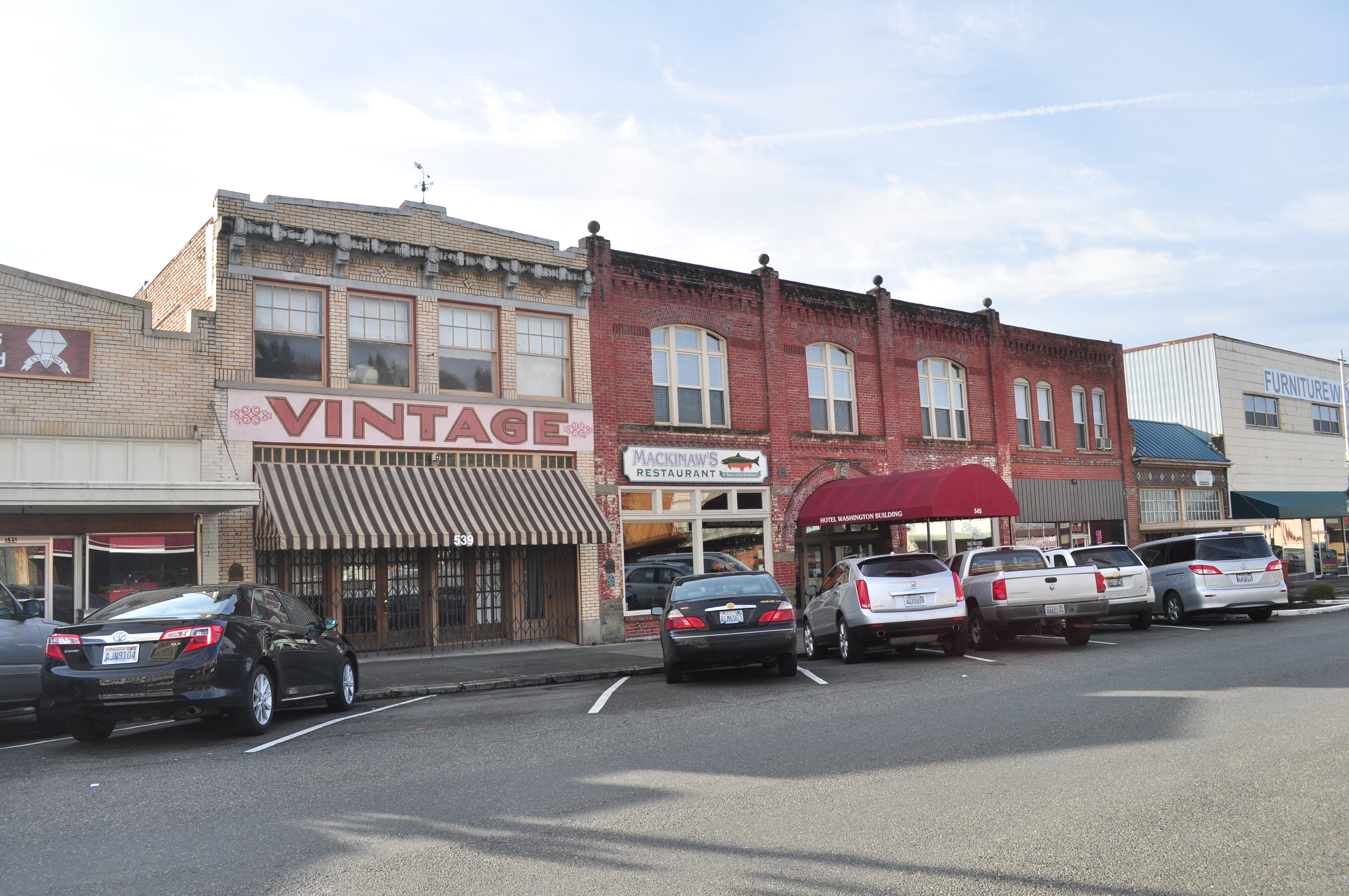
- Hotel Washington Building and nearby buildings, Chehalis, Washington.

- Location within Washington (state)
- Location: Roughly bounded by Park and Front streets, Washington and Cascade avenues, Chehalis, Washington
- Coordinates: 46°39′55″N 122°58′11″W
- Area: 10 acres (4.0 ha)
- Built: 1891
- Architectural style: Early Commercial, Colonial Revival, Classical Revival and Mission Revival
- MPS: Chehalis MPS
- NRHP reference No.: 97001407
- Added to NRHP: November 21, 1997

The Chehalis Downtown Historic District is located in Chehalis, Washington and has been listed on the National Register of Historic Places since 1997. It is one of three NRHP districts in the city, including the Hillside Historic District and Pennsylvania Avenue-West Side Historic District. The business center is the last of three separate downtown development periods in the city and construction of commercial buildings began in the late 1880s and early 1890s.

The downtown core underwent modern improvements after the turn of the 20th century, which included converting Market Boulevard and other streets into plank roads that were later paved with brick. Electric lighting was installed and the Twin City Railroad was constructed to pass through the district. The core was once home to the Chehalis Post Office and The Chehalis Bee-Nugget, and contained now-extinct features known as "The Big Clock" and the Flower Club fountain.

During the 20th century, the downtown core experienced several fires and suffered damages caused by the 1949 Olympia earthquake. Several efforts to revitalize the downtown area was undertaken in the 1970s which led to a reconfiguration of Market Street known as "Melhart's Maze". In the 21st century, the Historic Downtown Chehalis Walking Tour was initiated along with several projects to renovate and restore the downtown core, and included efforts for numerous murals and other public artworks.

The architectural style of the historic district includes buildings constructed in Classical Revival and Mission Revival and during the 1920s, several structures were designed by architect, Jacque “Jack” DeForest Griffin. Notable buildings include the Burlington Northern Depot, the lodging establishments Hotel Washington and St. Helens Hotel, as well as venues such as the Chehalis Theater and the St. Helens Theater. Several commercial structures are recognized for their historical importance by the Chehalis Historic Preservation Commission.

== History ==
=== 19th century ===
The current downtown is a third civic center of the city. It was originally at West Main Street close to the railroads tracks. Elizabeth (Eliza) Barrett Saunders had platted three blocks from her Donation Land Claim of three hundred twenty acres. Three blocks of development were the start of a town. Buildings were constructed around 1870 including the first Lewis County Courthouse.

The second downtown began down West Main Street at the comer of Chehalis Avenue and West Main Street. Barrett platted five parcels between 1881 and 1883. By 1891 this center included the city's first opera house (Tynan Opera House), and the Barrett Block housing a bank and hotel. In 1892 two fires destroyed the second city center. The majority of the buildings were wood; arson was suspected. The district was known for the Chehalis Fountain which was replicated at the Vernetta Smith Timberland Library.

The third center grew up on Market Boulevard. Buildings had been completed a couple of years before the fires. In 1889 the First National Bank. In 1891 the Chehalis Improvement Company constructed the first of two buildings, the Improvement Block. In 1892 the Columbus Block was completed in celebration of Christopher Columbus landing in the Americas four hundred years earlier. Soon after, construction of a fourth retail office structure, the Commercial Block, established an impressive modern building. Only the original bank building is gone, razed in 1949. Between 1890 and 1894, the Chehalis Land and Timber Company constructed the St. Helens Hotel. The district was also home to the East Side School, located in what was known as the "School Block" before moving out of the downtown area by 1912.

=== 20th century ===
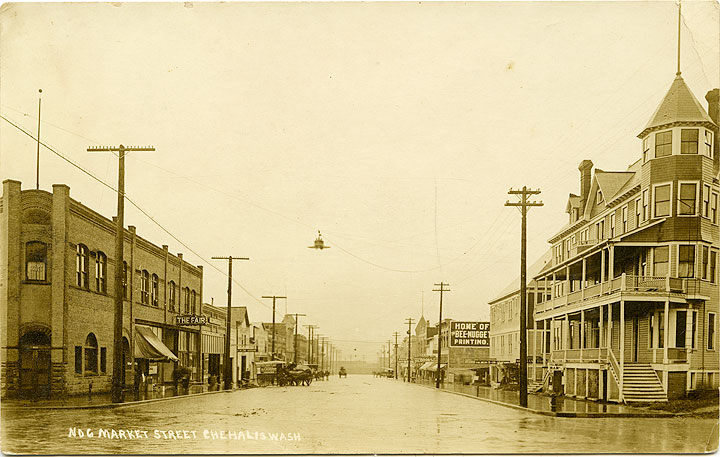
Downtown Chehalis, ca. 1910

By 1910, the downtown core's stability led to the build of a civic center and public library at the southeast end of downtown. The downtown was originally lighted by wire-suspended carbon arc lights. Market Boulevard was first covered with wooden plats in 1904 with an upgrade to brick in 1915 and eventually concrete by the 1930s. A track section of a street car route between Centralia and Chehalis was located on Pacific Avenue. The tracks were removed approximately in 1953.

A large fire occurred during the morning hours of August 2, 1912 beginning in the Bush Block at the Staeger Bros. book and stationary store. Over $14,000 in damages were reported, including at the Chehalis Bee-Nugget newspaper and the post office, both located in the block.

The growth of the downtown business core led to the first parking law within the district in 1927. Limiting all automobiles to two hours during the day, the law was made necessary by a lack of parking due to local citizens and business people anchoring their vehicles in spaces for the entirety of the day. These actions prevented customers and farmers from stopping, leading to a loss of business. Along with a rise in minor automobile and pedestrian accidents at the intersection of Market and Boistfort streets during the 1930s, the first stoplight in the district was placed at the junction in September 1936. The traffic signal was not publicly announced before its installation but was immediately well-received. Despite changes, accidents were still common, noted most by the death of long-serving Chehalis postmaster Lloyd Sullivan, who was struck by a truck while crossing Market in late-August 1953.

During the 1949 Olympia earthquake, damages occurred to several buildings in the downtown core, including the Security State Bank building which lost a 3.5 foot (1.1 metres) section of decorative railing. The quake, which lasted between 35 and 40 seconds during the late morning of April 13, 1949, also shattered windows and caused bricks to fall away from façades.

Market Street, beginning at the St. Helens Hotel, was converted into a northbound one-way thoroughfare in 1960. The district underwent major renovations in the mid-1970s with the build of curbed landscaped islands in the crosswalk areas. Although mostly appreciated by businesses in the downtown core, noticing that customers had easier access to both sides of Market Street, the improvements were derided by citizens soon after. Given the nickname, "Melhart's Maze", after Mayor Roy Melhart who helped to initiate the change, the islands were considered difficult to navigate for larger vehicles. Additional improvements in 1977 included the build of concrete parking strips and a new layer of asphalt.

The 1970s revitalization included a full conversion of the St. Helens Hotel into apartments, with the revival of the inn's retail spaces and the construction of a new coffee shop and restaurant on the ground floor. Remodeling took place at the Virgil R. Lee Insurance building, the George Sears Drug Store, and the St. Helens Theater. Businesses removed neon signs for less intrusive handmade advertising and economic conditions were noticeably improved.

On the afternoon of July 11, 1997, a large fire swept through parts of the historic district, partially destroying the Hotel Washington. Starting at a Red Cross office building, the flames spread to the hotel, which at the time was being used as a furniture store. The fire was contained by the evening after the combined use of 1,000,000 US gallons (3,800,000 L; 830,000 imp gal) of foam retardant and water. Within a year, both buildings were rebuilt and reopened under the ownership of Frank and Barbara Mason. The Mason's, under their construction company, had previously renovated the district's Judd Building and Marketplace Square.

=== 21st century ===
Beginning in the early 2000s under a program known as the Chehalis Historic Preservation Commission, the city began to honor older homes, including those in the downtown district, that are connected to the history and heritage of Chehalis. Houses accepted into the designation receive a brass plaque that includes the year the structure was built and the name of either the architect or original owner.

In 2009, the Chehalis Community Renaissance Team (CCRT) (Note: The Chehalis Community Renaissance Team changed its name to "Experience Chehalis" in 2022.) initiated the Historic Downtown Chehalis Walking Tour, publishing a free booklet to guide visitors to notable buildings in the downtown core. Two years later, the CCRT, in coordination with businesses in the districts, as well as donors, began installing cast iron plaques to denote structures on the tour. In the following weeks, forty buildings received the tour markers.

The city, in coordination with Experience Chehalis, launched a multi-year downtown revitalization program, known as the Imagine Downtown Chehalis project, in 2024. The plans include the restructuring of main streets in the city's historic core, including Market and Boistfort, with attention to traffic flow. Additional upgrades to enhance community participation, economic opportunities, and safety are included with betterments in street lighting and sidewalks. The project's master plan was adopted by the city council in April 2025.

The first phase of the efforts, also referred to as the Downtown Rejuvenation Project, is estimated to cost approximately $8.1 million. A proportional grant, with a maximum allotted amount of $4.0 million, was authorized by the state's Transportation Improvement Board (TIB). The TIB grant will cover almost half of the initial start of the project, focusing on infrastructure and transportation improvements in the downtown core. The remaining costs are to borne by the city under several capital funds, including taxpayer approved collections under a Transportation Benefit District separate from the city's general fund. Upgrades to underground electrical and water lines, along with construction to remodel the north and south entrances to the downtown area, were announced to begin in 2027.

== Geography ==
The Chehalis Downtown Historic District is located in northeast Chehalis, Washington. The downtown area consists of the main thoroughfare, Market Boulevard, (Note: Locally, Market Boulevard is often known or referred to as Market Street. See sources in the article for the interchange of monikers for the roadway.) connecting avenues Boistfort, Cascade, and Pacific, as well as Division Street and Front Way. Boundaries of the district are also described as between the Burlington Northern Depot and the St. Helens Hotel.

The downtown area is often noted to smell of mint due to the location of the mint factory of I.P. Callison & Sons, immediately north of the district.

== Description of properties ==
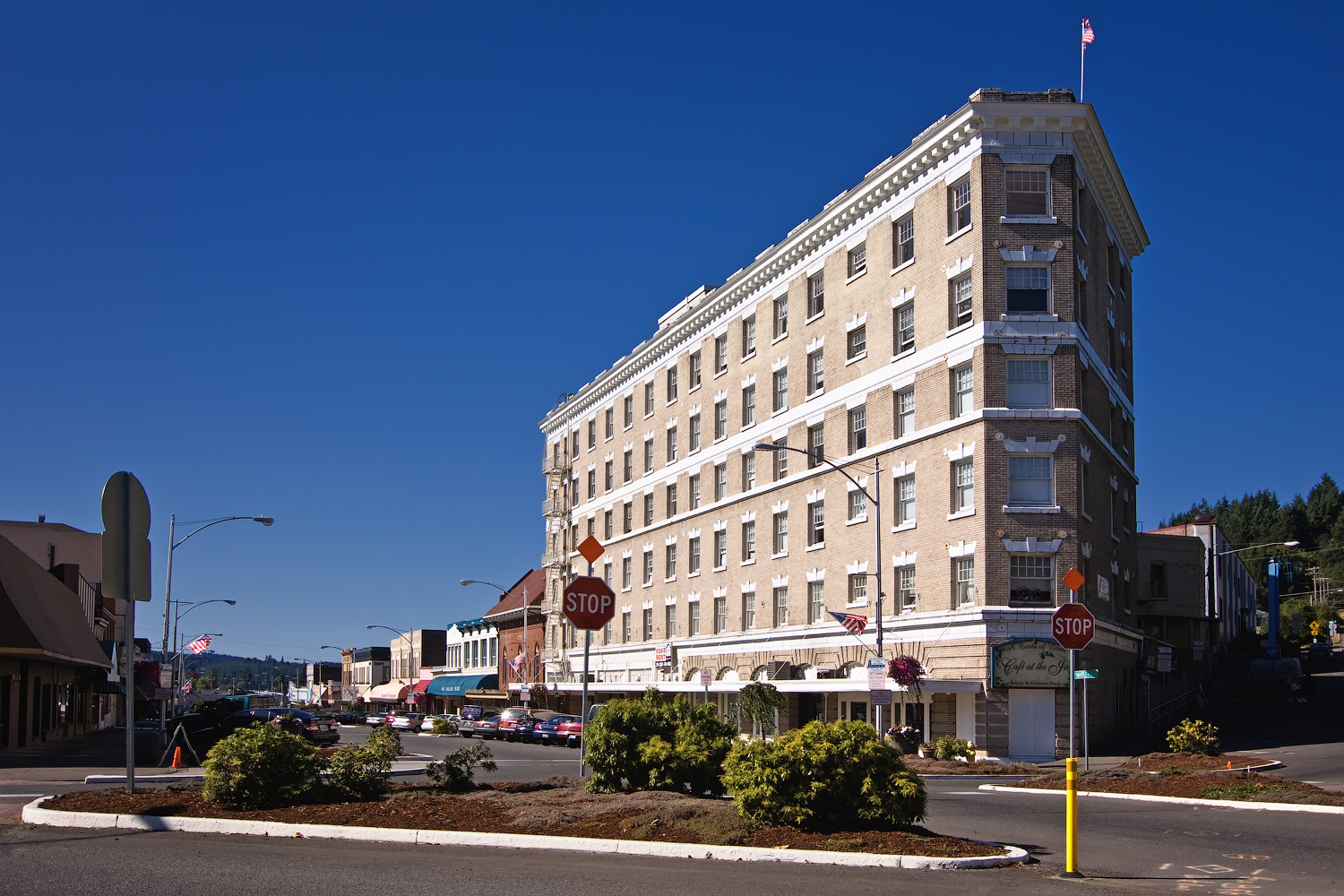
St. Helens Hotel Building and nearby buildings, 2011

No commercial structures from the first two downtown districts in the city survive.

The majority of the buildings are described as being in late 19th century commercial style, many with metal awnings or canopies of a non-historic character. (Note: The NRHP nomination form mentions that the "modernization" of the historic district has "taken its toll" in regards to awnings and windows.) Other architectural styles include Classical Revival and Mission Revival. In the 20th century, the architect Jacque “Jack” DeForest Griffin was responsible for the creation of several buildings constructed in the 1920s, including the Renaissance Revival-style Elks Building in 1920, the Italian Renaissance inspired St. Helens Theater in 1924, the home of the Lewis County Public Utility District on Prindle Street, the Advocate Building, and several other extinct structures in the downtown core.

The listing to the National Register of Historic Places contains a total of 26 buildings contributing to the historic district; the designation specifically mentions 11 non-contributing structures. The district was reported in 2013 to encompass approximately 38 acres (15 ha). The NRHP nomination noted the "unusual aspect" of multiple entrances for buildings located on parcels between Market Boulevard and Pacific Avenue.

=== Chehalis Avenue ===
- 75 Cascade Avenue, ca. 1920, San Juan Arms Apartments

The apartment complex was originally owned by Arthur St. John and contains an underground tunnel for a heating plant that was used in common with the St. Helens Theater, once the St. John's Garage. The building was built on a hillside in a triangular footprint and is styled in American Craftsman. The north side of the structure is two stories tall; the south section contains three floors.

=== Front Way ===
- 599 Front Way, 1912, Burlington Northern Depot

=== Market Boulevard (northeast side) ===
==== 460-466 N. Market Boulevard, 1910, Bush Building ====
Originally home of the Chehalis Bee-Nugget, the two-story building was constructed by its namesake, Daniel Bush. The site was home to the Chehalis Post Office and an art gallery of the Works Progress Administration.

The building contains a remodeled brick exterior bottom floor, a flat roof, and a plain cornice featuring five sets of double brackets. A row of dentils is located below a row of windows on the second floor. Original skylights were noted to remain at the time of the NRHP nomination.

==== 470 N. Market Boulevard, 1919 ====
Originally a wooden building, the site was rebuilt in 1919 and shares a continuous exterior with the Bush Building. The location also connects a portion of the second floor to its neighbor. A row of windows, with a continuous label molding, are located on the second floor that features stucco over brick.

At the time of the NRHP nomination, the year of construction of the building was noted to have been painted at the centered peak of the parapet.

==== 476 N. Market Boulevard, 1920 ====
A one-story structure that features common bond brick, a flat roof, and a decorated cornice with small brackets.

==== 486-492 N. Market Boulevard, 1891, Improvement Block ====
Constructed by the Chehalis Improvement Company between 1890 and 1891, the two-story brick structure is the oldest surviving commercial building in Chehalis. The block was built by a local contractor, D.W. Gray, for $14,000 (equivalent to $501,667 in 2025). The building originally contained a turret and a recessed entrance archway made of stone. The details, along with other exterior elements such as chimneys, dentils, and the parapet were removed after the structure suffered damages during the 1949 Olympia earthquake.

The block's alterations over the decades, including the loss of original details after the earthquake, were noted by the nomination to not be a hindrance to its listing on the district register. The historical importance, and remaining elements, continued to provide an integral connection to the record of the downtown district. (Note: The Improvement Block was noted by the nomination to just qualify for inclusion as alterations after the 1949 earthquake was two years shy of a 50-year eligibility limit.)

==== 506-514 N. Market Boulevard, 1892, Columbus Block ====
The utilitarian commercial building, located at the corner of Market and Boistfort Street, was once home to various businesses under the prominent Coffman family of Chehalis. The structure was noted by the NRHP listing to retain most of its original appearance; the original parapet, dentil elements, and windows were removed and the lower store front had been remodeled. An original detail, corbel bands that was situated beneath the original parapet, remained at the time of the district nomination.

Most commonly known as Market Square, the building was originally named in honor of the 400th anniversary of 1492 voyage of Christopher Columbus. During a remodel of the lower floor space prior to the NRHP designation, original small-pane glass windows were found.

==== 516-520 N. Market Boulevard, 1904, Hartman and Nathan Block ====
A two-story brick structure features a top-floor façade containing a cornice of corbels, masonry designs, and pilasters that separate the elements. The pilasters were originally located above the entrance. The name, H. & N. Block, and the year of construction, 1904, are painted on a centered plaque near the roofline. The building is known for a ghost sign for Levi Strauss & Co. overalls located on the northern exterior wall.

The Hartman and Nathan Store began in 1890, moving to the building after it was constructed. The business, an "old-fashioned general store" that became a clothing retailer, remained operational through the end of 1956.

==== 534 N. Market Boulevard, 1904 ====
The exterior of the one-story building is faced with common bond brick and the structure contains with a raised roofline, parapet, and a bracketed cornice.

==== 564-570 N. Market Boulevard, 1910 ====
Similar to the Beaux-Arts architecture of the neighboring Chehalis Theater, the one-story building features a flat roof, cornice, and frieze noted to be of complimentary style to the theater. The exterior is faced in grey granite and contains four Doric order-style pilasters with an accompanying set of carved, urn-shaped finials.

=== Market Boulevard (southwest side) ===
==== 429 N. Market Boulevard, 1892, Advocate Printing Building ====
The Vernacular architecture Advocate Printing Building, located at 429-435 N. Market Boulevard, was constructed in 1892 (Note: The NRHP nomination form mentions the Advocate Building to have been constructed in 1920.) and remodeled after a change in property ownership in 1975. The printing business has been in operation since 1895.

The two-story building's façade is constructed of brick and square tile and features a row of windows between multiple sets of brackets under a plain cornice. A flat roof is framed by piers. The main entrance is recessed and is flanked by copper window casements, original to the building. The rear exterior contains mullion, four-light sash windows on the second floor; windows on the first floor portion are either six or eight-light casements.

==== 437 N. Market Boulevard, 1925, JC Penney Building ====
Constructed approximately in 1925, the two-story building was once home to a JC Penney store. The exterior features common bond brick and a flat parapet. Decorative sections are located above windows on each floor, including between the parapet and plain cornice.

==== 453 N. Market Boulevard, 1930 ====
Split in half, the portion of the building listed as part of the historic district is located off NW Pacific Avenue. Noted by the NRHP to be in "good integrity", the one-story structure's exterior features plain brick and transom windows that are located between piers.

==== 455 N. Market Boulevard, 1920, Elks Building ====
Elks Building, rear, 2025

The Elks Building was constructed in 1920 at an estimated cost of $100,000. The 50 foot (15 metres) lot was purchased by the Chehalis lodge of the Benevolent and Protective Order of Elks and the structure was originally reported to be three stories tall.

Noted to be four stories at the time of the NRHP nomination, the Renaissance Revival style Elks Building features a brick façade and a stepped parapet at the roof line. A cornice dividing the third and fourth floors contains dentils and modillions. Windows on the top floor, noted to be six-over-six, feature keystones and plain cornices. Similar style casements are located on the third floor, which are detailed in a flat arch with a keystone. Five, four-light windows on the second floor feature arches that individually contain the initials of the Elk order, B.P.O.E., as well as a non-functioning clock display. The first floor was recorded t have been altered from its original appearance.

==== 465 N. Market Boulevard, 1927, Moore's Mens Store Building ====
Originally constructed for the owners of Moore's Mens Store, the business remained in operation until the early 1990s. At the time of the NRHP nomination, the exterior was noted to be stucco over the original common bond brick. A standing seam metal roofline is featured on both the front and rear of the building. A cornice, flanked by piers, contains multiple brackets. Transom windows and a recessed doorway with matching display windows are located on both the front and rear entrances.

==== 521-523 N. Market Boulevard, 1926 ====
Single-story, flat-roof building of common bond brick that was originally home to a shoe repair shop which adjoined The Buster Brown Shoe Co. store. (Note: At the time of the NRHP nomination, the Buster Brown building was noted to still contain two entrances at the front of the location.) A simple cornice and transom windows are notable features of the structure that at the time of the NRHP nomination contained the building's original skylight.

==== 525 N. Market Boulevard, 1900 ====
A flat roof, single-story building with a plain façade with stucco over common bond brick. The main feature is an original row of eleven transom windows, one of the few buildings in the district to retain such an element.

==== 531-535 N. Market Boulevard, 1918 ====
Single-story buildings of a similar style, with an exterior of common bond brick and a flat parapet roofline. Fechtner's Jewelry Shop, operational in Chehalis since 1903, was noted to be located at the 535 address at the time of the historic designation.

==== 539 N. Market Boulevard, 1900 ====
A two-story building with a façade of common bond brick that features a flat parapet roofline and a decorated cornice with five paired brackets. (Note: At the time of the NRHP nomination, the cornice and bracket feature of 539 N. Market was noted to contain two "circular designs".) The upper stories of both the front and rear contain a row of four windows. On the roof at the southwest end of the building is a wood, gabled dormer that lacks a window.

==== 551 N. Market Boulevard, 1894, Red Cross Building ====
Originally home to the Murphy & Johnson Saloon, the nineteenth-century commercial building is two stories and features a plain façade on the four-window second floor. Stucco was noted to cover the original brick but the roof line and windows remain in their original appearance. In March 1997, a remodeling of the structure, known as the Red Cross Building, had been completed.

The structure remained a contributing building despite damages from a fire on July 11, 1997. The building was noted to be a "hollow shell" after the blaze and was planned to be demolished. The Red Cross Building, constructed in 1894, was rebuilt by its owner, John Panesko.

==== 553-555 N. Market Boulevard, 1900 ====
A single story, split 19th century commercial building that was possibly altered approximately in the 1910s. The building's exterior contains raked brick and inset tiles. The tilework, part of a horizontal decorative row below the pier-framed plain cornice, consists of nine diamonds. The flat roof line at the front of the building features a standing seam metal roof. Two window sections, each containing thirty panes set in three horizontal and ten vertical rows, are located beneath the decorative row. The "plain façade" rear entrance on Northwest Pacific Avenue contains a recessed entrance flanked by windows.

The location was home to a restaurant known as the Little Gem Lunch in 1915.

=== Non-contributing buildings ===
Buildings in the historic district excluded from the NRHP listing include six addresses on the southwest side of Market Boulevard. Structures located on the city's Commercial Block were noted to have undergone significant changes by 1980, with decorative elements and original brick work removed from the exterior. A modern bank building at 473 N. Market, as well as a drive-up teller window at another bank, were mentioned as not being part of the historic designation. One section of a structure, split for use for two businesses, was recorded to be non-contributing by the NRHP due to a remodel in 1989.

On the northwest side are five non-contributing buildings, including the 1923 structure at 478 N. Market, was listed as lacking any appearance of an original façade.

=== Extinct properties ===
The earliest constructed business structure in the district was the First National Bank Building. Built in 1889 and located at the corner of Market and Boistfort Street, the building was demolished in 1949.

Located between 518 and 534 N. Market was the Rush Building that was constructed in 1909. The two-story structure featured Italianate architecture was 50 ft × 112 ft (15 m × 34 m) in size. The site became a parking lot and at the time of the NRHP nomination, an iron pier of the building was noted to be the only surviving remnant of the structure.

== Other significant properties ==
Two sites within the downtown historic district are individually listed on the NRHP. The Lewis County Historical Society and Museum, known also as the Burlington Northern Depot, is located in the west portion of the district and has been listed on the NRHP since 1974. The second site is the St. Helens Hotel, marking the southern edge of the historic area on Market Street, was originally a wood structure that opened in 1894. The hotel was added to the NRHP after major restoration efforts in the mid-1970s.

The Vintage Motorcycle Museum, once located at the Hotel Washington, is situated at the Marketplace Square building in the center of downtown. At the north end of Market Street is the Chehalis Theater which was built in 1938 as the Pix Theater. Next to the theater is a long running arts-and-crafts and book business known the Book 'n' Brush which occupies a space originally used for a retailer known once as "The Big Department Store".

=== Chehalis Historic Preservation Commission ===
The district hosts several buildings recognized by the Chehalis Historic Preservation Commission (CHPC), some of which are not listed within the historic designation by the National Register of Historic Places. The commission recognizes historical value and the subsequent preservation of homes and buildings in the city. A building honored with the designation receives a brass plaque that denotes the year of construction and the name of either the architect or original owner.

The Star Tavern building, a row house built in 1901 on Chehalis Avenue, received the CHPC honor in 1993 with the Advocate Printing building recognized the following year. In 2003, the CHPC awarded the Chehalis Theater with a listing and plaque recognizing the historical importance, and restoration efforts, of the movie house.

Located on the 249-289 block of Chehalis Avenue is the Garbe Building, constructed in 1908. Owned by the largest hops dealer in the Chehalis Valley, John Garbe, it was used as his office and as well as a lodging site known as the Garbe Hotel until 1923.

Frank Everett & Co. building, 2025

Saindon-Garbe Building, Chehalis Downtown Walking Tour plaque, 2025

== Extinct district features ==
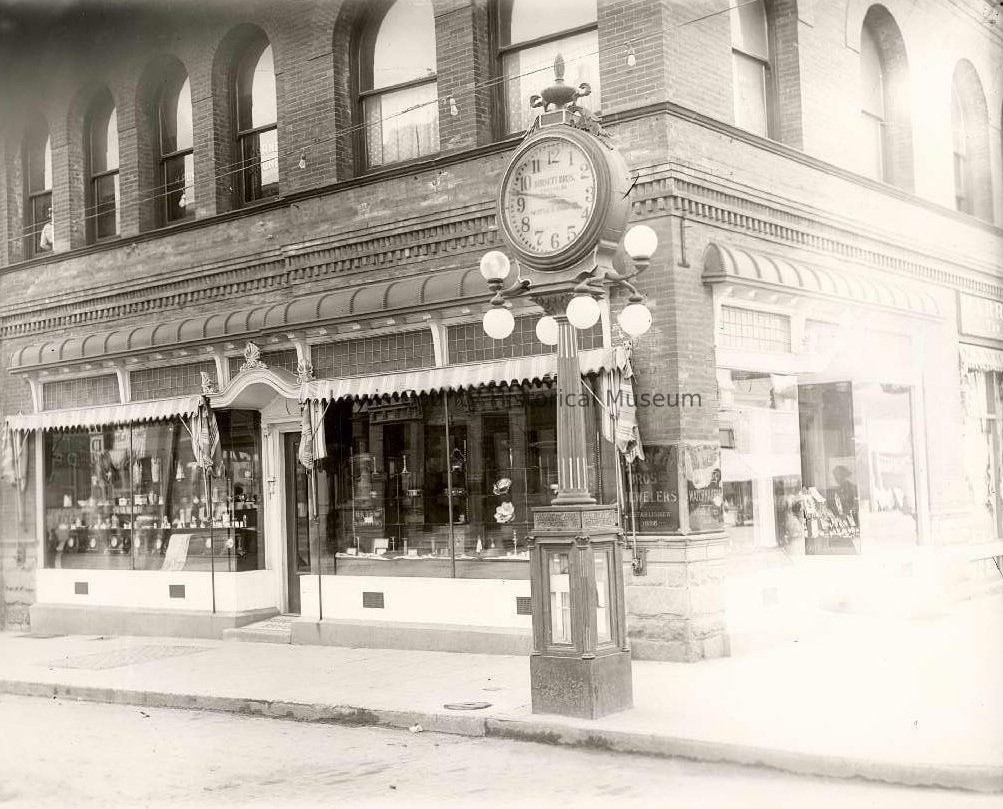
Burnett Jewelry Store, "Big Clock"

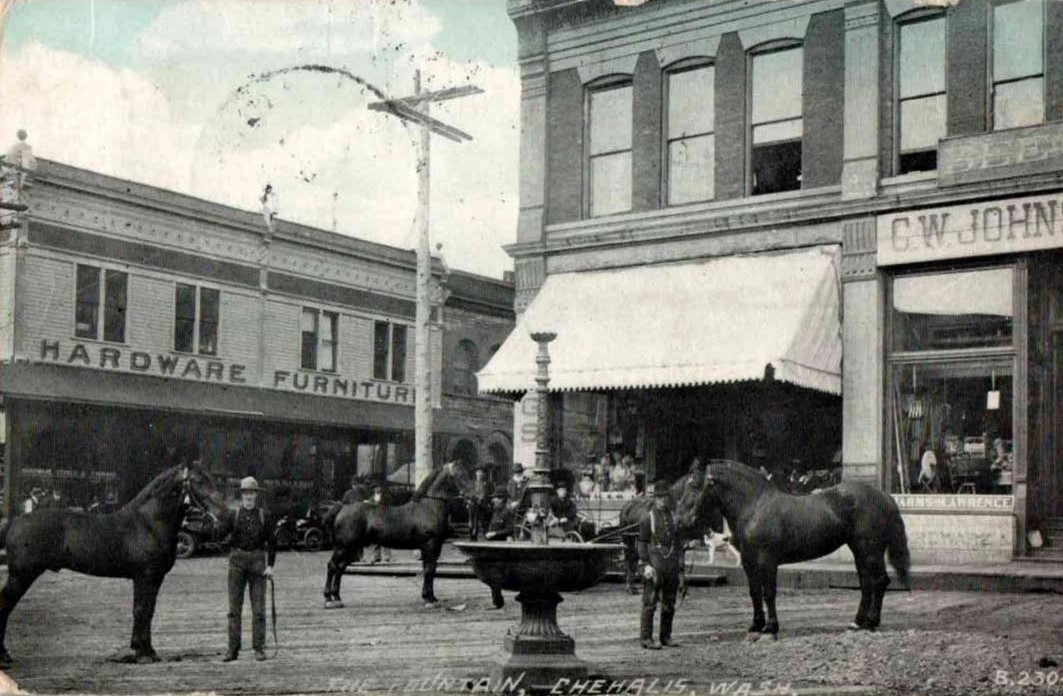
Flower Club fountain, ca. 1907-1916

=== The Big Clock ===
A street clock, known as "the Big Clock", was situated outside of the Burnett Jewelry Store in downtown. Thought to have been installed in 1901 or 1902, the E. Howard & Co. timepiece was a fixture in the city until January 1970 when it was removed after the jewelry business transferred to a new location in the downtown area. The clock, sold to an antique dealer, was moved to Newport, Oregon.

=== Flower Club fountain ===
A fountain, meant as a watering trough for horses, was erected at the intersections of Boistfort Street and Chehalis and Pacific avenues on February 12, 1907. The fountain contained a large basin on a decorative pedestal topped with an electric globe light, a modern amenity of the time. The public spring was the idea of a ten-member all-girl group known as the Flower Club. The organization paid $200 for the fountain, raising a smaller amount from city residents for freight and installation. Confusion over the responsibility of the placement of the fountain waylaid its initial installation for several months and the local Chehalis Bee-Nugget newspaper wrote editorials praising the young women while castigating older, more affluent residents for their lack of efforts and monetary donations.

In 1916, a horse carriage ran into the fountain and the damages to the water pipes severe enough that the fountain was often difficult to operate and maintain; it was permanently removed in early-May of that year. Additional reports note that the fountain was moved as it was becoming a hazard in the right of way due to an increase in automobile and Twin City Railroad street car usage. The fountain, possibly without the globe light and pedestal, was moved to the Chehalis Civic Center for a time. It was often used as a hazing ritual where freshmen students were dunked in the basin. The basin was transferred to the Chehalis Municipal Rose Garden where it was used as a planter. The remaining piece of the Flower Club's fountain has been considered lost since after the 1949 Olympia earthquake, with speculation that the basin rusted away, was simply removed as garbage, or destroyed in the cleanup after the earthquake.

== Artworks ==
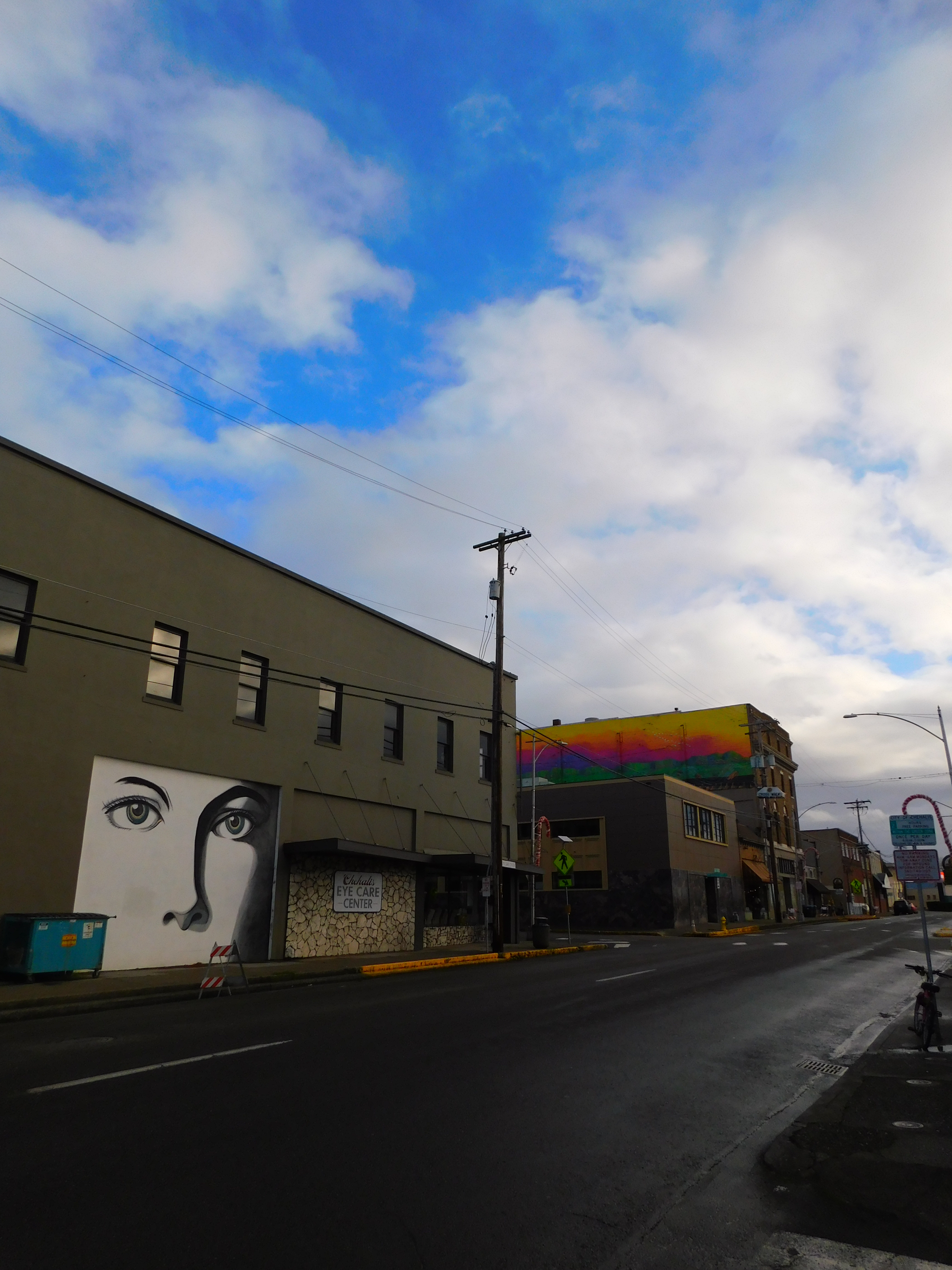
Pacific Avenue, 2025

The district is home to several murals, many sponsored by the city and community organizations, some of which partner with the Washington State Main Street Program. The largest in the downtown district is a painting of a steam train, titled #15 at Sunset, on the Elks Building. In an alley on the north side of Market Street are a variety of wall paintings focusing on the eclectic, such as aliens and Bigfoot.

Murals located in the main stretch of Market Boulevard and adjoining streets include a large welcome mural that focuses on the founder of the city, Elizabeth Barrett Tynan Saunders. The art piece, located at the north end of downtown, also depicts a history of airplanes and contains a small nod to the city's connection to the Kenneth Arnold sightings in 1947. Three murals decorate the adjoining public bathroom facilities, each containing specifics about the city's railroads and community togetherness, including another UFO themed artwork, the Kenneth Arnold. A mural of a butterfly flying over flowers, known as Garden Delight, is situated at the main crossing of Market and Boistfort and was completed in 2020. The mural, Lifting Up Chehalis, meant to inspire visitors to photograph themselves for social media, is installed on Boistfort Avenue, the location of the city's farmers market.

Murals located off Market Street include the work, Discover Lewis County, which was unveiled in October 2025. The artwork, created by "regional artist" Paul Lanquist, is situated on the historic Star Tavern on Chehalis Avenue.

Additional artworks include paintings done by local artists on utility boxes, trash can lids, and benches. The effort was based on a Chehalis Community Renaissance Team plan approved by the city council in 2009 that also included long term revitalization projects for downtown Chehalis such as building façade renovations.

== Significance ==
The Chehalis Downtown Historic District was added to the National Register of Historic Places (NRHP) on November 21, 1997.

The NRHP noted that the Chehalis Downtown District was similar to other small cities in Washington state, mentioning numerous alterations and modernization of several buildings. Despite the changes, the NRHP recorded that, overall, the downtown core retained an intact integrity of its architecture, listing the original forms and outlines of buildings in the district, as well as specific mentions of elements and details such as belt courses and windows, ghost signs, and painted plaques denoting construction dates and original owners.

== See also ==
- History of theaters in Chehalis, Washington
- National Register of Historic Places listings in Lewis County, Washington
