= St. Helens Theater =

Historic theater in Chehalis, Washington

- The House of Hits
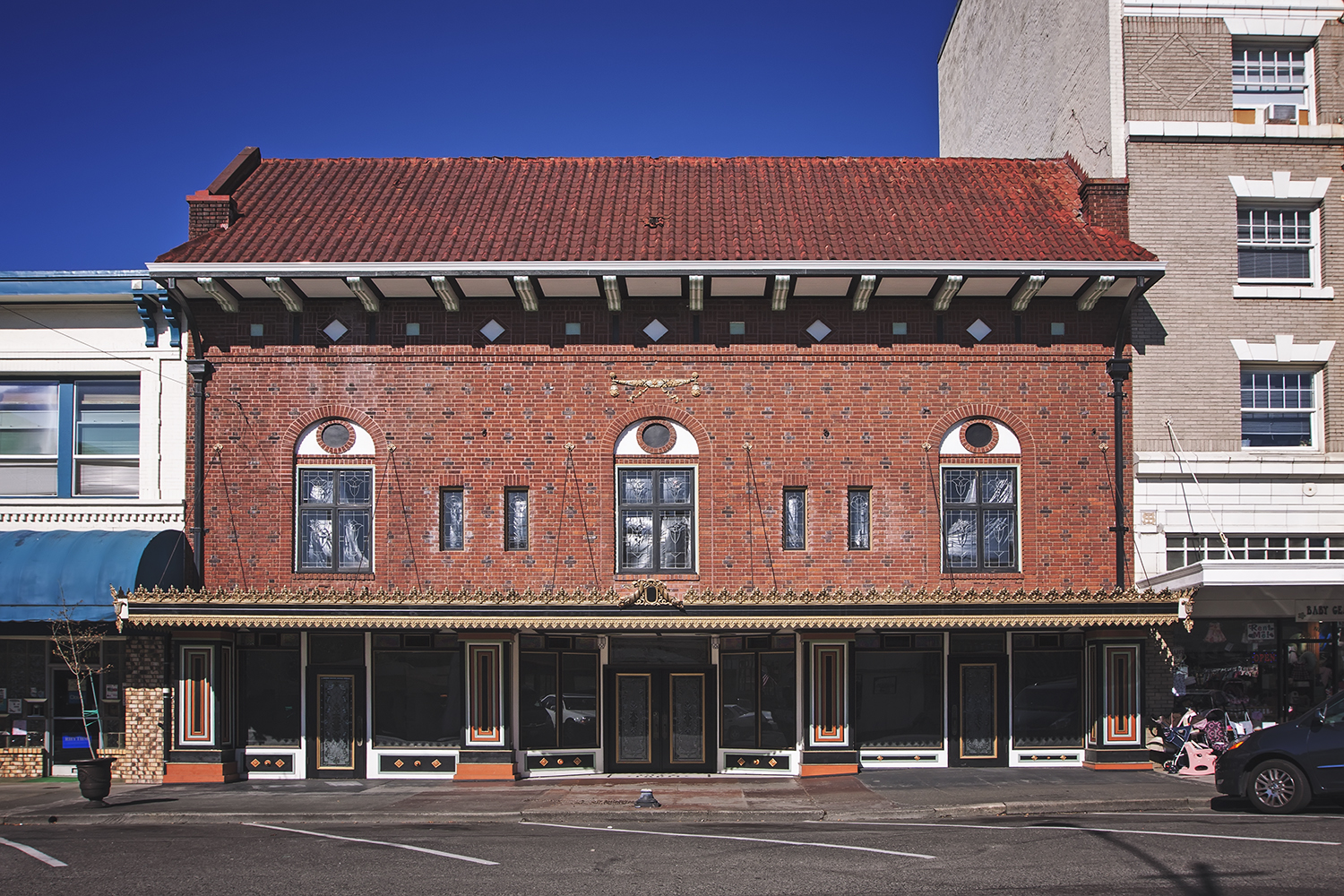
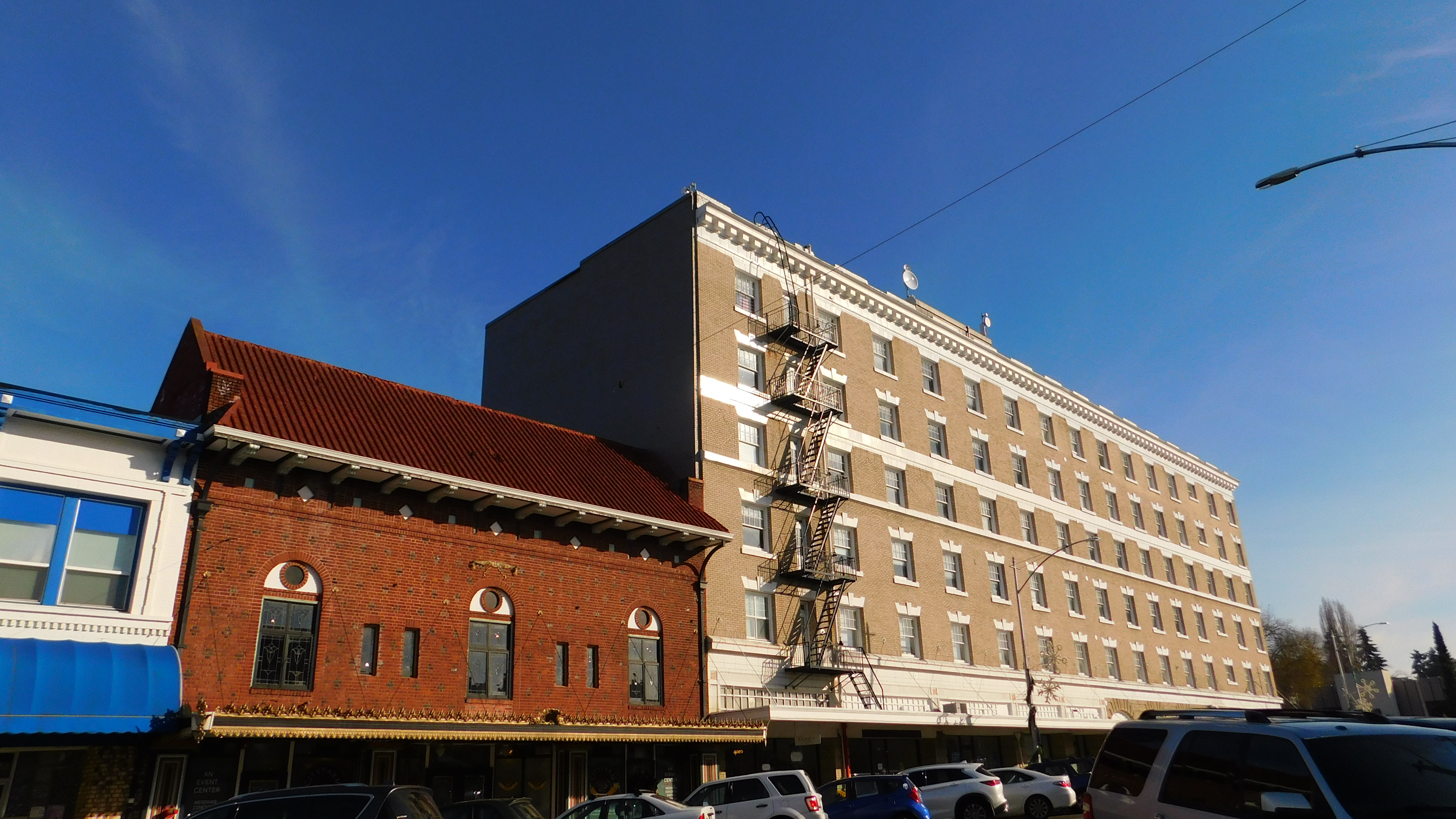
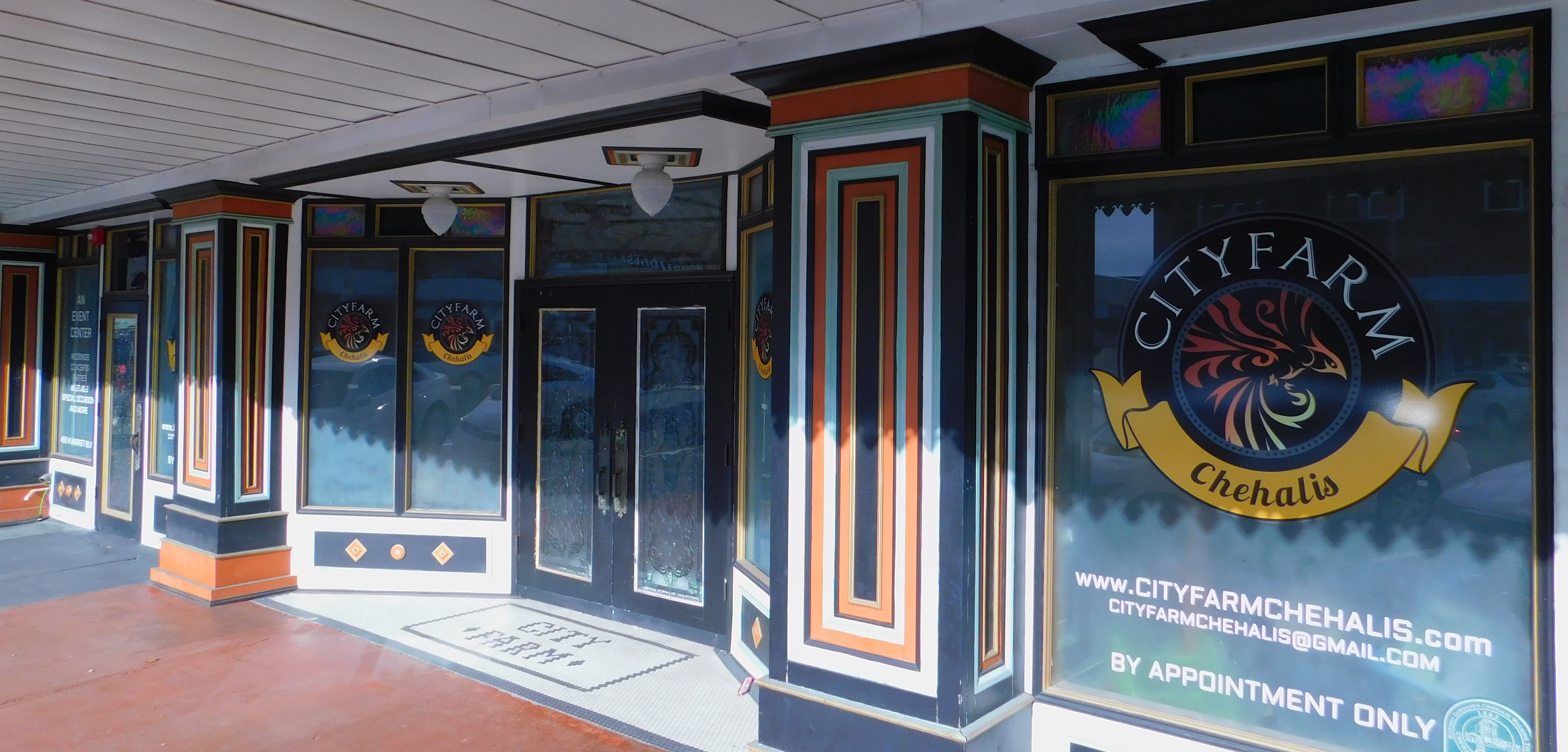
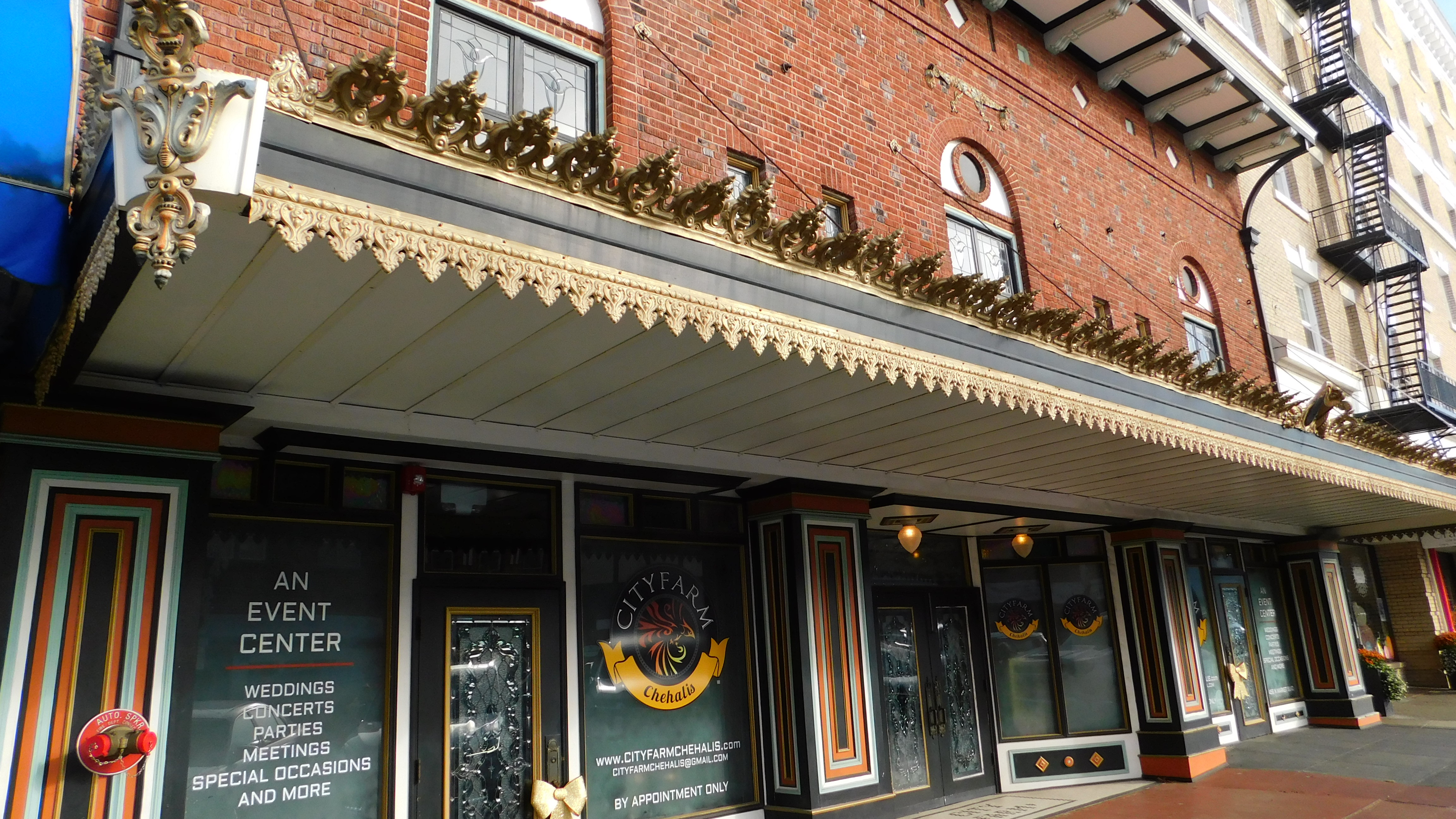
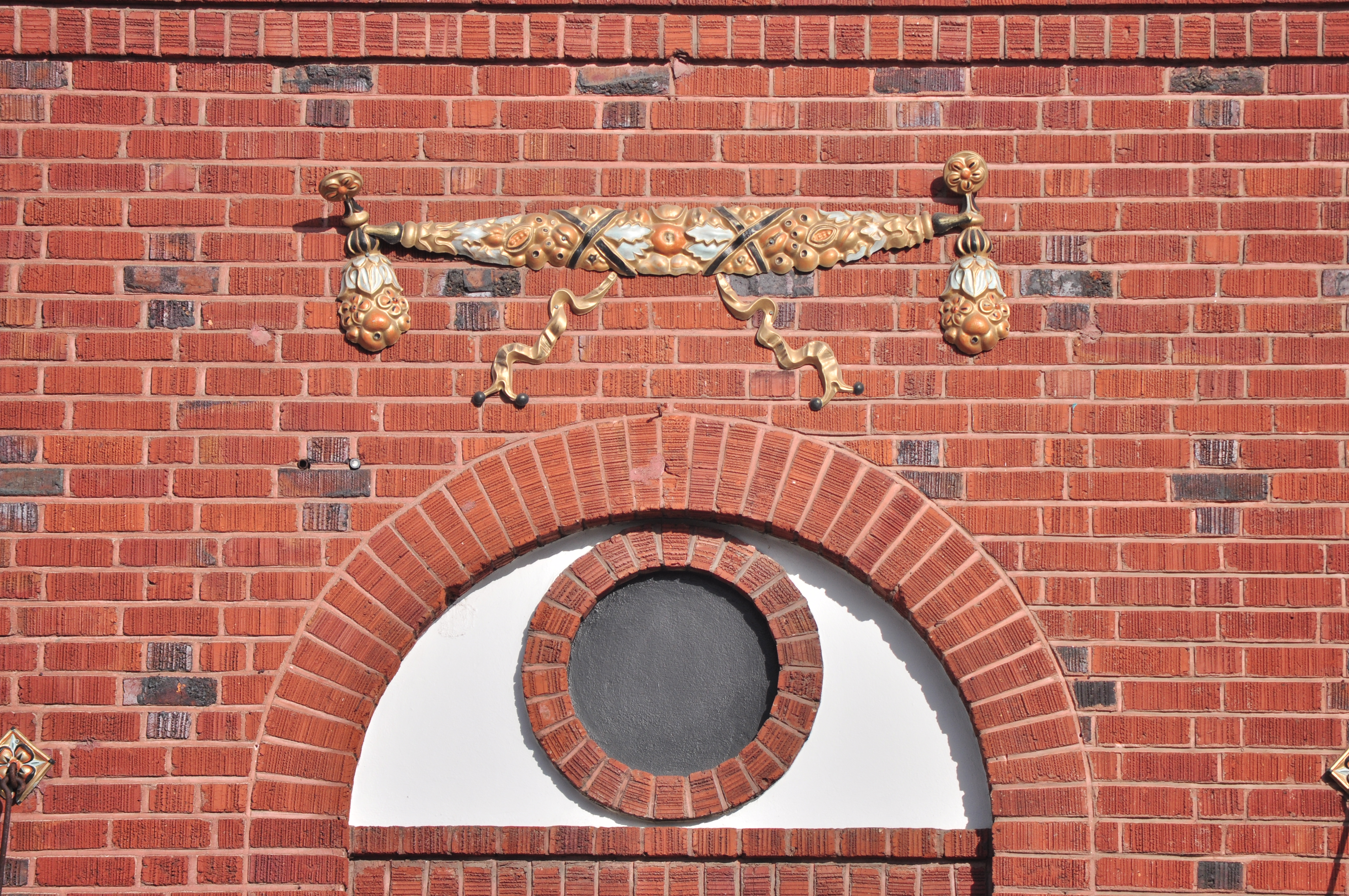
- Former St. Helens Theater Theater next to St. Helens Hotel Front entrance, 2022 Exterior details, 2023 Exterior detail
- Interactive map of St. Helens Theater
- Former names: St. John's Garage
- Address: 456 N Market Blvd (Note: Before a city-wide renumbering of addresses in the city in 1975, the original address was 886 Market.)
- Coordinates: 46°39′53.9964″N 122°58′7.914″W
- Owner: Arthur St. John, Twin City Theater Company, United Theatres Company
- Capacity: 850
- Screen: 1
- Production: Film, live theater performances

Construction
- Opened: May 12, 1924
- Renovated: 2008
- Closed: March 12, 1954
- Architect: Jacque DeForest Griffin

Website
- City Farm Chehalis

The St. Helens Theater is a former single-screen movie house in Chehalis, Washington. The theater is situated within the Chehalis Downtown Historic District and is located next to the St. Helens Hotel; both the district and hotel are listed on the National Register of Historic Places.

The building was originally an automobile dealership owned by a prominent Chehalis businessman. Remodeled beginning in 1923 in Italian Renaissance style, the St. Helens Theater was designed by architect Jacque DeForest Griffin. The playhouse opened on May 12, 1924 featuring the movie, Sporting Youth. Used as well for vaudeville, the theater contained a stage, large lobby, and was known for elaborate design flourishes. The "House of Hits" featured a $20,000 Kimball International organ.

Managed by a regional theater company since the movie house began, the theater remained operational until March 12, 1954, when it was closed. With the advent of larger movie screens and competition from a newer, more modern Pix Theater in the downtown district, a remodel of the St. Helens was found impractical due to expense and the footprint limitations of the structure. The building was converted into an office building, remaining so into the 21st century.

In 2008, the building was renovated to be used as a private event and rental venue. The restoration led to the finds of numerous theater details that were preserved.

== History ==
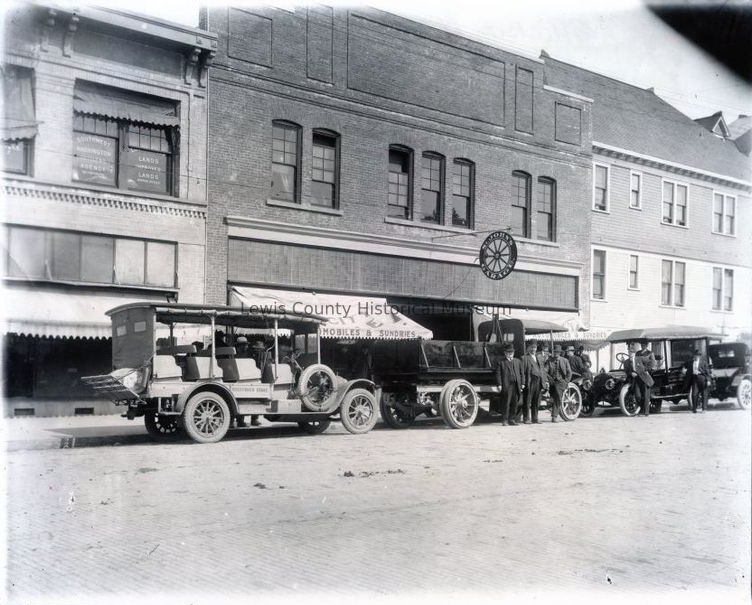
St. Helens Theater, as the St. John's Garage, ca. 1914–1915

The St. Helens Theater, (Note: The words, "theater" or "theatre", are used equally when describing the St. Helens in sources, even from its beginnings. No source has yet been found to convey which spelling is considered official. See sources throughout the article.) designed by architect Jacque “Jack” DeForest Griffin, (Note: Jack Griffin is often incorrectly mentioned as the architect of the St. Helens Hotel, the confusion arising from the theater being located immediately next to the inn.) was located next to the historic St. Helens Hotel in the downtown district. The building occupied by the St. Helens Theater was originally utilized as a Ford dealership; a gas station was located at the site. Known as the St. John's Garage, the dealership and theater were owned by Arthur St. John, who also had ownership stakes for several years in The Dream and Liberty theaters.

Plans to convert the garage to a movie house, initially estimated to cost $75,000, were begun in July 1923 with proposals including an 18 ft × 50 ft (5.5 m × 15.2 m) stage and a large lobby.

The brick-and-tile Italian Renaissance style theater, with a final renovation cost of $100,000, opened on May 12, 1924. The venue had an occupancy of 850 and was home to a $20,000 Kimball organ. (Note: Initial reporting listed the organ's cost at $15,000 and the instrument shipped in two pieces due to its size.) Billed as the "House of Hits", the theater's first presented film was Sporting Youth.

While the movie house exhibited films, the venue was used as well for live theatrical performances, particularly vaudeville. The playhouse was under the ownership of the Twin City Theater Company. (Note: The Twin City Theatres Corporation was formed by local movie venue owners A. F. Cormier, Frank A. Graham, and E. T. Robinson shortly before the loss of Centralia's Grand Theatre to fire in April 1924. The company's formation allowed for a monopoly of the remaining movie houses in the two cities.) Along with the Dream Theater in 1927, the St. Helens was sold to the United Theatres Company as part of a $1.0 million purchase of theaters in the region.

The St. Helens installed a Movietone sound system in 1929, becoming the first theater in the city to host a talkie. The first talking picture shown was the George Jessel comedy-drama, Lucky Boy. The advancement was of such value that a two-page spread advertisement was published in the Chehalis Bee-Nugget newspaper, with local businesses congratulating the theater.

=== Closure ===
In 1952, the organ was sold for $1,000 to a resident of Seattle where he installed it in his parents' home.

In a February 1954 announcement, the St. Helens Theatre was to close on March 12, 1954 after the building was sold by the Twin City Theatre Company to F and S Improvement Company of Centralia. The sale was part of a business interest swap for the theater company, acquiring the Centralia Liberty Theatre building in return from another entity. The St. Helens venue was to be converted into a commercial building with a 15-year agreement that the remodeled structure could not be used for theater purposes. (Note: The sale of the St. Helens was for the building only, not the St. Helens Theatre name or company, which necessitated the 15-year non-compete agreement.)

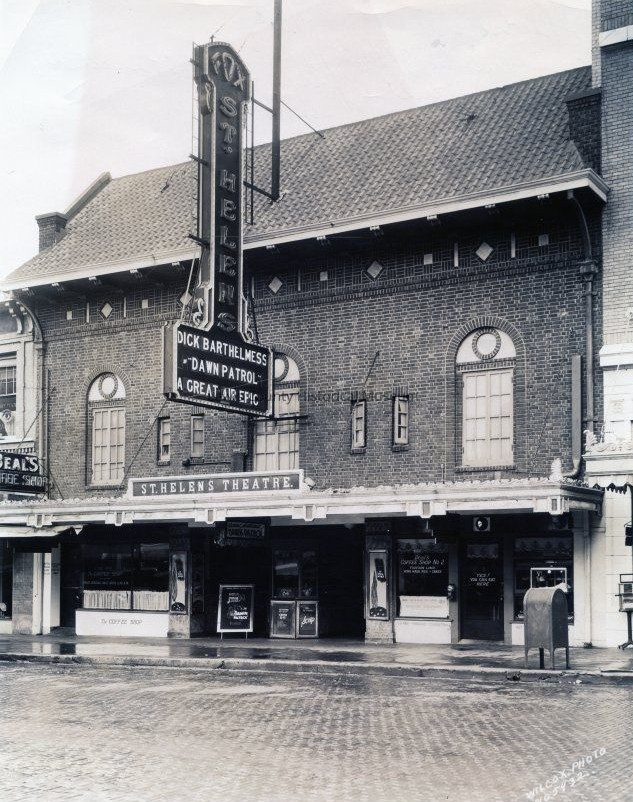
Marquee, 1930

The sale of the St. Helens was made necessary due to the lack of space for a wider movie screen at the theater, a feature becoming more common at the time. With alterations of the St. Helens proven to be limited and expensive, moviegoers opted for the competing Pix Theater at the north end of the downtown district, which was considered newer and more modern, offering better sightlines and comfort. Transfer of some film projection equipment from the St. Helens to the Pix began shortly after the sale announcement.

In its final week, the movie house showcased the films Mogambo, featuring Clark Gable and Ava Gardner, and the Oscar-winning documentary, The Sea Around Us. The final films shown at the St. Helen's Theater was the last Disney-released RKO Radio Pictures film, Rob Roy: The Highland Rogue, and the war film, El Alamein.

By July 1954, the conversion of the theater was underway, with a Chehalis Chamber of Commerce committee requesting that exterior improvements to the appearance of the old venue be "worked out". The balcony was sealed off and converted to office space. During a dismantling of the interior in September, a piano and a birch door were stolen from the premises. County sheriffs found the items in November sitting in the front room of a house, the Chehalis resident claiming that the items were being stored and was unaware of their provenance. A man was arrested for the theft weeks later in Roseburg, Oregon.

After the remodeling of the St. Helens Theatre, the first business to occupy the revamped space was Pacific Telephone and Telegraphy Company of Chehalis (PT&T), opening a new office in the building in July 1955. The Chehalis Flower Shop opened next to the PT&T office the following month.

The theater was used for a time in the 1970s as offices for the local Chamber of Commerce. The site was remodeled beginning in 2008 and converted into a rental venue that restored large parts of the original theater footprint and fixtures. A ghost sign for the Chehalis Bee-Nugget newspaper was found during the remodel and was preserved.

== Geography ==
The St. Helens Theater is located within the Chehalis Downtown Historic District and immediately next to the St. Helens Hotel. Both the district and hotel are listed on the National Register of Historic Places.

== Architecture and features ==
The St. Helens Theater had a footprint of 50 ft × 110 ft (15 m × 34 m) and contained office space off the lobby. The building was furnished, at a cost of $19,000, with Hartford-Saxony designed carpeting, featured a garden next to the stage, an orchestra pit, and was adorned with decorative panels on the walls and grillwork on the ceiling. The machinery was considered top-of-the-line for its day and the seating was air-cushioned, including some that were upholstered in leather. The stage was listed as 22 ft × 24 ft (6.7 m × 7.3 m) and the dark blue, gold-accented curtain was raised and lowered via electricity. Dressing rooms were located across the alley from the theater, as was the $10,000 worth of equipment to provide heat and cooling to the auditorium.

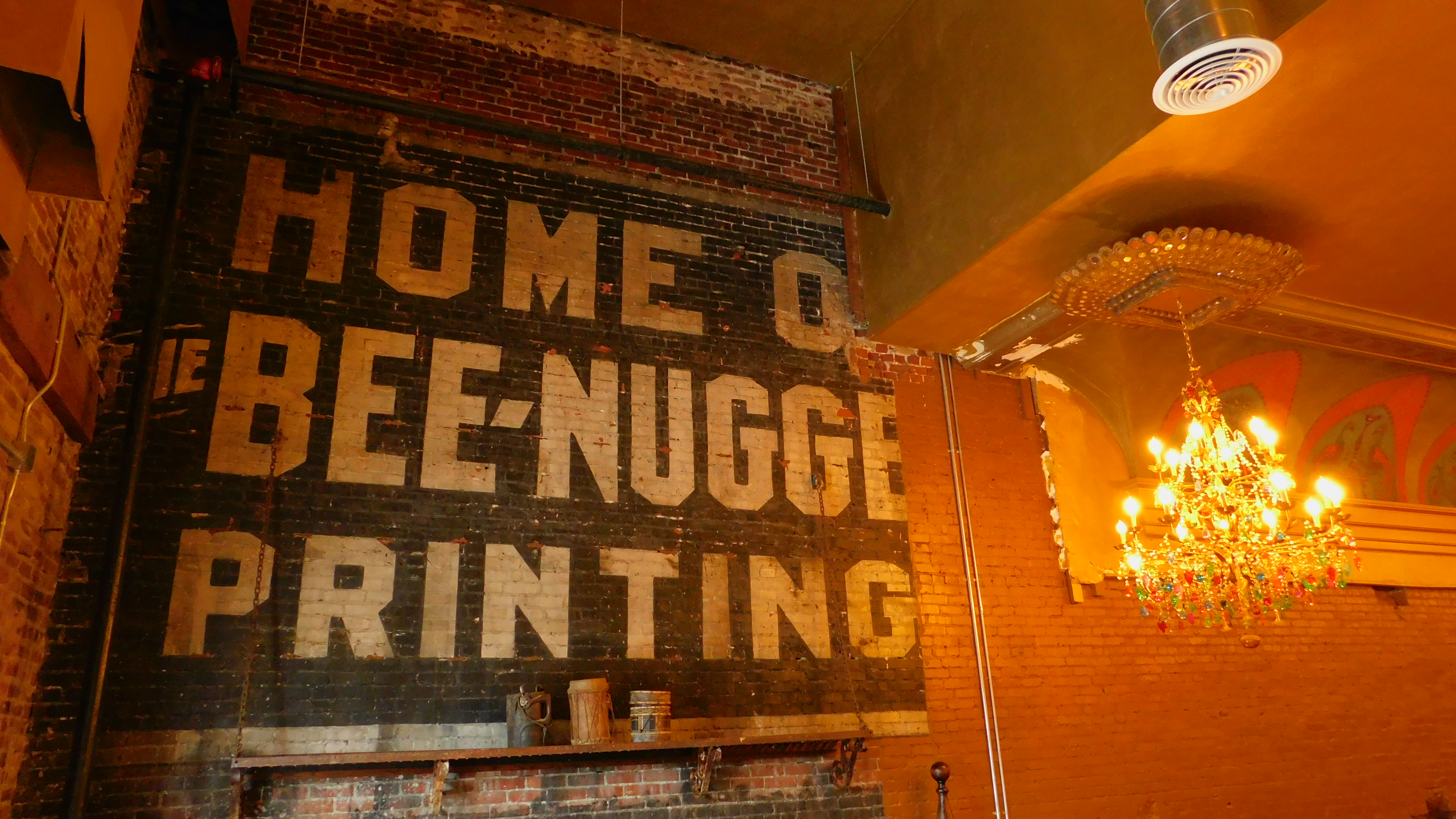
Ghost sign, Chehalis Bee-Nugget

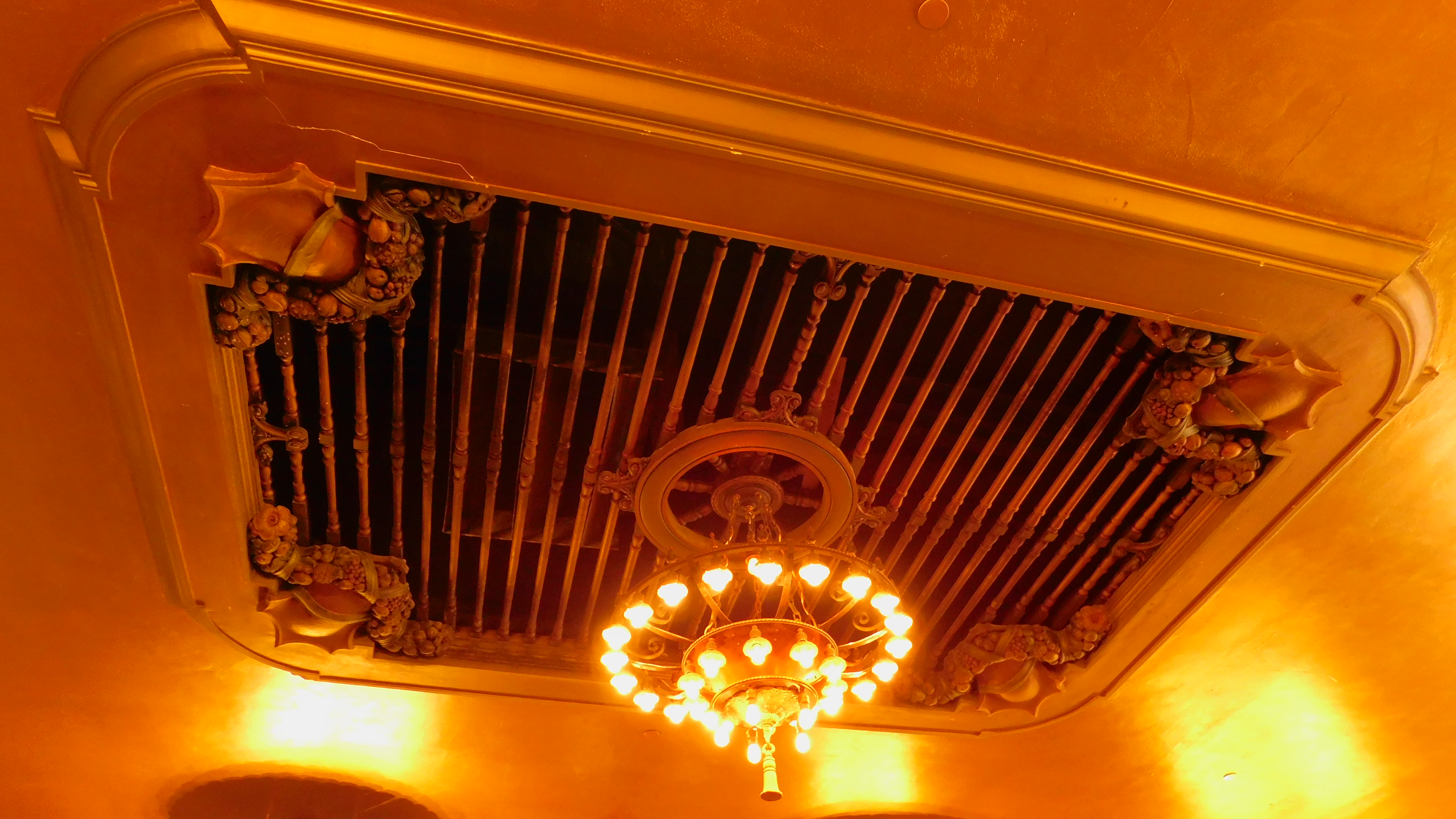
Light fixture and grill, 2019

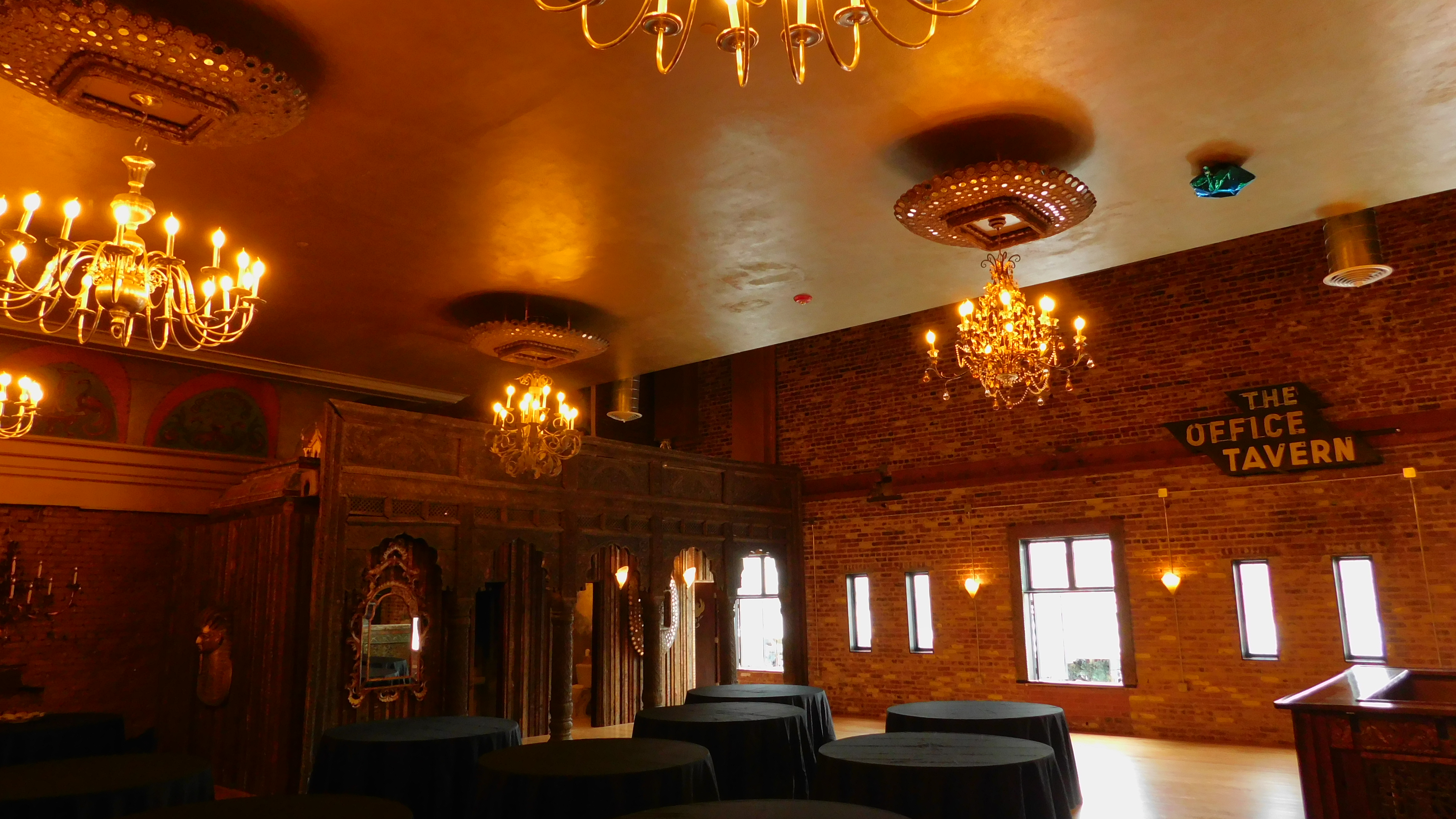
Second floor, interior, 2019
