= Streetcar (disambiguation) =

A streetcar, street car, or tram is an urban rail transit type in which vehicles, whether individual railcars or multiple-unit trains, runs primarily on streets.

This may also refer to:

== Transport ==
- Light rail, an urban rail transit type running on streets, similar to a streetcar.
  - Heritage streetcar, contemporary streetcar lines that use old-fashioned streetcars
- Wright StreetCar, a bus designed to have a tram-like appearance
- Streetcar (carsharing), the UK car club acquired by Zipcar in 2010

== Music ==
- "Street Car", a song by Canadian musician Hayden from his 2002 album Skyscraper National Park
- "Streetcar (song)", a song by Funeral for a Friend from their 2005 album Hours
- "Streetcar (Daniel Caesar song)", a song by Daniel Caesar from his 2015 extended play Pilgrim's Paradise

== See also ==
- Ford StreetKa
- A Streetcar Named Desire (disambiguation), a play by Tennessee Williams and several adaptations
