= Chehalis Theater =

Historic theater in Chehalis, Washington

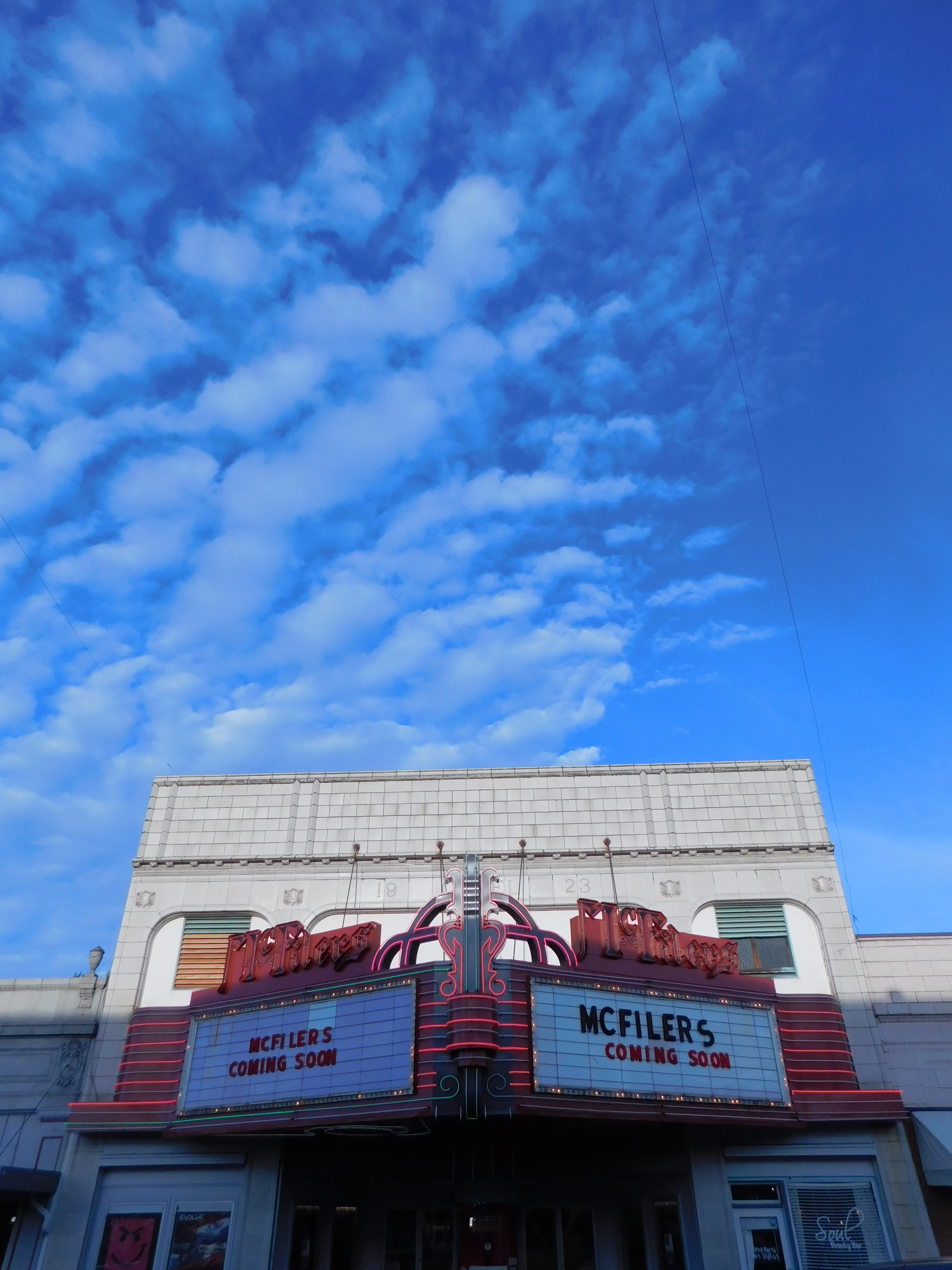
- Chehalis Theater, November 2021
- Interactive map of Chehalis Theater
- Former names: Beau Arts Building, Pix Theater, McFiler's Chehalis Theater
- Address: 558 N Market Blvd (Note: The original address was 798 Market Street before a city-wide renumbering of addresses.); Chehalis, Washington; United States of America
- Coordinates: 46°39′57″N 122°58′14″W
- Owner: McFiler's Chehalis Theater LLC
- Capacity: 450
- Screen: 1
- Current use: Film, live entertainment, restaurant
- Parking: Street

Construction
- Built: 1923
- Opened: December 7, 1938
- Renovated: 1938, 1954, 1996, 2016, 2018, 2021

Website
- chehalistheater.com

The Chehalis Theater, also as the Chehalis Theatre, is a single-screen, Art Deco movie theater located in Chehalis, Washington. The theater is situated at the north end of the National Register of Historic Places-listed Chehalis Downtown Historic District near the Hotel Washington. Known locally for hand-painted illustrations of popular children's fantasy characters that once populated the ceiling, it is the only surviving movie house in the city.

The building was first constructed in 1923 and was used as an automobile dealership and garage. The location was remodeled for use as a movie theater in 1938 and opened under the name, Pix Theater. The movie house was designed in Art Deco-style and displayed a large fluorescent-lighted marquee. The theater was closed for renovations beginning in 1953, which removed most of the original elements of the Pix. The location was reopened under the name, Chehalis Theater, the following year.

After financial difficulties of both the cinema and the city of Chehalis during the 1980s, the theater changed owners multiple times and was converted for different uses, such as a video rental store and flea market during the end of the 20th century. Brief renovations were undertaken in the 1990s and 2000s, restoring some the original Art Deco elements, and films were shown on occasion during the period. Several attempts into the early 21st century were made to reopen the location as a full-time theater, but to little success. Major renovations, which included additional attempts to restore the early design style of the theater, began in the 2010s. Several business owners over the decade reintroduced consistent film screenings and also used the location as a multi-use entertainment venue and restaurant.

A local restaurateur purchased the building in 2018, undertaking an extensive restoration effort. Reopened in 2022, the theater continued to serve as a mixed-use venue for film showings and entertainment events, with a primary focus as a restaurant.

The Chehalis Theater, recognized by city for its historical importance in 2003, is host to the Northwest Flying Saucer Film Fest.

== Theater history in Chehalis ==
The Pix Theater was the last single-screen movie house built in the city, coming at the end of a 50-year run of opera houses, auditoriums for vaudeville, and other movie theaters. Chehalis's first theater was the short-lived, mixed-use Dobson & Donahoe Opera House built in 1886, followed by a formal entertainment house known as the Tynan Opera House, built by the matriarch of the city, Eliza Tynan Saunders Barrett, in 1889.

Opera-style theaters such as the Brunswig Grand Opera House and the Geissler New Grand Opera House followed. The first theater built for use to show films was the Orpheum, opening in 1907. Additional movie houses were constructed quickly in the decade to follow, including the Dream, Bell, and Liberty theaters. The last movie theater built before the Pix was the St. Helens Theater in 1924.

The first moving picture recorded as being shown in Chehalis was at the New Grand in November 1904. The Edison Studios silent film was titled, "In the Hills of Old Carolina". A newspaper account remarked that the movie would be popular once "the public gets a little better acquainted with what is going on". The George Jessel comedy-drama, Lucky Boy, was shown at the St. Helens Theater in 1929, becoming the first talkie exhibited in the city. A spread advertisement was published in the Chehalis Bee-Nugget newspaper, with local businesses congratulating the theater on its installation of a vitaphone system.

== History of the Chehalis Theater ==
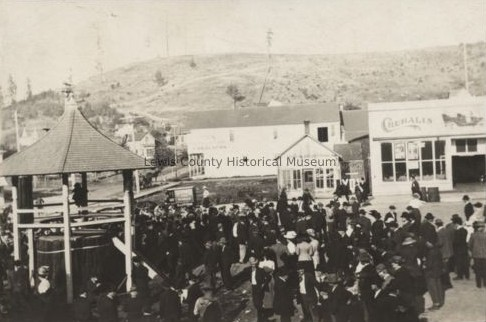
Chehalis Garage, far right, ca. 1910-1912

A wood structure that housed a horse livery and stable occupied the site as far back as 1907. The terra-cotta building was constructed in 1923 and was originally named the Beau Arts Building, and it is also known as the Gabel Building. First home to a Ford car dealership, the location became known as St. John's Garage and the Chehalis Garage. The Gabel Building was purchased in 1937 by Harold St. John, an owner of automobile dealerships, garages, and other theaters in the Twin City area.

After the structure was renovated to become a movie house, it opened on December 7, 1938, as the Pix Theater, seating 653; the first film shown was Bob Hope's Thanks for the Memory. (Note: Additional reports state that the first movie was the musical comedy, The Big Broadcast of 1938, which also starred Bob Hope.) A large newspaper spread in The Centralia Daily Chronicle was printed welcoming the theater. The Twin City Theatre Company, under the direction of Arthur St, John, were the owners of the new movie house and promised to provide first and second-run movies at "popular prices".

The Pix originally had a triangular marquee with fluorescent lighting. The theater's initial decor included a lobby with red and blue carpeting, and the theater viewing area, equipped with a balcony, had red silk lined, blue-and-gold fleur-de-lis accented walls, red velour seats, and women had access to a cosmetic room. The building had air conditioning, was fireproofed, and great measures were taken to provide clear sound and viewing angles. A pipe organ was initially installed but was relocated and rebuilt after an unknown time to a church in Fremont, Seattle. Typically shown at the theater during its early beginnings were a sequence of newsreels, cartoons, and westerns.

=== Conversion to the Chehalis Theater ===
The Pix was sold by St. John to Ted Gabel in approximately 1948, only for St. John to reacquire the movie house five years later. The building sustained damage during the 1949 Olympia earthquake but continued to operate. Closed for a major renovation beginning in 1953, the film venue was renamed Chehalis Theater (Note: A nickname was also given during the 1954 change, shortening the name to "The Chehalis".) in 1954 during the closure. (Note: There are conflicting reports in years after the name change incorrectly mentioning the change occurring in 1958. See sources within the article, post-1954, for the discrepancy.) The movie house during the renovation was under ownership of Ron Gamble as part of a theater chain company in the Twin Cities. Gamble stated that delays in reopening the theater were due to a historical record of film venues in the city continually losing money.

Reopened on September 1, 1954, the remodel included a new, no-seam screen that could show a variety of film productions, including CinemaScope and 3-D, as well as new projection equipment. The large screen required the removal of the original stage. Additional efforts included a new balcony, ceiling, heating and cooling systems, lobby and lounge area, roof, and sidewalks. A marquee from the St. Helen's Theater in Chehalis was added to the building facade during the project. The interior was redecorated, including new curtains and light fixtures, which were specifically designed for the theater. The overhaul was noted to be so extensive that the Daily Chronicle newspaper reported, "there isn't much left of the old show house except for the flooring".

=== Late 20th century operations ===
Roeww Enterprises, a theater chain in the Twin Cities, began operations at the Chehalis Theater in the early 1960s. The company installed updated sound equipment and a new screen. The Roewe family purchased the Chehalis Theater building from the estate of St. John in the early 1970s, owning and operating the movie house through the decade; the family sold the business to the Moyer theater chain company. The venue, in the 1980s, continued to operate as a movie theater, projecting films until 1988.

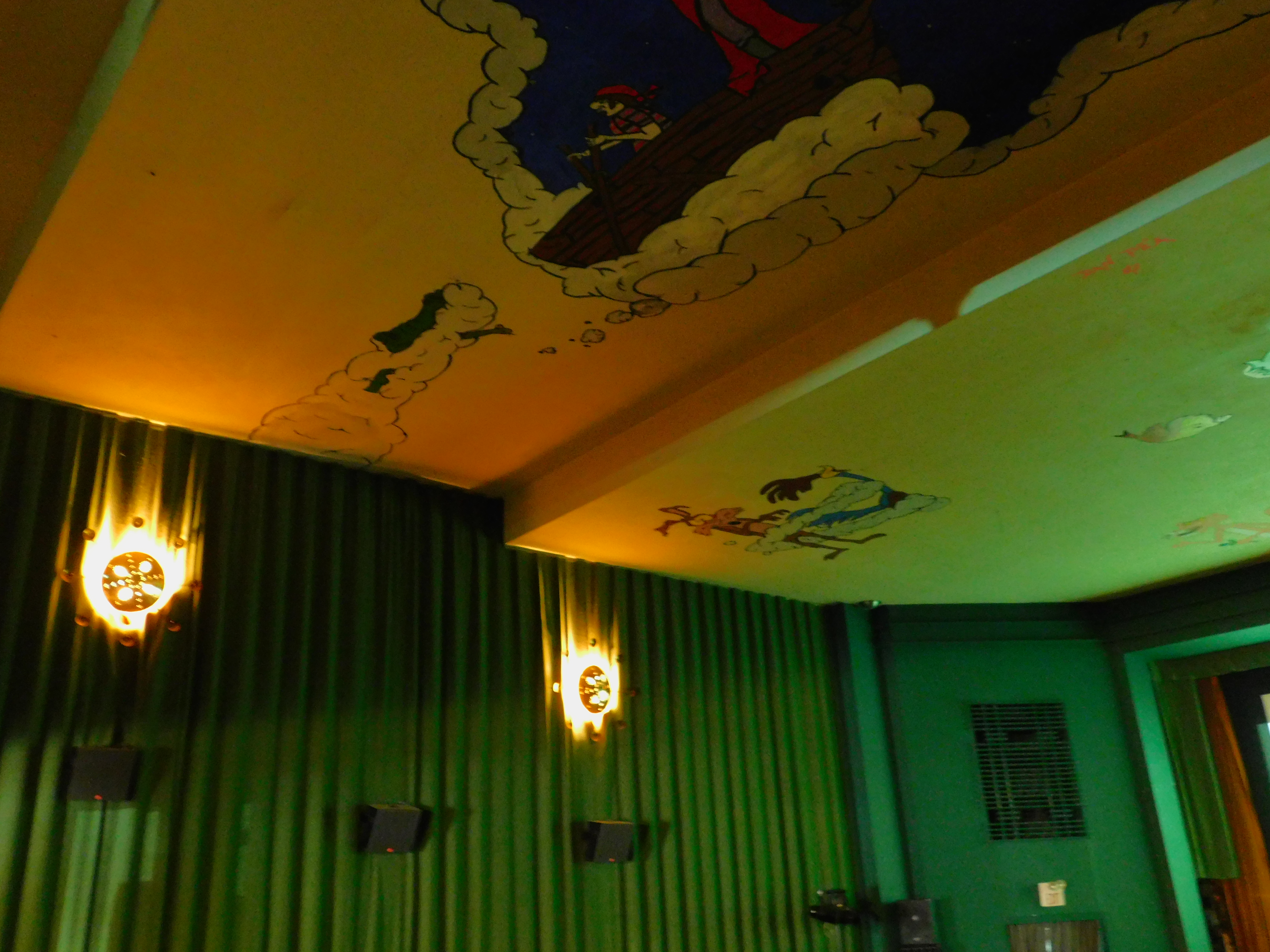
Interior, Chehalis Theater, 2019

Due to economic hardships and maintenance backlogs, the theater shut down and became a video rental store named Video Time. During this period, several murals of children's cartoon characters were painted on the ceiling. After the theater was sold in 1994 to Daryl Lund, also the owner of the Yard Birds Cinema 3 at the time, it hosted a flea market and Lund referred to both the Cinema 3 complex and the Chehalis Theater as the Chehalis Cinemas. Lund leased the theater to Jerry Rese who, along with Lund, began a large restoration in 1996, finding and reusing decor and machinery stored at the theater. The movie house at the time listed the screen to be 16 ft × 32 ft (4.9 m × 9.8 m) and the venue had a footprint of 5,000 square feet (460 m^{2}). Art Deco chandeliers, original to the theater, were found in the attic and restored. The interior had a green decor and Rese removed the original patterned theater carpeting. As the venue lacked seating, he installed 298 seats that were original to another closed theater and had the concession stand in the lobby rebuilt. There were plans to reopen the playhouse as a second-run theater. The neon marquee was restored in 2000.

The independent movie, The Immigrant Garden, premiered at the theater in 2001. In 2003, the Chehalis Historic Preservation Commission awarded the Chehalis Theater with a listing and plaque recognizing the historical importance, and restoration efforts, of the movie house. During the 2008 Washington gubernatorial election, candidate Dino Rossi held a campaign rally at the theater; the venue was recorded to have a near capacity crowd of almost 300 people.

There were brief periods of screening films into 2008, including some new releases, when the location ceased operations until 2016 due to competition with the larger, upgraded Midway Cinemas at the Lewis County Mall. There were two brief attempts to reopen the Chehalis Theater in 2009 and into the next year, but the potential revivals never came to fruition.

Chehalis Theater, 1980s

Chehalis Theater, marquee, 1980s

Marquee, detail, 1980s

Marquee, detail, 1980s

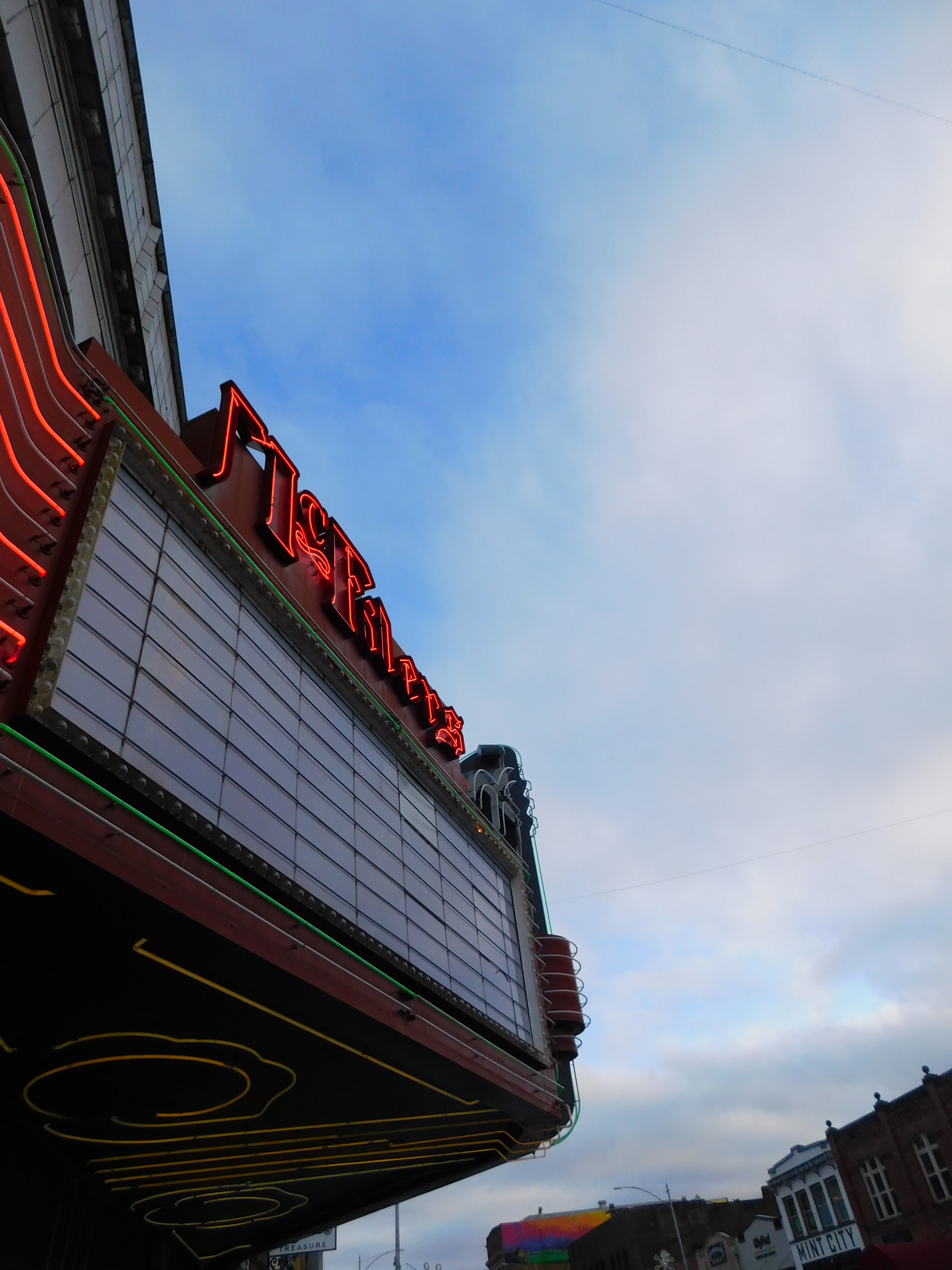
Marquee, 2025

=== 2016 and 2018 renovations ===
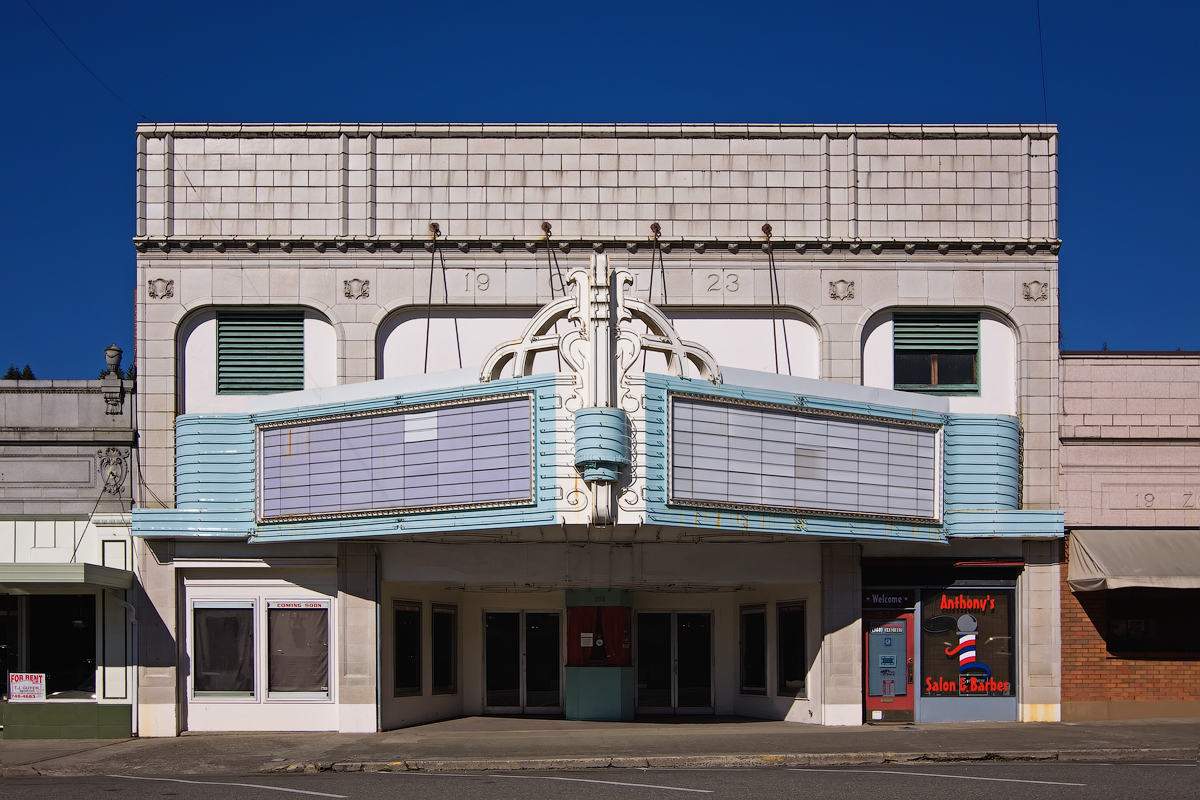
Chehalis Theater, 2011

The first renovation began in 2016 after a new owner, Ralph Hubbert, leased the building to a local proprietor. The theater contained original and antique film machinery, including a toilet in the projection room, and the balcony was intact. The restorations focused on reviving and saving much of the Art Deco style, while adding an upstairs bar, dining area, and kitchen. The theater began film showings in October, the first since late 2008, and charged $5 for admission. The first films shown were Hotel Transylvania and The Addams Family. The new proprietor added musical acts as well as live screenings of Seattle Seahawks games. The cartoon murals on the ceiling, added at an unknown time but not original to the theater, were preserved owing to the community support for the work. The occupancy was listed as 285.

In late 2018, a new lease agreement with a local Chehalis family led to additional renovations. The owners continued to screen movies and provide live musical entertainment while concentrating on pizza as the main cuisine option.

=== 2021 renovations and reopening ===
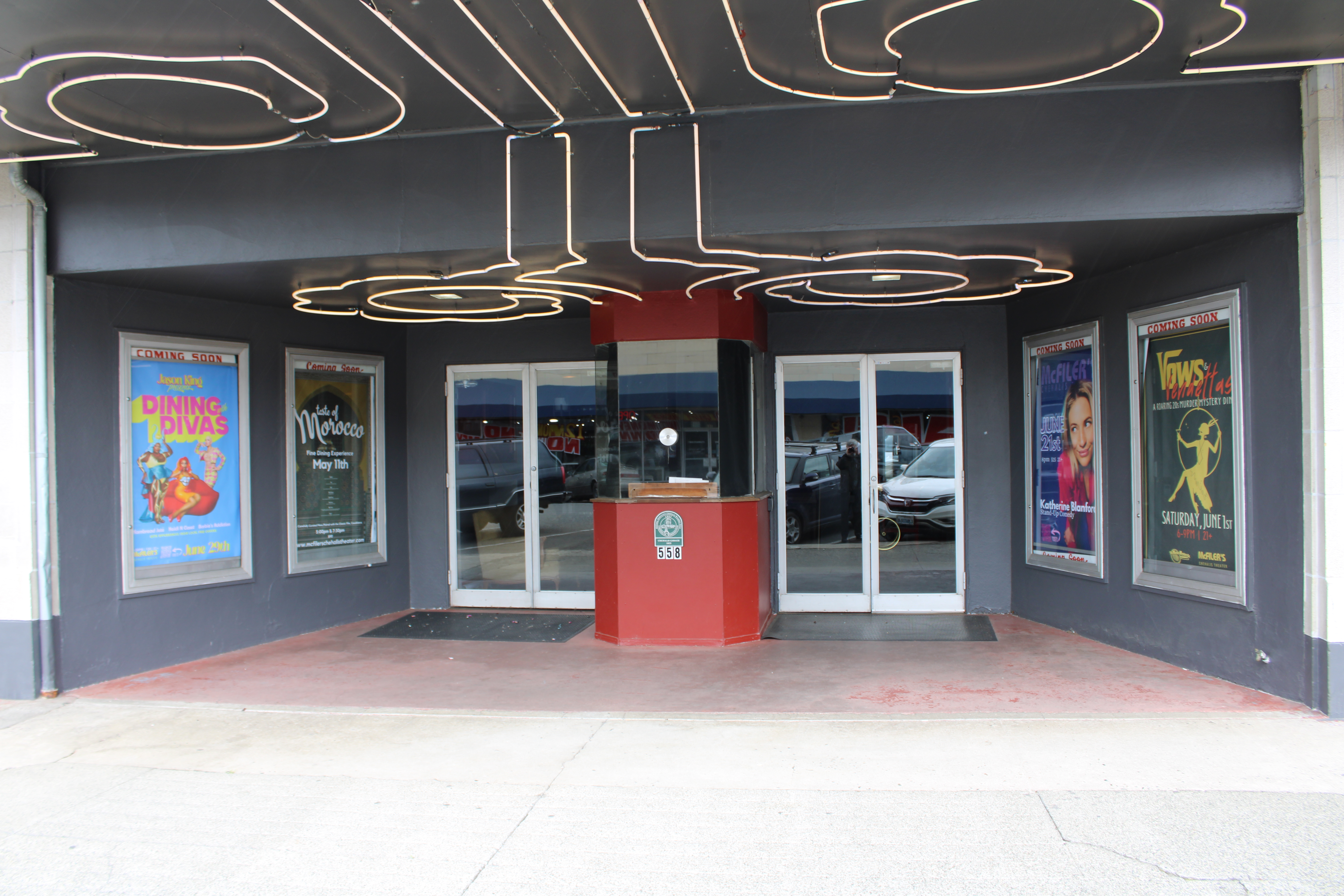
Chehalis Theater, entrance, 2024

In 2020, a local restaurateur bought the theater and started the third restoration in five years in 2021. Renaming the location as McFiler's Chehalis Theater, early plans included a reopening later that year or early 2022, with the expectation to continue to screen movies while providing restaurant dining and live entertainment. Adhering to ADA requirements and new building codes, extensive remodeling was done to large portions of the theater, including a modified marquee. The ceiling illustrations were to be painted over but photographed and displayed along with antique equipment from the building.

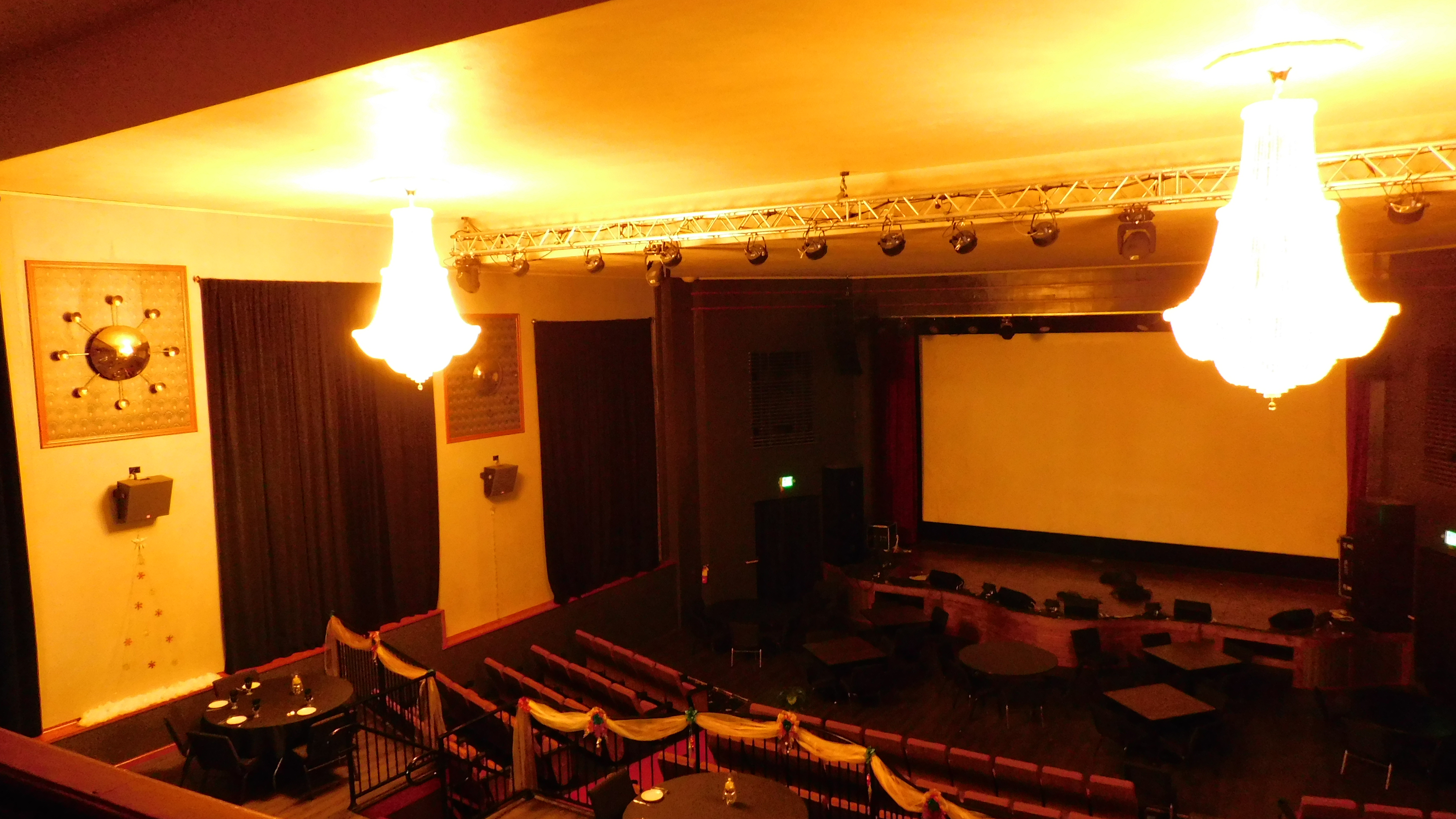
Interior, Chehalis Theater, 2023

The theater had a soft opening in late 2022, and an official ribbon-cutting ceremony took place in March 2023. The theater, since its reopening, has hosted events tied to the 75th anniversary of the Kenneth Arnold UFO sighting and a symposium on Bigfoot that included speaker Cliff Barackman.

The south wall of the cinema was renovated in early 2024; the north wall, or façade, was noted in 2025 to require up to $30,000 in repair and renovation work. A revamped restaurant, known as Limelight, was planned to open at the Chehalis Theater in December 2025.

After the theater's last renovation that began in 2021, the building was renamed McFiler's Chehalis Theater. The name was reverted back to its original moniker, the Chehalis Theater, in November 2025, due to ongoing customer confusion over the McFiler name. The ownership group also operated a separate restaurant known as "McFiler's", located one block south of the historic movie house.

As of 2026, the Chehalis Theater is permitted for a maximum occupancy of 200 (Note: In 2023, the permitted maximum occupancy was 450.) and was opened to fine dining, comedy shows, musical performances, charity events, live televised sports, and film presentations. Under McFiler's ownership, the Chehalis Theater has courted a few local controversies over the types of events held at the movie house. Opposition has been noted for drag show performances and a traveling comedy tour known as "The Dope Show" in which comedians perform a set under the influence of marijuana. The historic site has also been rented for local school productions and a variety of other, less controversial shows and events.

=== Safety concerns, 2020s ===
The theater's operations have been scrutinized over safety concerns and permitted business practices by the city since 2024. As of 2025, the city has not allowed permits for events featuring live music, such as concerts or dance parties, as the theater lacked a fire suppression system. A "dinner and show" format, where guests remain seated during performances, was adopted.

Operations at the Chehalis Theater, which also included the restaurant, were shuttered in August 2026. The city revoked the building's certificate of occupancy (COC) based on a violation notice by the City of Chehalis Planning Department, which stated that the venue was an "imminent threat to public health and safety". The actions were based on a belief that the theater was being used as a night club, which was not allowed under the permit. Theater ownership refuted the allegations and stated there were no injuries, nor illnesses, to any patron, and further mentioned that no safety issues actually occurred. A day after an appeal by the owners, the city granted a new COC, allowing the theater to reopen in September. The new permit only allows a maximum occupancy of 200 patrons; the previous limit was 299. The closure was noted to have caused a revenue loss of $20,000 and an additional loss of $10,000 in food waste; five employees of the theater lost their jobs.

== Northwest Flying Saucer Film Fest ==
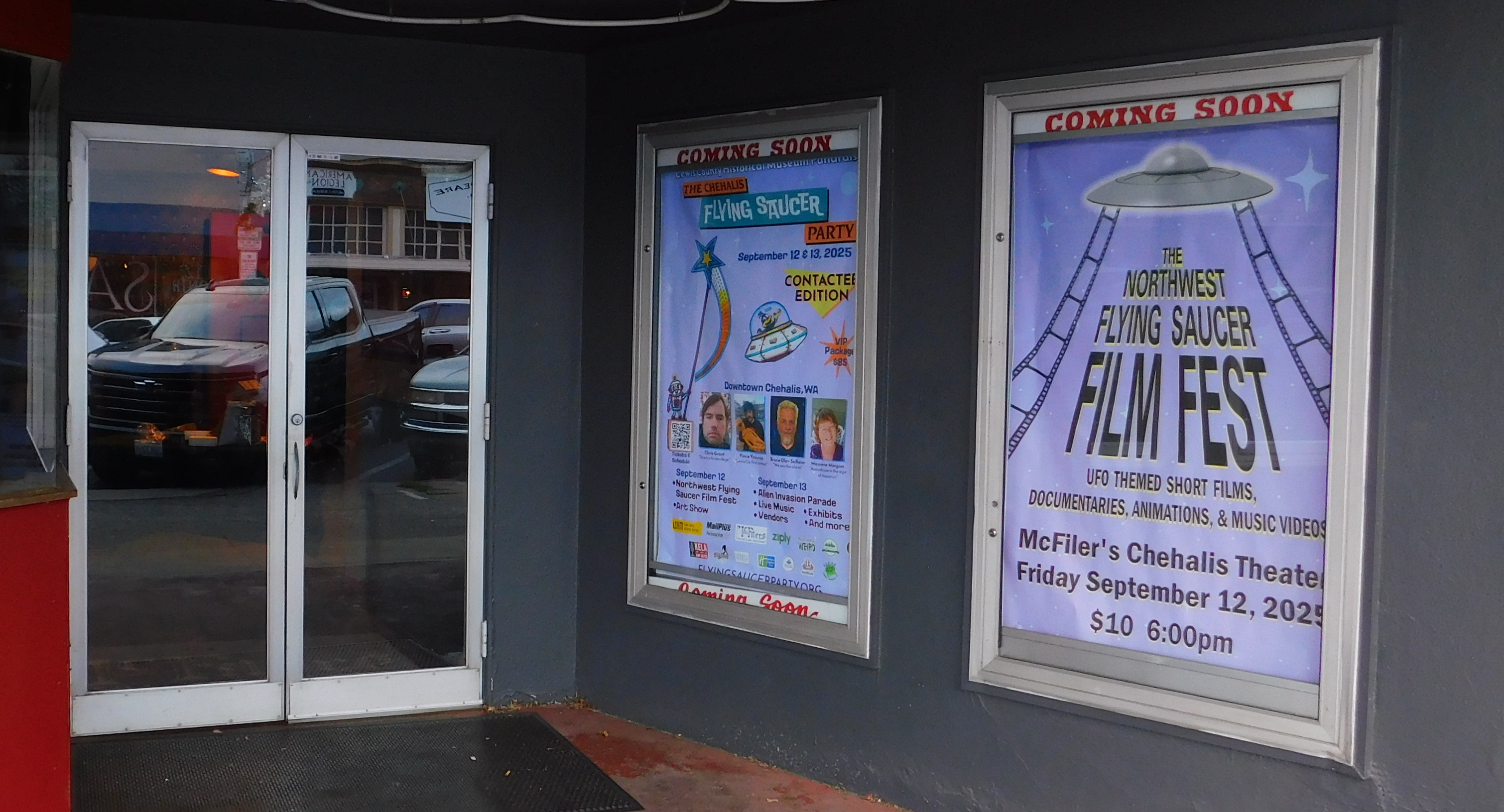
Posters, Northwest Flying Saucer Film Fest, 2025

The theater hosted the first Northwest Flying Saucer Film Fest in 2023, coinciding with the city's Flying Saucer Party. Winning films under various genres, as well as "best alien" and "best UFO", are selected by audience members and the film committee and are awarded a small statue known as the "Orbie".
