= A Streetcar Named Desire (disambiguation) =

A Streetcar Named Desire is a 1947 play by Tennessee Williams.

A Streetcar Named Desire may also refer to:

- Media based on the play:
  - A Streetcar Named Desire (1951 film), directed by Elia Kazan, starring Marlon Brando and Vivien Leigh
  - A Streetcar Named Desire (1984 film), starring Ann-Margret and Treat Williams
  - A Streetcar Named Desire (1995 film), starring Alec Baldwin and Jessica Lange
  - A Streetcar Named Desire (opera), 1995, adaptation by André Previn
  - A Streetcar Named Desire (ballet), ballet productions based on the play

== See also ==
- "A Streetcar Named Marge", an episode of The Simpsons
- Desire Street, an explanation of the play's title
