= Sporting Youth =

1924 film

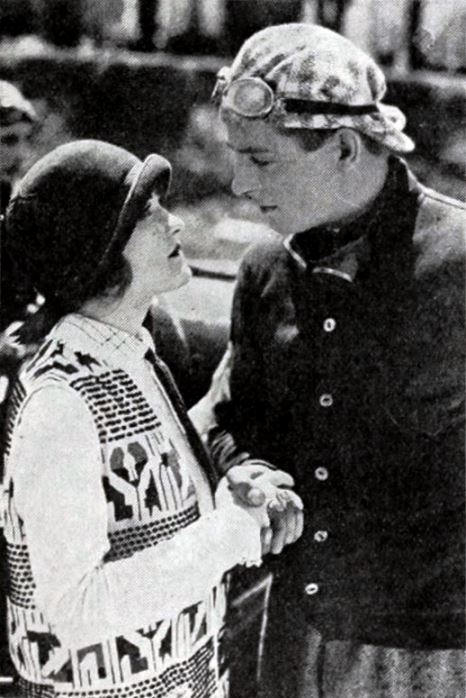
- Still with La Plante and Denny
- Directed by: Harry A. Pollard
- Written by: Harvey F. Thew
- Story by: Byron Morgan
- Produced by: Carl Laemmle
- Starring: Reginald Denny; Laura La Plante
- Cinematography: Clyde De Vinna
- Distributed by: Universal Pictures
- Release date: February 4, 1924
- Running time: 7 reels
- Country: United States
- Language: Silent (English intertitles)

Sporting Youth is a 1924 American silent comedy film directed by Harry A. Pollard and starring Reginald Denny. It was produced and distributed by Universal Pictures.

== Plot ==
As described in a film magazine review, Jimmy Wood, chauffeur, is sent with his automobile by his employer to California. He is mistaken for "Splinters" Wood, a famous British speed demon. He also meets and falls in love with Betty Rockford, the daughter of a wealthy automobile manufacturer. Jimmy enters an auto race with a $10,000 prize. The real Splinters, who is wanted by the police, also enters the race using an alias. Jimmy wins the race and, after his identity is revealed, the affections of Betty.

== Cast ==
- Reginald Denny as Jimmy Wood
- Laura La Plante as Betty Rockford
- Hallam Cooley as Walter Berg
- Frederick Vroom as John K. Walker
- Lucille Ward as Mrs. Rockford
- Malcolm Denny as "Splinters" Wood (Reginald Denny's Brother)
- Leo White as 'The Souse'
- Henry A. Barrows as William Rockford
- Rolfe Sedan as Valet
- L. J. O'Connor as The Cop
- C. L. Sherwood as Detective
- William A. Carroll as Detective

== Preservation ==
Sporting Youth is an extant film and preserved at Filmmuseum Nederlands, now called EYE Institut, and at the UCLA Film & Television Archive.
