= Twin City Railroad =

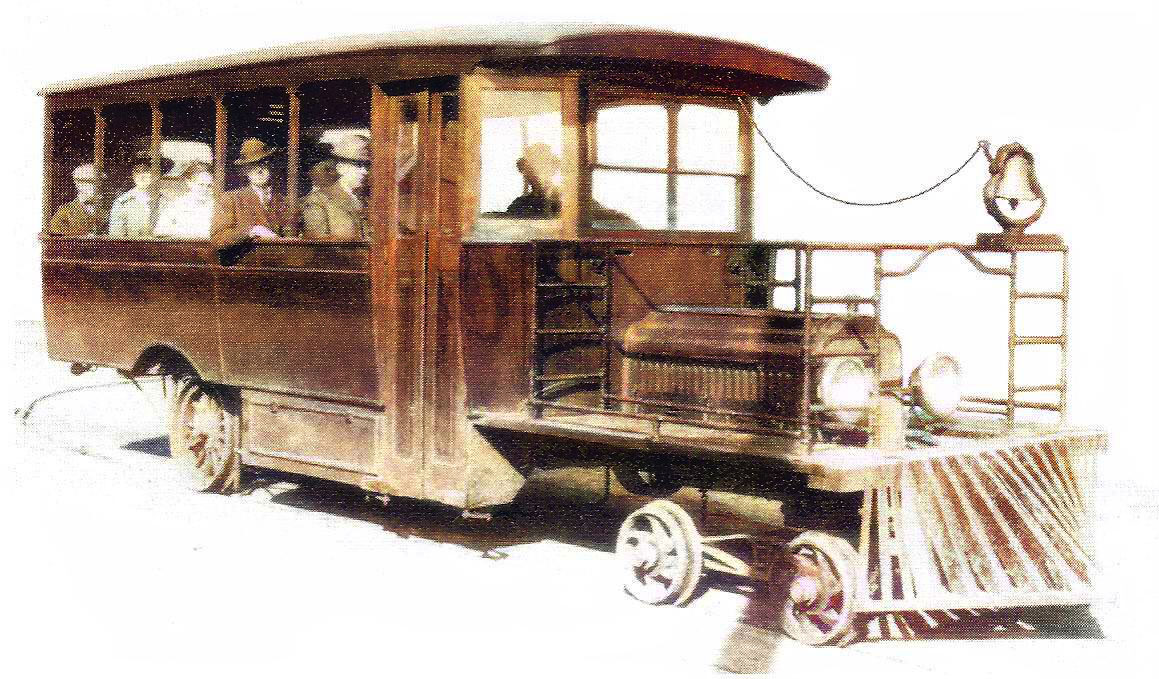
- Gallooping Goose streetcar in Chehalis, Washington, c. 1917

Overview
- Service type: Passenger service
- Status: Extinct
- First service: 27 May 1910
- Last service: 1929
- Former operators: Twin City Railroad Company, Twin City Light and Traction Company

Route
- Termini: Centralia, Washington; Chehalis, Washington

The Twin City Railroad Company was organized in 1912 as successor to the Twin City Light and Traction Company and acquired its subsidiaries, the Chehalis Electric and Traction Company and the Centralia Electric and Traction Company. Until 1936, when the line was abandoned, the company operated the 6.6 mi (10.62 km) electric line that connected the Twin Cities of Chehalis, Washington (the “Rose City”) and Centralia (the “Hub City”).

== History ==
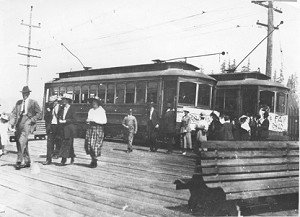
Twin City Railroad streetcars, c. 1912-1914

Early reporting mentions that a steam-powered streetcar existed in Centralia during the 1890s but ended due to the loss of the locomotive in a fire. Work to begin an electric streetcar line to connect the Twin Cities began in 1905 under the direction of the Centralia-Chehalis Electric Railway & Power Company (CCERP). Early plans to power the system was based on the construction of a dam on the Newaukum River. The Lewis County superior court awarded eminent domain and condemned property rights to CCERP allowing the company to obtain ownership of lands around the river for the project. The clearance of the right-of-way was started in 1909.

The line was reported as built under the Twin City Light & Traction Company name and the rail lines were laid from the middle of stretch, working first towards Chehalis as the final route into Centralia had not been determined. The trolley wires and electric railroad were finished in 1910 and operation of the first streetcar on the line occurred in Chehalis on May 27, 1910. The line was powered by a power plant located in nearby Coal Creek and the railroad contained a branch connecting it to a local coal mine. There were intentions to use a streetcar for employees to access the power plant.

Until the streetcar system ended, the rail was used to ferry "exhibits and livestock" to the Southwest Washington Fairgrounds which was located between the two cities. One of the cars was given the moniker, the "Tooneville Trolley".

== Ownership confusion ==
Early reporting in the area mention several companies owning, building, and/or operating the railroad line, mentioning the Centralia-Chehalis Electric Railway & Power Company, Twin City Light and Traction Company, and the Washington-Oregon Corporation.

Ownership in the Twin City Railroad Company, and its wholly owned subsidiaries, eventually fell under the Chehalis Electric and Traction Company and the Centralia Electric and Traction Company, and was sold to the Puget Sound Power and Light Company in 1923. The railroad line may have passed through the ownership of the North Coast Power Company. Some of the track was taken over by the Cowlitz, Chehalis and Cascade Railway Company (CCCRC), a Weyerhaeuser Timber Company subsidiary, and a listing in 1931 mentions that the Twin City Railroad was owned in full by W.E. Brown, the company's president, who was also a partial owner of CCCRC. The lines were managed by Stone and Webster.

== End of service ==
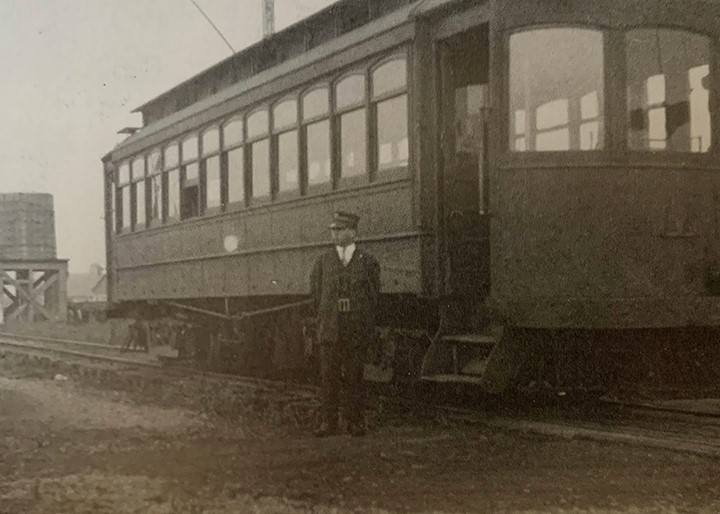
Twin City trolley, c. 1920

The passenger service ended in 1929 after the introduction of buses in the cities. In 1931, the railroad was listed as being 5.0 miles (8.0 km) in length and was denied authority to commence in interstate commerce as it was deemed a short route and therefore "not conducive to economics of transportation". Between 1932 and 1936, only 3.5 miles (5.6 km) of track were utilized for switching service. Freight was carried until 1936.

In 1936, the railroad was abandoned and the tracks sold. The new owner removed the rails and "junked" the streetcars that same year.

During an overhaul project of the roads in Chehalis's government district during 2021, several streetcar lines were found under the existing asphalt. The rail lines and wood ties were removed in order for the project to be completed.

== Route ==
Starting in Centralia, the streetcar line ran near a stretch of the former Pacific Highway, crossing over a timber overpass, and coursed by the Southwest Washington Fairgrounds. The line continued into the downtown district of Chehalis, past the Northern Pacific depot, and on to the Green Hill School.
