= KITI =

KITI or Kiti may refer to:

- Kiti, Cyprus
- KITI (AM), a radio station (1420 AM) licensed to Centralia-Chehalis, Washington, United States
- KITI-FM, a radio station (95.1 FM) licensed to Winlock, Washington, United States
- Kiti District, a district in Daykundi Province, Afghanistan

== See also ==
- Kitti (disambiguation)
