= James Kelsey =

James Kelsey may refer to:

- Jim Kelsey, American bishop
- James Kelsey (sculptor), American sculptor
