= Kitti =

Kitti may refer to:

- Kitti's hog-nosed bat
- Kitti, Federated States of Micronesia
- Kitti (name)
  - Marko Kitti
  - Kitti Thonglongya
  - Kitti Kudor
  - Kitti Gróz
  - Kitti Becséri
  - Kitti Sri Megha

== See also ==
- Kiti (disambiguation)
