= KCED =

- Centralia, Washington; United States
- Frequency: 91.3 MHz

Programming
- Format: Alternative rock

Ownership
- Owner: Centralia College

History
- First air date: 1975

Technical information
- Licensing authority: FCC
- Facility ID: 63026
- Class: A
- ERP: 1,000 watts
- HAAT: -22 meters
- Transmitter coordinates: 46°42′56″N 122°57′48″W

Links
- Public license information: Public file; LMS
- Webcast: Listen live
- Website: centralia.edu/kced/

KCED (91.3 FM) is a college radio station licensed to Centralia, Washington. The station, which serves the Centralia-Chehalis area of Lewis County, is owned by Centralia College. KCED's programming focuses on Alternative rock, a format originally forged by college radio stations in the 1980s and that evolved in subsequent years to reach a broader audience. The station broadcasts with an effective radiated power of 1,000 watts.

== See also ==
- Campus radio
- List of college radio stations in the United States
