= Centralia, Washington =

City in Washington, United States

Centralia
- City
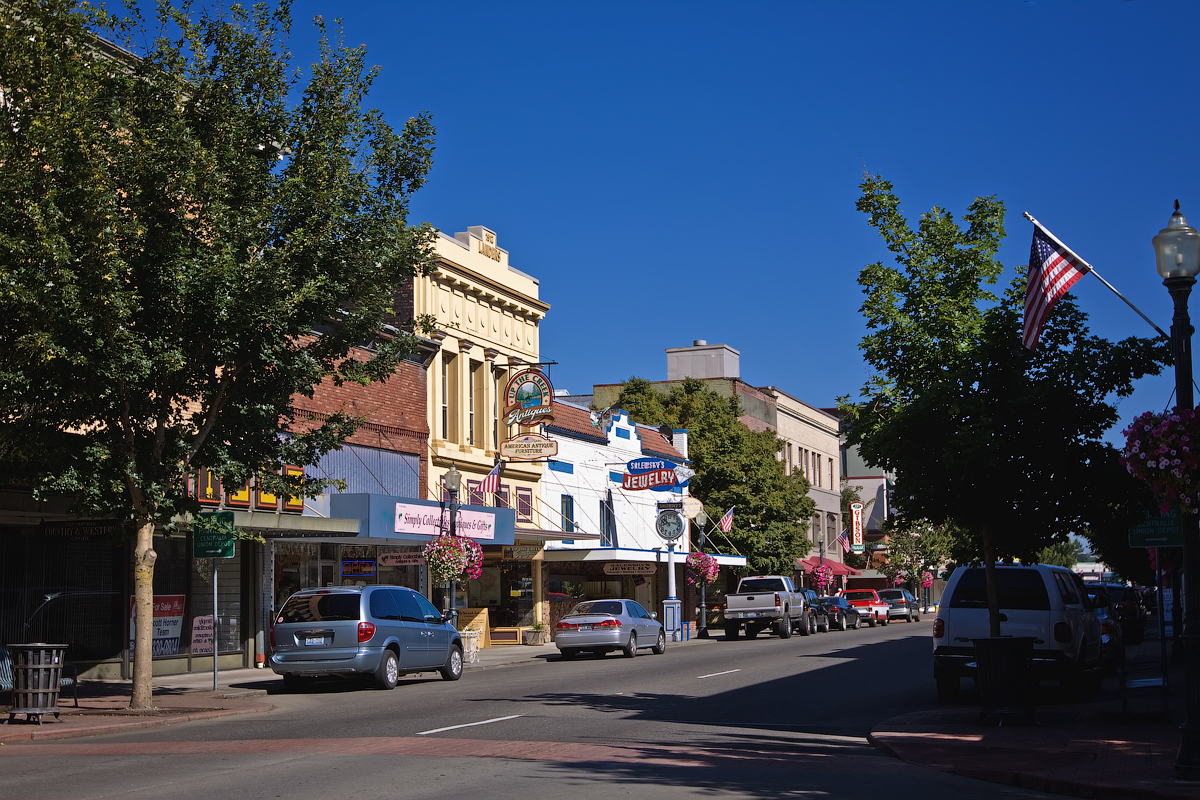
- Centralia downtown historic district

- Flag Logo
- Nicknames: Hub City, City of Azaleas
- Interactive map of Centralia
- Coordinates: 46°43′54″N 122°58′10″W
- Country: United States
- State: Washington
- County: Lewis

Government
  - Type: Council–manager
  - Mayor: Chris Brewer

Area
  - Total: 7.81 sq mi (20.22 km^{2})
  - Land: 7.62 sq mi (19.74 km^{2})
  - Water: 0.19 sq mi (0.48 km^{2})
- Elevation: 164 ft (50 m)

Population (2020)
  - Total: 18,183
  - Estimate (2024): 19,061
  - Density: 2,385.7/sq mi (921.12/km^{2})
- Time zone: UTC-8 (PST)
  - Summer (DST): UTC-7 (PDT)
- ZIP Code: 98531
- Area code(s): 360, 564
- FIPS code: 53-11160
- GNIS feature ID: 2409429
- Website: cityofcentralia.com

Centralia (/sɛnˈtreɪliə/) is a city in Lewis County, Washington, United States. It is located along Interstate 5 near the midpoint between Seattle and Portland, Oregon. The city had a population of 18,183 at the 2020 census. Centralia is twinned with Chehalis, located to the south near the confluence of the Chehalis and Newaukum rivers.

== History ==
=== Skookumchuck ===
The area was first settled by the Upper Chehalis people, who had several villages at the confluence of the Skookumchuck and Chehalis rivers. The first non-indigenous settlers arrived in 1845. In 1850, J. G. Cochran and his wife Anna were led there via the Oregon Trail by their adopted son, George Washington, a free African-American. The family feared Washington would be forced into slavery if they stayed in Missouri after the passage of the Compromise of 1850. Cochran filed a donation land claim near the Borst Home in 1852 and was able to sell his claim to Washington for $6,000 because, unlike the neighboring Oregon Territory, there was no restriction against passing legal ownership of land to African Americans in the newly formed Washington Territory.

The town was originally called Skookumchuck after the nearby river, itself named for a Chinook Jargon word meaning "rapids." As it grew, local Upper Chehalis people continued to live there each summer for the harvest, and some took jobs in town. However, their community was devastated by a smallpox epidemic in 1852, and after they abandoned a nearby village, settlers burned it down. Skookumchuck settlers then built and moved into Fort Henness near the site, worried that the Upper Chehalis would attack them during the Puget Sound War. A few settlers remained in town, with one writing that he saw the fort as "injurious to our friendship". The Upper Chehalis did not fight in the war and remained connected to Skookumchuck. Although the Upper Chehalis had not signed the Treaty of Point Elliott due to concerns over the reservation terms, some moved to the Chehalis Reservation when it was created in 1864.

The Skookumchuck community was connected to the Columbia and Puget Sound regions via the first major road in the area in 1857. In the 1850s and 1860s, Centralia's Borst Home, at the confluence of the Chehalis and Skookumchuck Rivers, was the site of a toll ferry, and the halfway stopping point for stagecoaches operating between Kalama, Washington and Tacoma.

=== Centerville and Centralia ===
Upon hearing of the imminent arrival of the Northern Pacific Railway (NP) in 1872, Washington and his wife, Mary Jane, filed a plat for the town of Centerville, naming the streets with a Biblical theme, and offering lots for $10 each with one lot free to buyers who built houses. Washington also donated land for a city park, a cemetery, and a Baptist church. Responding to new settlers' concern about a town in Klickitat County with the same name, the town was renamed Centralia by 1883, as suggested by a recent settler from Centralia, Illinois, and officially incorporated on February 3, 1886. The town's population boomed, then collapsed in the Panic of 1893, when the NP went bankrupt; entire city blocks were offered for as little as $50 with no takers. Washington (despite facing racial prejudice from some newcomers) made personal loans and forgave debt to keep the town afloat until the economy stabilized; the city then boomed again based on the coal, lumber and dairying industries. When Washington died in 1905, all businesses in the town closed, and 5,000 mourners attended his funeral. The city bestowed an honor to Washington in 2023 by declaring August 15, his recognized birthday, as Centralia's Founder's Day.

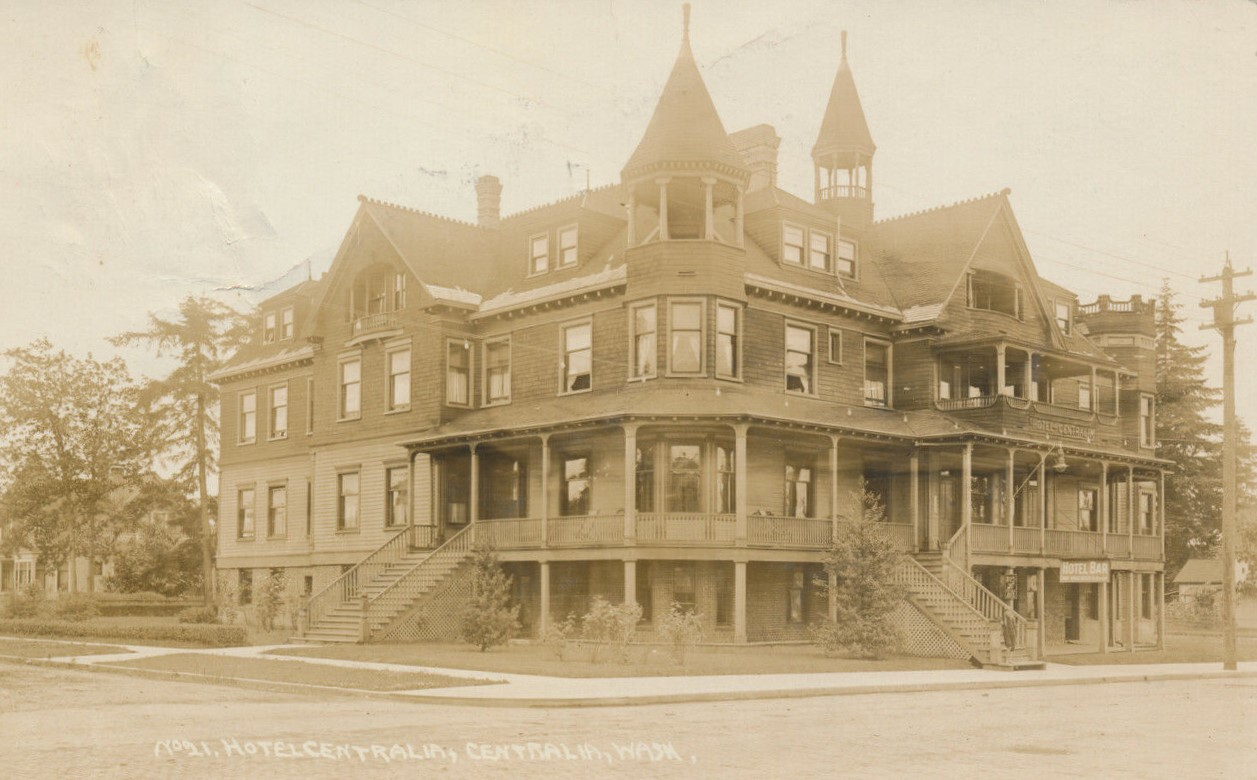
Centralia Hotel seen in a postcard view from June 17, 1913

A large fire on June 26, 1908, part of a string of arson attempts spanning between the Twin Cities that month, decimated a block in the city's downtown district. The early morning blaze, which began at the Star Saloon, caused the loss of twelve buildings but only one person was reported injured.

On November 11, 1919, the Centralia Massacre occurred. Spurred on by local lumber barons, American Legionnaires (many of whom had returned from WWI to find their jobs filled by pro-union members of the Industrial Workers of the World (IWW)), used the Armistice Day parade to attack the IWW hall. Marching unarmed, the Legionnaires broke from the parade and stormed the hall in an effort to bust union organizing efforts by what was seen to be a Bolshevik-inspired labor movement. IWW workers including recently returned WWI veteran Wesley Everest, stood their ground, engaged and killed four Legionnaires. Everest was captured, jailed and then brutally lynched. Other IWW members were also jailed. The event made international headlines, and coupled with similar actions in Everett, Washington and other lumber towns, stifled the American labor movement until the economic devastation of the 1930s Great Depression changed opinions about labor organizations.

During the Great Depression, Centralia's lumber industry contracted, and many sawmills shut down. However, lumber and mining remained Centralia's main industries over the next decades, and Centralia had Washington state's largest open-pit mine during the 1960s. In the 1980s, Centralia's downtown revitalized as a historic retail core. Centralia's TransAlta mine, the last coal mine in the state, closed in 2006.

The town's name was originally a reference to the town's location as the midway point between Tacoma and Kalama, which were originally the NP's Washington termini. This central moniker continued to have longevity when it became the midpoint between Seattle and Portland, Oregon after the constructions of Interstate 5 and its predecessor, U.S. Route 99.

== Geography ==
According to the United States Census Bureau, the city has a total area of 7.56 square miles (19.58 km^{2}), of which, 7.42 square miles (19.22 km^{2}) is land and 0.14 square miles (0.36 km^{2}) is water.

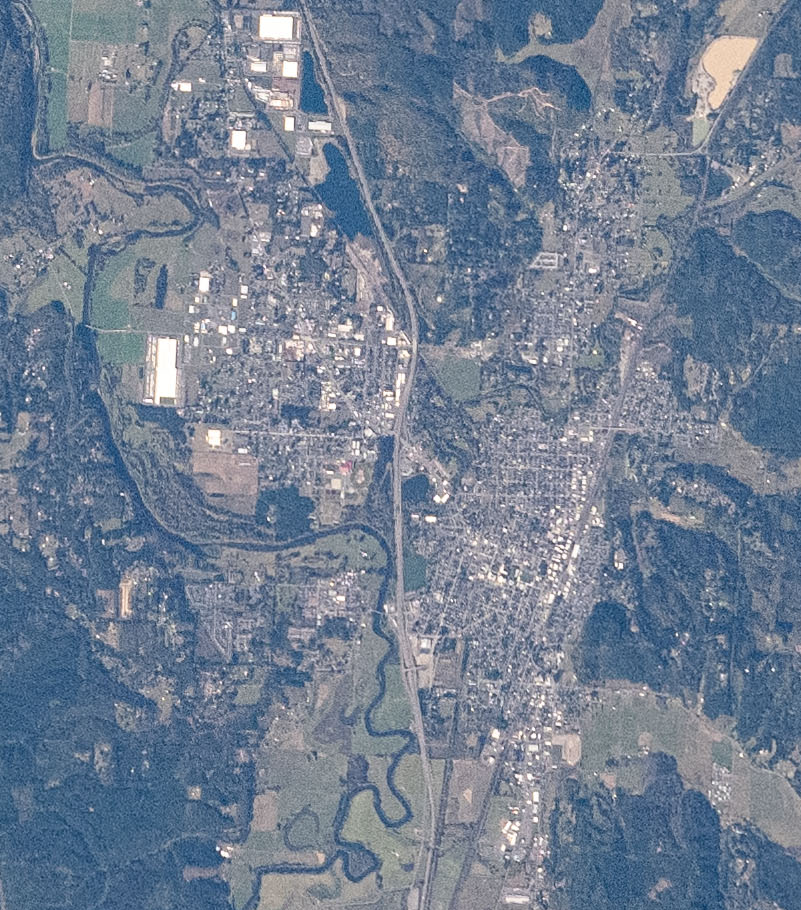
View from Expedition 72, October 2024

=== Landforms ===
Located off Interstate 5 is Plummer Lake, a small body of water caused by the excavation of glacial rock for gravel purposes beginning in 1910. The lake is named after Sydney Plummer, owner of the quarry and excavating company at the time. As of 2017, Plummer Lake is privately owned.

=== Climate ===
This region experiences warm (but not hot) and dry summers, with no average monthly temperatures above 71.6 °F. According to the Köppen Climate Classification system, Centralia has a warm-summer Mediterranean climate, abbreviated "Csb" on climate maps. Temperatures are usually quite mild, although Centralia is generally warmer in the summer and colder in the winter than locations further north along the Puget Sound.

Climate data for Centralia, Washington, 1991–2020 normals, extremes 1893–present
Month	Jan	Feb	Mar	Apr	May	Jun	Jul	Aug	Sep	Oct	Nov	Dec	Year
Record high °F (°C)	68 (20)	75 (24)	85 (29)	93 (34)	98 (37)	107 (42)	107 (42)	103 (39)	100 (38)	92 (33)	75 (24)	73 (23)	107 (42)
Mean maximum °F (°C)	57.1 (13.9)	60.8 (16.0)	69.3 (20.7)	77.8 (25.4)	84.8 (29.3)	88.0 (31.1)	93.7 (34.3)	93.1 (33.9)	87.6 (30.9)	76.0 (24.4)	62.3 (16.8)	56.1 (13.4)	96.8 (36.0)
Mean daily maximum °F (°C)	46.1 (7.8)	49.5 (9.7)	54.1 (12.3)	59.5 (15.3)	66.6 (19.2)	71.1 (21.7)	77.5 (25.3)	78.2 (25.7)	72.6 (22.6)	61.1 (16.2)	50.7 (10.4)	45.0 (7.2)	61.0 (16.1)
Daily mean °F (°C)	40.2 (4.6)	41.7 (5.4)	45.0 (7.2)	49.3 (9.6)	55.5 (13.1)	60.1 (15.6)	65.2 (18.4)	65.5 (18.6)	60.5 (15.8)	51.9 (11.1)	43.9 (6.6)	39.4 (4.1)	51.5 (10.8)
Mean daily minimum °F (°C)	34.2 (1.2)	33.9 (1.1)	35.9 (2.2)	39.1 (3.9)	44.4 (6.9)	49.1 (9.5)	52.9 (11.6)	52.8 (11.6)	48.4 (9.1)	42.7 (5.9)	37.1 (2.8)	33.9 (1.1)	42.0 (5.6)
Mean minimum °F (°C)	22.8 (−5.1)	23.2 (−4.9)	27.0 (−2.8)	30.8 (−0.7)	35.3 (1.8)	41.8 (5.4)	45.9 (7.7)	45.8 (7.7)	39.8 (4.3)	31.1 (−0.5)	25.2 (−3.8)	22.2 (−5.4)	17.3 (−8.2)
Record low °F (°C)	−4 (−20)	0 (−18)	13 (−11)	20 (−7)	27 (−3)	31 (−1)	33 (1)	35 (2)	24 (−4)	20 (−7)	5 (−15)	0 (−18)	−4 (−20)
Average precipitation inches (mm)	5.85 (149)	4.24 (108)	4.39 (112)	3.24 (82)	2.44 (62)	1.53 (39)	0.50 (13)	0.84 (21)	1.59 (40)	4.00 (102)	6.53 (166)	6.44 (164)	41.59 (1,058)
Average snowfall inches (cm)	3.4 (8.6)	1.4 (3.6)	0.5 (1.3)	0.0 (0.0)	0.0 (0.0)	0.0 (0.0)	0.0 (0.0)	0.0 (0.0)	0.0 (0.0)	0.0 (0.0)	0.4 (1.0)	0.9 (2.3)	6.6 (16.8)
Average precipitation days (≥ 0.01 in)	21.7	17.6	19.5	17.1	12.1	8.9	3.9	4.6	8.1	15.6	21.1	22.1	172.3
Average snowy days (≥ 0.1 in)	1.6	0.6	0.3	0.1	0.0	0.0	0.0	0.0	0.0	0.0	0.2	0.6	3.4
Source 1: NOAA
Source 2: National Weather Service

== Demographics ==
Historical population
Census	Pop.	Note	%±
1890	2,026		—
1900	1,600		−21.0%
1910	7,311		356.9%
1920	7,549		3.3%
1930	8,058		6.7%
1940	7,414		−8.0%
1950	8,657		16.8%
1960	8,586		−0.8%
1970	10,054		17.1%
1980	11,555		14.9%
1990	12,101		4.7%
2000	14,742		21.8%
2010	16,336		10.8%
2020	18,183		11.3%
2024 (est.)	19,061		4.8%
U.S. Decennial Census; 2020 Census

=== 2020 census ===
As of the 2020 census, Centralia had a population of 18,183 and the median age was 37.1 years.

23.7% of residents were under the age of 18, 19.0% were 65 years of age or older, and for every 100 females there were 95.3 males, while for every 100 females age 18 and over there were 91.0 males age 18 and over.

98.6% of residents lived in urban areas, while 1.4% lived in rural areas.

There were 7,127 households in Centralia, of which 29.7% had children under the age of 18 living in them. Of all households, 35.8% were married-couple households, 20.4% were households with a male householder and no spouse or partner present, and 33.4% were households with a female householder and no spouse or partner present. About 32.3% of all households were made up of individuals and 15.6% had someone living alone who was 65 years of age or older.

There were 7,594 housing units, of which 6.1% were vacant. The homeowner vacancy rate was 1.9% and the rental vacancy rate was 5.4%.

Racial composition as of the 2020 census
Race	Number	Percent
White	13,594	74.8%
Black or African American	200	1.1%
American Indian and Alaska Native	264	1.5%
Asian	244	1.3%
Native Hawaiian and Other Pacific Islander	47	0.3%
Some other race	1,734	9.5%
Two or more races	2,100	11.5%
Hispanic or Latino (of any race)	3,457	19.0%

=== 2010 census ===
As of the 2010 census, there were 16,336 people, 6,640 households, and 3,867 families residing in the city. The population density was 2,201.6 inhabitants per square mile (850.0/km^{2}). There were 7,265 housing units at an average density of 979.1 per square mile (378.0/km^{2}). The racial makeup of the city was 85.1% White, 0.6% African American, 1.4% Native American, 1.0% Asian, 0.3% Pacific Islander, 7.4% from other races, and 4.1% from two or more races. Hispanic or Latino people of any race were 16.1% of the population.

There were 6,640 households, of which 31.6% had children under the age of 18 living with them, 37.7% were married couples living together, 14.4% had a female householder with no husband present, 6.1% had a male householder with no wife present, and 41.8% were non-families. 33.8% of all households were made up of individuals, and 15.8% had someone living alone who was 65 years of age or older. The average household size was 2.41 and the average family size was 3.06.

The median age in the city was 34.8 years. 24.7% of residents were under the age of 18; 10.7% were between the ages of 18 and 24; 25.7% were from 25 to 44; 22.3% were from 45 to 64; and 16.6% were 65 years of age or older. The gender makeup of the city was 48.3% male and 51.7% female.

=== 2000 census ===
As of the 2000 census, there were 14,742 people, 5,943 households, and 3,565 families residing in the city. The population density was 1,990.6 people per square mile (768.1/km^{2}). There were 6,510 housing units at an average density of 879.0 per square mile (339.2/km^{2}). The racial makeup of the city was 89.76% White, 0.44% African American, 1.25% Native American, 0.94% Asian, 0.30% Pacific Islander, 4.94% from other races, and 2.38% from two or more races. Hispanic or Latino people of any race were 10.22% of the population.

There were 5,943 households, out of which 29.4% had children under the age of 18 living with them, 41.7% were married couples living together, 13.0% had a female householder with no husband present, and 40.0% were non-families. 32.7% of all households were made up of individuals, and 16.9% had someone living alone who was 65 years of age or older. The average household size was 2.40 and the average family size was 3.02.

In the city, the population was spread out, with 25.2% under the age of 18, 10.5% from 18 to 24, 25.7% from 25 to 44, 19.4% from 45 to 64, and 19.2% who were 65 years of age or older. The median age was 37 years. For every 100 females, there were 89.8 males. For every 100 females age 18 and over, there were 86.6 males.

The median income for a household in the city was $30,078, and the median income for a family was $35,684. Males had a median income of $31,595 versus $22,076 for females. The per capita income for the city was $16,305. About 13.6% of families and 18.0% of the population were below the poverty line, including 24.4% of those under age 18 and 10.8% of those age 65 or over.

== Economy and employment ==
Founded as a railroad town, Centralia's economy was originally dependent on such industries as railroads and timber, as well as coal and agriculture. At one time, five railroad lines crossed in Centralia, including the Union Pacific Railroad, Northern Pacific Railway, Milwaukee Road, Great Northern Railroad and a short line.

The explosion of Mount St. Helens on May 18, 1980, devastated the local lumber industry, as 12 million board feet of stockpiled lumber and 4 billion board feet of salable timber was damaged or destroyed. Unemployment surged to double digits, and the town lost most of its retail base.

In 1988, London Fog opened the first factory outlet store in the Northwest, choosing the location because it was the midpoint between major northwest cities. Their success spawned the region's first factory outlet center, creating a tourist shopping destination. This led in turn to the redevelopment of the vintage downtown marketplace as an antique, art and specialty store destination.

The Port of Centralia, created in 1986 and located northwest of the city center near Fords Prairie, is a complex of industrial and mixed-use economic development in the municipality. Developed during the 1980s decline of the city's dependable lumber-based economy, the port began constructing its base of operations in 1988 and the first tenant arrived in 1990. It won an award for port of the year in 1994 and became part of a foreign-trade zone in conjunction with other local counties in western Washington. The port expanded into a second phase in 2003. As of 2016, the Port of Centralia is composed of a mix of three zones with 30 tenants that employed 800 people.

Chehalis Mints was founded in the city in 1994 and produces various mint and mint chocolate candies, with a specialty in butter mints. The company's products are sold primarily in the Pacific Northwest.

As extractive industries faced decline, Centralia's development refocused on freeway oriented food, lodging, retail and tourism, as well as regional shipping and warehousing facilities, leading to 60 percent growth in population since the 1980s. Additional development of regional distribution and transportation facilities, along with in-migration from retirees from more populated counties to the north, have helped diversify the economy, though unemployment remains stubbornly high and per-capita income well below the state average.

=== TransAlta Coal Mine and Power Plant ===
On November 28, 2006, it was announced that TransAlta, the largest employer in Centralia and operator of the Centralia Coal Mine and Centralia Power Plant, would eliminate over 550 coal mining jobs; the coal mine was the last operational mine in the state. The mine, which spread over 14,000 acres (5,700 ha), had been owned by TransAlta since 2000. The company offered land donations to the city, as well as financial contributions to the local community to offset economic losses, in the wake of the closure. Despite fears that the city would suffer economically from the closure, there was little noticeable economic effect upon the City of Centralia as a result. Data indicated that Centralia was experiencing growth both in its light industrial areas as well as its core business district, the historic downtown Centralia. The mine has since undergone a reclamation to fill, regrade, dredge water sources, and plant new trees. As of 2023, half of the reclamation project was considered complete. The site has been determined as a potential recreation area once the recovery processes are complete. During the mine's opening, 160,000,000 tonnes (2.5×10^{10} st) of coal were extracted and used at the plant.

The power plant, completed in two unit stages in the early 1970s and owned by TransAlta since 2000, is Washington state's last energy factory powered by coal. At its peak, it generated energy ample enough to power Los Angeles. The plant is situated on 11,000 acres (4,500 ha) and is expected to permanently close in 2025 based on an agreement reached with the state in 2011. The first phase of the shutdown was completed in 2020. The energy produced until its closure is used by Puget Sound Energy (PSE) and according to 2022 figures, 14.5% of PSE's electric load came from the TransAlta coal plant, enough to supply power to 300,000 homes. Future plans include the operating of several green energy facilities, including generating power via hydrogen and fusion, and the decommissioning of the Centralia Coal Mine is expected to incorporate renewable energy machinery as the coal plant closes.

During the closures, TransAlta created a $20 million fund for training and educational work programs for remaining employees of the plant. Part of a larger Centralia Coal Transition Grants initiative, other grants include millions for energy efficiency and technology for nearby communities and schools. The land at the site has slowly been reclaimed for public and commercial use, including the planting of trees and maintaining wetland areas.

== Arts and culture ==
=== Festivals and events ===
Centralia has hosted the annual Hub City Car Show since the early 2000s. The one-day event, usually held in late summer, is held in the downtown district, shutting down the main artery through the historic center of the city.

The Centralia Campout is an annual, week-long gathering of folk musicians that takes place between the second and third weekends in August. The campout centers around American Old-time music, played in jam circles round the clock. Attendees engage in daily dances, workshops, and musical fellowship.

The Centralia Lighted Tractor Parade has been an annual winter holiday event since 2009. Hosted by the Centralia Downtown Association in early December, the parade begins at Centralia College and traverses through the core downtown district. The festival nominates a local resident, recognized for their contributions to the community, as a Grand marshal.

Girls Night Out is a bi-annual business and shopping event. Begun in 2008, the event supports the downtown economy while raising funds for local charities.

=== Historic buildings and sites ===
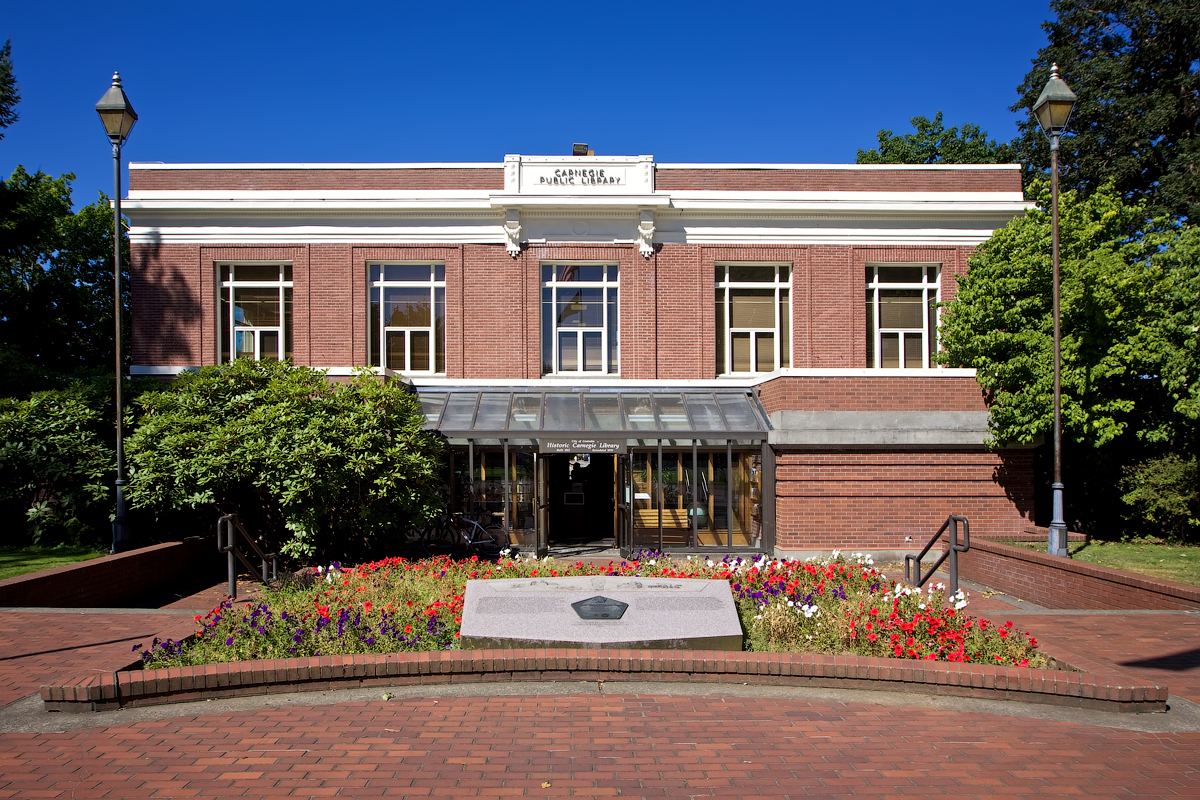
Centralia Timberland Library

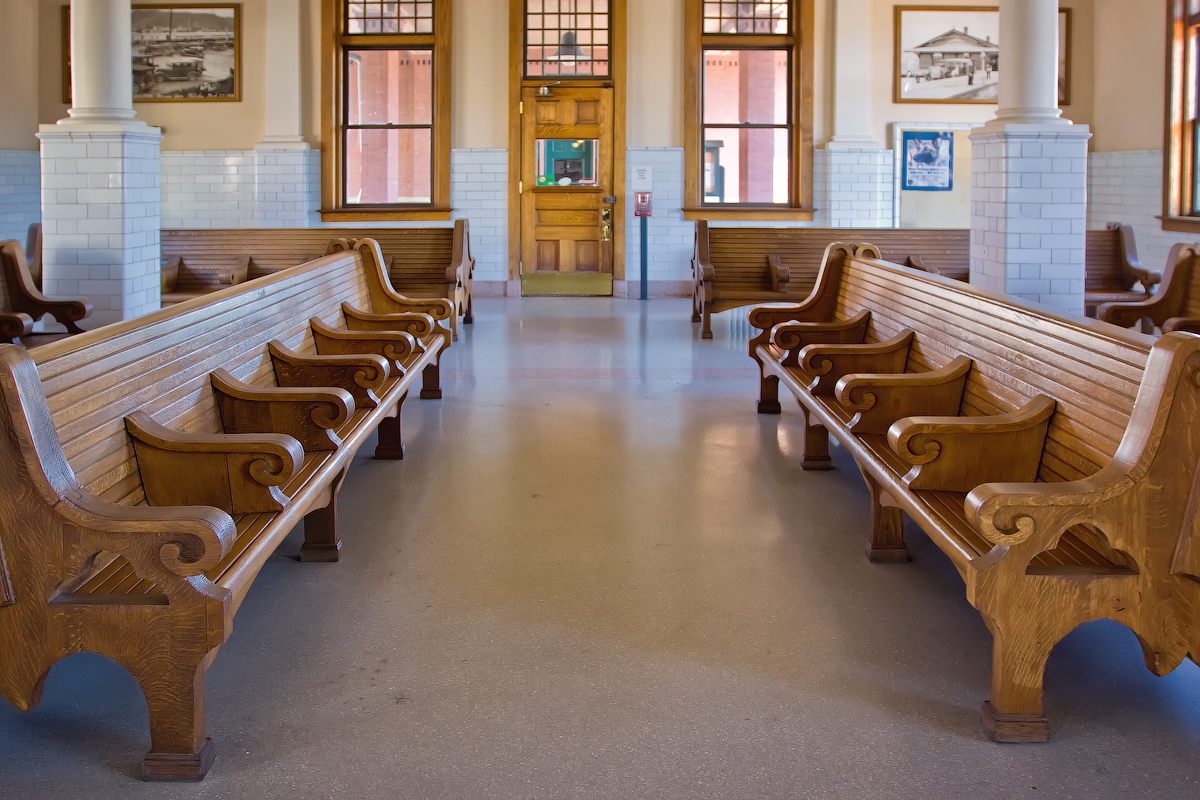
The interior of Centralia Union Depot

The Carnegie Library is located in Washington Park and was originally built in 1913 followed by a remodel in 1977–78. The library is now part of the Timberland Regional Library system.

Centralia Union Depot was built in 1912 and features red brick architecture, vintage oak benches, and internal and external woodworking throughout. The renovated depot, listed on the National Register of Historic Places, is currently served by Amtrak.

Located in Fort Borst Park are the Fort Borst blockhouse and the Borst Home. The blockhouse is a log structure that was built in 1856 and was used as grain storage during local wars with Native Americans. Originally constructed near the confluence of the Chehalis and Skookumchuck rivers, the building was moved twice, in 1915 due to an alteration of the Chehalis River's course, and then in 1922 to its present-day site in the park. Joseph Borst, an Oregon Trail migrant, purchased the blockhouse from the U.S. government in 1857 and his family would use the building as a residence until he built the Borst Home next to the structure in 1864. The house was constructed near a toll ferry crossing that existed at the time and the home site contains a replicated one-room schoolhouse and a church. The Borst Home, but not the blockhouse, is listed on the National Register of Historic Places (NRHP).

Centralia is host to various other NRHP sites including the George E. Birge House, the Hubbard Bungalow, and the Wesley Everest Gravesite. The NRHP-listed Centralia Downtown Historic District is home to McMenamin's Olympic Club Hotel & Theater a registered historic hotel and restaurant that opened in 1908.

Additional buildings of note include the one-room Salzer Valley Schoolhouse. Situated southeast of the city on a donated land claim from the Salzer family, it was built in 1894 and existed as school until 1944.

==== Movie theaters ====
The city was once home to the Twin City Drive-In, located immediately north of the Southwest Washington Fairgrounds. It began in 1933 as a single-screen outdoor theater, with a reopening in 1961 after a transfer of ownership. During the 1950s, the outdoor screens were known locally to show risque movies, such as Baby Doll and the nudist film, Garden of Eden. The drive-in had a train ride for children on the property; the ride was purchased by a local enthusiast and rebuilt for use at the 2015 fair. The premises installed a second screen but eventually the venue fell into disuse and the grounds left to decay. In 2002, a prior resident of Chehalis purchased the neon entrance sign to the drive-in with plans to display it as a highway memorial to graduates from the area; he would donate the sign later to an agriculture museum located in Centralia. Damages from windstorms decimated the screens and a fire in 2023, declared to be most likely arson, burned down the remaining building on the property, the ticket booth that also housed the projectors. As of 2023, the theater grounds are mostly bereft of any immediately visible remnants and are covered in brush.

=== Music ===
Seattle-based rock band Harvey Danger used Centralia as a metaphor in its song "Moral Centralia," found on the 2005 album Little by Little.

=== Public art ===
Murals are found throughout historic downtown Centralia. Examples include murals depicting the founder of Centralia (Centerville) named George Washington, Buffalo Bill and his Wild West Show and an abstract mural depicting the 1919 Armistice Day Centralia Massacre, also known as the Wobbly War.

Centralia is part of the ARTrails of Southwest Washington initiative. The cooperative, begun in 2003, showcases local artists, art studios and galleries throughout the region, and holds an annual autumnal studio tour that incorporates events in smaller towns within Lewis County. ARTrails opened a gallery for its members in the city in 2015 and the Centralia Train Depot is used as the nexus of the tour.

=== Theater ===
The city has been home to the Evergreen Playhouse since 1959. Beginning as a troupe performance at a ballroom of the local historic Lewis and Clark Building, it raised funds by selling $5 non-redeemable stock to patrons for its first production, Sabrina Fair. The organization eventually purchased its own theater in 1972 for $16,000. During the COVID-19 pandemic, the 130-seat playhouse underwent a renovation, including removing the original seating, but saved three of the original wood-backed chairs to be used in a display. As of 2023, the Evergreen Playhouse, a non-profit, volunteer-run theater, has achieved to operate without a financial loss during its entirety, and has remained at the same location near the downtown district on Center Street.

== Sports ==
Centralia once hosted a minor league baseball team in the early 20th century. The team moniker varied, going under the names of Midgets, Pets, and Railroaders. The ballclub won the 1911 Washington State League championship. Similar to the Chehalis teams, the Centralia team folded in 1912, and the city has not had an official minor league team since. The team played its home games at Riverside Park.

A bicycle event for local residents in the Twin Cities, known as the Centralia to Chehalis Bike Ride, was held continuously from the late 20th century into the 3rd millennium. The "C to C" route meandered from George Washington Park, to around the Chehalis–Centralia Airport, through residential neighborhoods, and finishing at the Recreation Park Complex in Chehalis.

== Parks and recreation ==
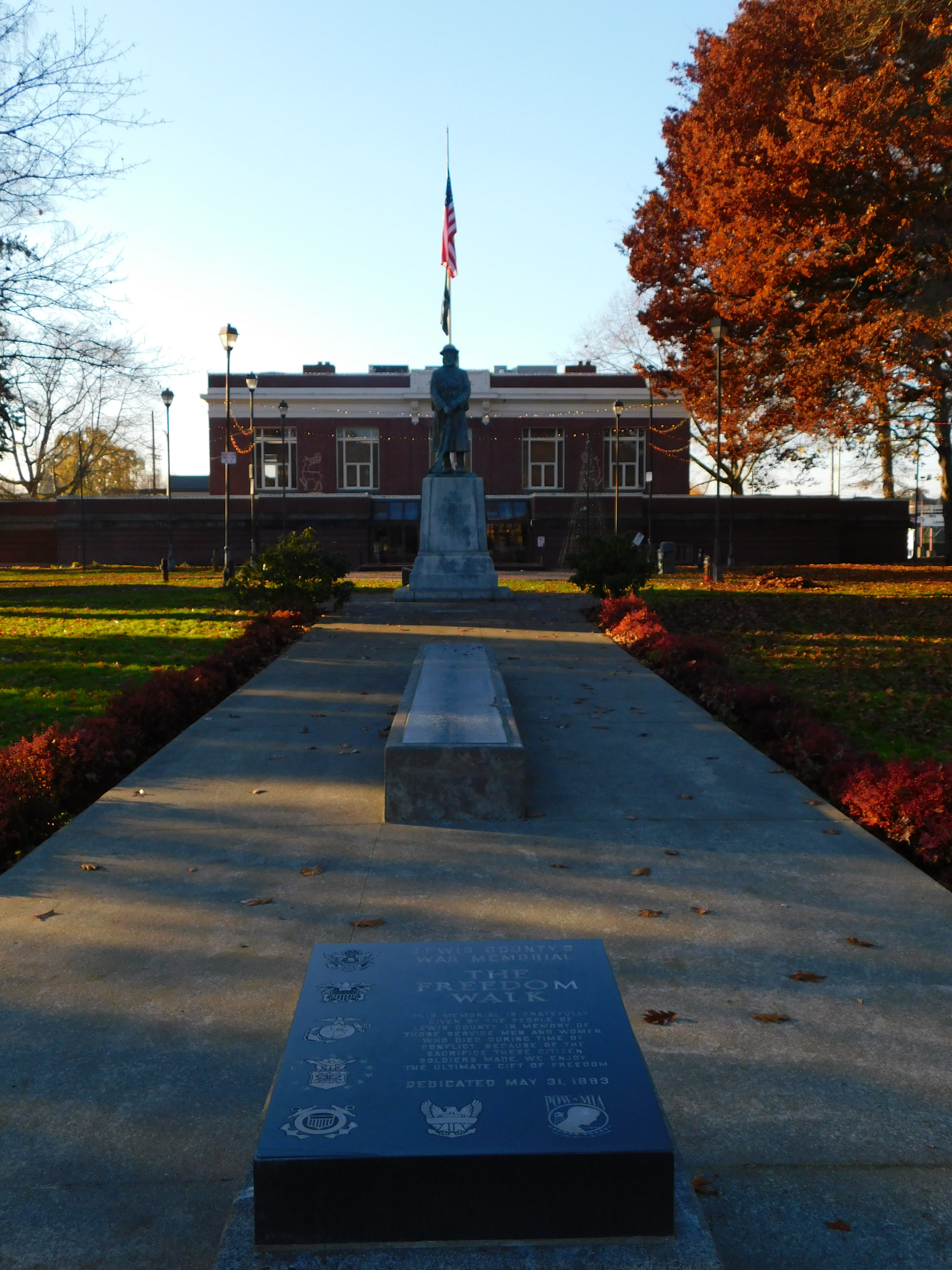
George Washington Park, 2023

The Centralia parks system is classified into distinct areas categorized as natural areas or open space corridors, neighborhood parks, or community parks. Recreational areas include sports related ballfields or water parks, and the city designates certain locations, such as buildings and other open spaces, as special facilities.

George Washington Park, in Centralia's downtown district, is home to the Centralia Timberland Library. The park contains the statue, The Sentinel, and the Freedom Walk War Memorial, both honoring Centralia soldiers who lost their lives during World War I. The statue is also a remembrance to the deaths of American Legion members that occurred during the city's 1919 Armistice Day Riot. It was placed in 1924 and is listed on the National Register of Historic Places. A bronze plaque honoring the deaths of members of the IWW "Wobblies" during the Centralia Tragedy was installed next to the statue in 2023. The Freedom Walk was built in 1993 and presents the individual names of veterans who perished in military combat since the First World War.

A preserve encompassing over 70 acres (28 ha), known as the Seminary Hill Natural Area, was once the home of a seminary. The grounds contains over two miles of trails.

Along the Skookumchuck River, near Hayes Lake in the shopping district, lies the 4.5-acre (1.8 ha) Riverside Park. The land, originally developed by a local rotary club, was donated to the city in 1983. The park contains a 44,000 square feet (4,087.73 m^{2}) skate park and a covered playground. The Fort Borst blockhouse was temporarily relocated to the site in the late 1910s.

A sports complex known as Bob Peters Field is situated at the Centralia College campus. Named after a long-serving athletic director at the school, the 4.0-acre (1.6 ha) site hosts fields for baseball, softball, and soccer. It was completed in 2023 and was built, in part, by using over $3 million of student fees.

A community pool, known as the Veteran's Memorial Pearl Street Pool, was built in the 1950s in Centralia's downtown district, it once contained a bathhouse. The city owned and oversaw operations of the facility until the 1980s when it was transferred to a local nonprofit. Centralia would regain possession of the pool in 2008 but closed it in 2011 due to a combination of expensive repairs and maintenance, lack of funds, and a decrease in staffing. Since its 2011 cessation, various city and community groups have made improvements to the recreation parcel by adding a playground and spray park. Unable to cover approximately $5 million renovation and rebuild costs, the city council, in 2023, decided to permanently cease operations at the pool. The city would fill the pool with dirt, for liability and injury concerns, months later. A second community pool, known as the Centralia Community Pool, was created by a bond passed in the 1970s and is run under a joint contract between the city, the school district, and a local fitness company. Open to all residents, children and school activities are given priority at the facility.

=== Fort Borst Park ===
Centralia's largest park is Fort Borst Park located at the junction of the Chehalis and Skookumchuck rivers. The 101.0-acre (40.9 ha) park provides 2.1 miles (3.4 km) of paved trails in a forested setting. The site includes a dog park and a large picnic area. Visitors can fish from the river banks or access the waters via a boat launch, or at the park's Borst Lake, which is stocked with rainbow trout.

The park contains the original Borst Home, a reproduced schoolhouse, and a replicated pioneer church from the 1860s that was completed in 2021. Surrounding the homestead is the Borst Park Arboretum, created in 1960. The arboretum contains the Borst family cemetery, almost 200 trees and a large number of rhododendrons. The park hosts an annual Christmas-themed "Fort Borst Park Drive-Through Lights" that includes a food drive and also raises funds for the park department.

Located within Fort Borst Park is Centralia's NW Sports Hub. Officially opened in 2014, the 76,500-square-foot (7,110 m^{2}) complex is owned by a various group of Centralia government bodies and businesses. The hub contains enclosed buildings that house numerous volleyball and basketball courts and fields for indoor baseball and soccer. An attached outdoor component encompasses a mixture of previously built Little League and adult baseball fields, tennis courts, additional soccer fields, and the Centralia High School track stadium that can seat 3,500 people. In 2023, the outdoor fields received new lighting and turf, with special attention to Wheeler Field, based on funds from the American Rescue Plan Act of 2021. The use of the complex is given first priority to the community over events held by private entities but the sports compound hosts various tournaments for high school sports, competitions for the Greater Seattle League, and planned college scouting events for local athletes.

== Government and politics ==
Presidential Elections Results (Note: The Presidential Election Results table includes voting precincts within the Centralia city limits and may not include other nearby or surrounding districts such as Salzer or Seminary Hill.)
Year	Republican	Democratic	Third parties
2008	51.3% 3034	46.6% 2758	2.2% 128
2012	51.5% 3032	45.5% 2676	3.0% 174
2016	54.7% 3198	36.7% 2145	8.7% 506
2020	53.1% 4243	43.0% 3434	3.9% 315
2024	51.0% 3856	44.7% 3380	4.4% 331

=== Government ===
Centralia is a non-charter code city with a council–manager form of government. The City Council consists of seven members with positions one through three being at-large positions.

=== Politics ===
The 2020 election included 204 votes for Jo Jorgensen of the Libertarian Party and 43 for write-in candidates. In the 2024 election, there were 35 votes cast for write-in candidates and 175 votes were tallied for Robert F. Kennedy Jr..

== Education ==
Students and their education are overseen by the Centralia School District.

=== Centralia College ===
Centralia College is the oldest continuously operating junior college in the state of Washington, and was founded on September 14, 1925.

Centralia College panorama

== Media ==
=== Newspaper ===
Centralia's leading newspaper is The Chronicle, ranked seventeenth in the state based on weekday circulation, and serves most of Lewis County. There are also several community-based newspapers that are published bi-weekly, such as The Lewis County News and The East County Journal.

=== Radio ===
The Centralia area is served by two AM radio stations, KELA - 1470 AM and KITI - 1420 AM. The FM station, KCED - 91.3 FM operates from within the city. Radio broadcasts are accessible from nearby Chehalis stations KMNT - 104.3 FM and KACS - 90.5 FM. Centralia is able to pick up Winlock station KITI-FM - 95.1 FM as well as the transmission of KZTM - 102.9 FM from Olympia.

== Infrastructure ==
=== Transportation ===
==== Air ====
Centralia is served by the Chehalis–Centralia Airport. The city, beginning in 1961, was once a co-owner of the airfield but withdrew from the joint operating agreement in 2004 due to concerns over contract violations, liability, and cost-benefits. Centralia was once home to the Centralia Municipal Air Field located near Fort Borst Park. Opened in August 1927 to 10,000 spectators and an aerial performance, the airport quietly folded by the mid-1930s reportedly due to hardships caused by the Great Depression.

==== Railroads ====
Amtrak, the national passenger rail system, provides service to Centralia station, stopping at the town's renovated 1912 railroad depot. Amtrak train 11, the southbound Coast Starlight, is scheduled to depart Centralia at 11:45am with service to Kelso-Longview, Portland, Sacramento, Emeryville, California (with bus connection to San Francisco), and Los Angeles. Amtrak train 14, the northbound Coast Starlight, is scheduled to depart Centralia at 5:57pm daily with service to Olympia-Lacey, Tacoma and Seattle. Amtrak Cascades trains, operating as far north as Vancouver, British Columbia and as far south as Eugene, Oregon, serve Centralia several times daily in both directions. BNSF trains in Centralia's downtown rail yard and on the mainline serve local and regional shippers, but can affect the timeliness of Amtrak service and are a noisy reminder of the days of the town's heyday as the crossroads of four major railroads (Union Pacific, Milwaukee Road, Great Northern and Northern Pacific).

==== Public transportation ====
Bus service is provided by Lewis County Transit. Routes originating in Centralia serve Olympia, Chehalis, Castle Rock, and Kelso, among other locations.

==== Automotive ====
Centralia is situated alongside Interstate 5, and it is located almost exactly halfway between Portland and Seattle on this highway. Its primary exit is at mile marker 82, with mile 0 being the Portland city limits and mile 164 being near Downtown Seattle. U.S. Route 12 passes through Centralia while it is concurrent with I-5. Washington State Route 507 originates in Centralia, terminating in Pierce County via Tenino and Yelm.

=== Utilities ===
==== Communications ====
The first telephone operations in Centralia began in 1891 when the city was connected to the Sunset Telephone and Telegraph Company (STTC) located on Tower Avenue. The first customer was a neighboring pair of attorneys. The STTC recorded 23 subscribers the following year, falling to only six in 1893, but began to slowly rebound at the turn of the century. By 1910, over 500 customers subscribed to the line, serving approximately 1,000 customers in the Twin Cities when the STTC was renamed in 1916 as the Pacific Telephone and Telegraph Company . By the mid-1960s, the area was served by Pacific Northwest Bell and had a subscriber list of over 12,000 between Centralia and Chehalis.

==== Water ====
As of 2023, Centralia Public Works was granted $85,000 to fund searches for lead pipes in the city, the only water utility in Washington state to accept monies from a $63 million federal bill passed in 2021 meant to help find and replace lead piping. In 2018, the city investigated the use of lead pipes in the municipal water system, specifically for homes built from the 1920s through the 1940s. The city has found only five pigtail connections made of lead since the late 1970s.

Centralia built a wastewater treatment facility beginning in 2001 that is located on 300 acres (120 ha) in the Ford's Prairie neighborhood near the Discovery Trail. Begun from a Washington Department of Ecology loan that eventually cost almost $27 million, the facility replaced an at-capacity treatment plant built in 1951 near Mellen Street. As of 2024, the facility processes up to 10,500,000 US gallons (40,000,000 L; 8,700,000 imp gal) of wastewater per day.

== Notable people ==
- Charlie Albright, pianist
- Calvin Armstrong, American football player
- Ann Boleyn, singer
- Bob Coluccio, baseball player
- Merce Cunningham, modern dancer
- Darcy Fast, pastor and former Major League Baseball player
- Noah Gundersen, singer
- Sandy Marth Hill, American television journalist
- Soren Johnson, video game designer
- James Kelsey, sculptor
- Craig McCaw, entrepreneur
- Angela Meade, operatic soprano
- C. D. Moore, U.S. Air Force general
- Patricia Anne Morton, first woman to serve as a Diplomatic Security special agent
- Lyle Overbay, former Major League Baseball player
- Brock Peterson, former Major League Baseball player
- Tavita Pritchard, American football coach
- Ford Rainey, actor
- Jimmy Ritchey, country music songwriter and record producer
- Detlef Schrempf, NBA player
- Elmer Smith, lawyer connected to the Centralia Tragedy
- Robbie Turner, drag queen
- Skyler Wheeler, Iowa state representative

== See also ==
- Chehalis River Basin Flood Authority
