= St. Helens Hotel =

NRHP-listed site in Chehalis, Washington

- U.S. National Register of Historic Places
- Washington State Heritage Register
- Chehalis Historic Preservation Commission
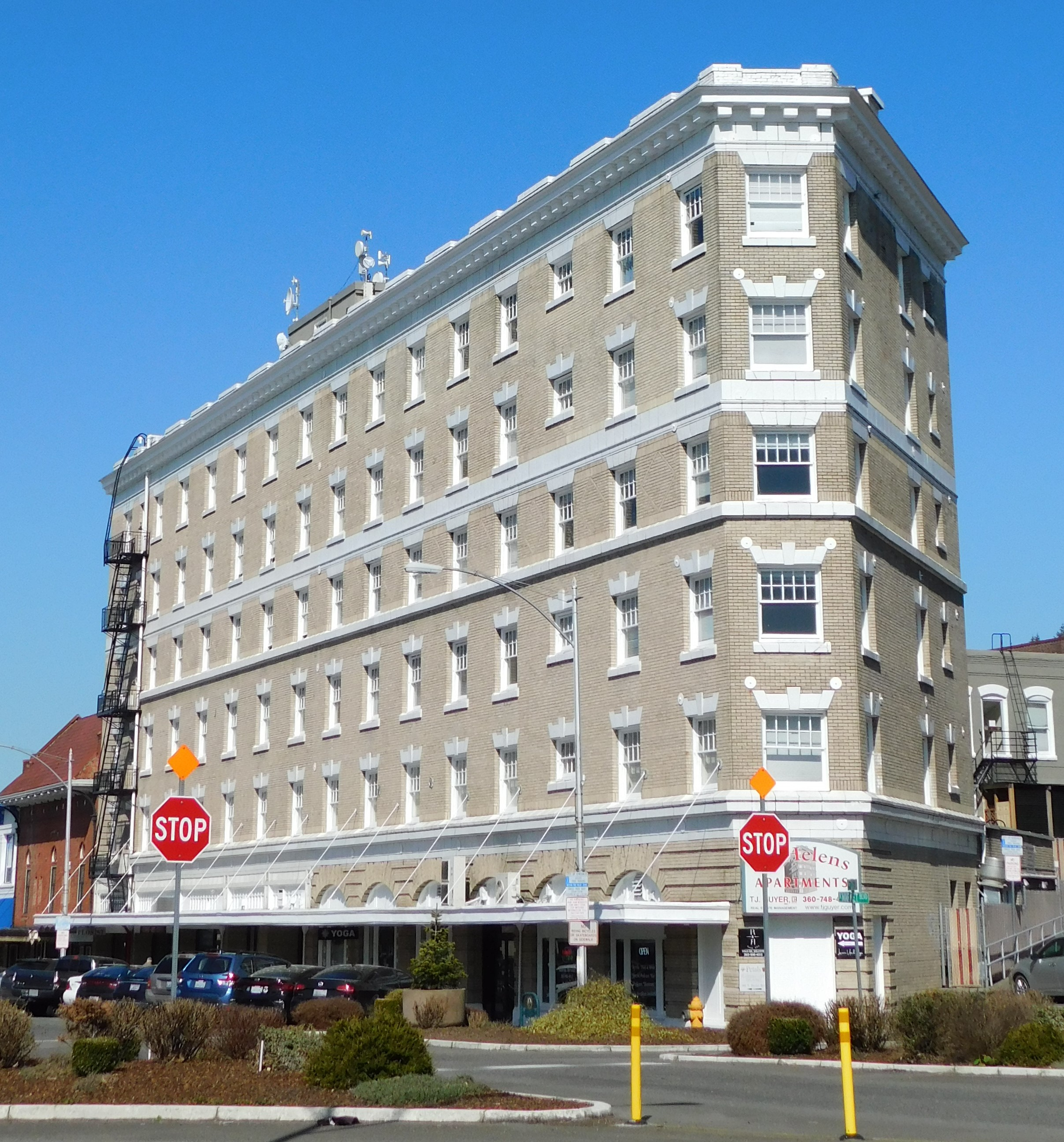
- St. Helens Hotel, 2023

- Location within Washington (state)
- Location: 440 N. Market Blvd., Chehalis, Washington
- Coordinates: 46°39′52″N 122°58′06″W
- Area: less than one acre
- Built: 1917
- Built by: William F. West
- Architect: Charles E. Troutman
- Architectural style: Classical Revival
- Restored: 1976, 2003, 2005
- MPS: Chehalis MPS
- NRHP reference No.: 91001497

Significant dates
- Added to NRHP: October 8, 1991
- Designated WSHR: August 13, 1987

The St. Helens Hotel, also known as the St. Helens Inn, is located in Chehalis, Washington and has been registered on the National Register of Historic Places (NRHP) since 1991. The historic hotel is situated on the south end of the Chehalis Downtown Historic District, an NRHP-listed district.

The first St. Helens Hotel was a wooden inn built in the late 19th century and owned by William West, a prominent Chehalis pioneer. Due to a growing, modern city and an increase in travelers through the region, the hotel was rebuilt of brick and expanded between 1917 and 1921. The West family continued full or partial ownership of the hotel since its inception until 1976, when the St. Helens underwent a full conversion as an apartment house.

Named after Mt. St. Helens, the hotel was a center for civic activity in the city during its peak and hosted numerous events and guests during its run as a hotel. The St. Helens is the tallest building in Chehalis and is the core marker of the downtown district.

== History ==
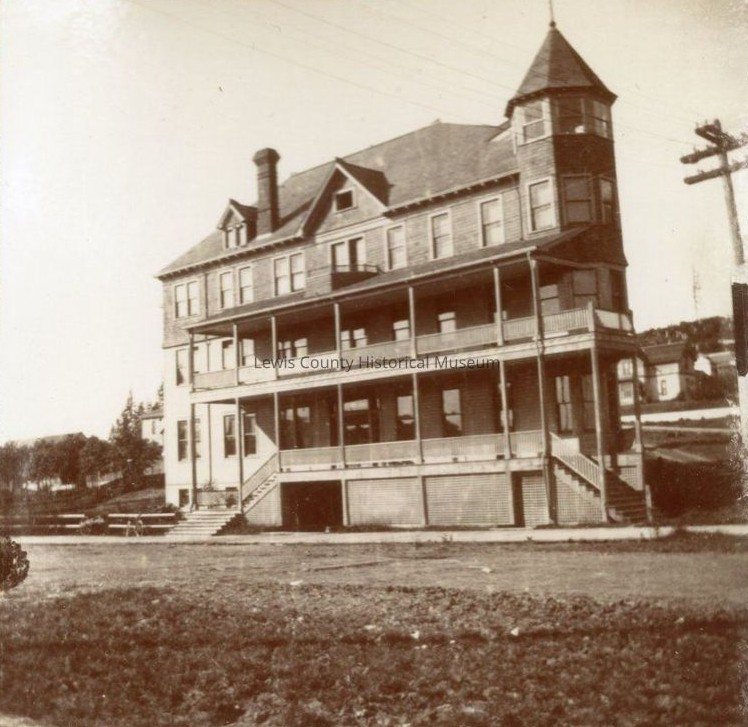
St. Helens Hotel, 1890

The first St. Helens Hotel, named after Mt. St. Helens, a landmark for the city located approximately 50 miles (80 km) to the southeast, was a three-story wood building located in the new downtown district of Chehalis. It was constructed between 1890 and 1894 by the Chehalis Land & Timber Company (CL&T) and an investment group noted for the construction boom of the Market Street downtown area, the Chehalis Improvement Company. The first portion of the hotel to be built was its turret. A bar, known as the St. Helens Tavern, opened at the site in 1891 and the hotel opened for business on May 12, 1891 (Note: Various reports in decades after the inaugural 1891 celebration often refer to 1894 as the official opening of the hotel, possibly using the year to denote the end of construction of the old wooden inn. See sources within the article.) after a grand ball and banquet. The downtown district was decorated with lights and over 1,000 invitations were sent to prominent people in the state. Another opening was held on May 1, 1894, at the completion of the hotel. The extravagance of the ceremonies was such that waiters and staff were hired from Chicago.

One of the purposes of the hotel was to entice an intentional shift of the commercial and downtown core to Market Boulevard. Also known as Market Street, the thoroughfare was a dirt road in the city's early beginnings, becoming a plank road after 1906. By as early as 1912, the street was paved with brick. Market Street, beginning at the hotel, was converted into a northbound one-way thoroughfare in 1960.

An addition was added in 1904 and with an increase in travelers to the city, a brick annex was constructed and completed in 1910. The $20,000 annex was connected by a hallway to the wooden inn and contained a larger basement and store front, with an added veranda on Market Street. A total of 26 rooms, decorated in Flemish green, were built and six were private, family-oriented suites. Modern amenities of the time, including private bathrooms, hot and cold water, steam heat, and telephones, were installed. The first fire escape was installed in 1909. Further remodeling was completed in 1914 and by the next year, the hotel listed 70 rooms.

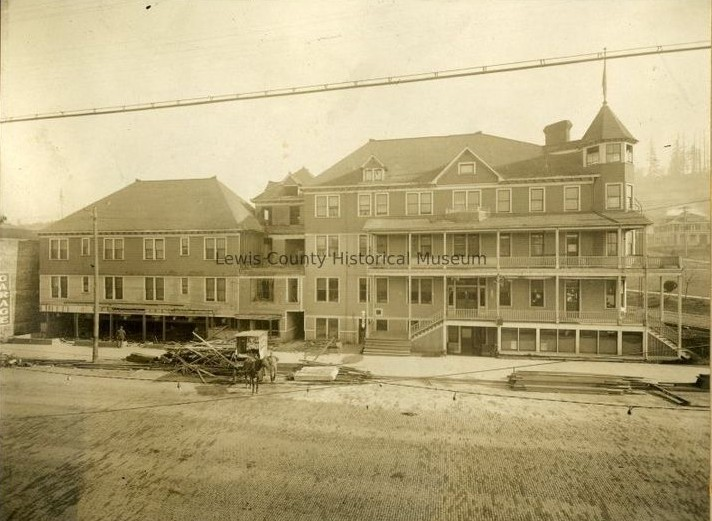
St. Helens Hotel, 1892

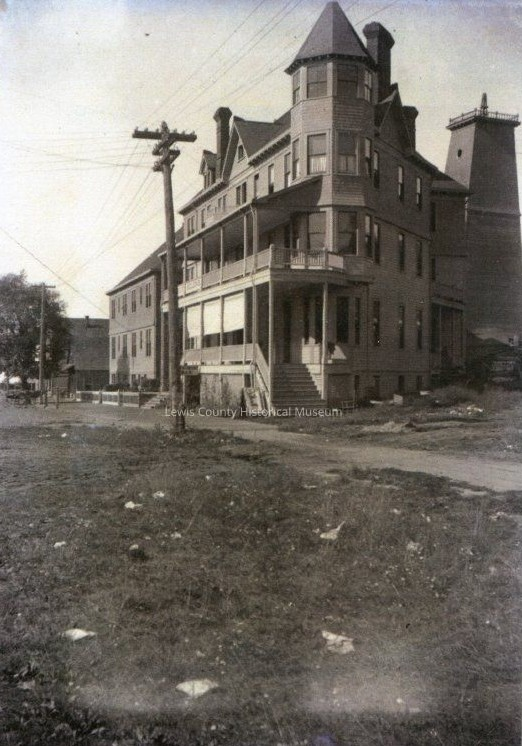
St. Helens Hotel, ca. 1890s

By the mid-1910s, it was determined by St. Helens ownership and other businessmen in Chehalis that it was necessary to replace the wooden inn with a brick version due to a variety of factors, including the growth of the downtown area with its newer, more modern buildings, the build of the Burlington Northern Depot, and heavier use of the automobile on the Pacific Highway (eventually known as Highway 99) that traveled past the hotel. The original structure was sold and moved in mid-1917, minus the front porch and tower, three blocks to the north on Washington Avenue. It became the Sticklin Apartments, named after Louis J. Sticklin, a noted undertaker in the Twin Cities who purchased and converted the old inn. The apartment building was condemned after suffering a large fire in 1978; it was ultimately razed in 1982.

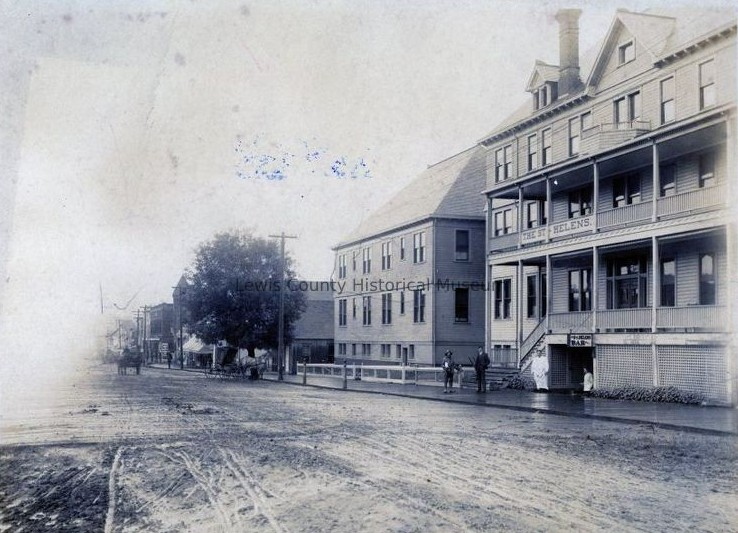
St. Helens Hotel, 1906

The St. Helens Hotel was constructed in several phases by one of the architects of the Lumber Exchange Building in South Bend, Washington, Charles E. Troutman, (Note: In reporting of the history of the St. Helens Hotel, it is common for Jacque "Jack" DeForest Griffin to be named as the architect. This confusion arises from Griffin designing the next door St. Helens Theater.) and owner, William F. West, namesake of W.F. West High School. Announcements and initial details, beginning with the first phase known as the "annex", were released throughout 1916. Initial plans included an elevator and mezzanine. The build was of such expectation that the Twin City Automobile Company signed a lease for showroom space on the bottom floor before construction began. The work on the annex began in early 1917 and the hotel was fully complete by 1921. The annex, a four-story structure located behind the hotel, was constructed before the original wooden inn was removed. The second stage involved the building of the four-story front section of the hotel. Estimated to cost $35,000, it was begun by the spring of 1918 and finished later that year, containing 100 rooms. By June 1919, West realized that the hotel needed another expansion due to continuing demand for accommodations, announcing the build of two additional floors which were to include sleeping porches and 35 additional rooms; construction began in April 1920. The final facet of the St. Helens expansion was completed in 1920, adding two stories and increasing the room total to 150.

The new St. Helens Hotel opened on January 3, 1919, with a banquet sponsored by the Chehalis Citizen's Club. Another banquet was held on the premises that day to celebrate the formation of a Lewis County congress to address construction needs and concerns. When the hotel was fully completed, an official opening was held on May 12, 1921. (Note: Differing accounts list the opening date as May 1, 1924.) The hotel's ground floor was home to the St. Helens Coffee Shop and by 1924, was neighbor to the St. Helens Theater to the north. For a time, the radio station KITI-FM broadcast out of the St. Helens.

In 1975, ownership received permission to fully convert the hotel to apartments. Ongoing financial issues, along with severe building code violations, the hotel closed for a brief time in January 1976. A change in owners occurred a few months later and the site officially began to be reconstructed for use as an apartment complex. The conversion was undertaken in 1977 and the hotel was renamed as the St. Helens Inn, holding a grand opening on October 1, 1977.

Also known as the St. Helens Apartments or the Chateau St. Helens, the building's appeal began to wane after a lack of care and upgrades, reaching a low of 11 tenants by 2003. New owners that year led to a tenancy rebound by 2005, with apartment vacancies listed as only five or six. After another sale of the hotel in 2005, a years-long effort to upgrade the site was begun. At the time, the downtown district around the St. Helens was considered a "bad part of town" and the new owner evicted troublesome renters and authorized stricter tenant application requirements and conduct rules for tenants. The site was renamed by the new owners from Chateau St. Helens to the St. Helens Inn, the moniker originally used under the NRHP nomination.

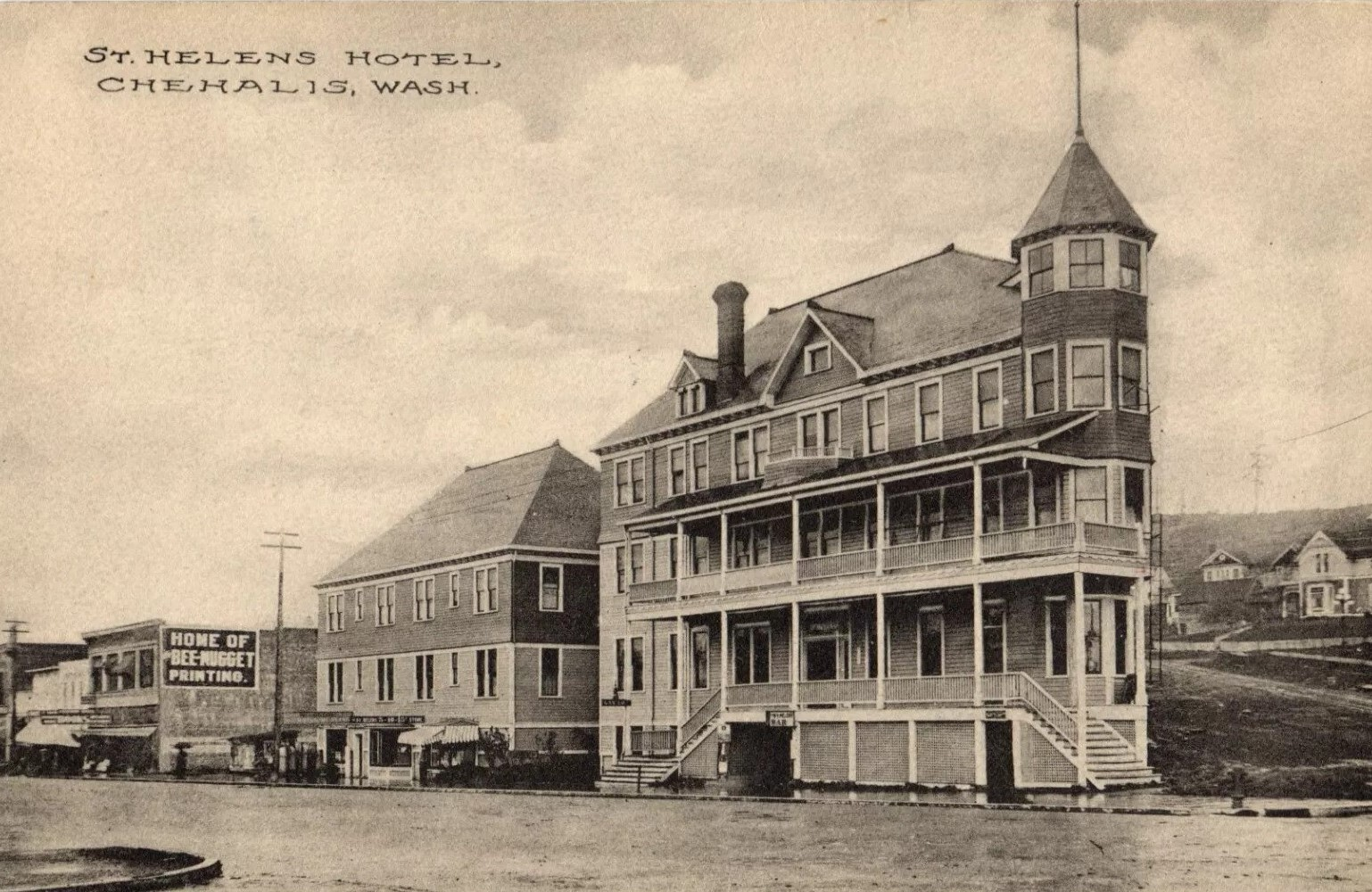
St. Helens Hotel, 1904-1910

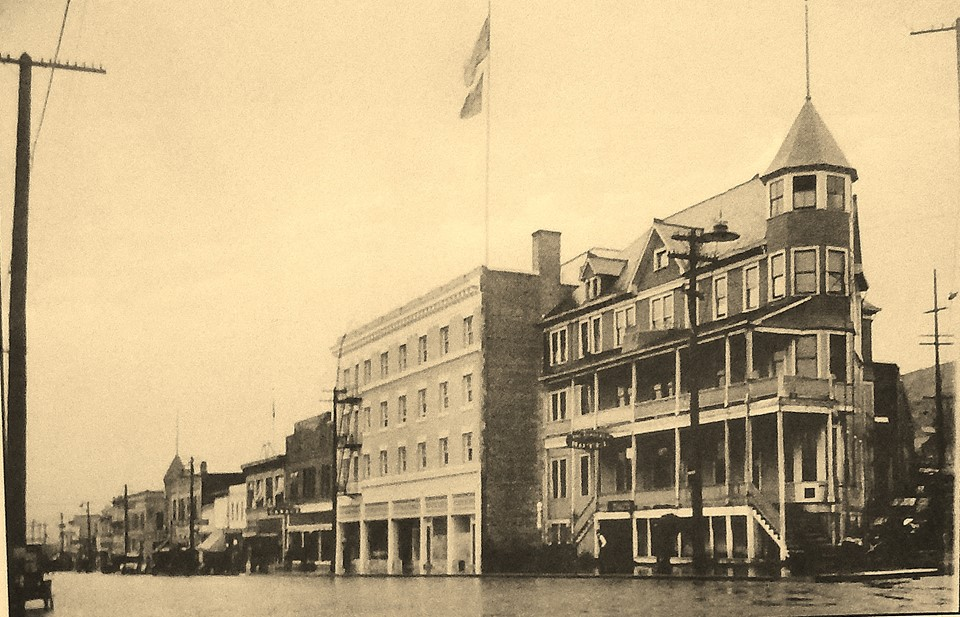
St. Helens Hotel, ca. 1917

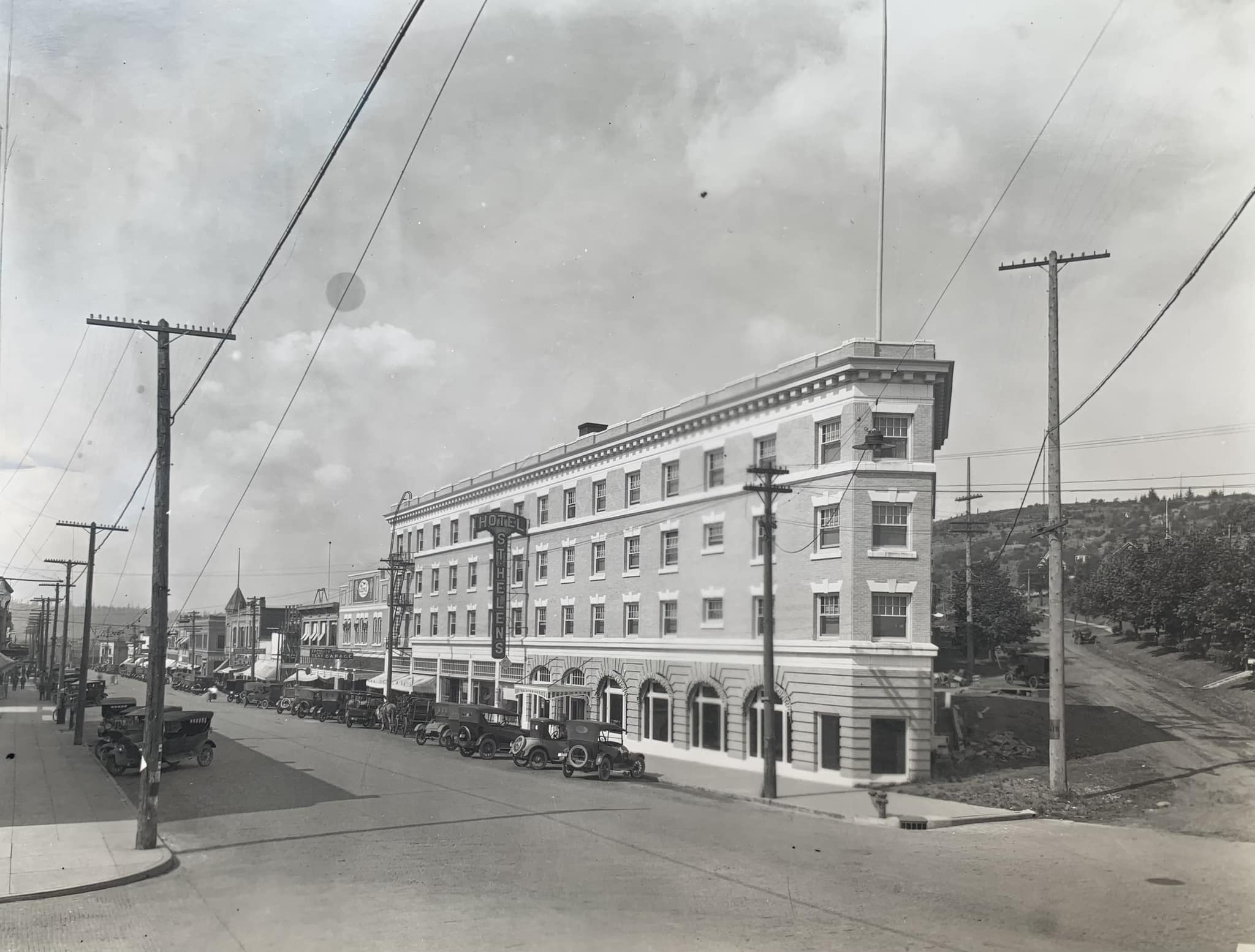
St. Helens Hotel, post 1917 build

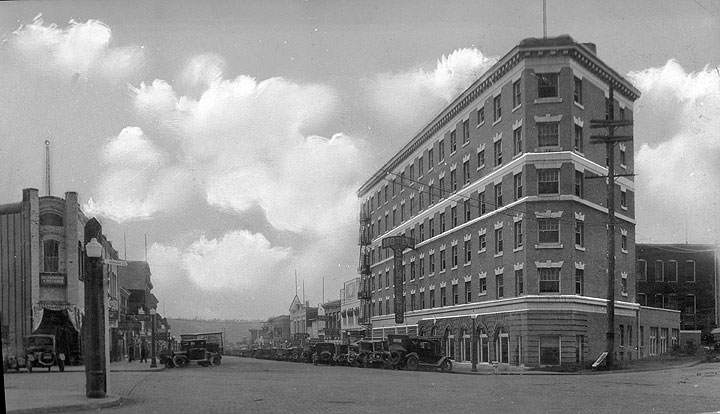
St. Helens Hotel, after completion, ca. 1921

=== Ownership and management ===
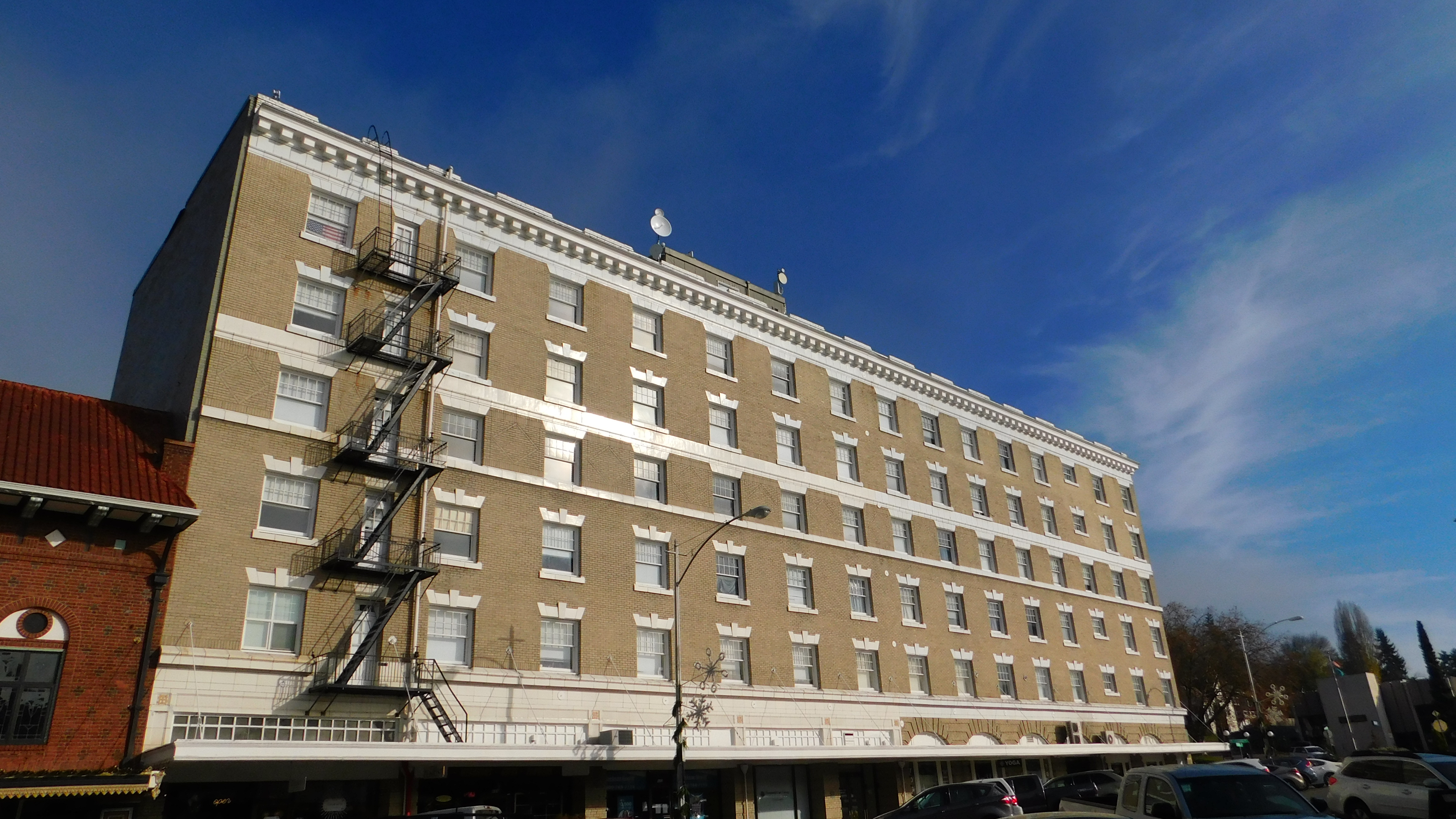
St. Helens Hotel, 2023

From the St. Helen's beginnings as a wooden building in the 1890s up until the 1970s apartment conversion, the hotel's ownership remained either fully or partially under the West family of Chehalis. William West, a respected civil servant and businessman, served as the owner from the beginning under management with his brother-in-law, John Dobson. Additional owners at the time included state senator and city mayor, Francis Donahoe. Full ownership and oversight was transferred to West's son, William Francis (W.F) on February 28, 1904, due in part to a significant loan from Dobson. (Note: The NRHP report lists John Dobson's last name as Abbe. There is also a large discrepancy in ownership transfer to W.F. West, possibly as late as 1915, according to the NRHP form. See sources listed.) In 1912, the hotel was under the new management of H.A. Kaufman who had rights to purchase the hotel outright by the end of that year. The sale did not materialize and under W.F. West's management, the hotel was converted into the brick St. Helens Hotel recognized by the NRHP. West retained a controlling stake after retiring in 1948, and he leased the building that year to a former bellhop at the hotel, Louis Pemerl, who oversaw the management of the facilities. West died on September 20, 1963, and the St. Helens was placed under the oversight of the William F. West Foundation, a scholarship program, until 1976.

Pemerl retired in 1973 and sold his ownership stake to John and Joy Bellour that year; John was a retired Seattle businessman and hotelier. Bellour's ownership lasted until early 1976, bought out for approximately $275,000 via bankruptcy proceedings in April by Lewis County Savings and Loan. The purchase officially ended the West's family ownership of the hotel. The savings and loan, under the Lewis Service Corporation, sold the hotel in 1984 to a Los Angeles-based partnership that included a Chehalis family, selling the inn four years later in 1988 to Ernie Pruett and Dee Reynolds, who reopened the hotel that March. The site was sold once again to Francelene Davidian before coming under ownership to Don Portnoy who purchased the historic inn for $950,000 in 1995. Partnering with his brother in 2000, the brothers owned the property until October 2003 when they sold the historic hotel to the Huntington brothers for approximately $667,000. Up until the sale, the hotel was in the process of foreclosure and was possibly slated to be put up for auction. Two years later in March 2005, the hotel was sold again. At a sale price of $1.4 million, the inn was purchased by Daylight Development, a Bellingham-based company.

=== Accidents and incidents ===
In 1894, manager Charles C. Kramer was fired from the St. Helens Hotel under suspicion of forging checks and drug addiction. He killed himself soon afterwards.

In 1895, an inebriated Chehalis judge, W.W. Langhorne, threatened murder at the hotel. Langhorne, who brandished a pistol, stated he would "fill Edward K. Hunter with lead". The matter led to additional investigations of the judge, showing a record of abuses of his power and office.

In November 1900, a cook from Portland, recently hired and found not to be up to the task, pulled a revolver on the hotel manager and demanded enough money to pay for his return trip to Portland. The manager brushed the gun away and had the employee arrested under the intent to commit bodily harm. A masked man shot a St. Helens night watchman during a robbery of silverware in March 1902. The guard, armed with a revolver and not seriously injured, wounded the robber in return but the assailant left the premises and was not caught. During June 1908, a suspected arsonist attempted to burn the St. Helens. The attempt was one of several fires that spanned between the Twin Cities that month.

The hotel, along with the W.F. West High School, was part of a bomb threat in May 1972; no explosive was found and a member of the United States Navy who was on leave was suspected and charged.

Several fires occurred at the hotel. At the end of April 1907, a small blaze, which attracted a small crowd, started on the roof above the kitchen and was doused by the owner William West Sr.; damage was considered minimal. A grease fire from the hotel's kitchen spread to the second floor in October 1973. Suppressed in under an hour, damages were confined to several rooms and bathrooms in the annex. Losses were estimated as high as $50,000. Two fires involving the hotel's laundry room occurred in late February 1975, spreading to the second floor. Smoke reached the top floors but firefighters had the flames out within minutes; damages were confined to the laundry area and a meeting room.

== Geography ==
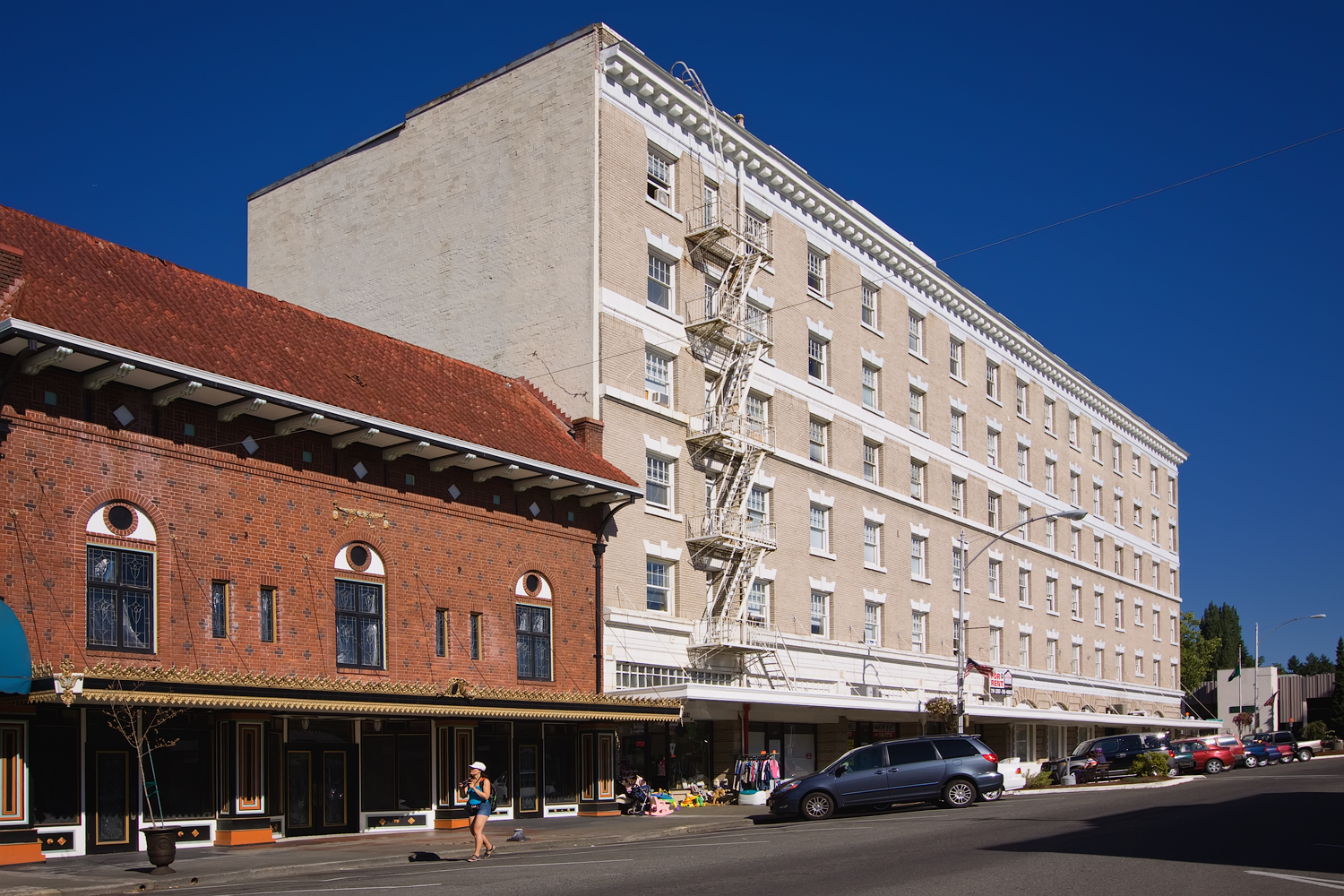
St. Helens Theater

The hotel is located at the south end of the Chehalis Downtown Historic District at a triangular junction of Cascade Avenue, Market Boulevard, and Park Street.

A recreation spot known as East Side Park was situated on a triangular area uphill of the St. Helens Hotel and was first begun in 1905. Issues with the grade and road improvements would plague the completion of the park and it was never completed; the land was offered in mid-1908 as the location of the Chehalis Carnegie library, which was completed and opened in 1910. The Vernetta Smith Timberland Library, which opened in 2008 and replaced the Carnegie building, is located on the same wedge-shaped grounds across from the hotel.

== Architecture and features ==
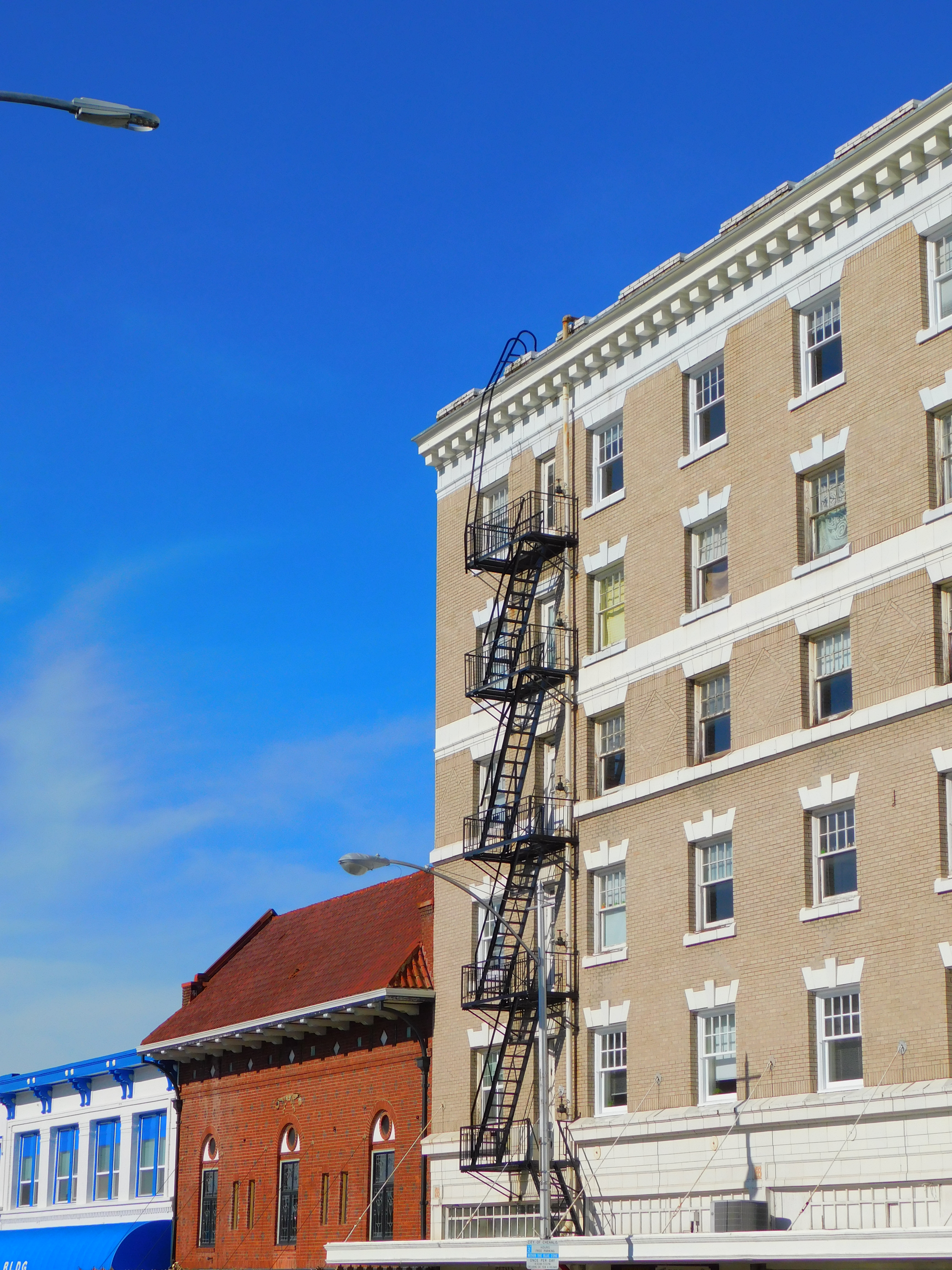
Fire escape, St. Helens Hotel

Unless otherwise noted, the details provided are based on the 1991 National Register of Historic Places (NRHP) nomination form and may not reflect updates or changes to the St. Helens Hotel in the interim.

The St. Helens Hotel is listed as six-stories tall and built of brick. The style of the structure and the attached annex are considered as simplified Neoclassical architecture. The hotel is the tallest building in Chehalis and the exterior has remained largely unaltered. The interior has undergone several renovations, including the 1970s remodel to convert the hotel into an apartment building.

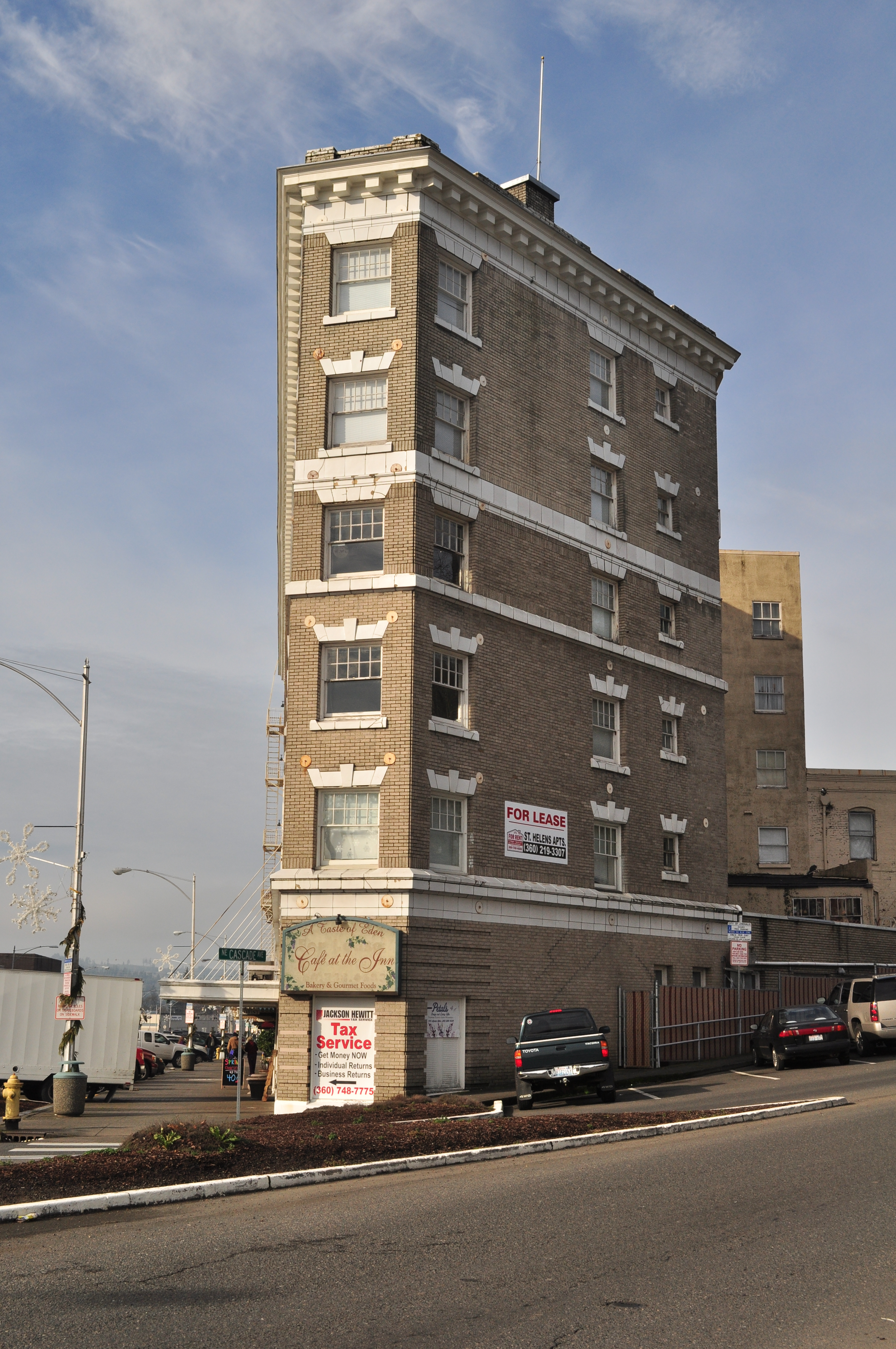
Corner view, 2015

The hotel footprint is of irregular shape, mostly triangular due to the wedge-shaped nature of the grounds. The roof of the structure is flat and the façade is built of gray brick, with details such as cornices and dentils. The ground floor contains round-arched windows while the upper sections contain ten-over-one double-hung sash casements. The annex windows are rectangular with transoms and the lintels and window sills are cream-colored. Molding that separated the third and fourth floors during the second phase of the construction was continued further up the façade when the final, top two floors were completed. The ornamentation, specifically noticed in the cornices and brick, does not wrap around the building, marking an obvious back side of the hotel on Cascade Avenue.

The hotel was built with a standard layout and usage of the age, with the ground floor used for commercial and retail businesses, while the upper floors were used for hotel accommodations. At its peak, the St. Helens provided 152 rooms. After the conversion of the hotel to apartments, the ground floor's purpose remained the same but the living quarters were rebuilt for kitchen-apartment use. A small lobby is used for tenants to access their living spaces and there were 52 total apartments recorded at the time of the NRHP nomination; fifty-five apartments were listed by 2003.

The 1917 four-story annex, when built, measured 90 feet (27.4 m) long and contained 40 rooms, most with a private bath and outside views. The ground floor contained 4 retail spaces and the exterior was pressed gray brick with terra cotta trim.

During a 2005 remodel, an original mosaic tile floor was found under carpeting in the lobby and front entrance. Window frames, existing from the hotel's build, were found to contain sawmill stamps, with labeling such as "Ship to W.F. West".

=== Extinct features ===
The large, painted sign which had adorned the side of the hotel for decades, signifying its name and importance, was no longer in place at the time of the NRHP nomination. The original entryway into the hotel was removed during the remodeling of the building into apartments.

Beginning in the 1920s, a soda shop and cigar store were opened on the ground floor retail space. The fountain shop was begun under Bill Smith who sold it in 1936 and it became known as The Saunder's Fountain. The Lowery family purchased the store in 1967, giving it the moniker, D and B Fountain and Tavern.

A billiard room was noted by 1900 and the interior featured a "grill room" in the 1920s. The hotel contained several meeting and lounge rooms, such as the Terrace Room.

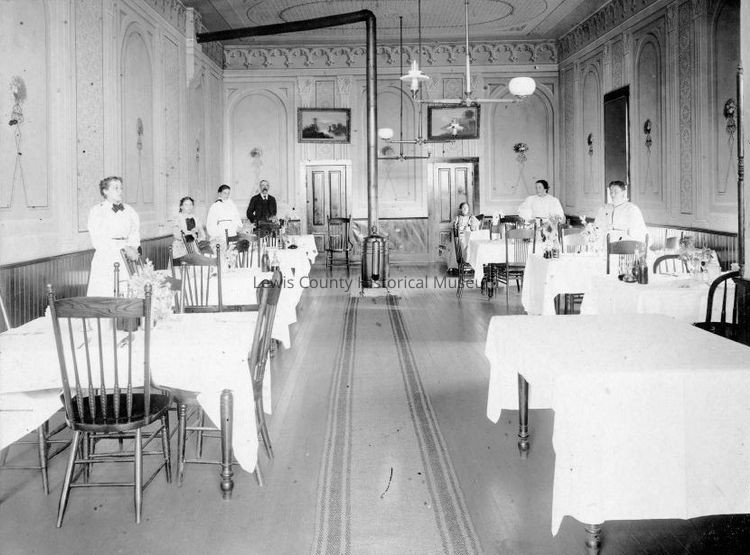
Dining room, ca. 1895

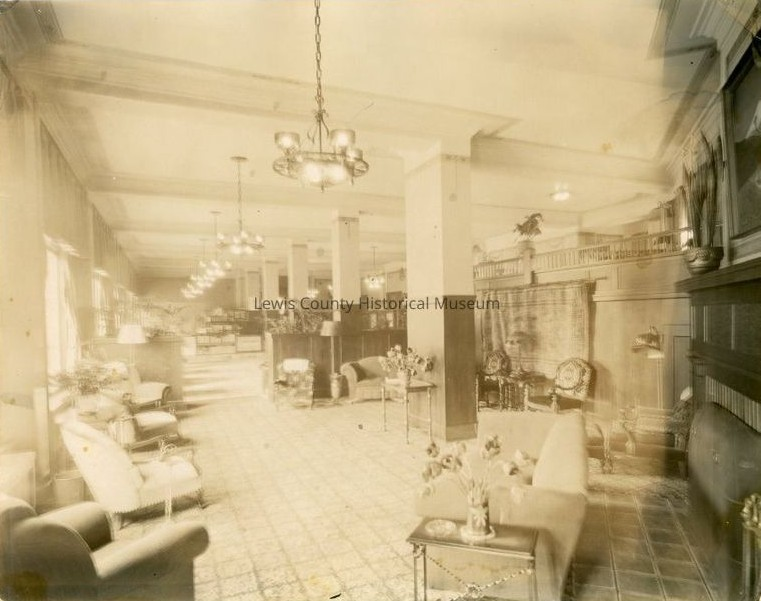
Lobby, 1921

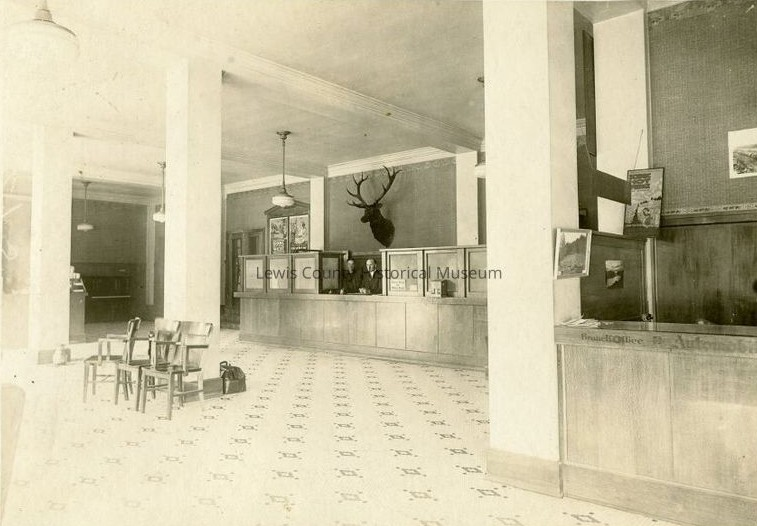
Lobby, ca. 1925

== Renovations and restorations ==
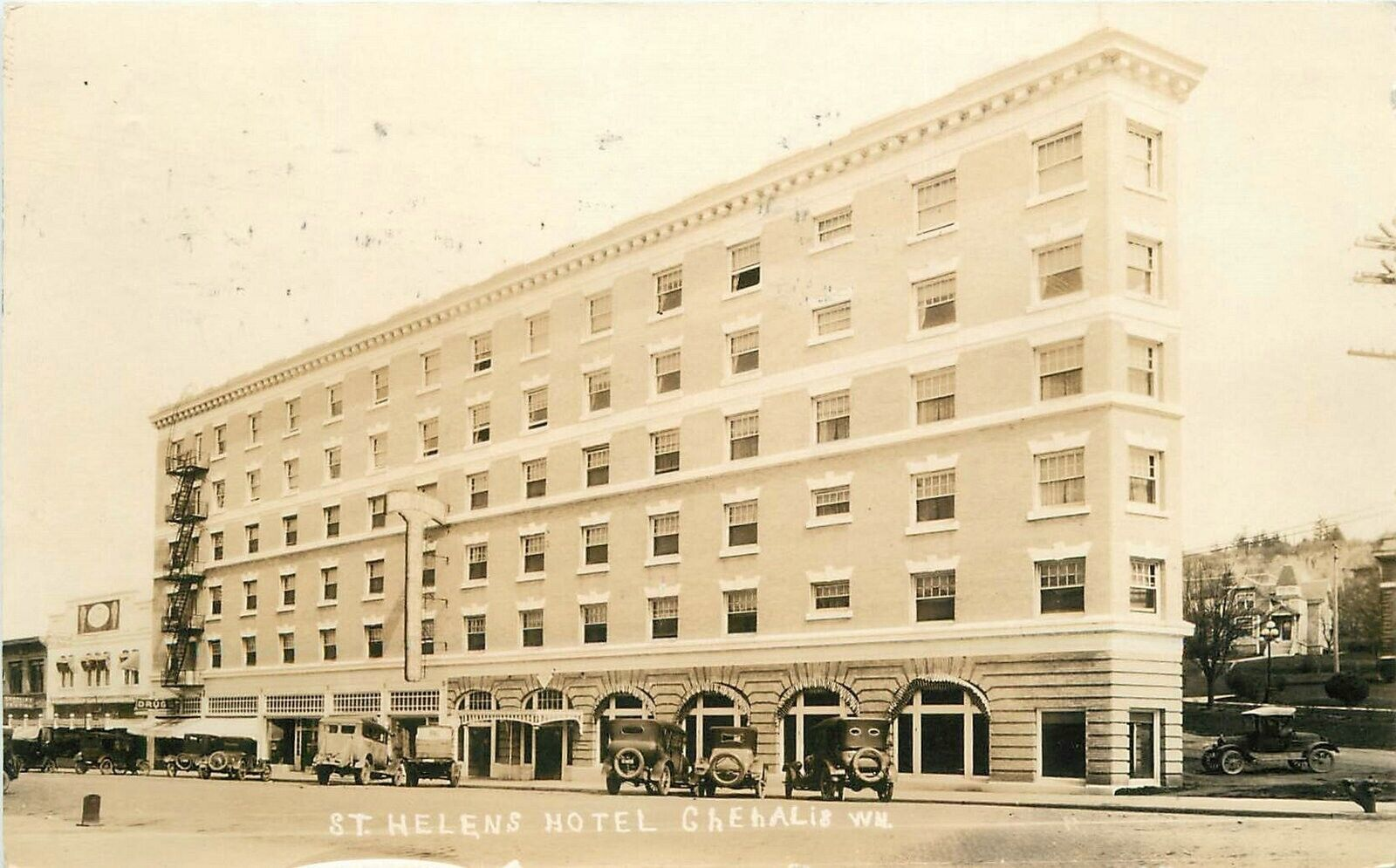
St. Helens Hotel, post 1921 completion

The earliest known report of renovations occurred in 1902, declared as a revarnishing with additional general tasks that had the interior "brightened up".

The 1910 annex addition created an additional 26 rooms and cost $20,000. Despite the hotel being completed by 1920, the lobby was reworked in 1923 with walls retinted and the space redecorated. The lobby was remodeled again in 1931, adding new decorations and dividing the space to provide areas for smaller, social gatherings. Upgrades to the St. Helens Hotel were undertaken in 1936 to add a private roof garden and recreation area on the second floor. A marquee was installed and redecorating changes to the lobby were begun, including the installation of a double-door entrance.

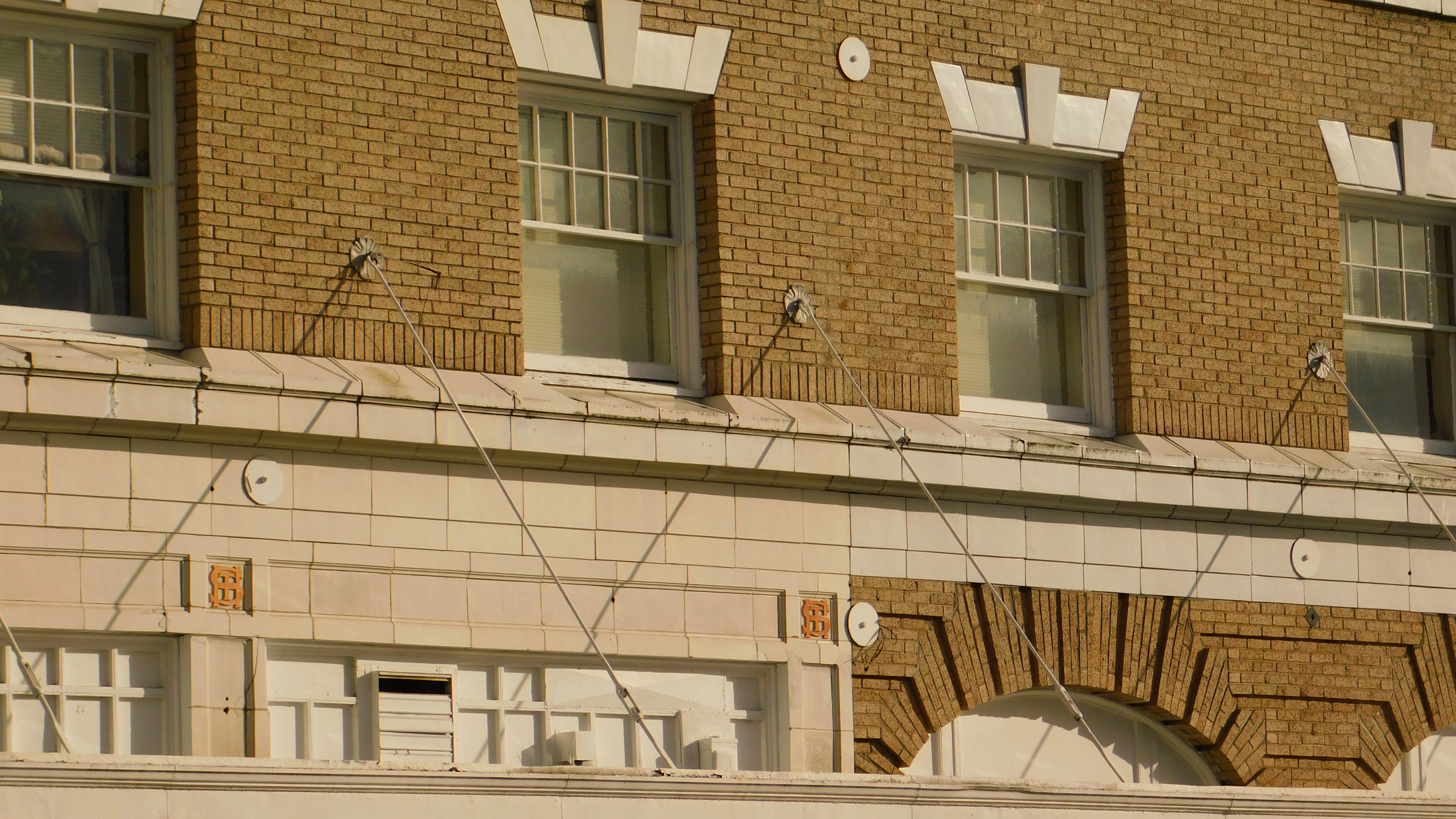
Exterior detail, 2025

Pemerl added a cocktail lounge in 1949, spending approximately $100,000 during his management run to remodel and upgrade the site, converting some rooms into apartments in 1965. The heating source for the building, which had used sawdust as fuel, was converted to oil in 1952. By 1970, the building contained 42 living quarters but only three more rooms were outfitted as apartments under the John and Joy Bellour ownership by 1975. The Bellours added a teak dance floor to the restaurant and redecorated and remodeled several areas of the hotel. Financial issues led to a lack of heat and rooms failing building codes and fire safety requirements. Tenants were asked to leave the premises upon request from Joy Bellour in October 1975.

After the sale of the hotel in 1976, a $1.0 million conversion from hotel to apartments began. Early planning included creating apartments specifically for senior citizens, enlarging the restaurant, and an increase in parking spaces for tenants. Additional outlines included keeping some hotel services, such as room service, but no overnight accommodations. The renovation relocated the main entrance and lobby and the ground floor business space was remodeled, including the removal of the long-standing coffee shop. The conversion was fully completed by 1977. Apartments were updated with new appliances, flooring, paint, and furnished with cable television, a new amenity at the time. A new coffee shop was built along with a new lounge known as the St. Helens Landmark that contained an elaborate forest scene and a showcase for antique items. Tenants had private access to a multi-purpose room on the second floor. A final touch was the inclusion of mailboxes once used at the Tenino post office.

Several renovations were planned after the 2003 sale, including $100,000 worth of upgrades to the retail space. After the St. Helens Inn was sold in 2005, the new owners began a $300,000 renovation that took almost 7 years to complete. The hotel's condition at the time was considered to be rundown, with issues concerning pest infestations and broken equipment, such as the elevator. The project remodeled 50 rooms with a focus on the ground floor retail space and mechanical issues.

== Notable events and visitors ==
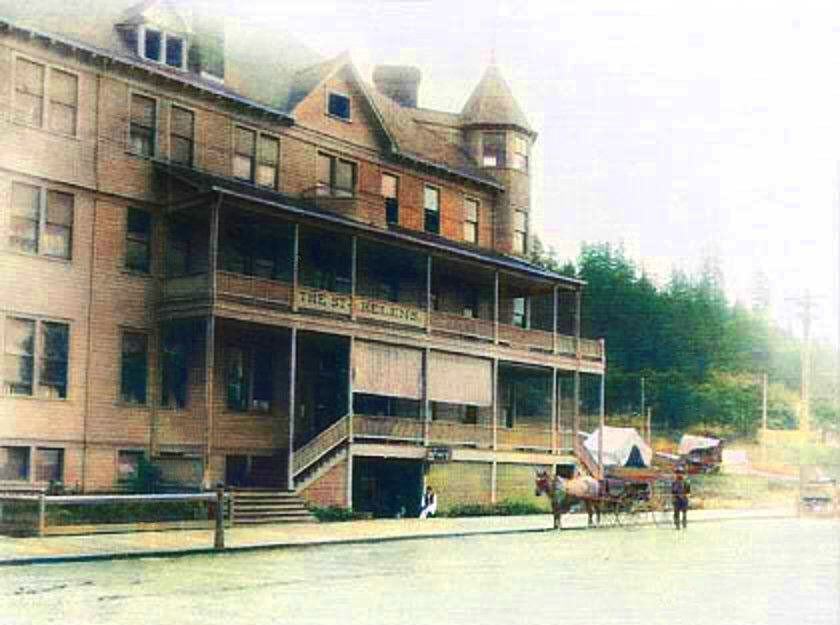
St. Helens Hotel and Ezra Meeker camp, 1906

In 1906, Ezra Meeker camped outside the hotel during the retracing of his original trek in 1852 on the Oregon Trail. Washington governor Marion E. Hay visited the inn during his time in office between 1909 and 1913. Teddy Roosevelt was a guest in late May 1914. In September of that year, a large banquet to honor the 50th anniversary of William West's arrival in Lewis County was held at the St. Helens; West, the "Father of Chehalis", died less than a year later on May 8, 1915. Prince Alexis Mdivani, without his wife, Barbara Hutton, stayed overnight in January 1934 during an evasion to dodge a process server from California. A man known as Larry Hightower, in an attempt to set a record and do "something different" for pushing a wheelbarrow across the United States over several years, was a guest during his travels in October 1950.

The Lasky Production Company rented out 40 rooms for two weeks in December 1922 during a potential film production. The Chehalis-Bee Nugget suggested wives "tether their husbands to an anchor" while the actresses, declared as "very fine looking ladies", were in town. A week later, the reservation was found to be a hoax, perpetrated by a false agent. The Bee-Nugget wrote that wives no longer had to watch their husbands, could go about their business, and were "breathing sighs of relief". In the late 1920s, the St. Helens Hotel began a tradition to place a lighted Christmas tree on the roof. During the late 1920s and into the 1930s, the St. Helens sponsored a championship cup that was awarded to the winner of an annual baseball competition held at Millett Field between the Portland and Seattle teams of the Pacific Telephone & Telegraph Company.

A large banquet was held in November 1931 to honor the president of the National Federation of Business and Professional Women's Clubs after a state-wide visit; the event was sponsored by the local Chehalis chapter. The hotel hosted the celebration of the 50th anniversary of the Chehalis-Bee Nugget newspaper in 1932. On December 28, 1932, a birthday dinner to celebrate the 50th year of the city's incorporation was held at the St. Helens. Another 50th anniversary celebration at the hotel was held in August 1934 in honor of the formation of the city's well-respected Coffman-Dobson Bank & Trust Company.

After the opening ceremonies of the $1.0 million Goodyear Tire plant in 1957 at the newly created Chehalis Industrial Park, a welcome dinner was held at the St. Helens.

Governor Daniel J. Evans spoke at a town hall meeting at the hotel in February 1974. Part of a series of government meetings throughout the state, the event was also attended by three state department directors. Chehalis residents were able to ask a variety of questions, some pertaining to local agricultural concerns, and the assembly focused on youth employment and protection of senior citizen's health and finances.

== Historical rates ==
The St. Helens during the 1940s was considered to be expensive in the area, with breakfast costing a quarter and dinners exceeding 65 cents. Basic rooms were listed at $1.25, while a larger hotel room with a private bath was $4.00. Apartment rent at the completion of the 1976-1977 remodel was between $135 and $300 per month.

== Significance ==
The National Register of Historic Places nomination remarked that the St. Helens Hotel "retains considerable integrity both in its exterior appearance and in the continuing usage of interior space" though the interior lost historic details after several renovations since the 1970s. The St. Helens Hotel, listed as the St. Helens Inn, was added to the NRHP on October 8, 1991. Prior to the national designation, the hotel was listed with the Washington State Heritage Register on August 13, 1987.

Early reporting noted that the St. Helens had an "air of superior neatness and order" and that the hotel makes a "pleasing impression". The hotel was known as the only first-class stop between Portland and Tacoma, and travelers were inclined to "Stop With Bill", a phrase meant to denote visitations with William West due to his popularity. The hotel was the city center for civic gatherings and remained the largest hotel in Chehalis into the mid-20th century. The St. Helens is the tallest building in the city and a distinct marker of the historic downtown district. The hotel is included in the Chehalis city logo.
