= KITI-FM =

- Winlock, Washington; United States
- Broadcast area: Centralia-Chehalis
- Frequency: 95.1 MHz
- Branding: Live 95

Programming
- Format: Hot adult contemporary

Ownership
- Owner: Premier Broadcasters, Incorporated
- Sister stations: KITI (AM)

History
- First air date: 1995

Technical information
- Licensing authority: FCC
- Facility ID: 53396
- Class: A
- ERP: 410 watts
- HAAT: 256.4 meters
- Transmitter coordinates: 46°32′37.00″N 123°01′06.00″W

Links
- Public license information: Public file; LMS
- Webcast: Listen Live
- Website: live95.com

KITI-FM (95.1 FM) is a radio station broadcasting a hot adult contemporary format. Licensed to Winlock, Washington, United States, it serves the Centralia-Chehalis area in western Washington.

== History ==
The radio station began as KGLM, owned by Glenn McCormack, and was sold to Don Whitman in 1955. After the sale, a contest to rename the station was held and KITI was chosen. KITI was sold in mid-1977 to Premier Broadcasters, Seattle, and air time hours were extended from early morning to late evening; the station up to this time broadcast only during the day. The station originally broadcast out of an office in the Chehalis Downtown Historic District next to the Chehalis Theater. The company later moved operations to the St. Helens Hotel. By the 1977 ownership transfer, the KITI station was located in its own building near the Southwest Washington Fairgrounds between the twin cities of Centralia and Chehalis.

During the 1996 flood in the Chehalis Valley, KITI was the only station in the area to continue to broadcast emergency information during the natural disaster, despite floodwaters inundating the station.

== Content ==
Country music was a main programming staple during the 1950s, hosted by locally-known disc jockey, Doc Watson. Broadcasts into the 1970s included the programs of Paul Harvey and sports announcer, Keith Jackson. Ballgames for the Seattle Mariners were aired and news broadcasts came from local coverage and ABC News.
