= KITI (AM) =

- Centralia, Washington; United States
- Broadcast area: Centralia/Chehalis
- Frequency: 1420 kHz
- Branding: KITI 1420 AM 100.5 FM

Programming
- Format: Oldies

Ownership
- Owner: Premier Broadcasters, Incorporated
- Sister stations: KITI-FM

History
- First air date: 1977

Technical information
- Licensing authority: FCC
- Facility ID: 53398
- Class: B
- Power: 5,000 watts (unlimited)
- Transmitter coordinates: 46°42′08″N 122°55′58″W
- Translator: 100.5 K263BS (Centralia)
- Repeater: 92.9 KVNW (Napavine)

Links
- Public license information: Public file; LMS
- Webcast: Listen Live
- Website: live95.com

KITI (1420 AM) is a radio station broadcasting in an oldies format. Licensed to Centralia, Washington, United States, it serves the Centralia-Chehalis area in western Washington. KITI airs news from ABC News Radio on the top of each hour.

== History ==
The station first signed on the air in 1954 with the call sign KGLM. Founded by Glenn McCormack, the station was originally licensed to Chehalis, Washington, and operated as a daytime-only station on 1420 kHz. In 1955, the station was sold to Don Whitman, who held a listener contest to rename the station; the winning entry was KITI, intended to be pronounced as "The Kitty".

In 1977, the station was purchased by Premier Broadcasters, Inc., a company led by Dick Shannon. Under Premier Broadcasters, KITI expanded its technical capabilities, eventually moving its studios to a shared facility with its FM sister station in Centralia. For several decades, the station featured a "Full Service" format, providing a mix of adult contemporary music, local news, and extensive coverage of Lewis County high school sports.

In the 2010s, the station transitioned to an oldies format, and later shifted to its current classic hits identity. Today, the station simulcasts its AM signal on FM translator K263BS at 100.5 MHz, allowing for 24-hour FM coverage of the Twin Cities area.
