= Marko Kitti =

Finnish author (born 1970)

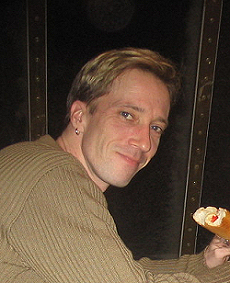
- Marko Kitti
- Born: 11 July 1970 (age 56); Turku, Finland

Marko Kitti (born 11 July 1970) is a Finnish author. He has published four works of fiction in the Finnish language for adult readers and a novel for Young Adult readers. He is also the author and illustrator of the Jesper Jinx books, the middle-grade chapter book series written in the English language. He was a candidate for the 2009 Runeberg prize.

== Bibliography ==
Finnish publications

- Kottarainen (The Starling). Helsinki: Arator, 2001. Short story collection. ISBN 952-9619-82-0.
- Viidakko (The Jungle). Helsinki: Arator, 2003. Novel. ISBN 952-9619-85-5.
- Meidän maailma (Our world). Helsinki: Arator, 2008. Novel. ISBN 978-952-9619-92-4.
- Isiä ja poikia (Fathers and Sons). Helsinki: Arator, 2010. Short story collection. ISBN 978-952-9619-95-5.
- Oliivityttö (Olive girl). Helsinki: Tammi, 2012. Youth novel. ISBN 978-951-31-6644-1.

English publications

- Jesper Jinx. CreateSpace, 2014. Illustrated middle-grade chapter book. ISBN 978-1-4974-5822-2.
- Jesper Jinx and the Sneezing Season, 2014. CreateSpace, 2014. Illustrated middle-grade chapter book. ISBN 978-1-4992-9293-0.
- Jesper Jinx and the Turkish Pepper, 2015. CreateSpace, 2015. Illustrated middle-grade chapter book. ISBN 978-1-5010-2597-6.
- Jesper Jinx Goes Fishing, 2015. CreateSpace, 2015. Illustrated middle-grade chapter book. ISBN 978-1-5086-0008-4.
- Jesper Jinx and the Scrumptious Snacks, 2016. CreateSpace, 2016. Illustrated middle-grade chapter book. ISBN 978-1-5170-3281-4.
- Jesper Jinx's Best Friend, 2016. CreateSpace, 2016. Illustrated middle-grade chapter book. ISBN 978-1-5350-2129-6.
- Jesper Jinx and the Mouse Mayhem, 2017. CreateSpace, 2017. Illustrated middle-grade chapter book. ISBN 978-1-5405-6138-1.
- The Piraroo, 2018. CreateSpace, 2018. Illustrated middle-grade chapter book. ISBN 978-1-5407-4875-1.

== See also ==
- Finnish literature
