= James Kelsey (sculptor) =

American sculptor

- Born: November 14, 1964; Milwaukee, Wisconsin
- Known for: Sculpture
- Movement: Abstract expressionism, Modernist

James Edward Kelsey (born November 15, 1964) is an American Abstract Expressionist sculptor best known for creating large stainless steel abstract curvilinear sculptures.

== Biography ==
James Edward Kelsey was born on November 15, 1964, in Milwaukee, Wisconsin. In 1965 his family moved to Renton, Washington, where he spent his childhood until age 13. In 1977 his father was hired by Bell Helicopter and took his family to Tehran, Iran. James was first exposed to the concept of abstract art while living in the Middle East and experiencing the abstract nature of Islamic art. His family left Iran in 1979 due to the onset of the Iranian revolution.

Kelsey discovered his love of creating art in junior high school and experimented with photography, wood shop, ceramics, and a short course in metal casting. When he was in high school, his father died, and he dropped out of school halfway through 10th grade. He immediately attained his G.E.D. and married at age 17, a marriage which lasted six years.

At age 18, he became a firefighter in the United States Air Force and was stationed in Aviano, Italy. While living there, he explored much of the art and architecture of Northern Italy, Venice, and Pisa. This is also the first time he met men and women working as full-time artists both as painters and sculptors.

In 1987, he was honorably discharged from the Air Force. Instead of producing art, he enrolled at Big Bend Community College in Moses Lake, Washington to pursue his love of flying. He was awarded a commercial pilot license and continued on to Eastern Washington University, from which he graduated with honors and a degree in Business and Interpersonal Communication.

After College, Kelsey moved back to Seattle, Washington with his partner and soon-to-be wife, Misty Devin, whom he had met in college. In 1996 they moved to Everett, Washington Devins' job. While there, Kelsey wrote his yet-unpublished novel, The Last Icon. In 1998 they moved again, to Bremerton, Washington.

Kelsey decided to finally ignore much of the advice he had heard throughout his life and pursue his love of art with the goal of making it a career. He enrolled in the welding program at Olympic College. By the end of the two-year program, he had created four significant sculptures including And He Offered the Moon To the Sky, his first piece of public art, which can currently be seen on the Olympic College campus.

While still taking classes, he secured a job with a local metal fabrication company as their sole welder and honed his skills while continuing his classes. Two years later, he quit his welding job to work for three years for a local stone sculptor, Will Robinson. Kelsey served as the fabricator for Robinson's bases and fountain basins, as well as learning stone working skills. This was also Kelsey's introduction to the business side of the art world as he accompanied Robinson to his galleries and installed sculptures in clients' homes.

In 2002, Kelsey built his own studio on his property in Port Orchard, Washington.

In 2007, Kelsey divorced from Misty Devin, his wife of 15 years. During the 2008 financial crisis, he struggled to maintain his home and art studio, but as the Great Recession continued in 2012 he was forced to sell before an imminent foreclosure as part of the 2010 United States foreclosure crisis. In November 2012 Kelsey signed a contract with the mint company I.P. Callisons and traded three of his sculptures, Helios, Industrial Heart, and Eye of the Beholder, II, for one of their 7,000 square foot facilities in Centralia, Washington.

In 2013 Kelsey was commissioned by the Fred Hutchinson Cancer Research Center in Seattle, Washington to create Touching the Intangible and Tuareg Sun.

== Major works ==
Memories in Blue (executed in 2005–2006) is the primary sculpture in a memorial installation for the Tacoma Police Department. Also in this installation is For All They Gave, a bronze and granite piece with the names, dates, and stories of each officer who died in the line of duty. Connecting these to sculptures is a 100-foot glass line titled Thin Blue Line.

Tsunami in Steel (2009) is Kelsey’s first international sculpture. It is a private / public collaboration between Am-Pri Homebuilders and the City of Richmond, British Columbia, Canada. Inspired by the 2004 tsunami in the Indian Ocean, Kelsey was unable to let the thoughts and images out of his mind.

Touching the Intangible (2013) is part of the Fred Hutchinson Cancer Research Center's art collection. The sculpture represents the efforts of doctors and scientists who search for the causes and cures of HIV/AIDS and other infectious diseases. From the artist: "Everyone at The Hutch is on a never-ending search for cures for diseases. The irony is that once they discover a potential cure, they simply pass it on to others to carry on the work and begin their search all over again with yet another disease. They are on the cutting edge of discovery." The sculpture stands in front of the FHCRC's Vaccine and Infectious Disease Building in Seattle.
