= Hotel Washington (Chehalis, Washington) =

Hotel building in Chehalis, Washington

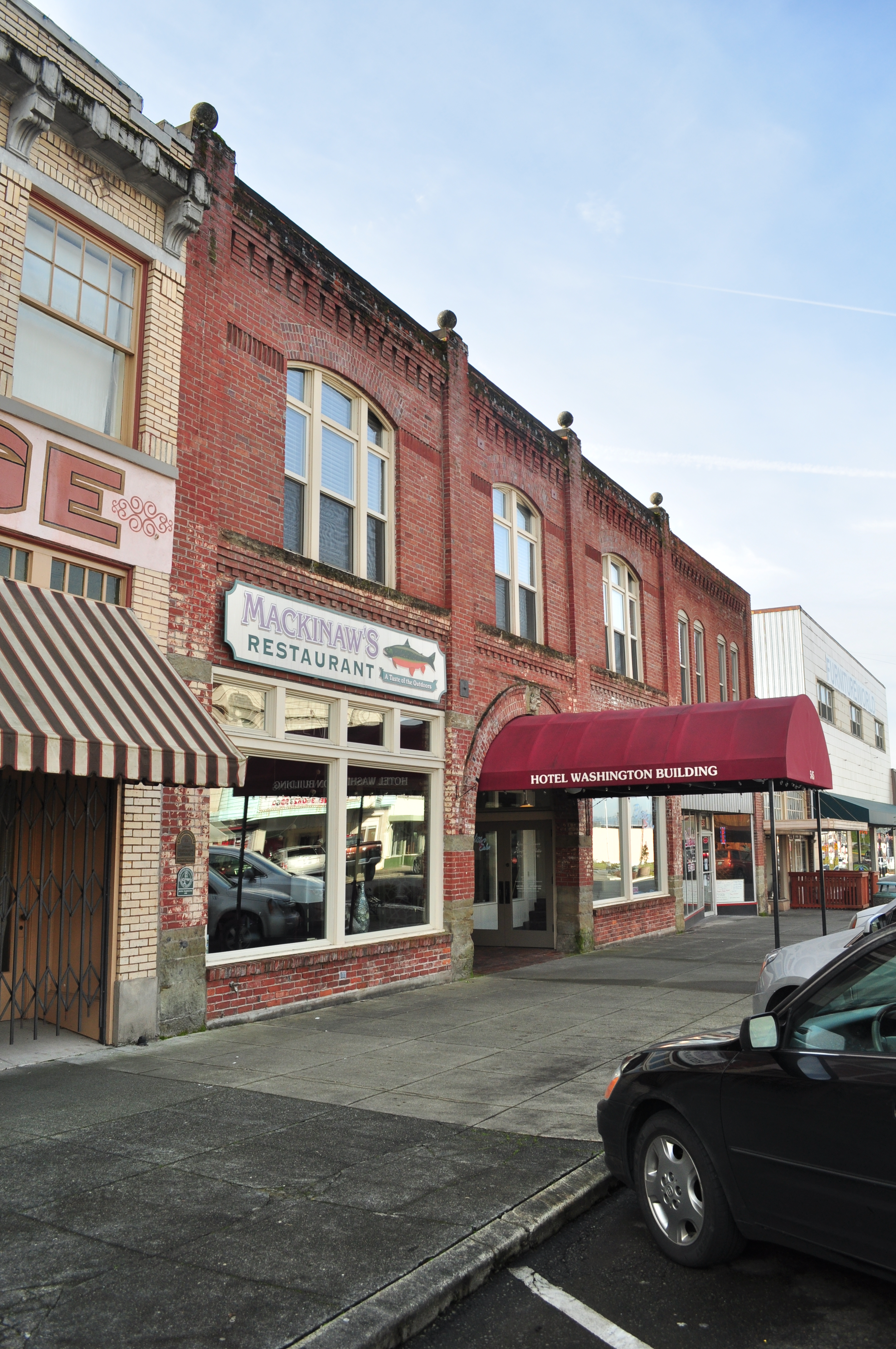
- Hotel Washington, 2015
- Alternative names: Washington Hotel
- Etymology: Named after Washington state

General information
- Status: Open
- Location: 545 North Market Boulevard (Note: Before a city-wide renumbering of addresses in the city in 1975, the original address was 813 Market Street. See sources, pre-1975, for the prior listing.), Chehalis, Washington
- Coordinates: 46°39′56″N 122°58′15″W
- Completed: 1889
- Opened: 1889
- Renovated: Multiple renovations, including 1997
- Owner: Jason and Shawna Boettner

Height
- Top floor: Vintage Grand Room, rooftop patio

Technical details
- Material: Brick
- Floor count: 2
- Floor area: 12,000 square feet (1,100 m^{2})

Renovating team
- Main contractor: Frank Mason
- Awards: Washington State Historic Preservation Officer's Award for Outstanding Achievement, 1999

Other information
- Parking: Street

Website
- The Vintage Grand Room - Hotel Washington

The Hotel Washington, also known as the Washington Hotel, is a building located in the Chehalis Downtown Historic District in Chehalis, Washington.

The hotel, built and opened in 1889, was named after the newly formed state of Washington. The ground floor of the venue became of use as a restaurant and commercial space and in 1911, home of the Dream Theater, which existed until the late 1920s. The movie house and vaudeville theater became the Peacock Theater in 1930, and later as the Grand Theater, permanently shuttering by the end of the 1930s.

Ownership changed frequently, especially during the 1920s, and the hotel underwent numerous renovations in order to create a successful business. Several original features were covered by plaster or stucco, including the brick façade.

The Hotel Washington suffered a devastating fire in July 1997. The blaze, considered one of the worst in the city's history, destroyed the top two floors of the building. A Chehalis couple, Barbara and Frank Mason, purchased the hotel and began restoring the structure. In the process, some original details were found and saved, including a ghost sign for the Dream Theater.

The hotel reopened as a retail space by June 1998. The Vintage Motorcycle Museum, a collection owned and operated by the Masons, was moved to the second floor which also contained a renovated space known as the Grand Room. The Masons sold the Hotel Washington in 2017 and the museum moved to another location in the downtown district in 2021.

== History ==
=== Opening and early 20th century ===
The Hotel Washington, also known as the Washington Hotel, was opened in 1889 under the ownership of two men known as Mr. Berry and Mr. Loomis. The hotel was named in honor of Washington state as both were created during the same year. (Note: Other sourcing mentions that Mr. Berry, known as Sam Berry, purchased the hotel in April 1890 and was to have it "refitted". It is unknown from the sources used throughout the page if Berry was an original partner and thus purchased full ownership from Mr. Loomis, or Berry was not connected to the construction of the Hotel Washington, afterwards becoming the proprietor.) By 1910, the Hotel Washington was known as one of "oldest established hostelries" between Portland and Seattle.

A car, used to bus hotel patrons to and from the venue, was first purchased in June 1906. A wagon, used to transfer luggage from the city's Northern Pacific Depot, was added to the hotel's fleet in 1908.

By 1907, the hotel was under ownership of J.D. Rice and contained a dining room that prior to the year had been temporarily closed. The dining area was reopened in early August, hosting an a la carte cafe. The cafe was located directly behind the lobby which had been updated at the same time to include linoleum floors and Mission chairs, with the space decorated in "harmonious colors". Additional improvements to the building included electric-lighted chandeliers and window views in each of the 32 refurnished, modern hotel rooms. By September, each room was installed with a telephone after the hotel was wired for such by the Sunset Telephone Company. The cost of the entire efforts were reported by Rice to be "several thousand dollars".

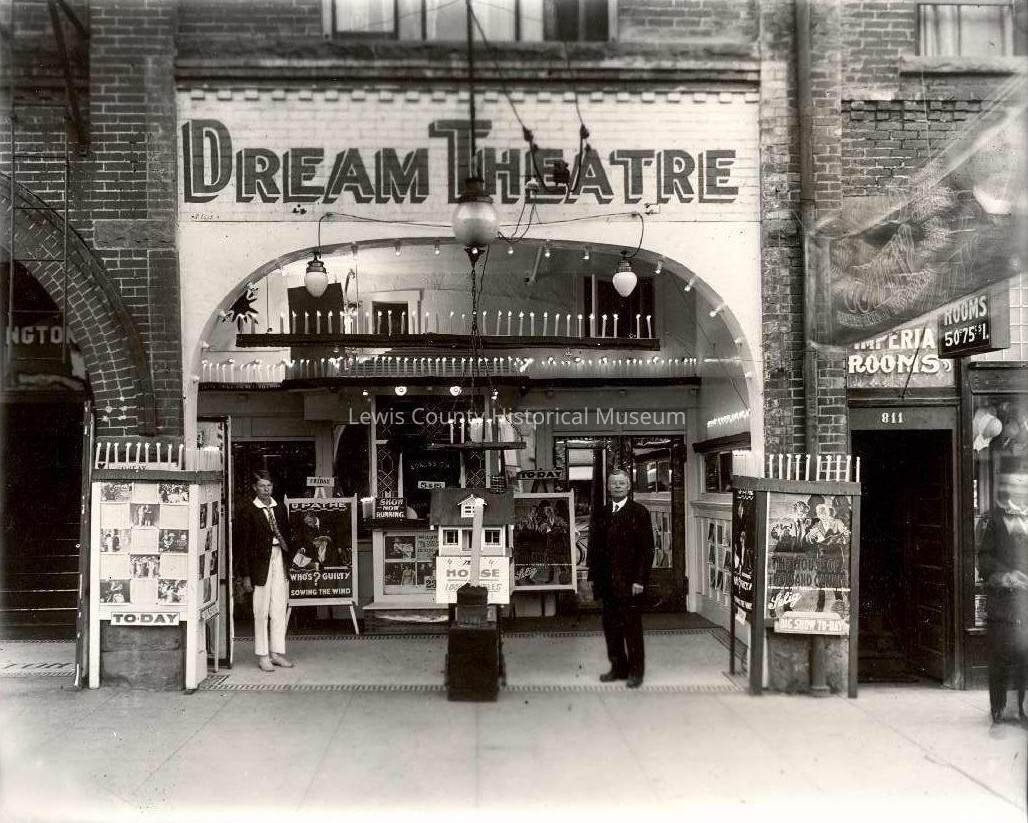
Dream Theater at the Hotel Washington, 1915

Ownership and management changed often during the late 1900s, as the parties involved reported they were either "burdened with other interests" or had "little time" to give to the hotel's operations. Local news reports found attempts to run the hotel during this time as consistently disappointing and fruitless despite the need for the hostelry in the city. The idleness of the commercial space was theorized to be the reason for the lack of success at the Hotel Washington. After C.B. Seidel transferred his lease to a realty company known as Harrison & Pepin, the group then sold their interest by the end of 1910 back to J.D. Rice. The venue was noted to be "run down" but could be a first-class hotel as the building contained "many finely furnished rooms" with a restaurant that was considered "one of the best". Rice planned to open his own dry goods store, and continued to oversee the cafe, within the commercial space on the ground floor. Rice announced weeks later in January 1911 that he was to open a movie house, known as the Dream Theater, at the hotel; his store became a millinery shop.

=== 1920s to 1980s ===
Rice was sued in 1920 by a Jas. Haney who worked for Mrs. C.A. Houston, the acting proprietor who subleased the hotel the prior year. The $10,250 (equivalent to $164,732 in 2025) lawsuit alleged that Rice failed to maintain the building, which led to Haney breaking his leg after falling from a "rotten" ladder attempting to repair leaks from the roof that had begun to cause damages between second and fourth floors of the hotel. The case was dismissed.

Rice sold the hotel to Mr. and Mrs. Thomas Crowley in 1922. The couple expressed hopes to maintain the venue and its offerings in the "home-like" and "congenial" atmosphere associated with the Hotel Washington under Rice's oversight. Ownership changed again in 1928 to Mr. and Mrs. Charles P. Wright. The Wrights began making improvements to the hotel to bring it up to date, similarly referring to the improvements to be "homelike". The next year, operations were sold to Mr. and Mrs. W.J. Barclay, announcing redecorating and rearranging efforts to convert the business into a "family hotel". A month later, oversight of the Hotel Washington was under A.J. and Mina Parrott. (Note: The Parrott name is sometimes spelled as "Parrett" in reports. See sources for the discrepancy.) A city permit was granted at the end of the year for the Parrotts to begin repairs on the building, including the rebuild of a stairway.

In 1929, during Prohibition, the hotel's night clerk, Joseph Kennedy, was arrested for storing a gallon, plus multiple pints, of whiskey at the venue. The Chehalis chapter of the Sea Scouts opened new quarters at the hotel in March 1931. Mina Parrott assigned the boys three rooms on the fourth floor. (Note: The room numbers for the Chehalis Sea Scouts were listed as 43, 44, and 45.)

During the Great Depression, the mortgage of the hotel was foreclosed by the Olympia Building and Loan company in April 1933. The action was part of an outstanding debt of $64,500 (equivalent to $1,604,210 in 2025) that included other property owned by Mina Parrott and J.D. Rice. To satisfy the debt, the hotel was sold by the county sheriff's office to the loan company for over $13,000 (equivalent to $312,873 in 2025) in July 1934.

A small fire occurred in April 1935. Suspected to be caused by a cigarette alighting a mattress, the blaze was contained to one room with the loss of a few clothes and paper money. Another mattress fire caused by a lit cigarette occurred in July 1961. Other than smoke in the hotel, no damages, other than the destroyed bedding, were reported. (Note: The mattress from the 1961 incident had been thrown through a window after it caught fire.)

Due to illness of the owners, the hotel was listed for either sale or trade in July 1963. A follow-up announcement the next month listed the hotel for sale only, reasonably priced, with a business owner's apartment. The opportunity was noted to be "ideal for working man and wife" or for a semi-retired couple.

=== 1997 fire ===
The Washington Hotel suffered a destructive fire on July 11, 1997. (Note: The 1997 fire took place one month after the downtown district was added to the state's historic registry.) The fire began approximately at 4:15 P.M. local time on the roof of the adjoining Red Cross Building, spreading to a furniture store in the hotel, rapidly expanding as mattresses and other goods were engulfed. Fire fighters were forced out of the buildings due to excessive heat and smoke. With flames and smoke reaching over several hundred feet high, the Chehalis fire department, as well as other Lewis County teams, turned to containment, fearing the fire could spread and destroy large portions of the downtown area. (Note: Seven fire departments and 115 firefighters were involved in dousing the 1997 fire.) Over 1 million US gallons (3.8 Ml) of combined water and foam (Note: Reporting mentions that perhaps as much as 2 million US gallons (7.6 Ml) of water, pumping 8,000 US gallons (30,000 L; 6,700 imp gal) per minute, was used during the 1997 fire. The amount of water was such that the day after the fire, the hotel's interior state was described as, "it's raining in here".) was used against the fire, which was considered contained by 7:30 P.M; spot fires were doused into the next day. A total of three firefighters were reported to be injured either due to smoke inhalation or heat exhaustion.

A group of approximately 300 residents, described as "bigger than a crowd at a parade", gathered to watch the fire and the efforts to contain the blaze. Some people were reported to be "drinking pop and eating snacks".

Immediately after the fire, the blaze was suspected to have been started due to the application of tar to the roof of the Red Cross Building. The roofing contractor had left for the day before the fire ignited. A news report from the Seattle Times stated that before the fire broke out, an American Red Cross director had been warned about smoke coming from the roof. Upon inspection, she noticed the swirling smoke and ordered an evacuation of the building. Four days after the conflagration, the roof tarring project was officially deemed the cause and was listed as accidental.

The blaze was considered by the Chehalis fire department to be the "most dangerous in the city's history". The department instituted new training to help fight fires quickly and fittings were replaced on fire hydrants in the city. Along with additional training, the department purchased a $700,000 (equivalent to $1,382,707 in 2025) ladder truck, known as "the Unit", to be able to better respond to a similar fire in the future.

The hotel was gutted, especially the "charred wreck" fourth floor, as well as the Red Cross Building, described as a "hollow shell". The hotel was reported to suffer $1,000,000 (equivalent to $2,005,597 in 2025) in damages. Early plans were to demolish the two buildings and an additional structure. Volunteers and acts of charity throughout the state helped the Red Cross replenish its coffers, disaster supplies, and office equipment. (Note: At the time of the fire, the Red Cross chapter had only $232 in their bank account. Donations after the fire helped increase the funds to $100,000.) The Red Cross Building, constructed in 1894, was rebuilt by its owner, John Panesko. (Note: In March 1997, four months before the fire, a remodeling of the Red Cross Building had been completed.)

The owners of the Hotel Washington, Milo and Phyllis Bloss, had no plans to rebuild or restore the historic building. The city required the basement level to be filled which the Boss family could not afford; the couple suggested instead turning the grounds into a parking lot. They sold the hotel for $10 to Frank and Barbara Mason, a Chehalis family, by October that year. The Masons began restoration efforts immediately, turning a "sow's ear into a silk purse" with early efforts that included the removal of asbestos. The couple used original blueprints of the hotel to restore the building. The efforts included the restoration of wood floors and beaded ceiling, which had previously been covered in plaster. The original exterior brick façade, hidden under stucco, was saved and the arched entryway remained intact. The third floor was removed and replaced with a rooftop patio, and the bottom floor's open space was converted into two suites. Little of the original interior was able to be saved. The hotel was reopened nine months after the fire.

The commercial space on the ground floor, into the late 20th century and up to the fire, was occupied by Phyl's Furniture Store. Losses for the furniture company cost over $200,000 (equivalent to $401,119 in 2025), (Note: Early estimates on losses for Phyl's Furniture Store reached as high as $1 million. The company eventually relocated in 2002 to a nearby building in the downtown district that was once a Sears store. The Phyl's store in Chehalis, which had been in business in the city since 1986, shuttered in 2012.) forcing the business to relocate in the city. Five small businesses occupied the building by June 1998 after the restoration, including shops for computers, floral, and toys. The hotel later became home to the Mason's Vintage Motorcycle Museum which occupied the second floor. The second floor was also renovated to include a space known as the Grand Room.

=== 21st century ===
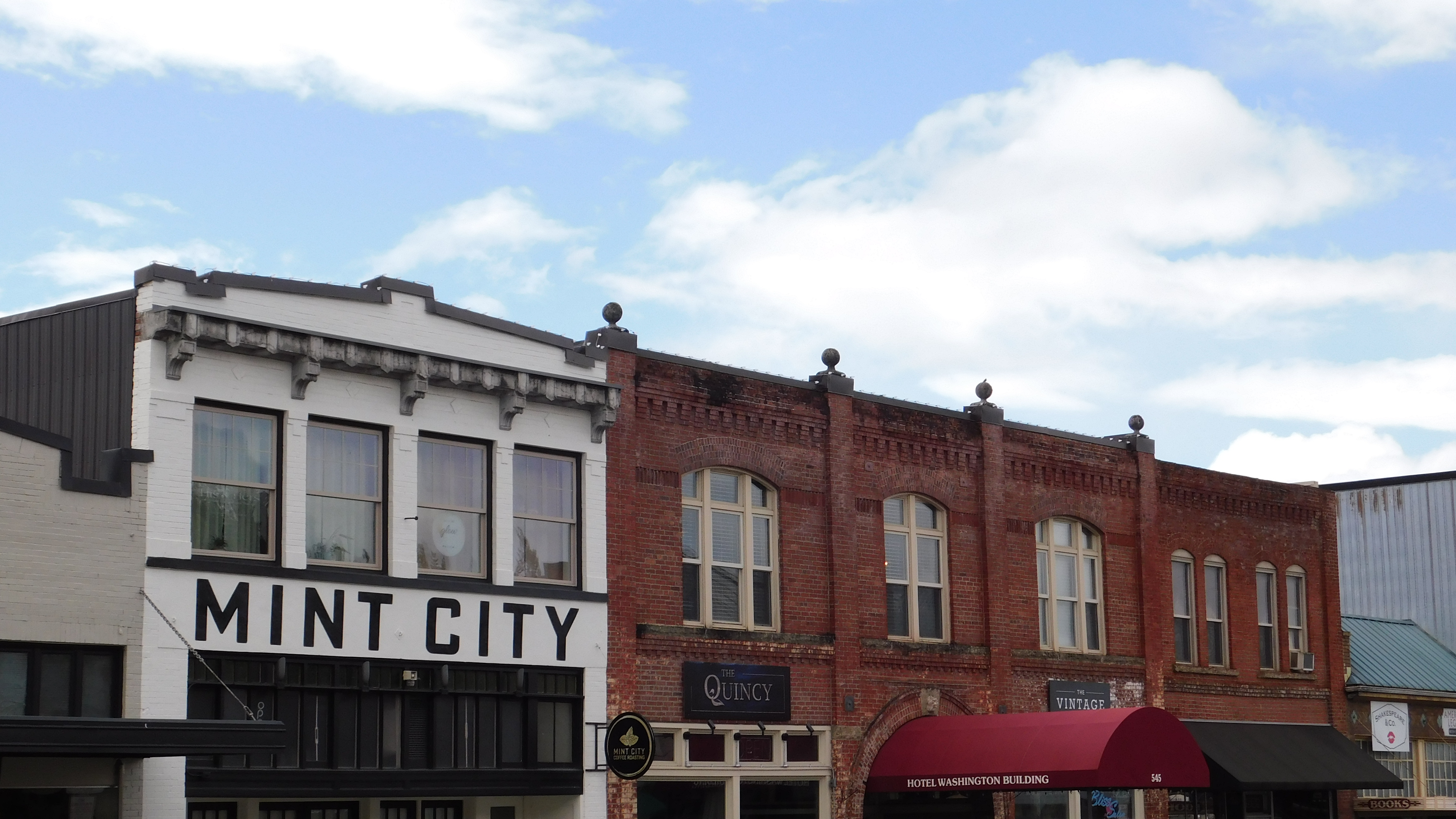
Hotel Washington, 2024

The first restaurant to occupy the hotel's ground-floor commercial space after the 1997 fire was an Italian restaurant known as Aldente Italian Trattoria, owned and operated by the Rose family; the business opened in 2002.

The Masons listed the hotel for sale in 2014, delisting the property after a few months. Although offers to buy the building were placed in the preceding years, the hotel was not sold until November 2017. Purchased by Jason and Shawna Boettner for $650,000 (equivalent to $853,754 in 2025), the sale included the former Red Cross Building, renamed by the Masons as the Vintage Building. The Toledo couple planned to focus on advertising for the Grand Room. Barbara Mason stated that it was "time for younger, greater ideas to come forward in downtown Chehalis" and thus important to "relinquish the historic buildings to someone else".

The Vintage Motorcycle Museum, also known as the Frank Mason Motorcycle Museum, moved its collection from the Hotel Washington in 2021 to the Marketplace Square building, half a block south in the downtown district.

In 2022, Mackinaw's Restaurant, which was located at the Hotel Washington, was subjected to fines and the loss of their liquor license for failing to adhere to COVID-19 protocols for restaurants. The establishment closed in 2023 due to the subsequent loss of business revenue and the costs of litigation.

== Dream Theater ==
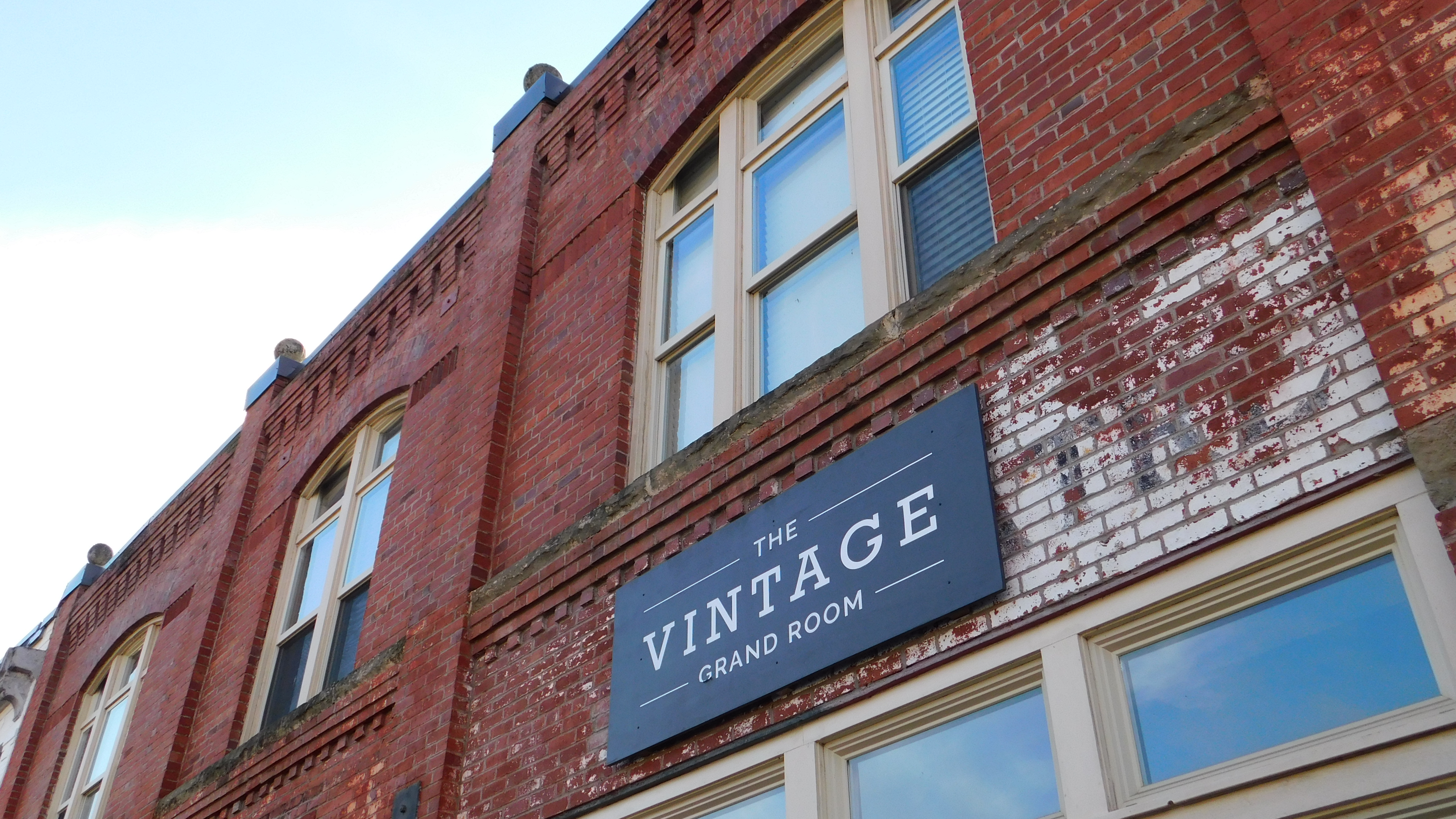
Ghost sign for the Dream Theater

The "famous old Washington" once was home to a moving picture and vaudeville theater, known as the Dream Theater. The establishment opened on January 28, 1911. Originally undertaken and owned by J.D. Rice, the "amusement center" replaced the restaurant, as well as an office space and "dialing room", on the ground floor. (Note: The dialing room overtaken by the Dream Theater possibly refers to either a telephone booth or telegraph room.)

A large sign marketing "The Dream" was hung above the new theater entrance with "illuminated" lettering. A Dream Theater ghost sign is visible on the front entrance side of the structure.

The Dream, shuttered by the end of the 1920s, was remodeled beginning in 1930 and reopened as the Peacock Theater in 1931. The Peacock became known as the Grand Theater in 1934. The movie house permanently closed by the late 1930s.

== Geography ==
The Hotel Washington is located on Market Street in the Chehalis Downtown Historic District, listed on the National Register of Historic Places (NRHP) in 1997. The hotel is considered a "contributing resource" to the historic designation despite damages from the 1997 fire. The rear of the building faces Northwest Pacific Avenue.

== Architecture and features ==
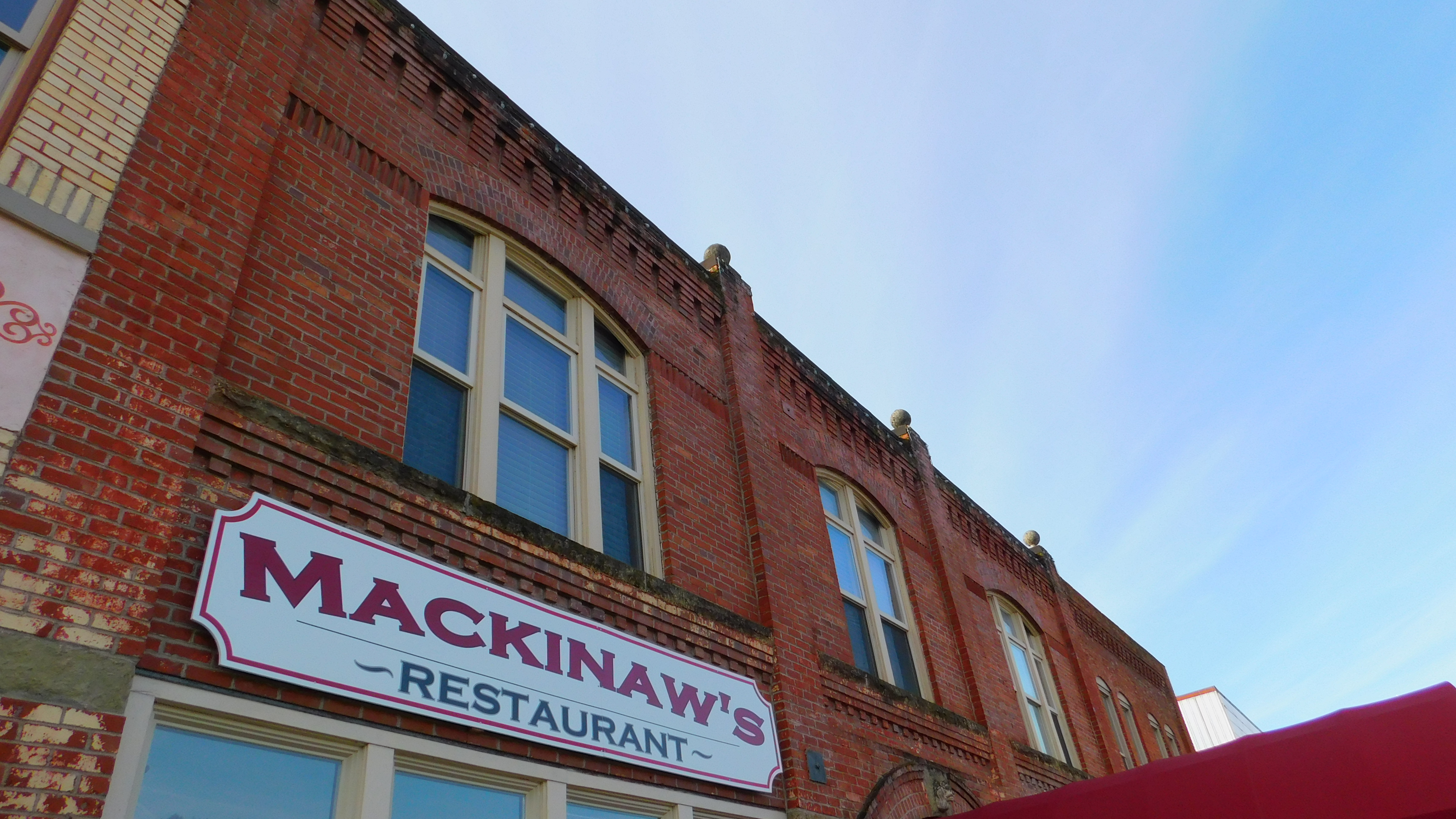
Exterior detail, 2019

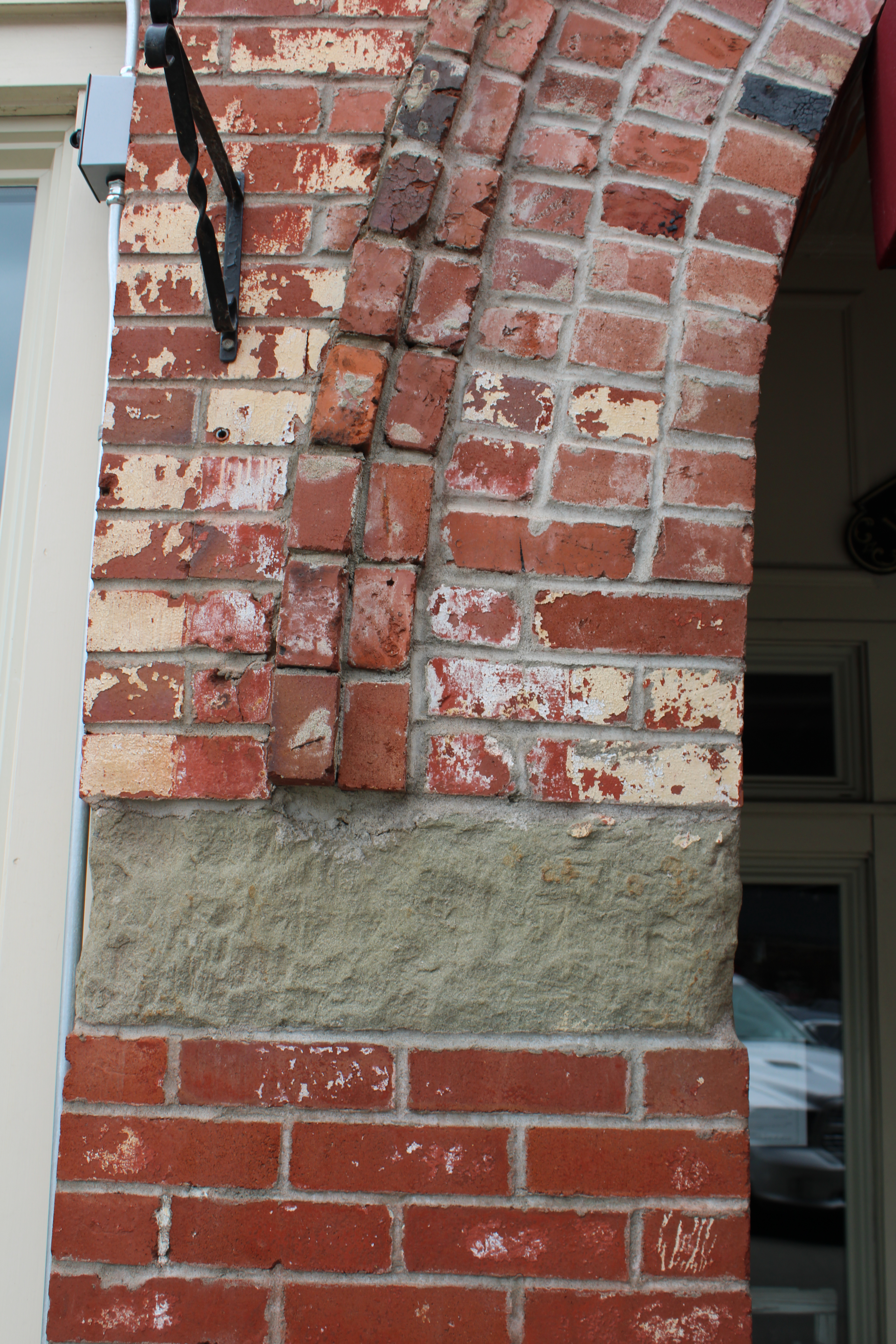
Entrance brick arch, 2024

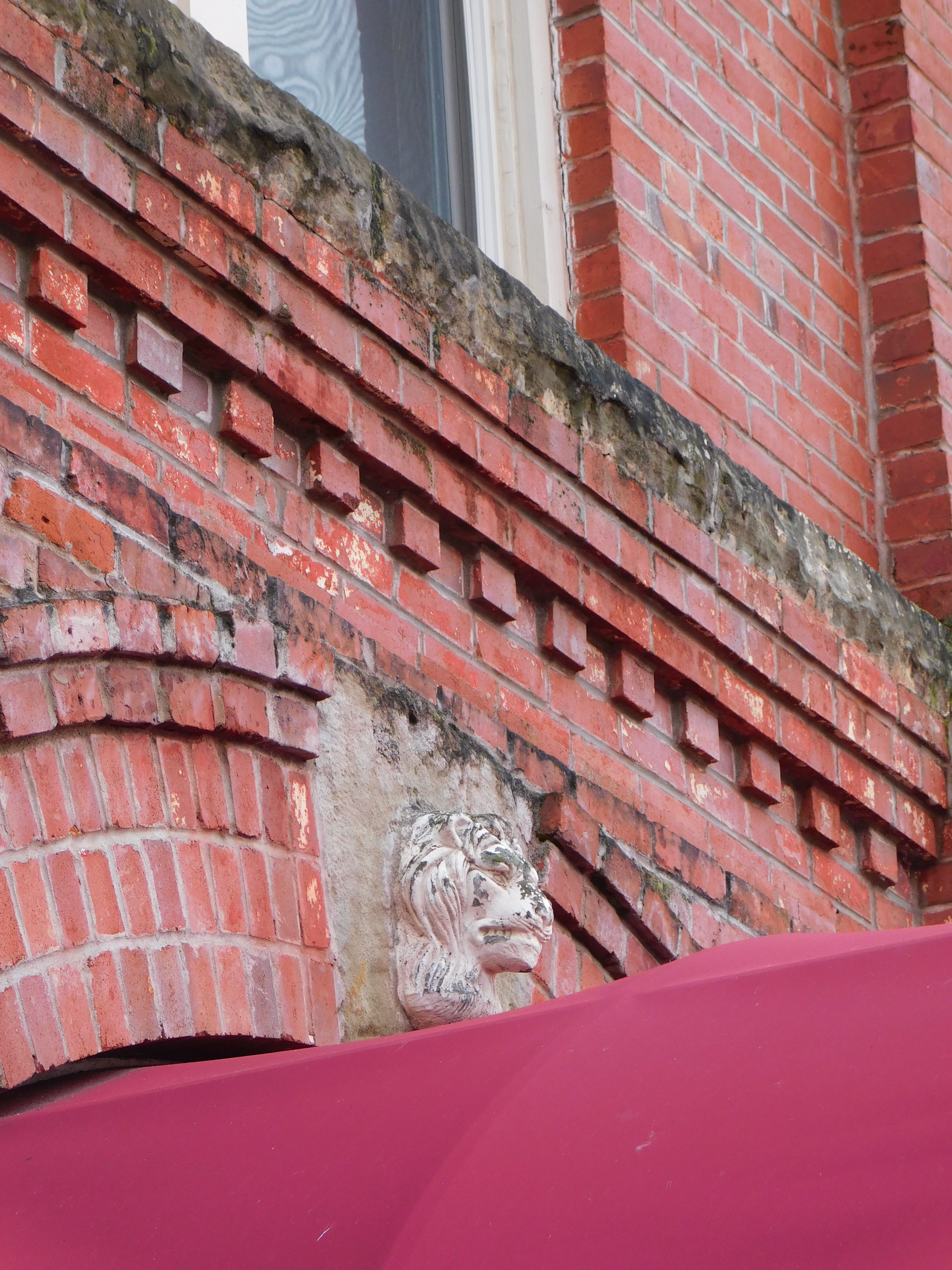
Keystone, main entrance, 2025

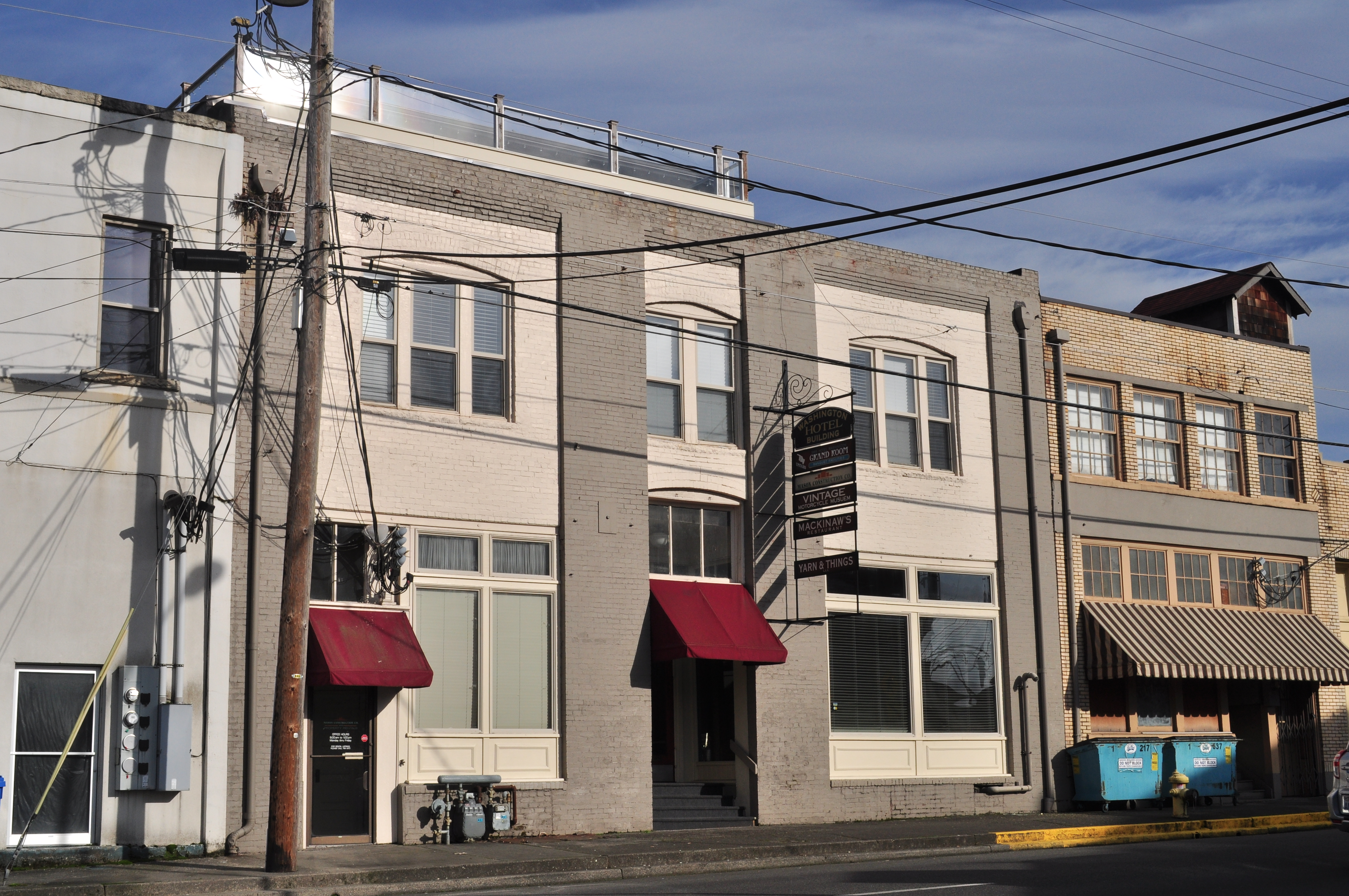
Rear of hotel, 2015

=== Before 1997 fire ===
At the time of the 1997 nomination of the Chehalis Downtown Historic District to the National Register of Historic Places (NRHP), which took place before the fire that same year, listed the hotel to be four-stories tall. (Note: Sourcing varies on the number of floors of the Hotel Washington prior to the 1997 fire. Although the structure was originally four-stories tall, the total number of floors is sometimes reported to be three though a majority of sources mention 4 floors. The rooftop patio, added after the fire, is sometimes referred to as a third floor. See sources throughout the article for the discrepancy.) The building shared firewalls with adjoining structures and had stucco over its original brick exterior. The façade was broken into three sections, separated by four piers. The windows, double-hung and semi-elliptical, were aligned in rows, three horizontally and two vertically.

On the top portion of the exterior of the rear of the hotel, a pressed-metal cladding in a brick pattern remained as of the 1997 NRHP nomination of the downtown district. The upper floors of the interior were noted to still contain original sinks and ghost signs were also noted to remain on the north side of the building.

=== Hotel features in the 21st century ===
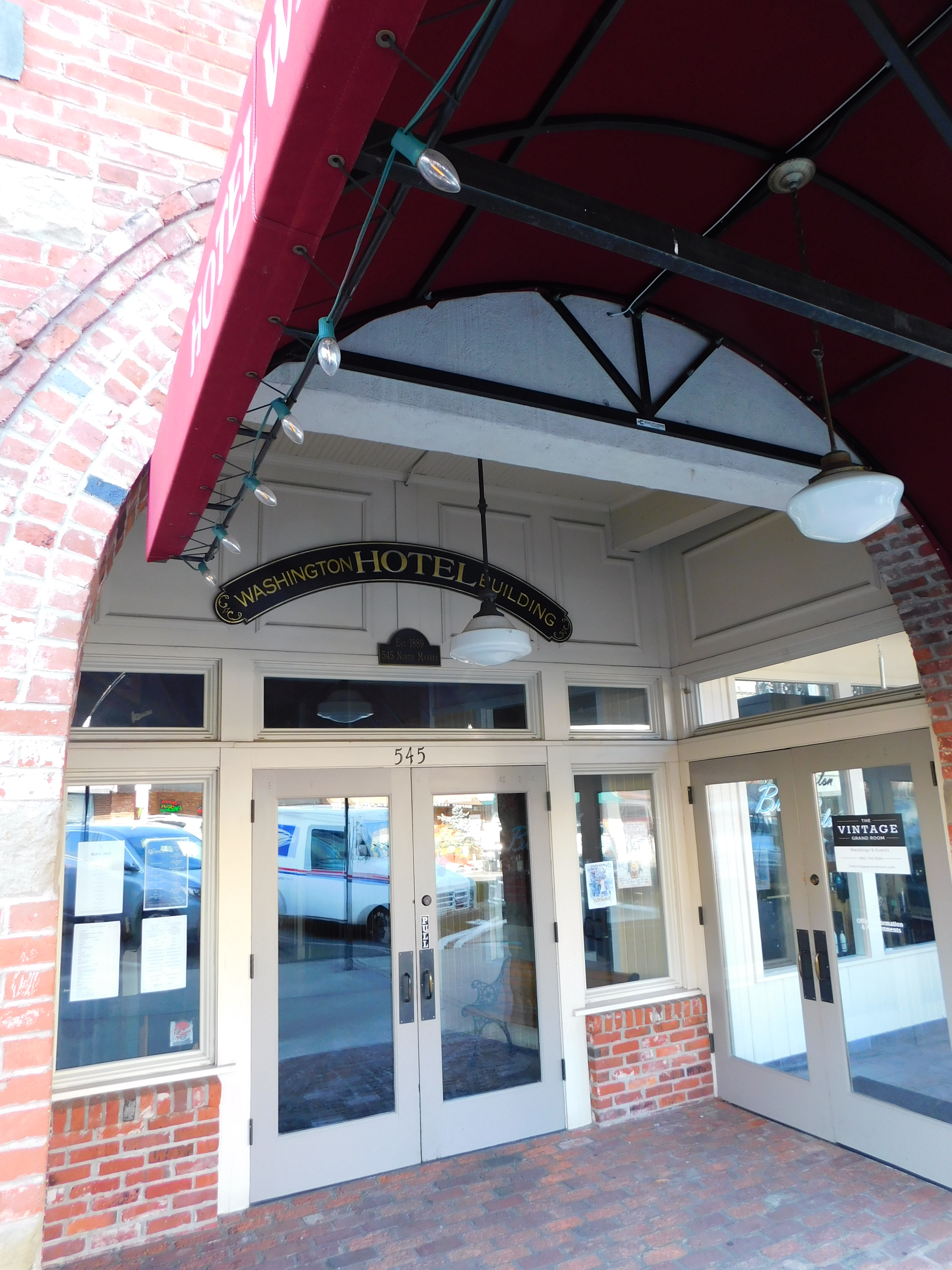
Retreating lobby entrance, 2023

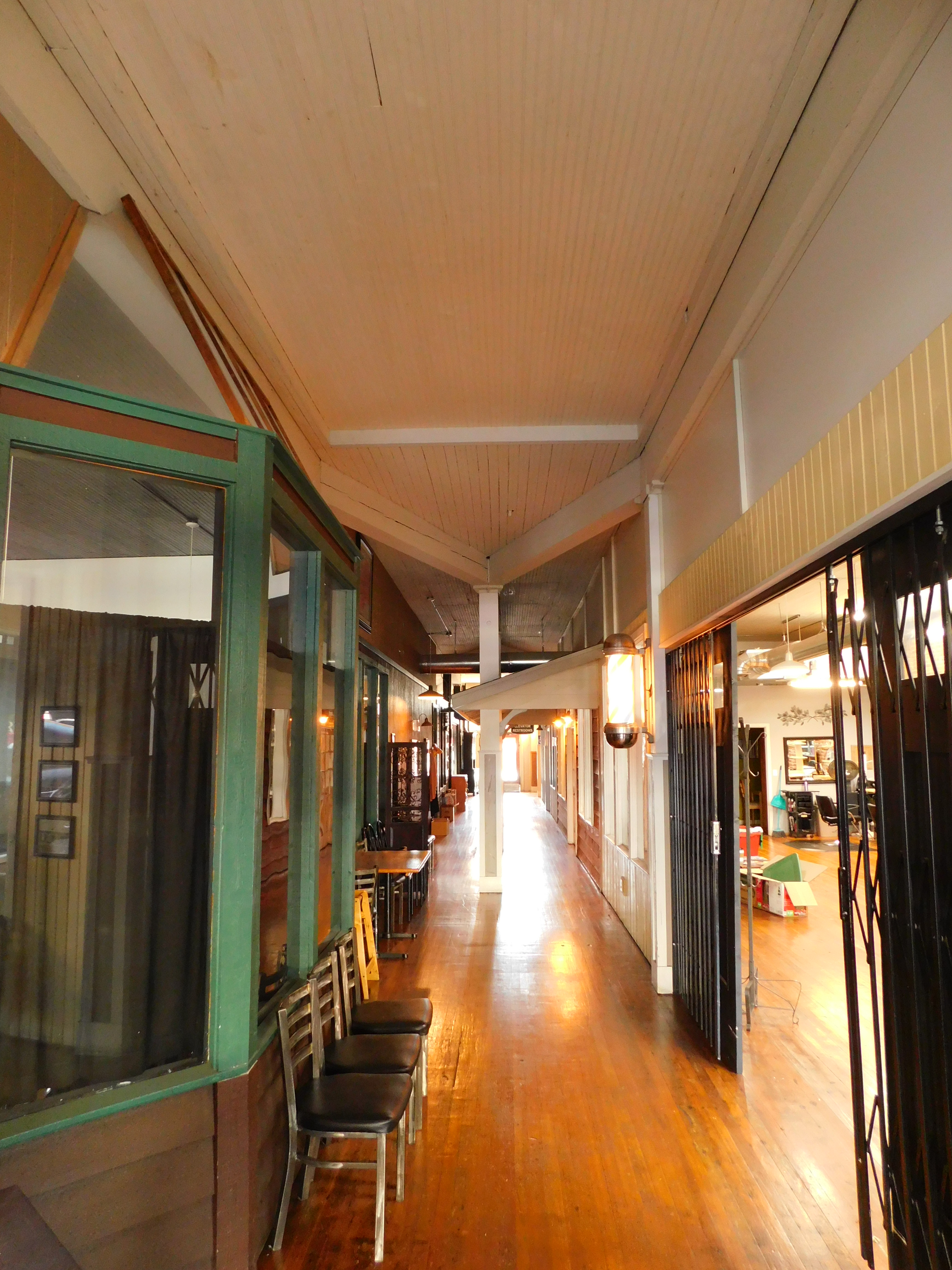
Ground floor, at main entrance, 2024

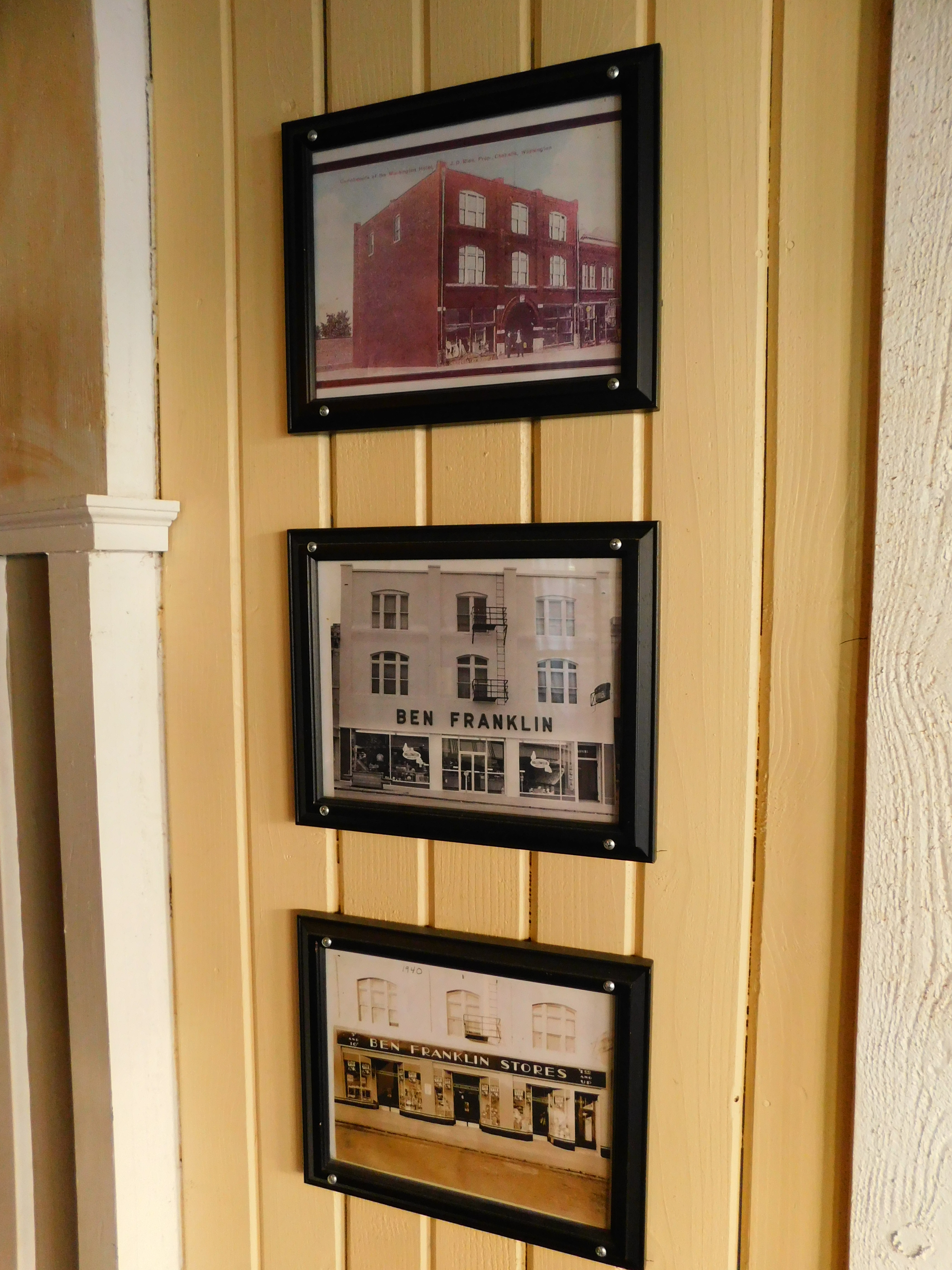
Photo display, 2024

The main entrance is located on Market Street and contains a glass door entrance with a sign marking the original name of the structure, "Washington Hotel Building". (Note: The entrance sign does list the name as the Washington Hotel Building. The word, Hotel, is centered, bolded, and of a larger font. See photos in the article.) The window placement of the surviving two floors remains. What was once the middle row of casements contains a rock-faced sill.

The second floor is listed to encompass 6,000 square feet (560 m^{2}).

=== Extinct features ===
A poolroom was noted to be in existence in 1922 and into 1923. Operations of the business were led by two people known under the names, Lively and Hooper. During the time, a barber shop was also located at the hotel. Both rooms were remodeled beginning in April 1923.

=== Renovations and restorations ===
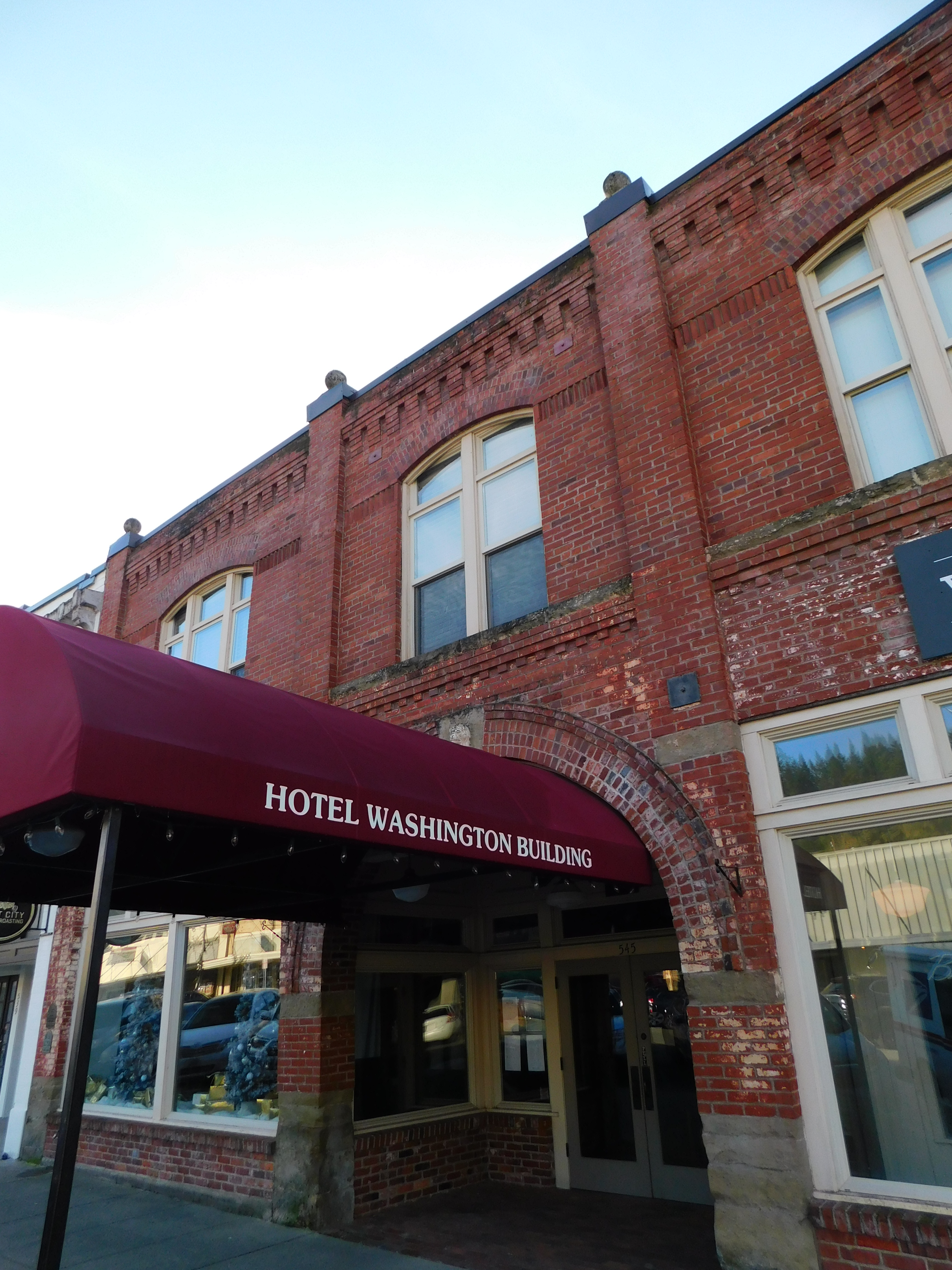
Exterior detail and awning, 2023

One of the first recorded updates to the Hotel Washington was the tiling to the floor of the arched entrance by the owner of the venue at the time, J.D. Rice, in July 1907. In 1930, the interior was painted, noted to have "greatly improved" the Washington Hotel.

The renovation of the hotel after the 1997 fire included the use of bricks from the third floor to restore parts of the main entrance and archway. A rooftop patio was opened on the hotel in 2005 and was meant for special events or for patrons of a restaurant that existed at the time.

Canopies were added the front and rear entrances in 2006. The installation was funded by grants from the Chehalis Historic Preservation Commission as part of a façade improvement program in the downtown district.

== Historical rates ==
Under management of a Mrs. H. Frost in 1911, rates for rooms, described as "first class in every respect", were advertised at 50 and 75 cents, with higher charges of $1 and $1.50 (equivalent to $51.83 in 2025). The facility boasted of being "just remodeled and improved", with new paint and a kalsomined interior. The hotel was noted to heated by steam, with hot and cold water in every room.

In 1927, an "outside room" could be rented for a weekly rate of $4 (equivalent to $74.14 in 2025). Monthly rates were available by 1930.

By the early 1950s, weekly rates were listed as low as $4 (equivalent to $48.5 in 2025) with a monthly option charged at a minimum of $22.50 (equivalent to $279.09 in 2025). More expensive rooms offered housekeeping services. A daily rate was listed at $1.50 (equivalent to $16.16 in 2025) by 1961.

== Recognition ==
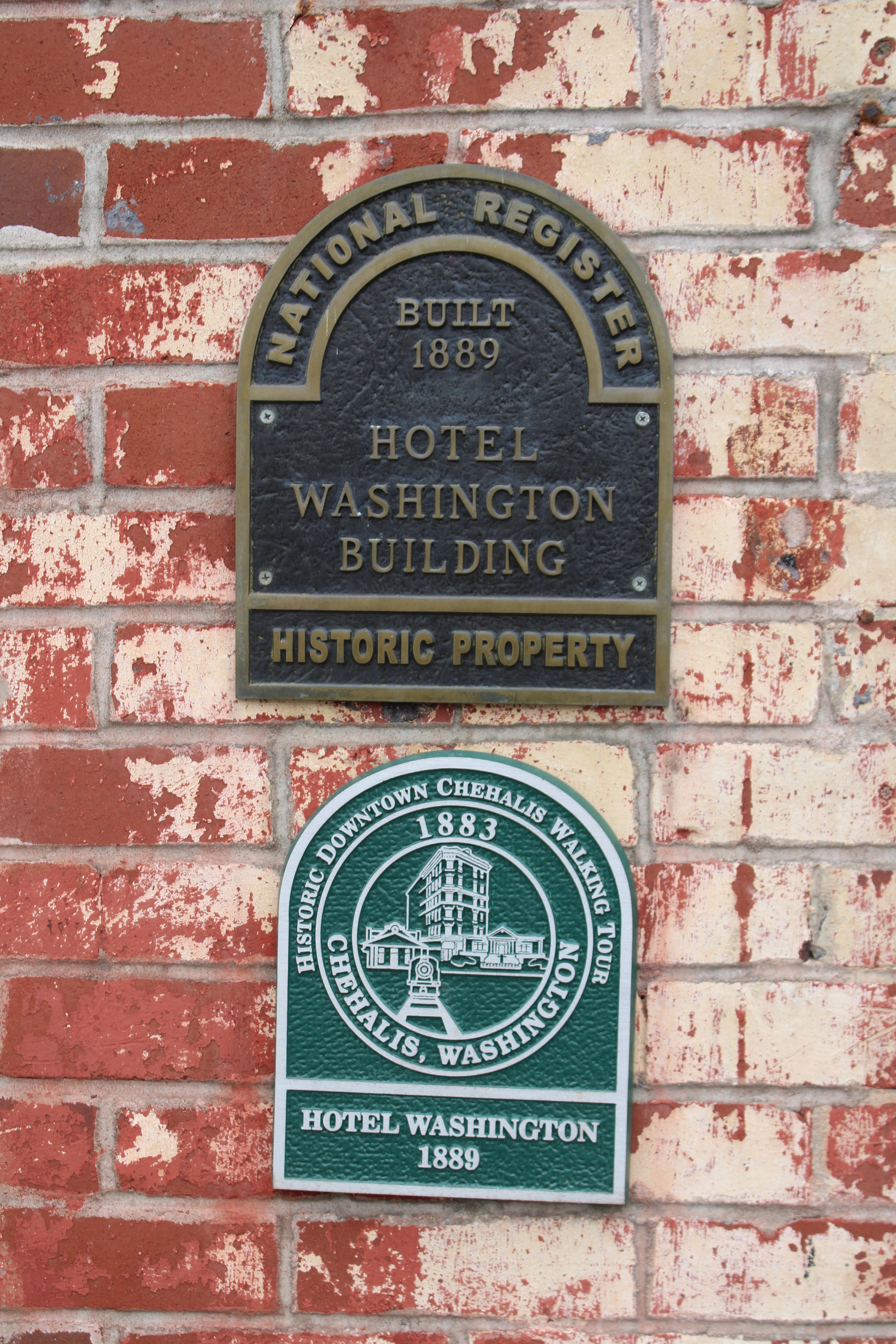
Plaques, 2024

After the completion of the restoration of the Hotel Washington, the Masons were honored by the Chehalis city council for their efforts. Citing the couple's "tremendous foresight and enthusiasm", the council believed the Masons helped to save the business core of the downtown district.

The project also earned the building a Washington State Historic Preservation Officer's Award for Outstanding Achievement in 1999.

== See also ==
- Burlington Northern Depot (Chehalis, Washington)
- St. Helens Hotel
