= History of theaters in Chehalis, Washington =

Theater, movie venue history

The history of theaters in Chehalis, Washington started in 1886 with the construction of a mixed-use opera house and town hall, followed by the Tynan Opera House in 1889. The city experienced more than a 50-year stretch of the build or opening of over a dozen theaters and movie houses in the city, culminating with the opening of the Pix Theater in 1938. No further theater was built or established until the opening of a multi-screen cinema at a local shopping center in 1982.

In the 21st century, the Chehalis Theater, formerly the Pix, is the last remaining single-screen theater in the city and underwent several renovations and reopened as a multipurpose restaurant, live performance club, and movie theater. A multiplex opened at the county mall, located in Chehalis, in 2008.

== History ==
There were numerous early theaters and movie houses in Chehalis at the beginning of the 20th century. They were all located in either the original downtown area of the city on Chehalis Avenue, or in the Chehalis Downtown Historic District on Market Street.

Due to the Great Influenza epidemic from 1918 to 1920, movie theaters in the city were shut down for stretches of time. Stricter quarantine laws in Chehalis led to theaters suffering a loss of revenue as potential customers patronized playhouses in other towns and cities in the region that had more lenient rules. A petition in late 1918, requested by theater owners to the city commissioner board, asked that the laws be lifted for theaters and that individuals, rather than the movie houses, be held to isolation standards.

During 1929, the city celebrated its movie and theater history at the St. Helens Theater by declaring the summer as "Greater Movie Season". The event was considered an anniversary of the first nickelodeon picture shown in Chehalis in 1905, marking a shift from theater productions to film showings. It also coincided with the first year of talkies as well as the importance of the movie theater business in Chehalis. An earthquake in the late evening of November 12, 1939 led to evacuations of theaters in the city during midnight showings; no injuries were reported.

=== Hubristic expansion ===
In the early 20th century, as playhouses were becoming an economic boon and theaters were built and opened with success, several attempts to build more, if not grander theaters, in Chehalis failed to materialize.

The first recorded effort to expand at the turn of the century was a 1902 opera house on Chehalis Avenue. Under construction by J.H. Horst, the eventual buyer of the Tynan Opera House, the building was to offer an ample stage room. In 1906, William Brunswig, owner of the Brunswig Grand Opera House, purchased a large plot in the original downtown district between Chehalis and Pacific Avenues with the intent to construct an "up-to-date" 65 ft × 165 ft (20 m × 50 m) opera theater that could house a 30 foot (9.1 metres) stage. It was to contain a ceiling tall enough that two balconies could be built. The Horst theater and new Brunswig venues were never built.

In 1909, a group formalized plans to begin a mixed-use $25,000 opera house but the project to provide the city with a "modern" theater did not move forward. Beginning later that same year and expanding into 1910, the Odd Fellows social group planned for a large opera house. Also during 1910 there was an attempted expansion for the Orpheum Theater with a proposed $20,000 new home in the downtown district at Park Street and Pacific Avenue. Supposed to open in late summer 1910, the brick, steam-heated building was to be used exclusively as an opera house, was to showcase a large vestibule, be sized to accommodate 750 people, have a 25 ft × 28 ft (7.6 m × 8.5 m) stage, and a balcony with boxed seating.

Another expansion proposal, planned for the Dream Theater, was offered in 1919 and the plans included a new $200,000 combined movie and theater playhouse that would have a suction ventilation system installed, and the theater planned to contain a balcony with a total house occupancy of 850. After several years of potential, the new theater was not built and instead a building was constructed that hosted an automobile garage.

During the beginnings of the conversion of the St. John's Garage to the Liberty Theater in 1923, a 1,000-seat theater was planned to be built across from the St. Helens Hotel in downtown. Given the name, New Palace Theater, it was initially expected to cost $60,000 and to be a mixed-used entertainment venue for film and stage productions. Despite receiving permission and permits from the city, and the cost revised to $40,000, the theater was never constructed.

== Dobson & Donahoe Opera House (1886) ==
Two prominent members of early Chehalis society, John Dobson and Augustine "Gus" Donahoe, created the first recognized opera house in the city. Opened in July 1886, the venue was recorded as being 40 ft × 100 ft (12 m × 30 m) in size and was to be of mixed-use for a theater and as a town hall. A stage for performances was added in early 1887.

== Tynan Opera House (1889) ==
Tynan Opera House
- Barrett Opera House
- Interactive map of Tynan Opera House
- Former names: Motter & Stephens Building, Hotel Savoy, Crowley apartment house, Chehalis Apartments
- Address: Main Street and Chehalis Avenue
- Coordinates: 46°39′40.7″N 122°58′10.5″W
- Owner: Eliza Tynan Saunders Barrett
- Production: Live musical and theater performances

Construction
- Built: 1889
- Opened: November 1889
- Closed: January 1907
- Demolished: 1940s

The Tynan Opera House was a music hall built by Chehalis' founding member, Eliza Tynan Saunders Barrett, and opened in November 1889. Also referred to as the Barrett Opera House and for a time in the 1890s as the Rainier Hotel, the $6,000 theater was located in what was then the city's downtown at the southeast corner of Main Street and Chehalis Avenue.

A thanksgiving ball, part of a citywide celebration to honor the growth and prosperity of Chehalis, was held at the Tynan in 1890. The opera house was used for several political events, including as a primary in 1890 and as a convention hall in 1892 to elect delegates and produce nominees for the state legislature and governor. A large fire in December 1894 caused $2,500 damages to the Tynan.

The first commencement ceremony under the city's school district was held at the theater in May 1893; there were four graduates, all women. In December 1897 and into early 1898, it was temporarily converted into a roller skating rink, possibly the first such venue in the city. In the aftereffects of the Spanish-American War, the opera was leased in 1899 as a headquarters and training area for the military. The stage was removed but the auditorium was open in the evenings for patrons.

The opera house struggled within a few years after opening. Due to a combination of factors, including a large fire in 1892, (Note: The fire led to the downtown district migrating to a new city center on Market Street.) 1894 fire, and Eliza's death in 1900, the opera house began being overlooked and was often rented out for other uses. The Tynan was listed for sale, along with the remaining block under Barrett's ownership, in August 1899 and the venue leased in late-1900 to the Chehalis high school athletic squad for basketball practice, starting a trend that future theaters in the city would experience in the early 20th century, The floor of the opera house was used as a staging area to put together a hot air balloon that floated over the city in 1904.

After Eliza's death, the ownership of the Tynan Opera House was transferred to J.H. Horst by July 1901. He sold the building in November 1906 for $2,500, as well as the scenery used in the productions. The new owners, after having the building declared as condemned, planned to convert the structure into a rooming house. The theatrical performances of the Tynan ceased and by January 1907, the upper floor had been converted into a rink, with future intentions to include a gymnasium.

By summer of that year, the conversion of the theater to a rooming house began. Being referred to as a hotel, it became known as the Motter & Stephens Building. A third floor was installed and the foundation repaired. It was noted during the remodel that the Tynan was originally built well and had deteriorated very little. New ownership in 1913 made additional upgrades, including the addition of steel cladding to the exterior, and the building was renamed the Hotel Savoy. A fire in April 1915, declared as arson, caused less than $1,000 in total damages, but decades of remodeling, including the new cladding, limited the fire department's ability to quickly put out the flames.

The building that was the Tynan Opera House was continually used as a hotel and boarding house, existing under names such as the Crowley apartment house in the 1920s and then eventually as the Chehalis Apartments. Used briefly as a grocery store as well, the structure existed until the 1940s when it was demolished, approximately in 1950, as it was in a state of disrepair. As of 2024, the grounds of the Tynan Opera House are occupied by the Lewis County Law and Justice Center.

== Brunswig Grand Opera House (1895) ==
Brunswig Grand Opera House
- Chehalis Opera House
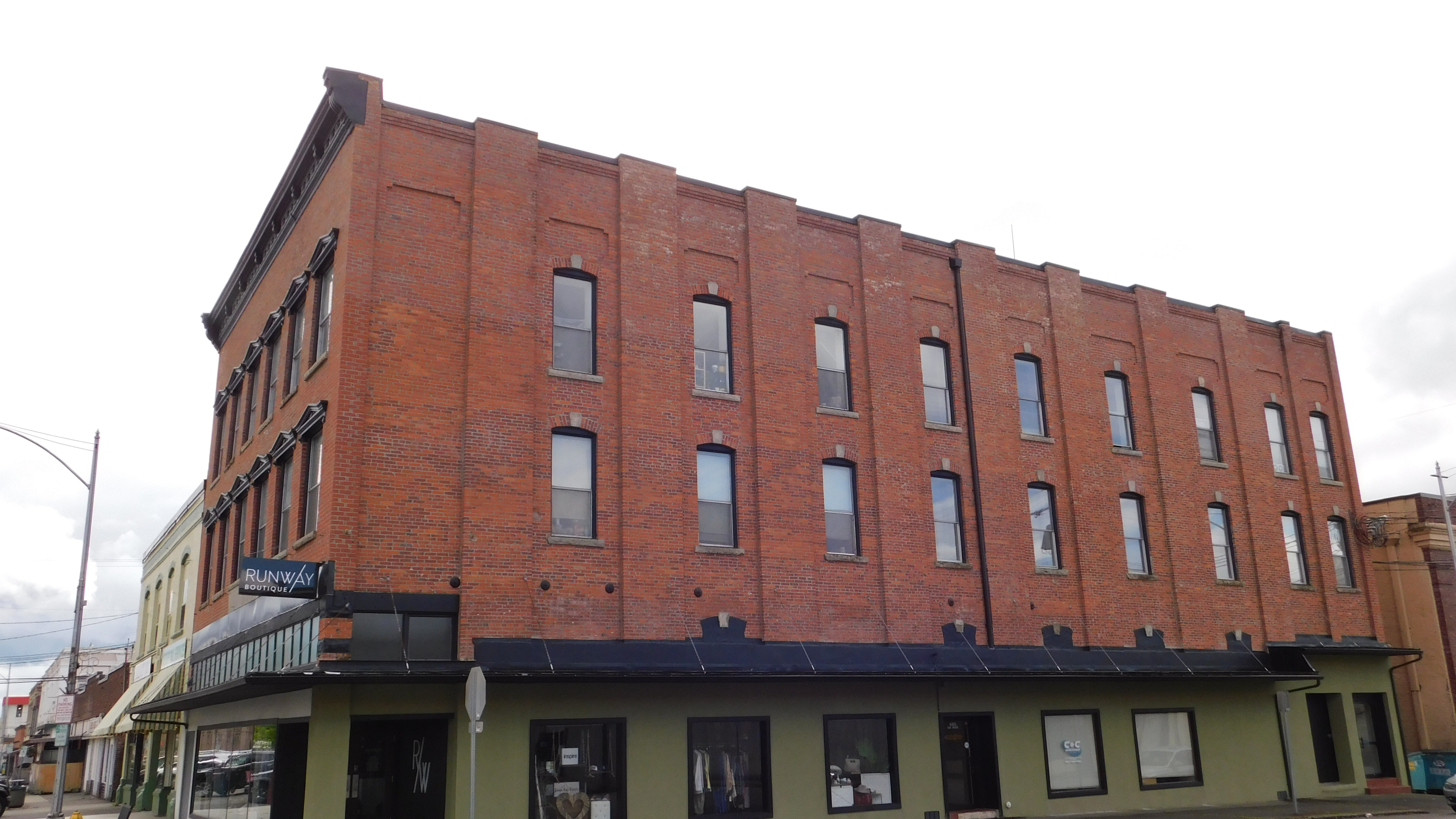
- Former site of the Brunswig Grand Theater
- Interactive map of Brunswig Grand Opera House
- Former names: Brunswig Hotel, Fink Building
- Address: 383 N.W. Chehalis Avenue
- Coordinates: 46°39′50.32″N 122°58′13.14″W
- Owner: William Brunswig
- Capacity: 600
- Current use: Apartments, commercial use
- Production: Live musical and theater performances, burlesque, vaudeville, ceremonies

Construction
- Built: 1895
- Opened: 1895
- Closed: 1908

William Brunswig, a Chehalis businessman, built and opened The Grand Opera House in 1895 and the space was often referred to as the Chehalis Opera House, or more simply as "the opera house". It was located on Chehalis Avenue at the intersection of Park Street. and is considered the oldest building on the street. A mercantile store, named The Racket Store for unknown reasons, was situated on the ground floor and the opera space, a vaudeville stage, existed on the second floor and accessed by a stairwell porch on the side of the building.

Admission rates for the electrically lighted theater in 1899 were listed in a range between 25 and 75 cents. The venue had a seating capacity of 600 and a 25 foot (7.6 m)-wide stage, with floodlights and loft rigging.

In its early days of operation, the venue hosted concerts, graduations, and Grand Army of the Republic ceremonies. A roller rink was opened at the Grand by 1898; two-wheel bicycle skates were noted to be used. The opera house was often used for political rallies, speeches, or conventions and maintained a band, referred to as the Chehalis Orchestra. In January 1904, the city recommended that the building undergo safety improvements and a funeral for a founding member of Chehalis, Amanda Miller, was held at the theater the same month. The year brought competition with The New Grand Opera House which began hosting larger, more popular events. The original Grand attempted to counter the upstart at times with the staging of minstrel shows.

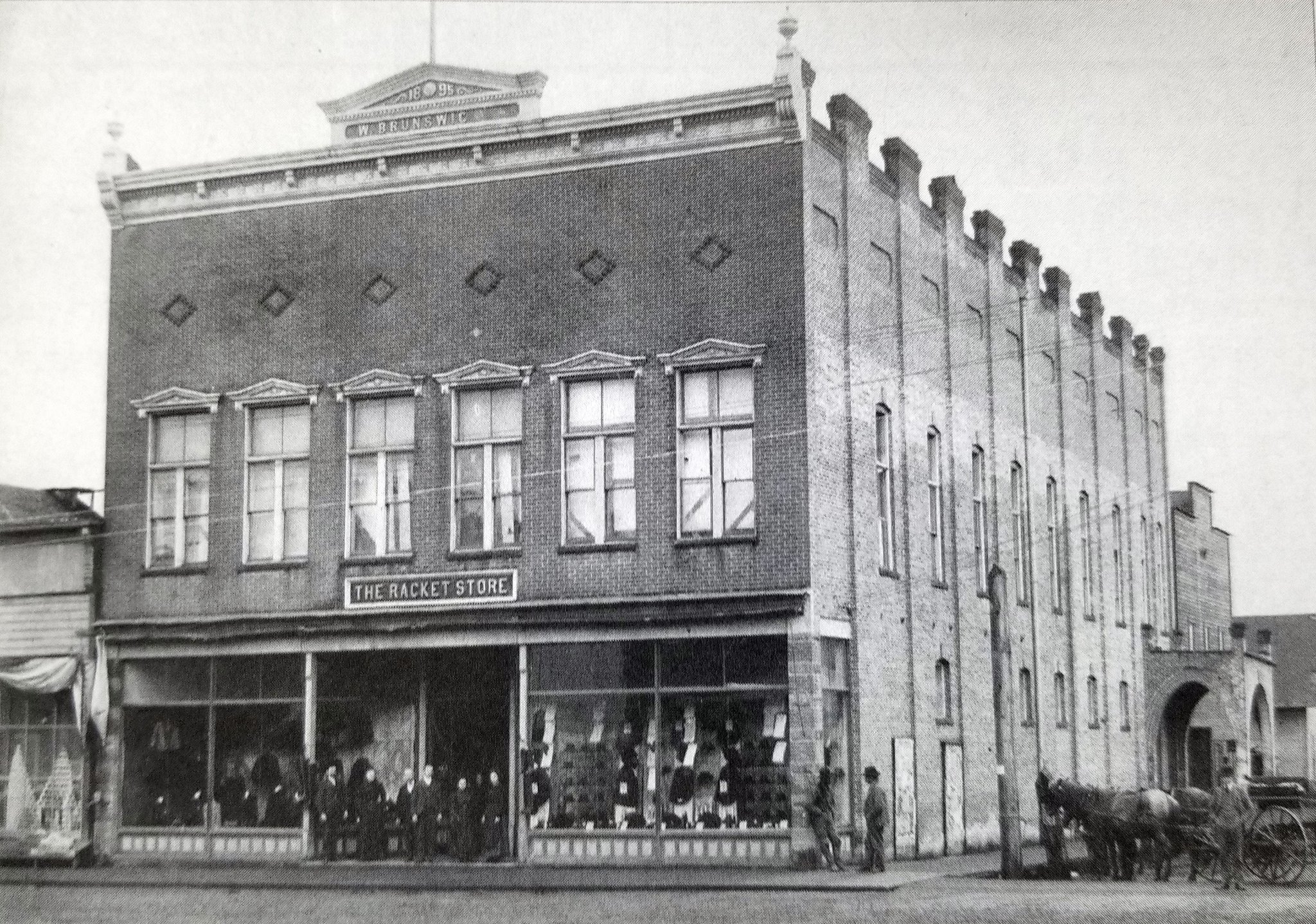
Brunswig Building, ca. 1900

In June 1905, John L. Sullivan, a heavyweight boxing champion, held the stage at the Grand and during his monologue, $100 was offered for an attendee to fight Jim McCormick, another boxer from the production. Despite some banter and promises, no actual battle ensued, but Sullivan and McCormick went four rounds for the audience. The fight was deemed as having, "nothing to them". By April 1906, the Grand was reopened under new management, offering a limited summer-run as a burlesque and vaudeville house charging 10 to 15 cents per show. Following engagements were sparse afterwards, but an inaugural Halloween masquerade ball organized by a local chapter of the Independent Order of Odd Fellows was held in October the following year.

In May 1907, the theater suffered minor damages to its building and some loss to its wardrobe room when an accidental fire at a restaurant spread to the venue. No injuries were reported at the Grand but two children perished in rooms above the dining establishment. On November 1, 1907, Brunswig officially announced an upcoming closure of the Grand Opera House noting that the theater was not profitable. There were no immediate plans for the building and the closure temporarily left the city without an operating theater. Concerts and balls were held sporadically for several months after. High school productions were held into the summer of 1908. Early remodeling of the upper floors began in March 1909 and by May, the opera house was reported as having been closed for approximately one year with Brunswig announcing extensive remodeling of the auditorium. Measured at a cost of $12,000, the building was split into two floors with commercial space opened on the lower floor. The opera house eventually became a hotel known as the Brunswig Hotel and was referred to as the Fink Building after a later change of ownership. As of 2024, the Brunswig building stands at 383 N.W. Chehalis Avenue.

== Geissler Opera House and New Grand Opera House (1903) ==
New Grand Opera House
- Geissler Opera House
- Interactive map of New Grand Opera House
- Address: Market Street
- Coordinates: 46°39′56.304″N 122°58′14.412″W
- Owner: George Geissler
- Production: Live musical and theater performances, ceremonies, film

Construction
- Built: 1902—1903
- Opened: December 24, 1903
- Closed: February 2, 1905
- Demolished: April 1905

A local businessman, George Geissler, built a two-story, 50 ft × 120 ft (15 m × 37 m) brick theater on Market Street in the city's new downtown district. Announced in February 1902 and to be built of locally quarried stone, the Geissler Opera House, as it became known, began to be constructed in April 1902. The theater, located next to the Rainier Hotel, became part of the eventual site of the Dream, Peacock, and Grand Theaters at the Hotel Washington. Early plans included the theater to operate on the first floor with a ceiling height of 40 feet (12.2 m) and containing a stage measuring 30 feet (9.1 m) deep and 50 feet (15.2 m) wide. Construction continued until late 1903 and the stage slightly shortened by two feet. Opera-style chairs, box seating, and a pit for an orchestra were added, and the building space outfitted with Hessian fabric, a cloak room, and underground dressing rooms with indoor plumbing. The Geissler Opera House opened on December 24, 1903, hosting a Christmas Eve ball at a $1.00 admission.

The new opera house opened with a large calendar of productions, including amateur plays, orchestral and dance performances, and the annual Knights of Pythias New Year's Eve ball. In an age of concern over theater fires, Geissler promoted, in January 1904, that the asbestos ceiling and curtain were fireproof and that he had installed a firehose that could reach the entire theater space. The announcement was the first mention referring to the opera house as the "New Grand". Along with the Brunswig Opera House, the city recommended safety improvements to the building later that month. In April, The New Grand Opera House unveiled a painted curtain containing a scene of Mt. St. Helens and Spirit Lake and was considered "the most picturesque" in the northwest.

The venue was utilized for two conventions for delegates and nominees to the state legislature in May 1904. The auditorium continued to book acts and host a full schedule that year, hosting the Woodmen of the World, female band performances, grand balls, and productions by the Edison Electric Shows. The site was once again used for politics, hosting in September a Democratic county convention and a Republican campaign opening with speaker Francis W. Cushman, a state U.S. Representative. The full slate of events led the Geissler Opera House to outcompete the original Grand.

The first moving picture recorded as being shown in Chehalis was at the New Grand in mid-November 1904. The silent film, an Edison Studios production, was "In the Hills of Old Carolina". A newspaper account remarked that the movie would be popular once "the public gets a little better acquainted with what is going on". The early successes of the New Grand did not last and the opera house reported low attendance numbers.

On the morning of February 2, 1905, the Geissler Opera House caught fire when flames spread from a millinery shop in the building. Geissler was on hand during the two-hour fire, helping firemen breach the building but a stuck valve on a water hose prevented an immediate cessation of the fire. The flames entered the theater space and it began to engulf nearby buildings. The opera house suffered catastrophic damages calculated to be $5,000. (Note: Early newspaper accounts of the Geissler Opera House fire varied wildly in the reporting of estimated financial losses, with assessments listed between $20,000 and $50,000.) During the fire, Geissler became involved in a physical confrontation with William Brunswig, the Grand Opera owner; both suffered blows to the face. The fire was large enough to be seen from Centralia.

After several of Geissler's insurance claims were settled in the following months, he had not determined if he would rebuild the theater or repurpose the lot for a different venture; by April, he sold the remaining chairs and scenery. Geissler began removing the burned debris of the New Grand and the lot was traded to eventual Dream Theater owner, J.D. Rice, in May. The land rebuilt and the new building used as a mixed grocery and dry goods store.

Geissler used his claim payouts to make a large purchase of a lot across from the St. Helens Hotel with plans to build a fire wall on the property and considered modeling the first floor for use as an opera space; it became a dance hall after completion, opening in February 1906. After the opening, Geissler wrote an editorial in February 1906 blaming the city's water system and firefighting services for the loss of the New Grand Opera House.

== The Orpheum (1907) ==
The Orpheum Theater
- The House of Features
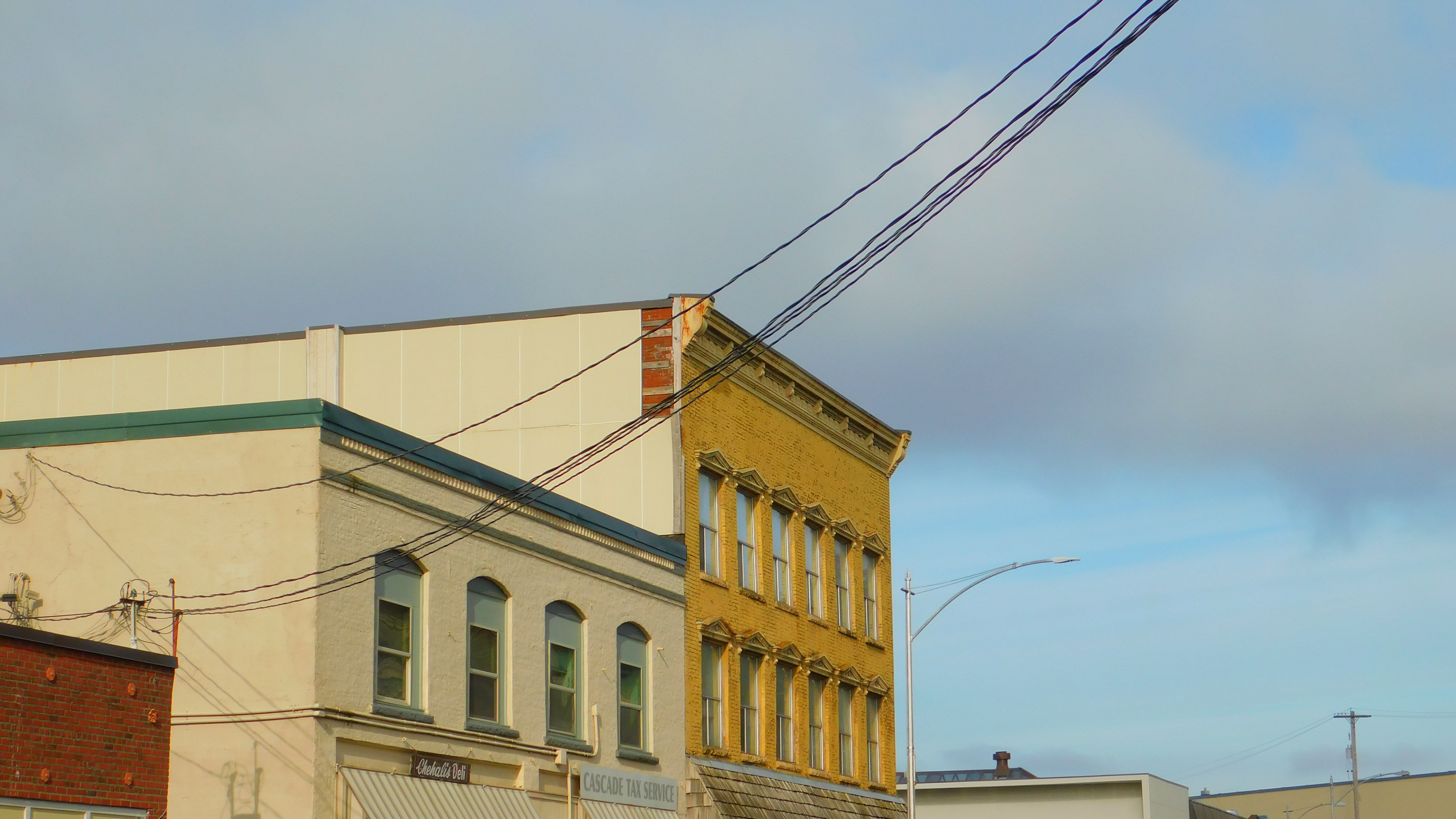
- Former home of the Orpheum, building to the left
- Interactive map of The Orpheum Theater
- Former names: John West Building
- Address: 361 NW Chehalis Avenue
- Coordinates: 46°39′49.8996″N 122°58′13.1628″W
- Owner: Harrison Wheeler
- Seating type: Folding chairs
- Screen: 1
- Production: Silent film, vaudeville

Construction
- Opened: November 13, 1907
- Closed: March 1912

The Orpheum Theater, given the moniker "The House of Features", was located in the John West Building in downtown Chehalis. It began operations on November 13, 1907, with the intent to provide films specifically for women and children, relying on independent movies, and charging an admission rate of 10 cents. Sound was supplemented by the use of an Auxetophone and the theater also provided vaudeville acts. The entrance was remodeled in late 1908 and again in 1909 when the business was sold. The additional renovations undertaken included an electric sign and the installation of a hand-painted curtain of Mt. St. Helens. By the end of 1909, the theater introduced a new steel arch entry and folding chairs for the audience, and upgraded the backdrop by installing a radium curtain. Improvements for fire safety were undertaken in 1910, and the movie house billed itself as showing "clean and moral" productions and using non-flammable film.

Due to a lack of space combined with growing demand, the theater owner, Harrison Wheeler, went under contract for a new building to expand the Orpheum but the move did not occur and the Orpheum remained in its original location. Wheeler, already managing the Dream Theater, then undertook a further expansion of his movie theater business by leasing out a newly built, one-story theater on Market Street that was to be separate from the Orpheum. It became known as the Bell Theater and customers received a 5-cent coupon to the Orpheum when they attended the new venue.

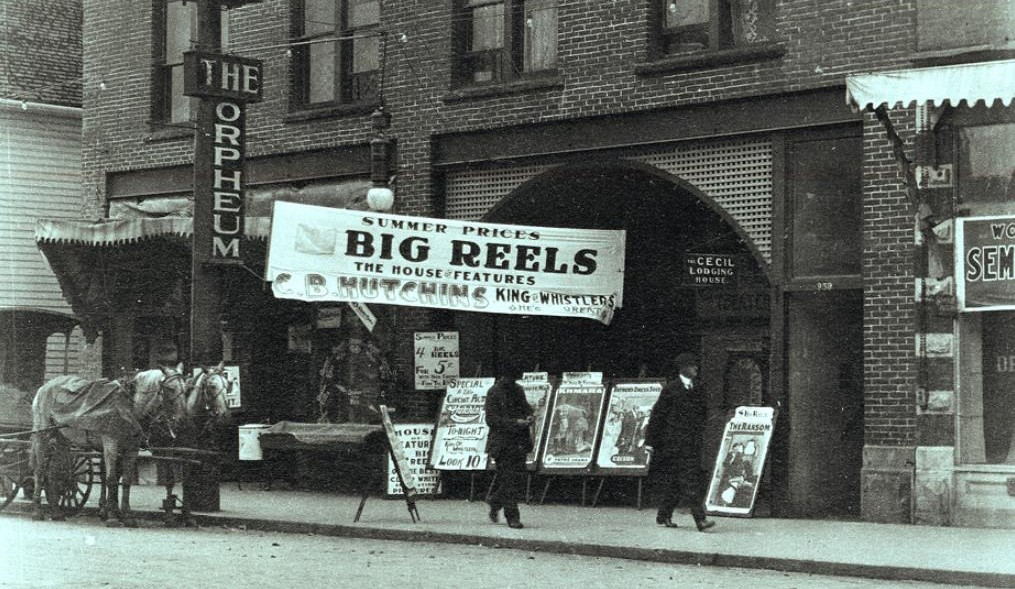
The "House of Features", the Orpheum Theater, ca. 1910

The Orpheum, the first official venue in Chehalis meant for the showing of films, closed in March 1912 despite the appetite for movies in the city and its own need for expansion. Wheeler, in competition of his own making with the Bell and Dream theaters, was also overworked due to his commitments with movie houses in Yakima, Washington, and could no longer keep the Orpheum open. A candy manufacturer moved into the Orpheum Theater space later that month. In 1913, the location was remodeled and became the home of the Empress Theater.

== The Vaudette (1908) ==
The Vaudette was a short-lived movie house, existing for five months from late 1908 to early 1909. Charging a ten-cent admission, the theater was part of a regional branch of theaters and provided opera-style seating.

== Glide Theater (1908) ==
The Glide Theater
- The Glide
- Interactive map of The Glide Theater
- Address: Park Avenue and Center Street
- Coordinates: 46°39′45.6804″N 122°58′8.418″W
- Screen: 1
- Production: Roller skating, theater and opera performances, film, vaudeville, sports

Construction
- Opened: December 31, 1908
- Closed: January 1917

The Glide Theater was originally a roller skating rink that opened on New Year's Eve, 1908, with a masquerade ball. The maple rink and dance floor was 80 ft × 100 ft (24 m × 30 m). Known simply as "The Glide", it was located at the intersection of Pacific Avenue and Center Street. The interest in roller skating in the city led the Glide to record large attendances and as such, was suspected to be the leading cause of the closing of the Vaudette Theater. Similar to other theaters in Chehalis at the time, the rink also hosted basketball games and vaudeville, and there was an early, opera-style conversion to the building in 1909 so the venue could support live theater performances; it included the build of a 28 foot (8.5 metres) stage. By the end of that year, a deputy was hired to keep order at the rink.

The first moving picture to be shown at The Glide was in the summer of 1909; it was a recording of a Papke-Ketchel prizefight. The theater was upgraded to also be used as a cinema in 1910 while continuing to host vaudeville and operas. The Glide hosted a minstrel show featuring ballplayers from the Chehalis Gophers and was wired to broadcast the Jack Johnson vs. James J. Jeffries fight in 1910. It was converted back into a skating rink during the winter months. A fire in 1911 destroyed a $3,000 newly installed electric organ and in the summer, the rink was used for an "anti-Greek and Italian" meeting, a movement in the city to prevent and abolish employment of foreigners. A meeting to discuss the settlement of tribal lands of the Cowlitz Indian Tribe was held the following summer at the Glide, and was attended by over 200 tribal members. The rink would also be used, due to its size, for political conventions and gatherings.

The Glide was often used for various sporting events and needs. Beginning in 1911, the theater was used as a basketball court for the Chehalis high school boys team for several years. Wrestling and boxing matches were also held at the theater. The Glide, starting in 1914, was utilized as a gymnasium during the school week for young people, particularly Chehalis high school students. Showers and basketball equipment were installed.

By 1915, the theater changed ownership but remained operational as a skating rink. In 1916, the venue was host to the creation of the People's Independent Party, a political group meant to oust leaders, particularly those in judicial roles, in Lewis County, Washington. The Glide ceased to exist by January 1917, bought out to become an automobile repair garage. The rink floor and the opera-style additions were removed.

== The Dream Theater (1911) ==
The Dream Theater
- The Dream
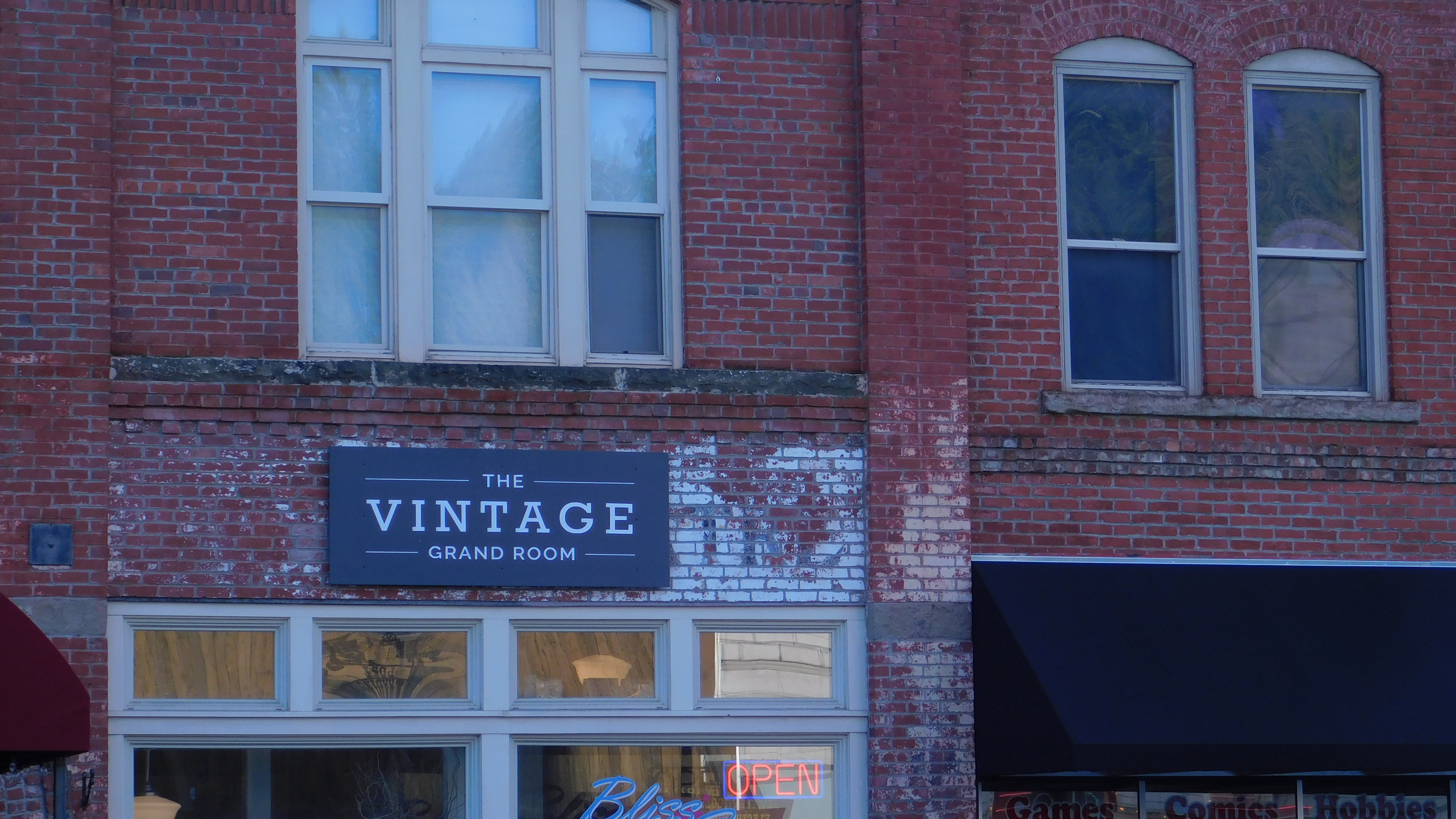
- Ghost sign for the Dream Theater, 2021
- Interactive map of The Dream Theater
- Former names: Gem Theater, Liberty Theater
- Address: 545 N Market Blvd.
- Coordinates: 46°39′55.8576″N 122°58′14.9412″W
- Owner: J.D. Rice, Twin City Theatre Company, United Theatres Company
- Seating type: opera-style
- Capacity: 400
- Screen: 1
- Production: Silent film, vaudeville, live musical performances

Construction
- Opened: January 1911
- Renovated: 1912, 1913, 1926
- Closed: early 1930

The Dream Theater was originally meant to be an expansion of the Orpheum but became a new theater in its own right. The two-story building that was home to the theater was erected solely for the purpose as a new opera house and had a 50 ft × 100 ft (15 m × 30 m) footprint. Located in the historic Hotel Washington on Market Street, the new movie house was intended to be called the Gem Theater. It was built with an asbestos-lined ceiling and a rear exit, both early concerns about fire safety at the time, and had an occupancy of 400. A retreating lobby to the hotel, still in existence as of 2024, was put in place during the build. The name was changed and it became known succinctly as "The Dream".

The theater opened in January 1911 with a showing of 4,000 feet (1,219.2 m) of film backed by a four-piece orchestra. It featured a large number of globe lights at its entrance, had opera-style seating, the building was steam-heated, and boasted of being fireproof, modern touches and concerns of the era. Original admission was listed as between 5 and 15 cents. By the end of its first year, The Dream partnered with the Cyclohomo Amusement Company and, in 1912, a small enlargement of the theater space was begun; additional electric globe lighting was installed in 1913. The Dream hosted vaudeville and live musical performances, and once held a competition to capture a greased pig.

The venue was threatened with the loss of its license in 1914 after several notices of disturbance were brought forth by the Hotel Washington due to the noise level of the electric organ in the theater. In 1915, the theater owner since its inception, J.D. Rice, began operating the Bell Theater in association with The Dream. Later that year in December, a Ford automobile was assembled in the theater by a service crew from the local St. John's Garage. A common event held by Ford at the time to showcase the ease of build of its vehicles, the competition took two minutes and 44 seconds, breaking a Seattle crew record. A performance by the renowned dancing couple, Vernon and Irene Castle, took place at The Dream in 1916.

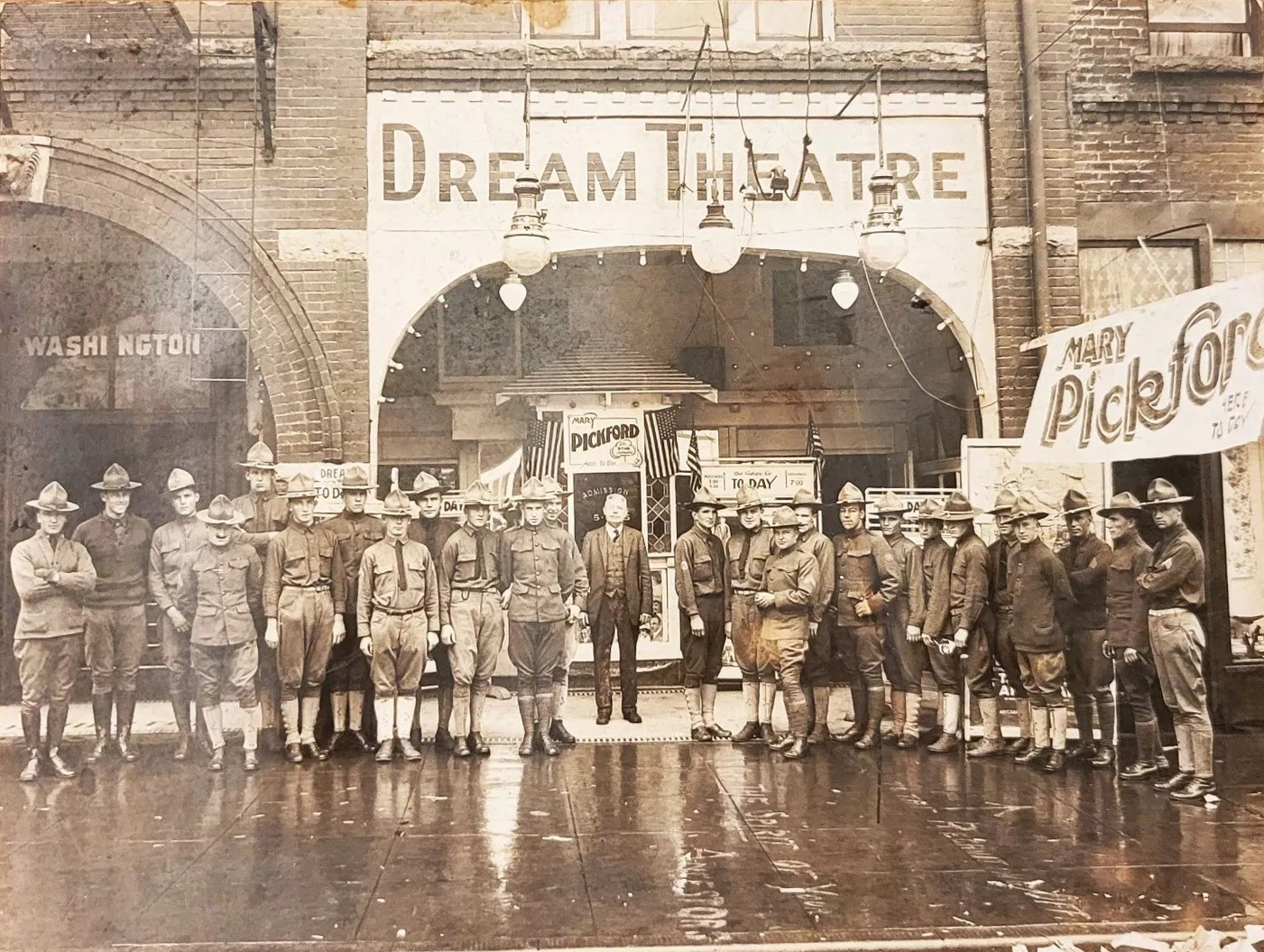
Dream Theatre, Chehalis, 1917

In 1917 and 1918, the theater contracted, for $4,000 and over $5,000 respectively, to show films exclusively by Artcraft and Paramount Pictures. The movie house shut down for several weeks during 1918 due to the 1918–1920 flu pandemic. Seeing that the entertainment economy of the city and The Dream could expand, Rice purchased a lot in 1919 with the intent to build a new structure to be of exclusive use for a theater, but the project languished and eventually became an auto garage. Admission rates in the early 1920s were listed as 5 or 15 cents.

Rice faced several lawsuits and legal troubles during his run as proprietor of The Dream. He pled guilty to paying Lillie Larson, a woman ticket seller at the movie house, significantly less than minimum wage in 1916 and admitted before a city commission in 1919 that he broke an ordinance by seating patrons in the aisle during an overflow showing. Along with several other theater owners in the region, he faced a copyright lawsuit in 1920, specifically for playing the song, "Let The Rest Of The World Go By", at The Dream.

In 1926, after the loss of the Liberty Theater to a fire, the Dream Theater changed ownership and renamed itself the Liberty Theater. The electric sign that adorned the lost Liberty playhouse was moved to The Dream's location and became the new marquee. In 1927, under the ownership of the Twin City Theatres Company, (Note: The Twin City Theatres Corporation was formed shortly before the loss of Centralia's Grand Theatre to fire in April 1924 by local movie venue owners A. F. Cormier, Frank A. Graham, and E. T. Robinson. The company's formation allowed for a monopoly of the remaining movies houses in the two cities.) The Dream, along with the St. Helens Theater, was part of a $1.0 million United Theatres Company contract to purchase local and regional movie houses.

After the sale, The Dream closed in 1930 due in part to competition from Centralia's new Fox Theater and the space remained unoccupied until the end of the year when a new venture, the Peacock Theater, planned to open after extensive remodeling.

As of 2023, a ghost sign of the Dream Theater is visible on the front entrance side of the Hotel Washington.

== The Bell Theater (1911) ==
The Bell Theater
- The House of Good Shows
- Interactive map of The Bell Theater
- Former names: People's Theater
- Address: 534 N Market Blvd
- Coordinates: 46°39′57.0132″N 122°58′12.774″W
- Owner: Harrison Wheeler, W.H. Twiss
- Screen: 1
- Production: Silent film, vaudeville, live musical and comedy performances

Construction
- Opened: February 20, 1911
- Renovated: minor annual remodeling
- Expanded: autumn 1911
- Closed: March 1916

The Bell Theater, originally a planned expansion of the Orpheum, was a brand-new, one-story theater on Market Street opposite the Dream Theater. A coupon redemption between the Bell and Orpheum allowed a 5-cent discount to the Orpheum when customers attended the Bell.

The Bell opened on February 20, 1911. With admissions listed at 10 cents for children, 15 cents for adults, patrons enjoyed opera-style seating. The ceiling was covered in metal decor and the venue owners, the Wheeler family, boasted of fire exits and two acts to be performed each evening. The first acts were a comedic performance by the pair known as "Bell and DeBell" and a juggler under the moniker, "Dalbenie". By the next month, Wheeler, who promised to run a clean theater, allowed an act deemed "little less than vulgar" to perform, though only once. The Bell, afterwards, was given the motto, "The House of Good Shows". Wheeler advertised that the Bell and the Orpheum were capable of running a variety of film productions, including Edison, Pathé, and Vitagrapgh. Similar to other playhouses in the city, the Bell provided vaudeville acts but by autumn of 1911, the venue changed its programming exclusively to movies and musical comedy acts and the building footprint was slightly increased and the stage enlarged to accompany this change.

After the closure of the Orpheum in 1912, Wheeler was to continue to own the Bell but sold his position to a new owner who promised renovations and a return of vaudeville. In 1913, the Bell underwent several changes regarding ownership, partners, contracts, and management. The theater building was sold in April to W.H. Twiss, who owned it until its end, and he planned to make improvements, A week later, management oversight was given to J.D. Rice, owner of The Dream, and he added additional lighting for signage, similar to his upgrades at The Dream. In November, a new owner of the theater's productions, Arthur Winstock, reopened the Bell after some remodeling and renamed the venue as the People's Theater. Vaudeville and moving pictures were announced as the programming, with admissions spanning from to ten to thirty cents. Within six weeks, Winstock married Isla Rolsom, the Bell's ticket seller, and then absconded from the city without her, having paid little of his debts or promises regarding the People's Theater. The Bell restarted operations soon thereafter, and resumed using its original name.

With the Bell running smoothly after the difficult year, a contract to show films by the Famous Players Film Company was reached in early 1914. The deal was considered the most expensive in Chehalis at the time. After receiving permission from the city police commissioner, the Bell was allowed to show a film about forced prostitution, Traffic in Souls, in the summer. Management changed once again. Overtaking from Mr. T.C. Grindley in mid-1914, the new production owners, Proffitt and McDevitt, stated their intentions to improve the lighting and make upgrades to the curtain and machinery. In October, the Bell held a raffle in conjunction with the Central Theater in Centralia to give away several prizes, including a 1915 Buick, as wells as diamonds, which were offered specifically to entice women and girls to participate. One winner received the right to donate a Kimball organ to a place of their choosing.

In early 1915, the Bell underwent new management by the Brin theater chain, who also owned the Central. Similar to previous overseers, renovations were announced. A small fire that was deemed arson, and connected to other mysterious fires in the downtown business district, took place at the Bell in late January 1916. Causing minor damage totaling between $50 and $100, the stage was charred and some scenery and seating, which had been intentionally piled, was found smoldering. The scenery, unbeknownst to the arsonist, had been painted with fireproof paint.

The theater flooded in March 1916, leading to the Bell's pit and stage areas, as well as several rows of seats, to be submerged in water. The flooding, suspected to be caused by a failure of a pump, was severe enough to come within 15 feet (4.6 m) of the entrance doors despite the inclined floor. The owner, Twiss, made repairs but suggested he would turn the building into a business store instead. By July, the building was partially rented out to a bicycle and motorcycle repair shop. The repair shop bought out the Twiss interest in January 1917, which had by that time rented out space to a tailoring business.

== Liederkranz Hall and Chehalis Auditorium (1912) ==
Liederkranz Hall
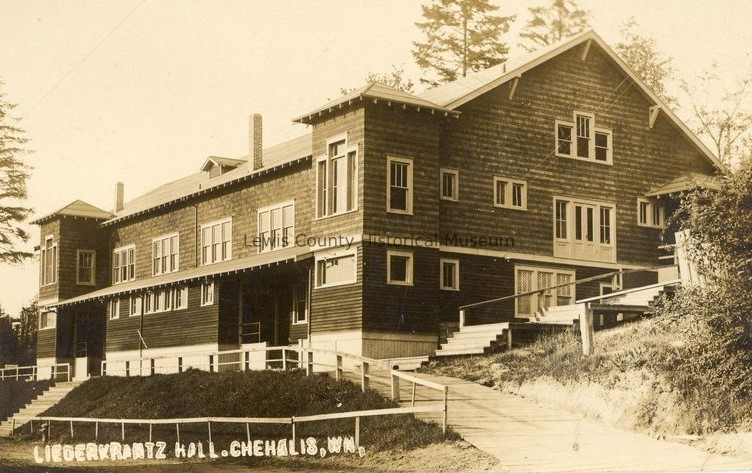
- Leiderkranz Hall,ca. 1917
- Interactive map of Liederkranz Hall
- Former names: Chehalis Auditorium, Liberty Hall
- Address: National Avenue
- Coordinates: 46°40′15.4″N 122°58′14.9″W (Note: The location of the Liederkranz Hall is approximate, based on the source material.)
- Owner: Chehalis Liederkranz Society
- Capacity: 500
- Production: Live musical and theater performances, balls, ceremonies

Construction
- Opened: October 19, 192
- Closed: August 1918
- Demolished: February 1926 (fire)

The Chehalis Liederkranz was a German social society known in the city during the early 20th century for performing concerts and choral presentations at the New Grand Opera House and the Glide Theater, and holding its own annual masquerade ball. The Liederkranz, translated as "Garlands of Song", purchased land in late 1911 on National Avenue, north of the downtown area in the foundry and coal district. The property was once the home of the Chehalis Band Park which still contained a grandstand and a sparingly used hall.

In early 1912, the organization announced plans to build a mixed-use theater and hall on the property. Built with a covered entranceway for automobiles, a new convenience of the era, the original plans were for a 5,000 square feet (460 m^{2}) second floor auditorium with an occupancy of 500. The stage was reported as measuring between 25 ft × 31 ft (7.6 m × 9.4 m) and 28 ft × 31 ft (8.5 m × 9.4 m), and unlike other theaters in the city, the dressing rooms were located next to the stage. Rather than rely on membership dues, or raise money via subscription which was common at the time, the Liederkranz held concerts and balls to collect monies for the new building. A large banquet opened the Liederkranz Hall on October 19, 1912. Constructed at a cost of $15,000, the opera house and dance hall's theater space was listed as 4,500 square feet (420 m^{2}) and contained elaborate furnishings.

The hall achieved immediate success, procuring the city's annual Knight of Pythias dance for several years, and hosting popular musical acts such as the quartet group, The Strollers, and the tenor, Sebastian Burnett. The society continued to use the hall to host its annual ball.

At the beginning of the United States' involvement in World War I, the German club held benefit fundraisers for a local military company stationed in Centralia and hosted governor, Ernest Lister, who addressed members of the city in regards to the war. As part of the war effort to raise funds, the violinist, Maud Powell, performed at the Liederkranz Hall in January 1918.

In late April of that year, a local citizen's club requested that the Liederkranz Hall's name be changed. Speaking on behalf of members in the community, the club deemed the moniker as being "too German" and "obnoxious". Two weeks later, the hall's name was officially changed to the Chehalis Auditorium. In the weeks afterwards, programs held at the renamed hall were a fundraiser for a local chapter of the Red Cross. and a Decoration Day celebration.

In August 1918, the Chehalis Auditorium was sold and plans were to move the hall to the city's downtown and have it converted into a public meeting hall. The move did not happen as a destructive fire, declared as most likely arson, occurred a week later. The old hall, renamed the Liberty Hall after the sale, fell into decay. The Liederkranz society disbanded but was revived as a touring group in 1925. The building, renamed as the Del Monte Hall, suffered a fire in March 1925 and was condemned and destroyed completely after another fire in February 1926.

== The Empress and Liberty Theaters (1913) ==
The Liberty Theater
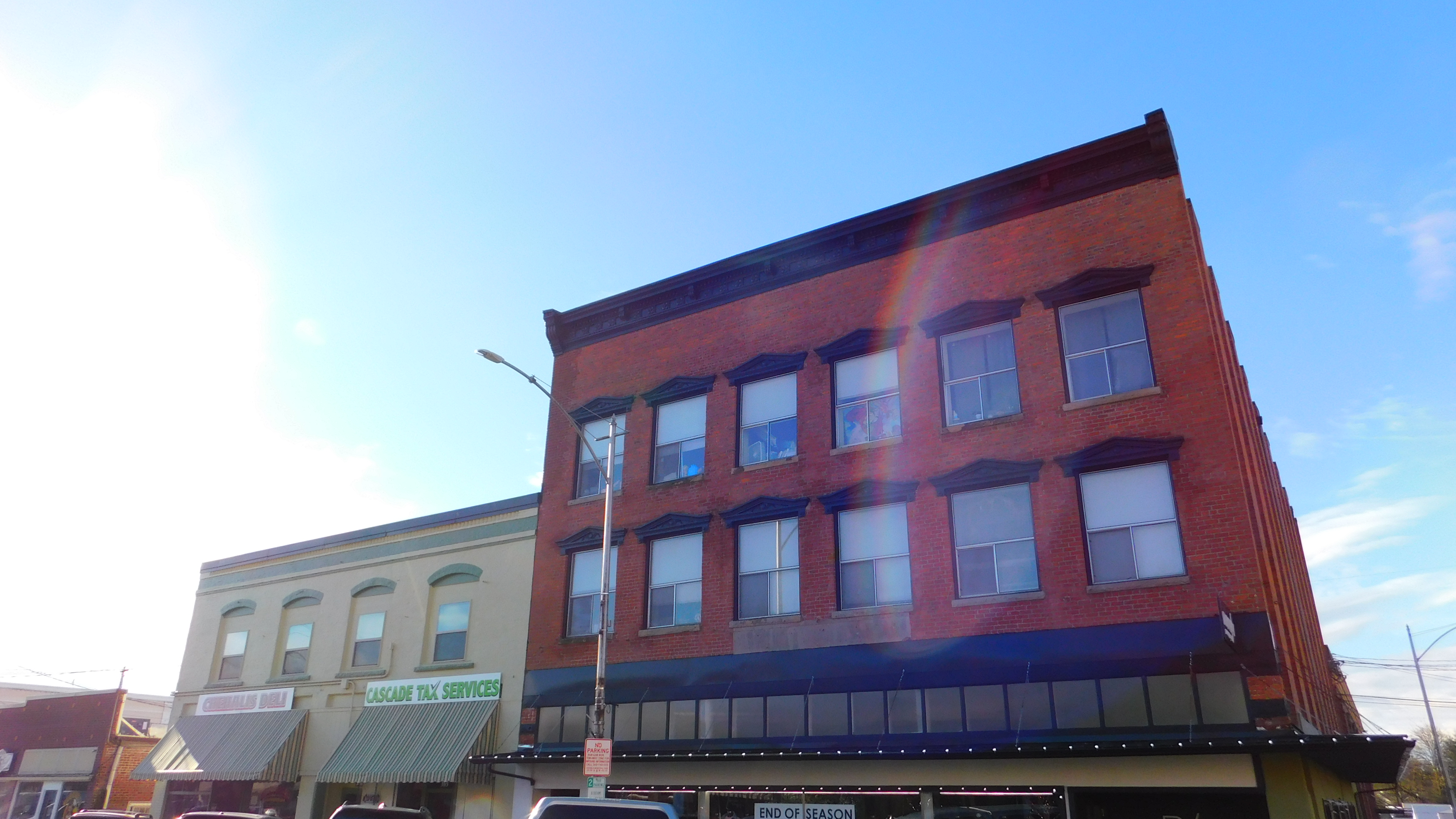
- The Liberty Theater location, building on the left
- Interactive map of The Liberty Theater
- Former names: The Empress Theater, Orpheum Theater, John West Building,
- Address: 361 NW Chehalis Avenue
- Coordinates: 46°39′49.8996″N 122°58′13.1628″W
- Owner: Twin City Theatres Corporation
- Seating type: Opera-style
- Capacity: 500
- Screen: 1
- Production: Silent film, photoplays, live musical performances

Construction
- Opened: October 10, 1913; July 11, 1918
- Renovated: 1918, 1920
- Closed: July 1926 (fire)

The Empress opened on October 10, 1913 at the location of the old Orpheum Theater. The building was remodeled with a new backdrop, advanced film machinery, and was upgraded to include opera-style seating. Before the opening, the owners held a naming contest for the new playhouse, geared specifically for Chehalis women to participate; the moniker, The Empress, was chosen. The proprietors charged ten-cents and it was an entertainment venue for silent film, photoplays, and live music.

The showing of the 1916 film, Purity, led to a threat of a warrant after the movie was deemed immoral; the Empress did not present the film further. A Kimball two-manual pipe organ, built by the Johnson Pipe Company of Los Angeles, was installed in 1917.

In 1918, the Empress Theater name was changed in favor of the New Liberty Theater during a renovation. The viewing area was enlarged after the upper story of the building was torn out to provide a balcony for an opera-style arrangement. The occupancy was increased to 500, which included spring cushioned seating, considered modern at the time. Installed during the renovation was an intricate, coordinated lighting system and the remodeled movie house was noted for its colored glass panels and stucco reliefs. Equipped in the new theater was a $5,000 pipe organ and the ceilings were built in a fashion to highlight the sound. The name shortened to the Liberty Theater, it officially reopened on July 11, 1918, with ownership eventually transferring to a local movie house business, the Twin City Theatres Corporation. In 1920, an advanced electric heating system was installed and the organ was renovated with additional pipes.

The Liberty remained in operation until the summer of 1926, when it was destroyed in a fire. The fire began around midnight on July 19 and was believed to be of "incendiary origin". The disaster was a combined loss of $13,500 to the theater itself and the building, including destruction of the pipe organ. Less than a month later, the Twin City Theater Company decided not to rebuild the Liberty Theater and the owner of the structure, Chehalis mayor John West, converted the building into a combined lodge and business store. The lighted marquee was moved to the Dream Theater that September, and The Dream was renamed the Liberty.

== Peacock and Grand Theaters (1931) ==
Peacock Theater
- The Grand
- Interactive map of Peacock Theater
- Former names: Grand Theater, Dream Theater
- Address: 545 N Market Blvd.
- Coordinates: 46°39′55.8576″N 122°58′14.9412″W
- Owner: Peacock family, Twin City Theatre Company
- Capacity: 284
- Screen: 1
- Record attendance: 500
- Production: Film

Construction
- Opened: January 3, 1931
- Renovated: 1933
- Closed: 1940

The Peacock Theater, named after its owner, opened at the location of the closed Dream Theater with plans to be operational in late December 1930. The Dream had been unoccupied for several years due in part to the opening of Centralia's Fox Theater. Remodeled and installed with film projectors and sound equipment to play talkies, the theater formally opened on January 3, 1931, and the first feature was the Amos 'n' Andy film, Check and Double Check. The movie house was outfitted with RCA sound equipment and the interior received new carpeting, lighting, and the walls and ceiling were redecorated. Initial admission charges were 10 cents for children, 25 cents for adults, and the venue offered matinee and evening showings. A ventilation system to provide more comfort during warmer weather was installed at the Peacock a few months later. In September 1931, the frying pan used to cook a record-setting omelet earlier that summer at the local Alexander Park was displayed at the Peacock and films that recorded the event were shown.

The Peacock closed briefly in 1933 for renovations of both the interior and exterior of the building. It reopened in November with a showing of the film State Fair and a policy was introduced to primarily showcase new movies and second screenings of popular films. Two months later in January 1934, the Peacock family sold the theater to the Twin City Theatre Company, moving to Ferndale, Washington to undertake another theater venture. The Peacock was renamed the Grand Theater, or more simply as "The Grand", by March.

The Grand hosted Bank Night during the Great Depression, a popular game of chance that was widely available in rural areas despite pressures to ban the gambling events. During the height of bank nights, the film venue, with an occupancy of 284, once reached an overflow capacity of 500 people. A ten-year lease was signed in 1938 to continue The Grand at the Hotel Washington, with plans for remodeling to make the venue a "first-class theater". However, the theater was closed before, or soon after, the Pix Theater opened. (Note: Reports on the closure of the Peacock/Grand Theater are vague, mentioning roughly 1938 or 1940. See sources listed.)

== Yard Birds Cinema (1982) ==
Yard Birds Cinema 3
- Interactive map of Yard Birds Cinema 3
- Former names: Chehalis Cinemas
- Address: 2100 N National Avenue
- Coordinates: 46°40′59.6316″N 122°57′40.2156″W
- Owner: Luxury Theatres, Act III, Regal Cinemas, Daryl Lund
- Screen: 3
- Production: Film

Construction
- Opened: 1982
- Renovated: 2003
- Closed: March 2009

The Yard Birds Mall, located at the very northern limits of the city of Chehalis, had several movie theater operations over the course of its existence. The first theater, referred to as Cinema 3, was built and opened in 1982. It held three screens and encompassed 7,500 square feet (700 m^{2}). Operators such as Luxury Theatres, Act III, and Regal Cinemas oversaw operations for stretches of time. The Act III ownership ended after the flood of 1996. Regal became the new operator but did not renew their lease in 2002, at which time the cinema went into private ownership.

The new owner, Daryl Lund, also owned the Chehalis Theater concurrently. There were plans in 2003 to expand the footprint to 8 screens, with a total occupancy of approximately 1,000 people. The $1.5 million project did not materialize but the theater did complete work on improvements for sound and layouts to the existing area. It was at this time that the owner and his partners began to refer to the Yard Birds location as the Chehalis Cinemas, a name Lund also gave to the Chehalis Theater. Similar to the Chehalis movie house, the Yard Birds Cinema 3 struggled in its competition with the larger Midway Cinema at the Lewis County Mall which was located directly north; Cinema 3 shut down in March 2009. A group focused on providing Spanish-subtitled films to the local populace opened the screens in May, providing a concessions stand geared more towards Latin foods, but the new venture failed to draw audiences, closing six months later in October 2009. No theater operated again in the mall and Yard Birds was permanently closed in 2022.

== Midway Cinemas (2008) ==
Midway Cinemas
- Interactive map of Midway Cinemas
- Address: 181 NE Hampe Way
- Coordinates: 46°41′59.6316″N 122°57′22.2984″W
- Owner: Coming Attractions Theaters
- Seating type: Stadium-style
- Capacity: approx. 160 per screen
- Screen: 10
- Production: Film
- Parking: Parking lot

Construction
- Opened: October 10, 2008

Website
- Midway Cinemas

The venture to build the Midway Cinema began in 2003 under management of Coming Attractions Theaters. The theater occupies the Rite Aid location at the Lewis County Mall that had been abandoned by the drug store company since 2004. It was originally planned to open in late 2007 and was to be a fully digital cinema of first-run films. The Midway was built without a projection booth, one of the first such multiplexes to have done so in the United States.

The Midway Cinemas opened on October 10, 2008. It is a 10-screen movie theater with stadium-style seating that encompasses 34,500 square feet (3,210 m^{2}) and has an average occupancy of approximately 160 people per screen, though upwards of up to 200 people in the larger theaters. The sale of 600 tickets was recorded on opening day and the first film featured was the 2008 horror movie, Quarantine. In November 2009, Midway projected the movie, The Twilight Saga: New Moon, on all screens during the film's opening weekend, breaking the theater company's overall records for attendance and sales. Similar to other movie houses in Washington state, Midway shut down for stretches of time during the COVID-19 pandemic, but moderately reopened in early 2021 with ticket prices listed at $7 for a first-run film. The cinema provided the only theater showing of the locally filmed independent movie, Maysville, in late 2021.
