= Lewis County Courthouse (Washington) =

NRHP-listed site in Chehalis, Washington

- U.S. National Register of Historic Places
- Washington State Heritage Register
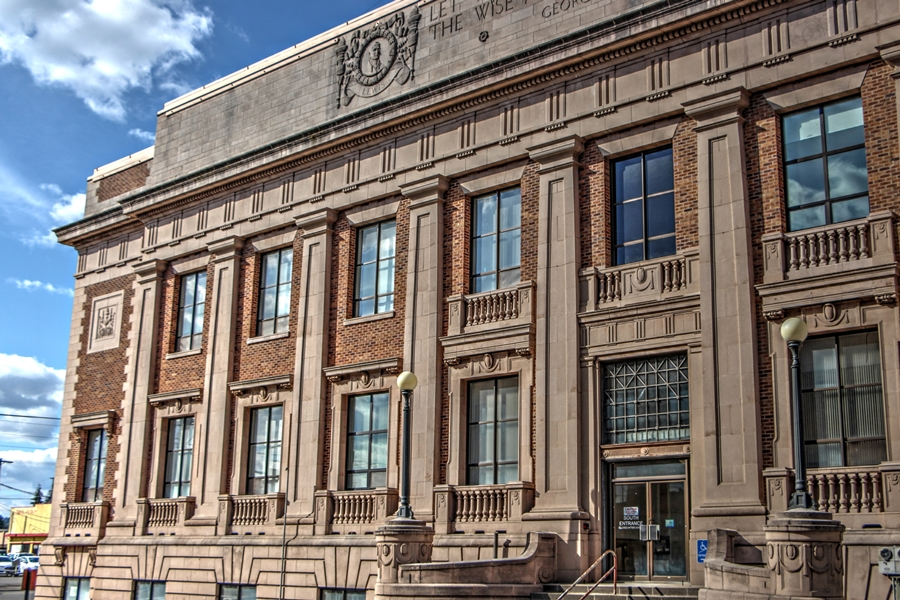
- Lewis County Courthouse, Chehalis, 2017

- Location within Washington (state)
- Location: 351 NW North Street, Chehalis, Washington
- Coordinates: 46°39′42″N 122°58′05″W
- Area: 0.05 acres (0.020 ha)
- Built: 1927
- Built by: S. Christian Erickson, Settergren Bros.
- Architect: Jack DeForest Griffin
- Architectural style: Beaux-Arts
- Restored: Multiple restorations
- Website: Lewis County website
- MPS: Chehalis MPS
- NRHP reference No.: 14000501

Significant dates
- Added to NRHP: August 18, 2014
- Designated WSHR: June 20, 2014

The Lewis County Courthouse is a neo-classical Beaux-Arts inspired courthouse located in Chehalis, Washington. The structure was listed on the National Register of Historic Places on August 18, 2014.

The Lewis County Courthouse is the last of possibly 7 or more courthouses that represented the county, including two prior judicial buildings in the city of Chehalis. The first official courthouse is debated between the home of Judge Sidney Ford in Ford's Prairie or the log cabin Jackson Courthouse under early pioneer John R. Jackson in present-day Mary's Corner. Judicial proceedings were known to have taken place on the homesteads of other prominent, early settlers in Lewis County. The first courthouse built on order of the county government was located in Claquato, temporarily becoming the county seat.

The county seat moved to Chehalis in 1874 and the first courthouse in the city was constructed that same year. The structure served as a centralized judicial building until possibly 1901, when the county purchased a mixed-use hotel, entertainment, and commercial building built by the matriarch of Chehalis, Elizabeth Barrett Saunders. Known as the Barret Block Courthouse, it was often in disrepair, considered unsanitary, and experienced several prison escapes. The site was criticized consistently in the local press for its lack of facility and the building's eyesore nature. Moderate attempts to keep the building in working order were undertaken and it lasted as use as a courthouse until the Lewis County Courthouse was completed in June 1927.

The Lewis County Courthouse held a dedication on June 17, 1927 after two years of construction. Attended by prominent government officials and a large crowd, the festivities included an evening ball. The courthouse was declared to last 100 years and, as the "people's courthouse", was always open to any and all Lewis County citizens.

The courthouse, designed by Jacque "Jack" DeForest Griffin, was erected at a cost of over $418,000 on a corner lot at Main Street and Chehalis Avenue on grounds that contained a church and other buildings. The four-story structure is built mostly of concrete, with Tenino sandstone, carved inscriptions, and various motifs on the exterior. Bronze doors dominate the main entrance on North Street. The interior is dominated by a central staircase and the building contains original woodwork. Painting restoration efforts in the early 2000s reflected the initial wall colors of the 1920s. It once contained a jail on the attic floor from which several escapes were attempted, some successful. The courthouse floors include a basement and mezzanine and numerous original details still remain within the corridors of the building.

The courthouse, despite being built with expansion in mind, began to suffer from overcrowding in the coming decades. The judicial building became a focal point of a larger government campus created to alleviate the crowding issue, beginning with the build of a 1950s annex known as the Lewis County Public Health Building. Continuing issues over a lack of functional space led to the construction of the Lewis County Law and Justice Center annex in the late 1970s, and the Lewis County Jail at the turn of the century. The Law and Justice Center once contained a skyway that connected to the courthouse, its purpose to ferry prisoners between the two buildings. The skywalk, the only such architectural feature in the county at the time, was removed for lack of use and deterioration in 2002.

The Lewis County Courthouse has experienced over its lifetime several fires, acts of prisoner violence, vandalism, and is often a site for local protests. The building has also undergone numerous remodels, renovations, and restorations as needs for the county government has changed. Despite the necessary alterations over the years, restorations have allowed the courthouse to remain true to its original state.

As of 2014, the courthouse's rebuild value was reported to be $140 million. The judicial building has been noted for its permanence of construction, historic character, ties to courthouse history in the county, and is considered to be an excellent example of pride within Lewis County and the city of Chehalis.

== History ==
=== Early county courthouse history ===
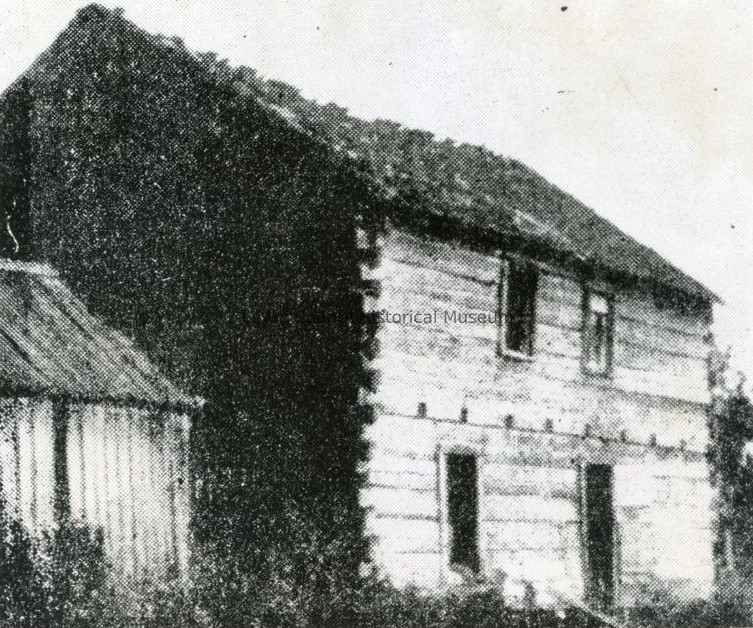
Sidney Ford home and courthouse, ca. 19th century

Lewis County had several county seats and courthouses before finally settling in Chehalis. The first recorded Lewis County proceeding was a commissioner's meeting at the Ford's Prairie home of Judge Sidney (Sydney) Smith Ford on October 4, 1847. The first judicial proceeding in the county, then part of the Washington Territory, was held in October 1850 at the log cabin Jackson family home on Jackson Prairie, eventually known as Mary's Corner. The court matter, a selection of jurors, was overseen by Federal Judge William R. Strong of Oregon. The record of which location was the first official courthouse in the county has remained up for debate.

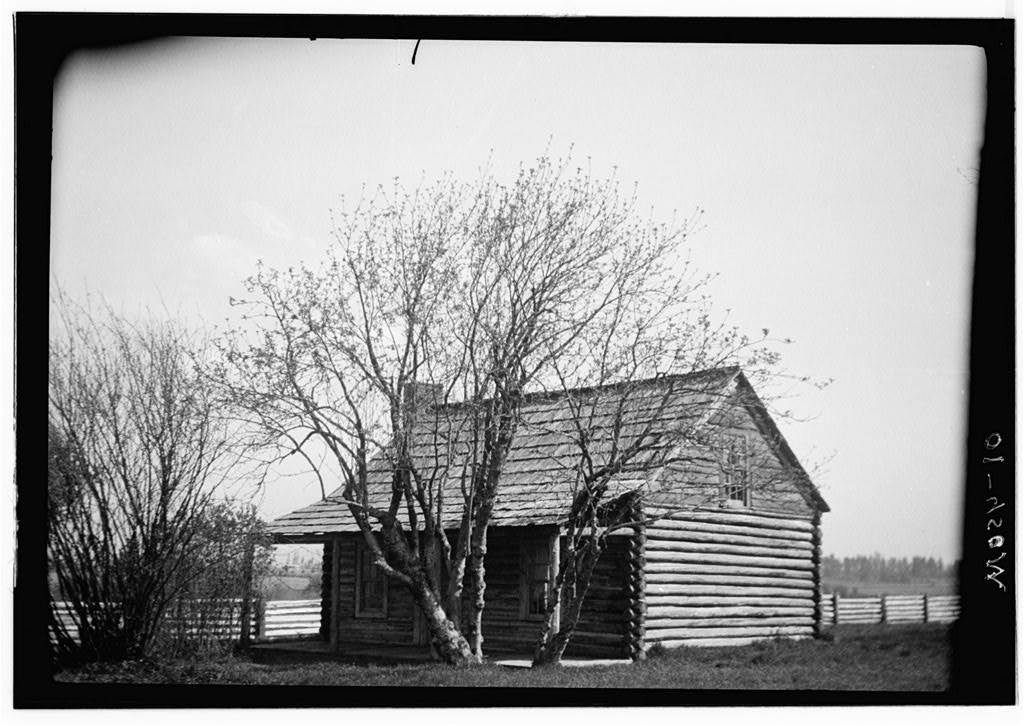
Jackson Courthouse, ca. 1930s

Proceedings alternated between the Ford and Jackson locations for a time, creating a rivalry, with Mr. Ford once refusing to attend a meeting at the Jackson location; he was fined $10. Commissioner meetings often described issues of travel as deplorable and time-consuming. The Ford site, now lost and its location not specifically known, (Note: By the 1927 dedication of the Lewis County Courthouse, foundation stones of the Ford home were reported as still visible.) was considered too remote and the Jackson courthouse difficult to reach for people traveling from the Puget Sound region. Hazards included traversing the Skookumchuck River and muddy lands of Saundersville, the early name of what became known as Chehalis. The creation of Thurston County in 1852 lessened the need to travel to Lewis County for court matters and the Jackson Courthouse became the central legal meeting house for the county.

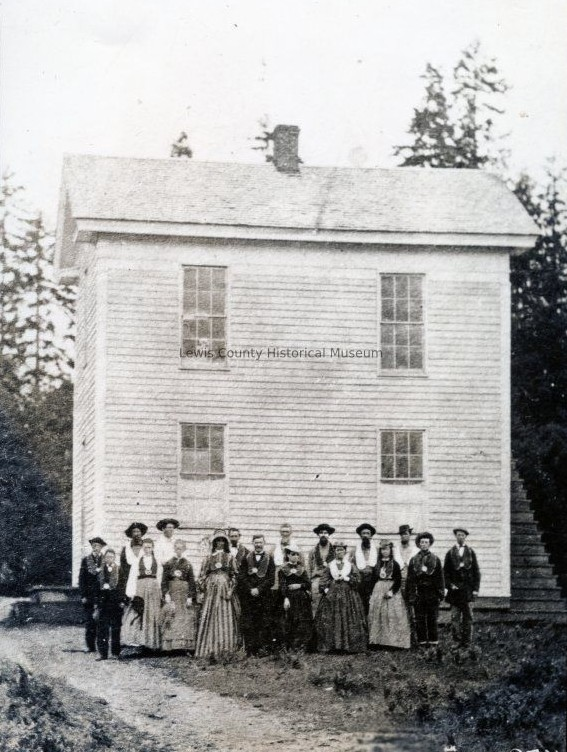
Claquato Courthouse, 1869

Court and county proceedings have been recorded or mentioned as being held during the 1850s in other locations possibly due to changes in county commissioners or a continuation of political rivalries. Courthouses included the cabin of Simon Plamondon at Cowlitz Landing and the home of John Moore on the Newaukum Prairie, with a documented meeting on December 1, 1858.

Exhaustion over the constant moving of courthouse locations necessitated a territorial legislative act in January 1862 that provided funding for the construction of a permanent courthouse in the county. The community of Claquato was chosen as the county seat after the founder of the town, Lewis H. Davis, agreed to terms to donate land for the courthouse. It was built on a 161 ft × 250 ft (49 m × 76 m) parcel at the southeast corner of the intersection of Boistfort and Chehalis roads, north of the Claquato Church, a National Register of Historic Places site. Constructed by John D. (J.D.) Clinger, the two-story courthouse contained lumber supplied by Davis' sawmill and the site included a 120 foot (37 metres) flag pole. At the dedication of the flag pole, J.T. Browning, lacking a cannon, struck his anvil as a salute. Up until the construction of the Claquato Courthouse, there are no known records of the county previously spending funds on a courthouse.

The Claquato Courthouse was completed in six months, and the first event held was a fundraiser for the Union during the Civil War. Thomas Pearson served as probate judge and J.D. Clinger as justice of the peace. Despite its designation as a courthouse, travel to Lewis County for court-related matters was still difficult and no official court proceedings were recorded as occurring during its time. However, the building was used to conduct county business. The county seat shifted to Chehalis in 1874 and the Claquato courthouse was used for several community functions such as a schoolhouse, Grange hall, and as a cheese factory. It was ultimately demolished in 1888, the lumber used to build a home for a Claquato family.

=== First courthouse in Chehalis ===
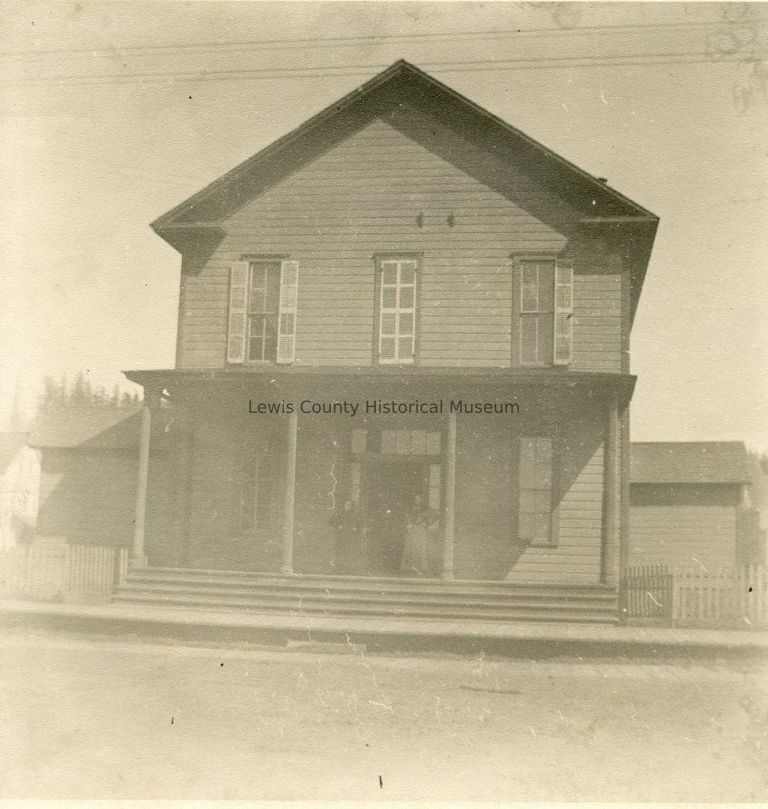
First Lewis County Courthouse building in Chehalis, ca.1890

The first official courthouse in Chehalis was begun in the spring of 1874 and completed a few months later in June. Built on a cleared acre of land at the corner of North Street and State Avenue, construction on the two-story wood-framed courthouse was overseen by an Olympia-based contractor, W.H. Taylor & Sons. The footprint was listed as 30 ft × 46 ft (9.1 m × 14.0 m); the first floor contained offices for public services and the top floor reserved for courtrooms.

As part of the move of the county seat, the county only agreed to earmark $1,000 for the building's construction, necessitating a bond to cover additional costs signed by several prominent citizens, including John Dobson and William West. The total cost of the build reached $3,000. The courthouse was formally dedicated on July 4, 1874. A day-long celebration was followed by a ball inside the courthouse; tickets to attend cost $2.50 per couple.

Public documents from around the county were transferred to the site in August and a small judicial campus was built on the block, including a building for office space and a county jail. Eventually as the county and city grew, the structure was considered too small for use. The courthouse was also considered too old and in disrepair, referred to by the county commissioners as a "rotten fire trap". Official discussions to find a new courthouse began in 1898, with a bid on another site, known as the Barret brick building, authorized by September 1899. The first official county courthouse's purpose ceased in either 1889, 1897, or 1901. (Note: The final year discrepancies of the first courthouse in Chehalis is noted between local reporting and the NRHP form. See sources available throughout the section.)

The structure was sold and moved to the corner of Market and West streets where it became known as the Spalding Hotel. The Spalding was destroyed by fire of unknown origin on the evening of November 14, 1911. (Note: Early suspicions on the Spalding Hotel fire suggested the cause was an overheated stove based on where the blaze seemed to begin.)

=== Barrett Block Courthouse ===
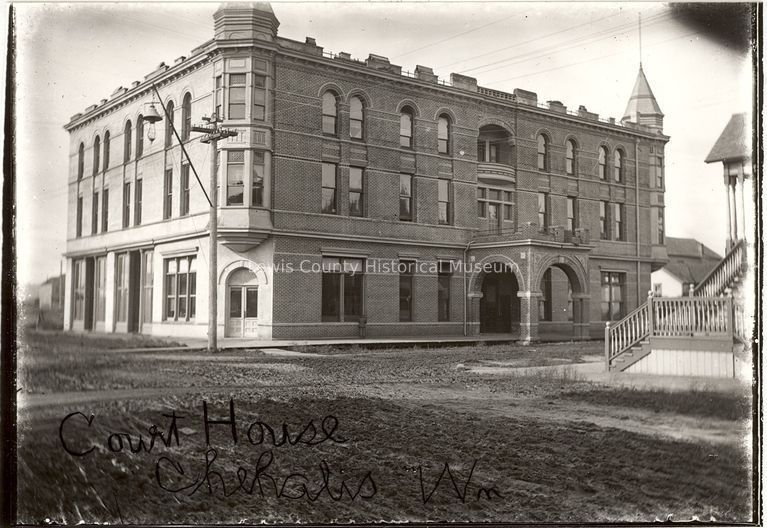
Barrett Block Courthouse, ca. 1900

The Barrett Block Courthouse, located in the original downtown district of Chehalis, was a block east of the first courthouse. The building was originally a mixed-used building featuring the city's Grand Central Hotel, a bank, saloon, and a variety of stores. The building was erected in 1891 by Elizabeth Barrett Saunders, also known as the "Mother of Chehalis". (Note: Other records erroneously report the Barrett building may have been purchased, with subsequent construction to convert the structure as a courthouse, in 1889, with the courthouse not ready for use until 1891.) After the shift of the downtown core to Market Street, the Barrett building was mostly vacant and compiling numerous back taxes. After Barret died, the structure was planned to be sold by one of her son's to pay off the tax debt.

Instead, the Barret brick building was ordered into sale by the county's Superior court with the express understanding that the county would purchase the site for no more than $8,000. The city completed the sale of the three-story hotel structure for $6,500, spending an additional $3,000 for repairs and upgrades. (Note: The Barrett Hotel originally cost $40,000 to construct.) Major renovations were undertaken in late 1899 which included an overhaul of the layouts of each floor.

Since its beginnings, the Barrett courthouse was often chided in the local press due to its location and lack of facility. The courthouse jail was overcrowded and convict escapes were common. New jail cells were added in February 1908 and later again in July.

The county board of commissioners began looking to replace the Barrett courthouse by as early as 1909 as the facility was already in need of repairs and rooms were considered "not as handy as they should be". A report by a county grand jury, condemning parts of the building in 1917, suggested that the Barret Courthouse be remodeled. The county commissioner board decided to provide only limited funding to keep the structure operational, opting instead for a new courthouse building to be constructed at a later date. Some minor repairs were undertaken in 1918 to the roof, repainting of exposed tin and a jury room was wallpapered.

The day after the events of the November 11, 1919 Centralia Tragedy, the International Workers of the World (IWW) prisoners were transported to the courthouse for safety. At a trial held in the Superior courtroom in June 1920, four members of the IWW were found guilty of "criminal syndicalism" tied to the events.

By the 1920s, the building was falling into disrepair and considered an "eyesore" that shamed the community and its pride. Major concerns included the structure's safety and cleanliness. In January 1926, an inspection by the local fire department chief, whose description of the site's condition was "reported in a bad way", led the Barret Block Courthouse to be declared as condemned. Immediate requests from city government officials to tear down the old courthouse did not materialize, and several attempts were made to sell the abandoned structure to no avail. Wrecking operations, specifically hiring unemployed men, did not officially began until January 1932, where attempts to save brick and "other useful material" were implemented. During the tear-down, workers were invigorated during a search to find $50 in gold that was supposedly hidden by a prisoner in the jail cell area; an old bottle of liquor was found instead.

==== Jail breaks ====
Jail breaks were common at the Barrett Block Courthouse beginning in the 1900s until its closure. In May 1907, "another escape" was led by burglar Harry Crowley who created a makeshift key to open the iron door of the jail cell area. Only two other inmates left, found later walking around Chehalis's downtown. Crowley was captured later in Newaukum after a chase and a few gun shots. A six-man escape occurred in March 1908. The prisoners sawed through a ceiling after a carpentry crew left a handsaw behind.

A robber, who planned to kill a child and use the body to transport stolen jewelry, escaped in 1908 but was recaptured in West Virginia. A demonstration on jail breaking was held in February 1910. Edward Marshall, the "World’s Jailbreaker and Handcuff King", escaped from a jail cell despite being strip searched, handcuffed, and the cell padlocked. Marshall strolled out to the gathered crowd a short time later, free of any constraints.

An escape of six men occurred in April 1911 after one prisoner, Frank Parmenter, broke from his cell and released other men who were under indictments for such crimes as assault, burglary and forgery. Several installation failures, such as a single-system lock mechanism and availability of removable metal parts, allowed the prisoners to create makeshift tools to saw through floor boards and carve out space in the brickwork over the course of one or two days. The men absconded from the second floor jail area via the manmade hole, lowering themselves down to street level with intertwined blankets. Only Parmenter had been captured within a week after the escape. In July, notorious criminal and jailbreaker, John Bogden, fled the courthouse jail.

In 1920, Alfred Hall, a juvenile or adult depending on the account of witnesses, sawed through the floor of the Barrett's juvenile jail cell and escaped. Held on charges of multiple robberies, he continued his spree north into Seattle, was recaptured, and when transported back to Chehalis, jumped off the train and escaped again.

== Lewis County Courthouse ==
=== Beginnings ===
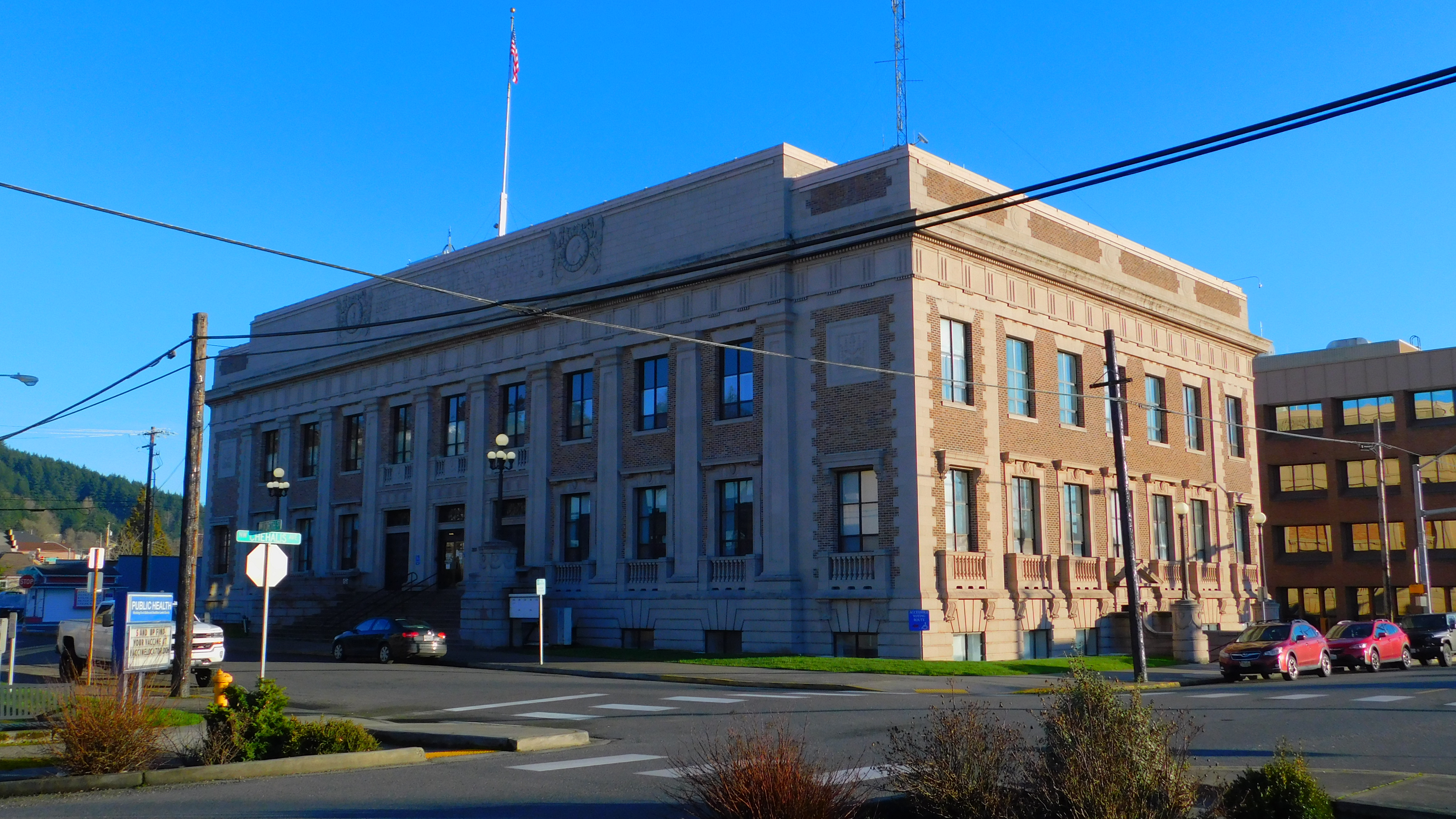
Northwest view, 2022

The beginnings of the Lewis County Courthouse, motivated by excess funds from the 1923 county budget, began with the purchase of a parcel of land located directly across from the Barret Courthouse at the northeast intersection of Main Street and Chehalis Avenue. The sale was completed on May 28, 1923 for $16,700, though the county commissioner board had not yet approved the build of a new judicial facility. With affordable, available, and desirable plots in the city harder to find, the board determined that the time for the purchase was "propitious" and the lot considered conducive to a more financially feasible construction.

The parcel, sold by the A.E. Judd Company, contained a Methodist church, a blacksmith shop, and a wood structure that was part of an apartment house; the existing buildings were put up for sale in July 1923.

=== Construction ===
In January 1925, the Lewis County commissioner's board announced the approval for the construction of the Lewis County Courthouse. Work began immediately and the building was designed in the Beaux-Arts-style, a popular architectural trend for the time, by architect Jacque "Jack" DeForest Griffin, an influential designer in 1920s Chehalis, specifically in the Chehalis Downtown Historic District. Construction costs were first estimated to be $250,000 but advanced as high as $425,000. (Note: Until a public release of the final construction costs, reports on the official expenditures varied. At the formal acceptance of the new courthouse in early June 1927, the total price tag was mentioned as $350,000.) The project was funded by a two-year period of several levies and was not paid for by bond, public debt, or a tax increase. The funding was suspected to be the first such non-debt financing of a new courthouse construction in the state. The cash-only project, however, led the county to take on debt into 1927 to fund other areas, such as education and operational needs, the first time Lewis County had a need to do so in several years.

The courthouse was built in two phases. The first stage was overseen by a former Chehalis resident and Tacoma builder, S. Christian Erickson, who was in charge of pouring and casting the foundation, basement, and concrete shell and structural support. Started in July 1925, approximately 2,600 cubic yards (2,000 m^{3}) of concrete was poured, utilizing aggregate and sand from Centralia. The first phase was considered mostly finished by December 1925, with the jail floor and roof being completed at year's end. The courthouse project proceeded to completion under a second unit by the Settergren Brothers of Portland, Oregon under a $198,500 city permit. The permit was considered the largest ever issued by Chehalis at the time. The overall project was under management of A.J. Rousch (Roush) of Seattle.

A beacon light was installed on the roof in August 1926. As part of an installation of aviation lights in the corridor between Portland, Oregon and Seattle, the beacon could be seen from over 150 miles (240 km) away. Furnishings for the building were ordered by the commissioners in February 1927, budgeted under a $65,000 emergency warrant. The sum, reported as an excess over previous estimates, was of such concern that a public hearing was held but no objections were noted. Weeks before the dedication, one of the final construction efforts, that of new sidewalks on the facility grounds, was completed in May for just under $1,000.

The consideration of future needs and expansion was a crucial process on the planning, layout, and construction of the judicial building. The massive, new courthouse was declared as "permanent" and built in such a manner for "ample room for future growth".

=== Dedication ===
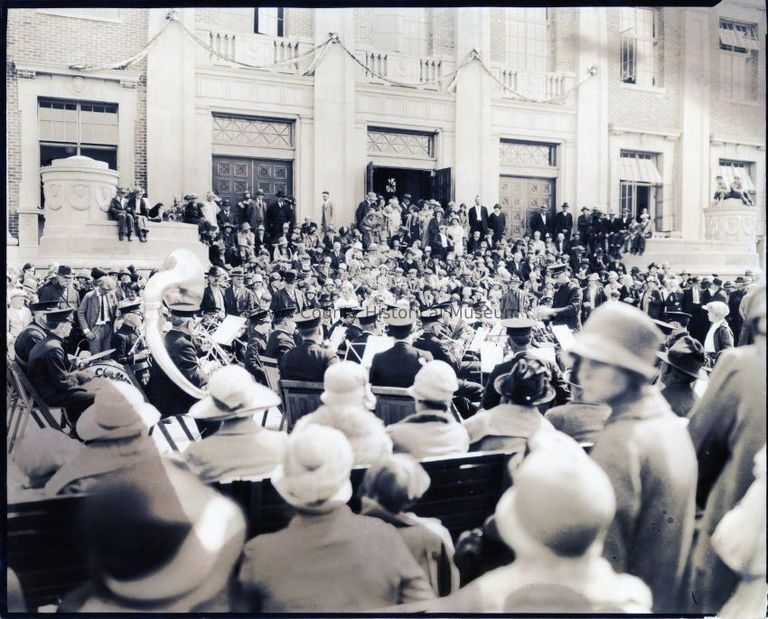
Crowd at the dedication ceremony, June 17, 1927

The new courthouse was formally accepted by Lewis County on June 1, 1927 and a final inspection a few days later noted that, outside of a few minor fixes, the building was "finished practically as desired".

The formal dedication was held on June 17, 1927 and was overseen and planned by the Chehalis Citizens Club. A half-holiday for the city was planned and several events took place during the open house ceremonies, including a baseball game and an evening dance at the city's auditorium. The courthouse was announced to be of use for "at least the next 100 years".

Guests included representatives of several farming and business organizations and mayors from cities in the surrounding region. The public was able to tour the building and meet with government representatives and staff. All three county commissioners spoke, thanking the crowd, remarking on the history of the county and Chehalis as well as the previous courthouses. County commissioner B.H. Stacy remarked to the crowd that the courthouse was the "people's building", and that they were "welcome to use it at all times." Architect Jack Griffin spoke, as well as several prominent citizens of the county and the city, including N.B. Coffman, retired Superior Court Judge W.W. Langhorne, Albert Tozier, and Chehalis mayor, John West. A historian from the Washington State Historical Society, the mayors from Centralia and Morton, and other dignitaries made brief remarks on local history, personal recollections, and glowing accolades of the new courthouse. Music was provided by a band from the Pomona Grange and hundreds attended the evening ball at the city's civic auditorium.

The official cost for the complete construction and furnishings of the Lewis County Courthouse was listed at $418,931.17, provided via a public, itemized report.

=== Overcrowding and first annex ===
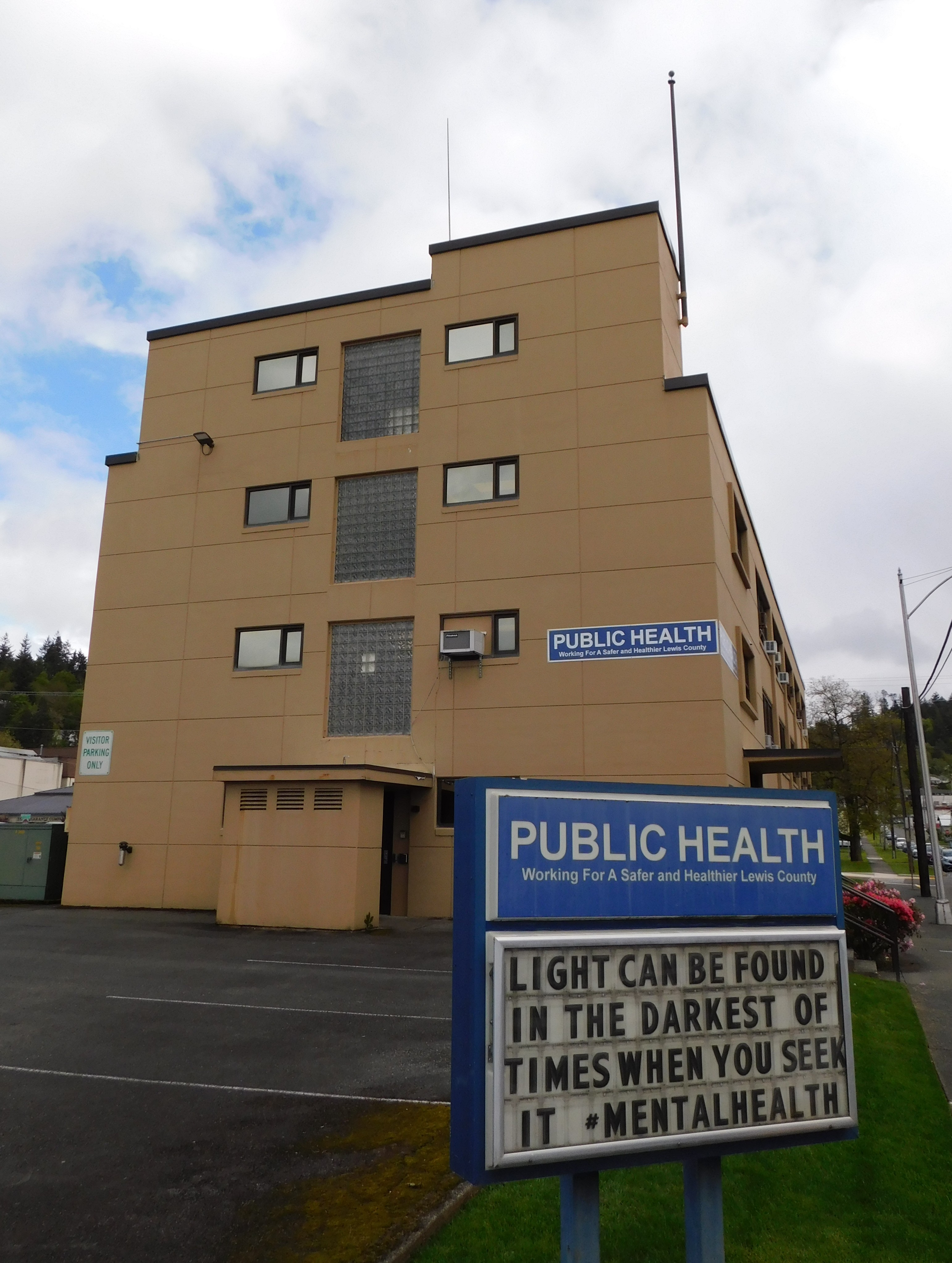
Lewis County Public Health Building, 2024

Due to overcrowded conditions at the courthouse, an annex was built on a parking lot immediately to the north. The project, with early proposals beginning in 1951 at a cost of up to $180,000, was initially begun in early 1952. The annex was designed by Olympia architect, Joseph H. Wohleb. By July 1953, funding for the courthouse annex reached $300,000 and the foundation was poured. The build of the exterior shell began in October. The building, officially known as the Lewis County Courthouse Annex, was completed at a cost of $270,000 and opened in September 1954.

For a time, the annex's roof was used as a helipad for the county sheriff's department. A preexisting garage for the county's car pool, built in 1927 with a lean-to addition from 1889, was replaced beginning in 1956. Located immediately across the courthouse on Chehalis Avenue, the structures were substituted with a $66,000 concrete garage able to store more vehicles and provide an office for staff, as well as a car washing station.

The first annex was renamed in 1977 to the Lewis County Health Services Building during the build of a newer annex, eventually known as the Lewis County Law and Justice Center.

=== Continued congestion and second annex ===
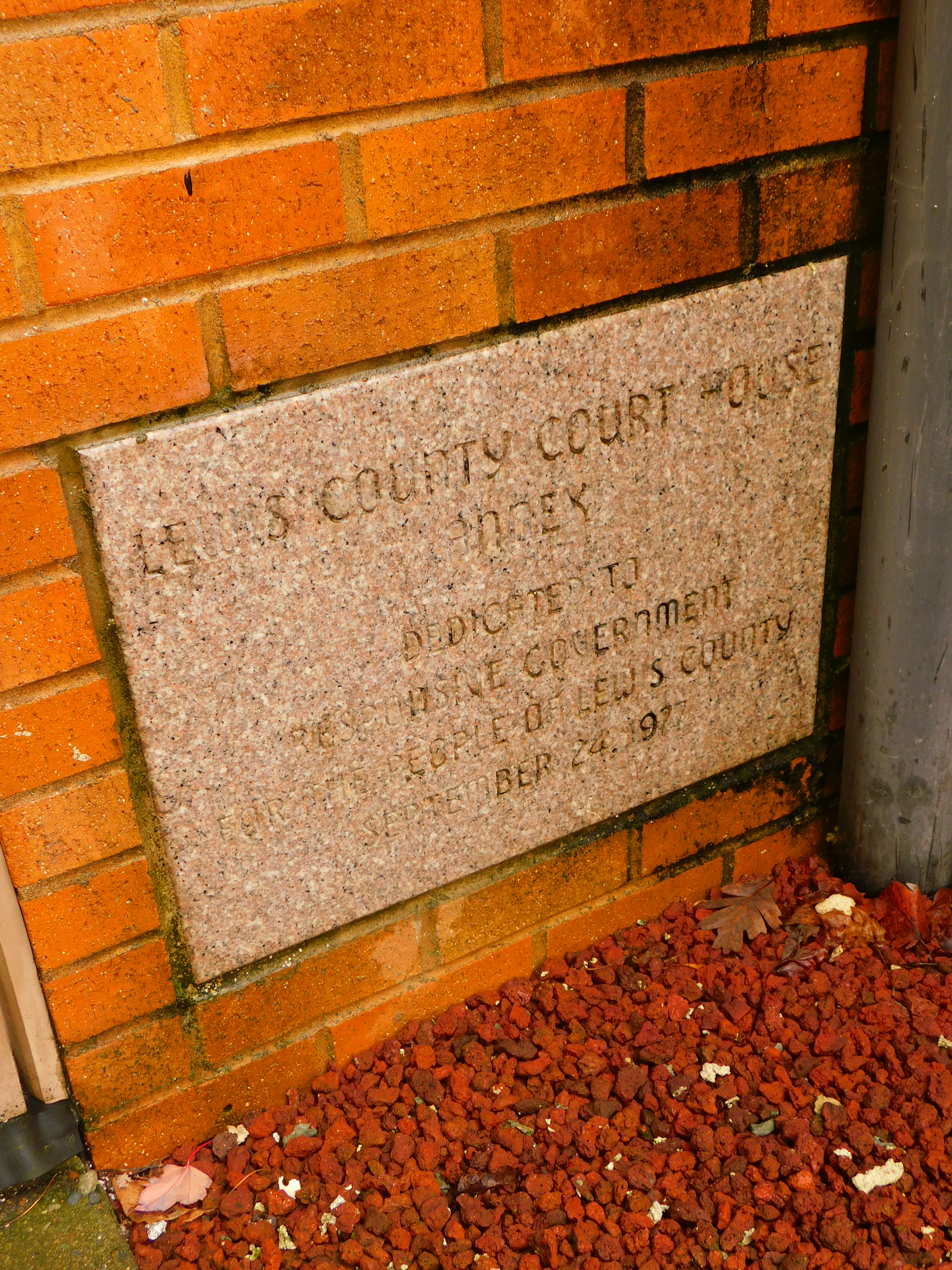
Cornerstone, 1977 annex

As the state legislature only required a county with a population above 60,000 to have a separate juvenile lockup, Lewis County was not legally required to do so. However, a new detention center for juveniles was proposed in November 1961, citing a need to keep teenagers and younger children separated from adult offenders due to overcrowding issues at the courthouse's jail area.

In 1964, due to automobile congestion, parking areas around the courthouse were changed. A section of angled parking was shifted to parallel and a new loading zone was created. Although the number of parking spaces were actually reduced, a one-hour limit was concurrently introduced that allowed for faster turnover of available spaces.

Early ideas for a campus expansion began in 1972, with special attention to jail overcrowding and a potential consolidation of jails in the Twin Cities (Note: Centralia and Chehalis are commonly referred to as the Twin Cities due to their immediate location to one another. See city articles for further information.) and county prison facilities. One plan was to build a fourth-story on the courthouse to house an expanded jail cell area, but it was found "unfeasible" from an engineering perspective. Expansion of the current jail on the third floor, as well as a jail area in the basement for juveniles and women, were considered as an alternative. A $3 million project was proposed in late-1973 to construct a five-story building as an addition to the courthouse and was to be located on North Street near the annex. With a need for more space due to increased workload, and a centralized, efficient county government at the courthouse, the addition was to add 55,000 square feet (5,100 m^{2}) to the annex structure and would have been connected to both existing buildings by means of enclosed walkways. The proposal also included a remodel of the annex's roof, converting it into an exercise yard for inmates. The project was not well received at first, despite reports that detailed the overcrowded conditions of the facility. The report mentioned that the courthouse was upwards of 50% too small and staff were "working on top of each other".

Expansion talks spanned into 1974, with a citizens advisory committee formed on January 11 to recommend a campus expansion study. An agreement was reached in March to authorize an $18,200 study and master plan. A draft of the study was released in July, but the plan lacked space for the county coroner's office.

Reactions to the expansion remained mixed and several proposals beyond another annex, such as the removal of non-county offices, were suggested. Opposition, as well as confusion, continued into 1976 and a revised study was submitted in February, with plans for the new four-story annex to be located across the courthouse on Main Street. The annex was to contains two district courtrooms, floors specifically for public works and other government agencies, and a skyway connecting the two facilities. The proposal was to officially rename the 1950s annex as the Health Services Building. Additional parking with a 5,400-square-foot (500 m^{2}) storage building, along with renovations to the courthouse that included a new elevator and ramps for disabled access for the courthouse, were included in the study.

The building permit for the parking garage was temporarily denied in March due to confusion over the number of allowed parking spaces and zoning regulations in Chehalis. The denial was also based on the courthouse's superseding grandfather rights which may not have needed to meet a permit requirement. A permit was issued a few days later after a hearing. In April, in preparation of the renovations and annex build, the district court moved to the Health Services annex.

Final authorization by August 1976 estimated the construction costs of the annex at approximately $1.75 million, paid out of an existing fund, requiring no bonds or additional taxes. The final plans, designed by Chehalis architect James Hubenthal, listed four floors at 9,000 square feet (840 m^{2}) each and the official inclusion of a skybridge. The building was to be faced in brick with a stone cap on the roof and have numerous, but unopenable windows. The main entrance was located on Main Street and the building using a combination of a heat pump system and electrical backup for heating and cooling. Government agencies and law and justice departments were officially assigned spaces throughout the courthouse and annex complex.

In February 1977, the annex construction was awarded to Leo Gilnett Construction Company from Longview, Washington and ground was officially broken on March 27, 1977, south of the courthouse across Main Street. Costs were revised, with an estimation of $2.2 million. The skybridge, meant to transfer prisoners between the buildings, was located on the second story and the framework was put into place on December 29, 1977.

=== Late 20th century ===
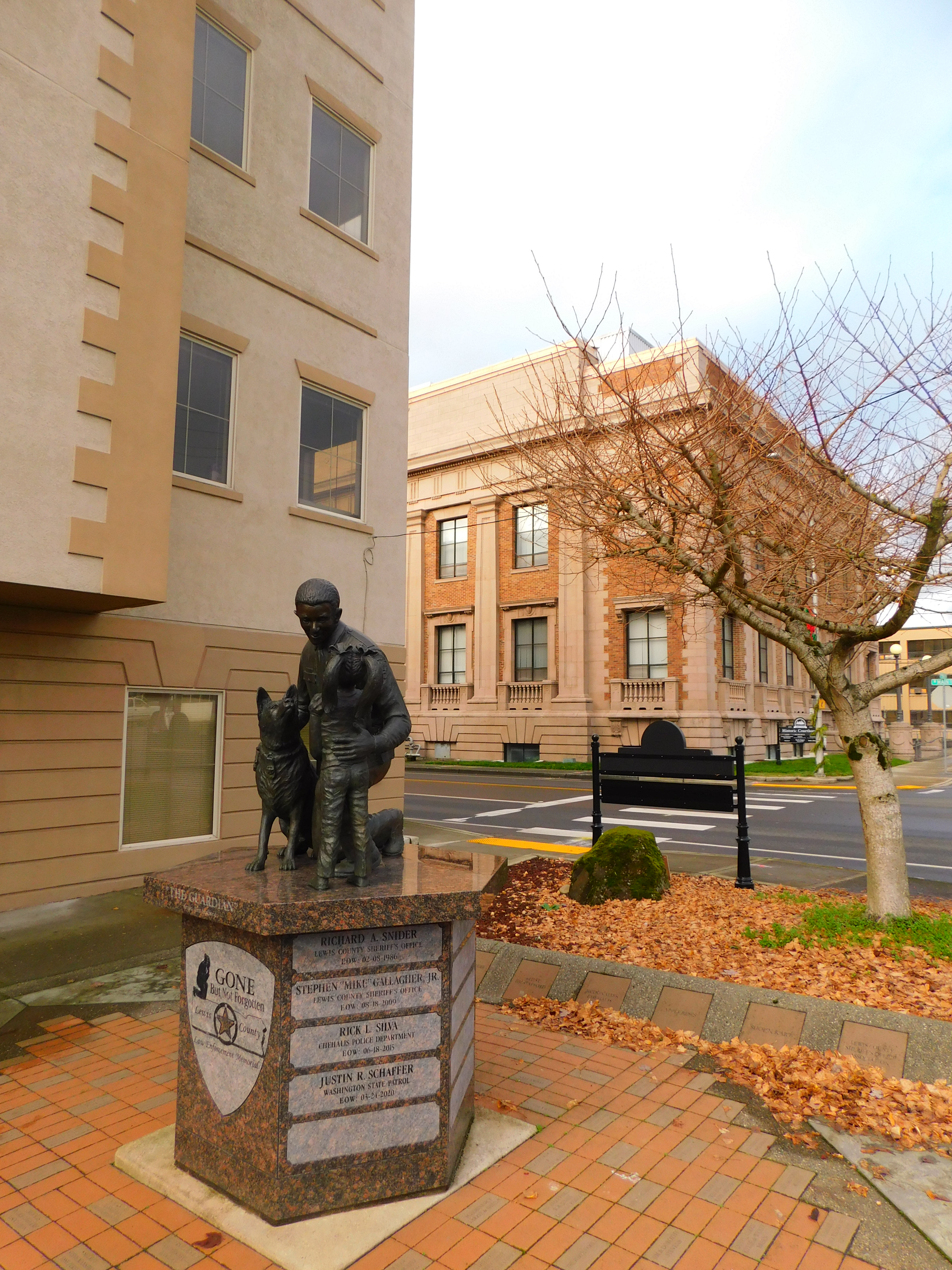
Center, courthouse, and Lewis County Law Enforcement Memorial, 2025

The courthouse jail, often overcrowded, was condemned in 1985. Prisoners were moved to the new annex where the issue of full inmate capacity remained.

Security was bolstered in 1995 after a continuing rise of verbal outbursts and violent instances in the building and in the aftermath of a mass shooting at the King County Courthouse.

Despite the construction of the two annexes, crowding at the courthouse, as well as within the expanded campus, was a continual concern. The county approved in September 1999 a $36.7 million plan to renovate the courthouse and provide expanded facilities. The project included the tear down of the existing Public Health Building with a rebuild of a new 4-story facility and the construction of a 4-story jail. The plan was to be financially supported by various bonds, sale of existing county buildings and property, and revenues generated by the county. Only the jail was built.

=== 21st century ===
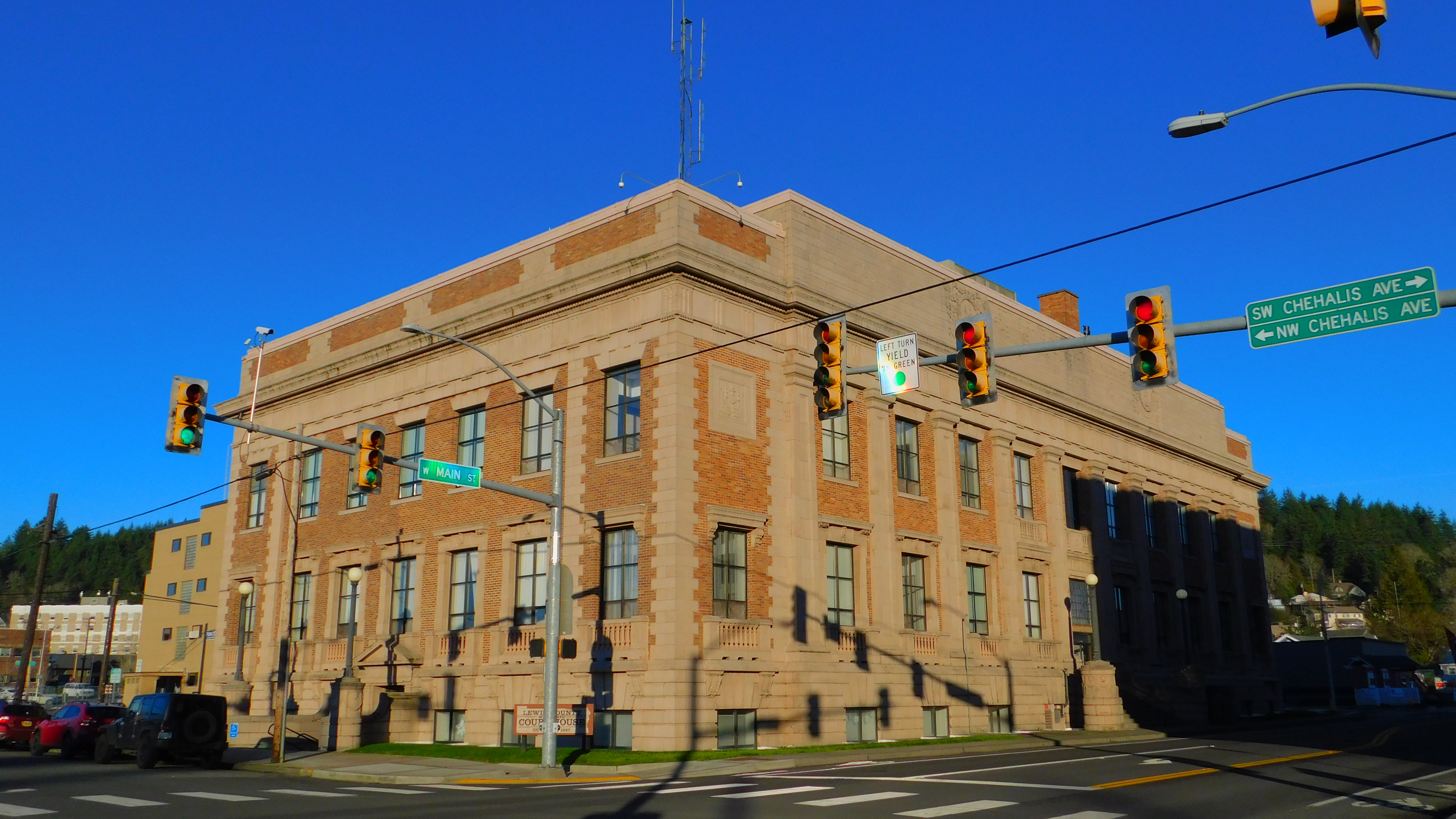
Southwest view, 2022

The skybridge, the only such architectural feature in the county at the time, was removed beginning in early 2002. No longer required to transport prisoners, the walkway had begun to deteriorate and repairs were not considered to be cost effective.

The courthouse was temporarily closed to the public beginning in March 2020 as a protective measure during the COVID-19 pandemic. The county's Department of Internal Services led a project to create social distancing measures allowing the courthouse to reopen in June 2020.

=== Jail breaks ===
In the early 1930s, Verell Reap escaped from the Lewis County Courthouse, serving a sentence for robbery of the Lebam post office. After he was recaptured and sent to Alcatraz Prison, he was returned to the county to face charges on jailbreaking. An escape occurred in May 1938, when a prisoner, Robert Lee Gavin, absconded from the building. He was found in October in The Dalles, Oregon, temporarily escaping from custody there before being sent back to Lewis County.

Three teenagers, who had previously escaped captivity in Colorado after being held for AWOL charges from their Air Force station post, attempted to flee the courthouse jail in July 1957. The trio were under additional charges of theft and burglary in Lewis County during their fugitive travel. The long-time jailer, ultimately held responsible for the escape attempt due to failures to properly follow procedure, was struck with a broom, suffering cuts to his head as well as burns after the trio threw hot coffee at him. The escapees were cordoned off and they attempted to access a plumbing recess, were they were trapped and apprehended. A rope to descend from the roof was found showing that the attempt was premeditated.

An attempted escape in February 1968 was thwarted when jailers heard the sound of a hacksaw grinding through metal. Three men at first attempted to cut through the bars of the cell, turning their attention to an overhead light fixture that led to the roof of the courthouse. Afterwards, an investigation found three hacksaw blades; it was not known how the prisoners came about procuring the tools.

Two convicts, serial killer William Perry Jackson and bank robber Gus Turner, cut into a wall and climbed up an open space to a skylight on the roof of the courthouse on the early morning of August 5, 1982. The pair used an amalgamation of blankets as a rope to escape off the side of the building. Jackson was apprehended without incident hours later, unarmed and out of his prison attire, in Portland, Oregon. Turner was eventually caught, and in 1984, broke out of Larch Corrections Center located in Yacolt, Washington.

=== Notable events and incidents ===
==== 20th century ====
A fire in a first floor storage room used for waste paper began on the evening of September 25, 1931. Considered to be caused by a discarded cigarette or spontaneous combustion, no damage was reported and inmates in the jail cells were not harmed; the courthouse was ventilated by the city's fire department due to the excessive smoke. In July 1934 during a mortgage foreclosure auction, a common event held at the courthouse during the Great Depression, a crowd gathered to protest the sale of a farm and the eviction of its owners. The assembly grew vocal and threatening enough that several law officers and the purchaser of the deed were hastily removed for their safety. Despite the growing crowd, no riot occurred. Three members of the crowd were charged with inciting a riot and the case was heard at the courthouse at the end of the year.

The Washington State Patrol office in the courthouse received minor damage from a panicked deer in September 1941. The animal, which was possibly injured after being struck by an automobile, was brought to the office by a concerned watchman. The deer was later released into some woodlands.

The county's first female deputy sheriff, Vera Roberts, was hired in 1953. Working in the sheriff's courthouse office, she was reported by the Centralia Daily Chronicle as bringing a "feminine touch" to the department, providing work in communications and paperwork filing that had "previously been done by a man".

The courthouse was used as the state's capitol building for one afternoon on October 26, 1961 during an exercise of the Thurston County Civil Defense. The governor, Albert Rosellini, as well as several department heads, transferred to the Lewis County courthouse during the training event. The governor's office was temporarily located in a vault in the courthouse basement.

The courthouse doors were vandalized on April 1, 1962. Thought to be an April Fool's prank, four, pink swastikas were painted on various entrances; the symbols were promptly removed by custodial staff. A fire started in the middle of a courthouse office in the late evening on October 19, 1967 destroying numerous court documents, as well as causing damage to the room and office furniture. During the investigation of the fire, approximately $7,000 was found to have been stolen from the office as well. This led to voluntary polygraph tests of 34 court employees; all workers were found innocent of both the fire and theft during the test. Investigators found that perhaps as many as 200 master keys had been handed out over the years for bathroom access, allowing an unknown number of people to access the office. The cause of the fire, as well as who stole the money, remains a mystery.

The courthouse was broken into and several fires were started inside the building on September 29, 1973. The county's Superior courtroom was almost completely destroyed, and severe damages were noted in the attached chambers, along with a court reporter's office; damages were estimated at $100,000. Other physical harms to the courthouse included damages caused by forced entry. The suspect, Joseph Moore, was found guilty on charges of arson and burglary in December of that year. Remodeling work was completed by February 1974 and a crowd of people attended an open house to view the efforts, which included a new judge's bench, light fixtures, and seating. Additions for better acoustics and a public speaker system were also installed. The project ended up costing $30,000 less than originally estimated.

In 1985, Lewis County Superior Court Judge Dale Nordquist sued the county commissioner board for the installation of windows in the courtroom he presided over. In possibly the first such instance of a Superior Court judge taking a county commission to court in Washington, Nordquist complained over a lack of modern windows and fresh air. Previously, windows existed in the courtroom but had been bricked over in 1967 to alleviate noise pollution. Nordquist found the stance of the county board to be "puzzling" after an 8-year effort to have the casements opened up. The county commissioners were concerned over unjustifiable costs and a reintroduction of noise to the building.

==== 21st century ====
A small protest against the county's decision to cancel funding for youth recreation and sports programs was held outside the courthouse on September 25, 2000. A former county commissioner and prior head of the recreation department joined the crowd of approximately 30 people which included children. Interrupted by passing motorists who honked car horns in support, the protest was peaceful; county commissioners, normally crossing the street to attend meetings between the courthouse and annex, opted to use the deteriorating skywalk instead.

A protest, stemming from a national grassroots effort and a locally organized tax relief party, was held outside the courthouse in April 2009. The crowd of approximately 150 people voiced their concerns over rising taxes and increased government spending. The hour-long protest was mostly calm, deviating from its non-aggressive approach to a few verbal disagreements only at the end when a speaker began speaking in negative tones.

The city held an open house in September 2014 to celebrate the courthouse's inclusion to both the National Register of Historic Places (NRHP) and Washington State Heritage Register. The celebrations honored past county commissioners and public servants. Gerry L. Alexander, a retired Chief Justice of the Washington Supreme Court, was a speaker. Several attendees to the event wore fashion from the 1920s and a photo was taken on the front steps that mirrored a picture taken during the 1927 dedication ceremonies. Visitors toured the jail which included an account of "Henry", a ghost who is perceived to haunt the inmate area. (Note: Employees at the courthouse speak of another, or potentially the same ghost who roams the old jail area and 911 dispatch center. Named, "Ernie", the unseen specter is purported to turn off lights during the late midnight hours.)

In October 2018, District Court judge R. W. Buzzard chased after two prisoners who attempted to escape from court proceedings. Both inmates were handcuffed and Buzzard, who threw off his judicial robes and leapt over his desk, was able to grab one of the escapees before they reached the courthouse doors. The second prisoner was apprehended nearby. Buzzard previously intervened in a fight in April that erupted in his courtroom after a civil defendant punched an attorney, leaving the bench and physically restraining the man.

Two protests were held in June and July 2020 at the courthouse. The first event was a demonstration in favor of the Black Lives Matter movement. The second gathering, containing 300 people, voiced their objection to the murder of George Floyd and the crowd knelt for 8 minutes 46 seconds in protest against police brutality. Notwithstanding a brief interruption, the assembly remained peaceful.

== Geography ==
The courthouse stands on a 100 ft × 200 ft (30 m × 61 m) parcel in what was the prior downtown area before the city relocated its main business core to the Chehalis Downtown Historic District on Market Street. Situated on a corner bordered by Chehalis Avenue and Main, North, and Pacific streets, the structure is the focal point of a county government campus in the city. The courthouse is surrounded by other government buildings, such as the Lewis County Law and Justice Center immediately across Main Street to the south, and the county's public health building to the north.

At the beginning of the courthouse's construction, the main entrance was considered to be located on North Street whereas the Main Street entrance was reported as secondary and the "less pretentious" point of access to the courthouse.

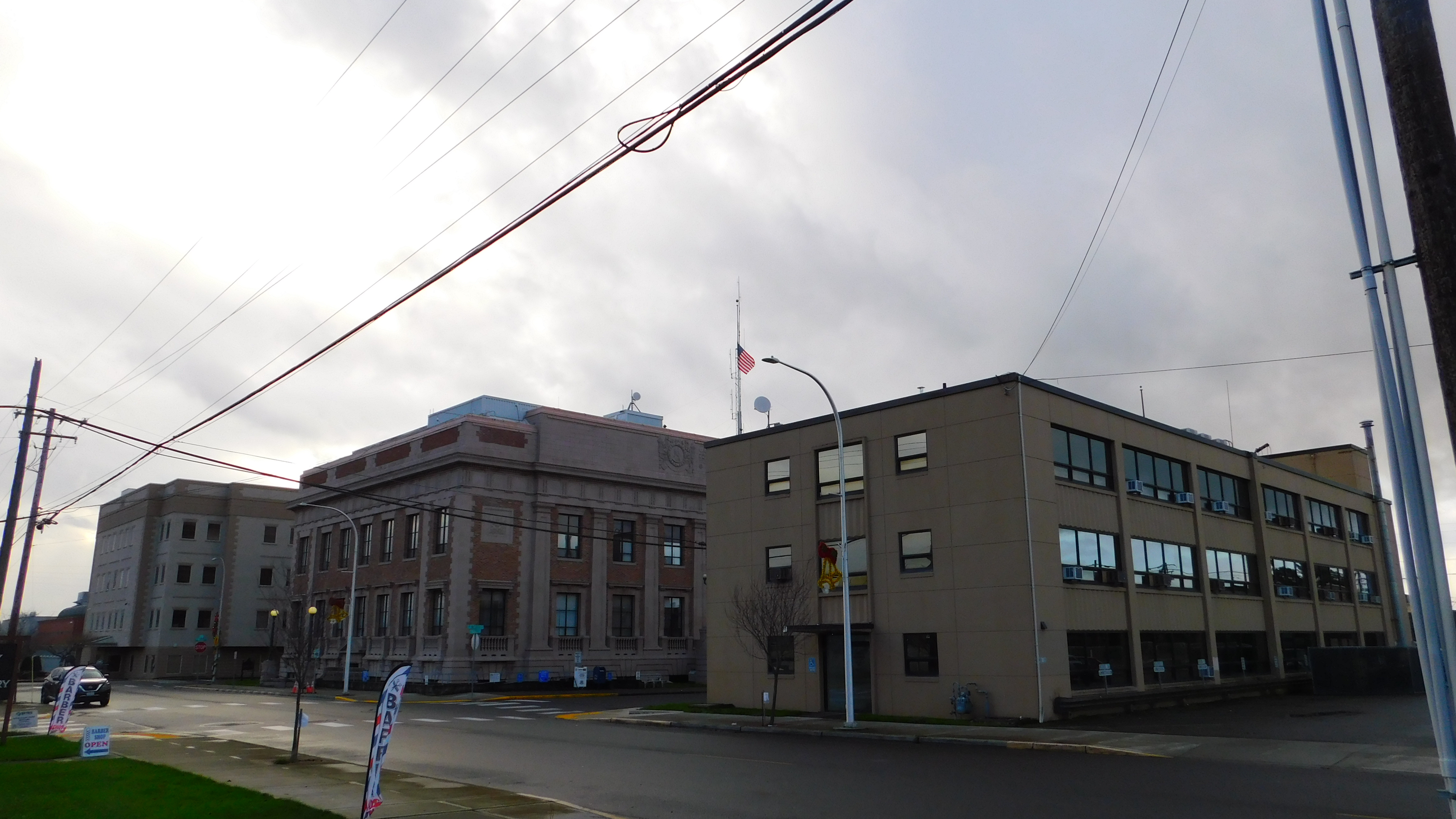
Courthouse campus, 2025

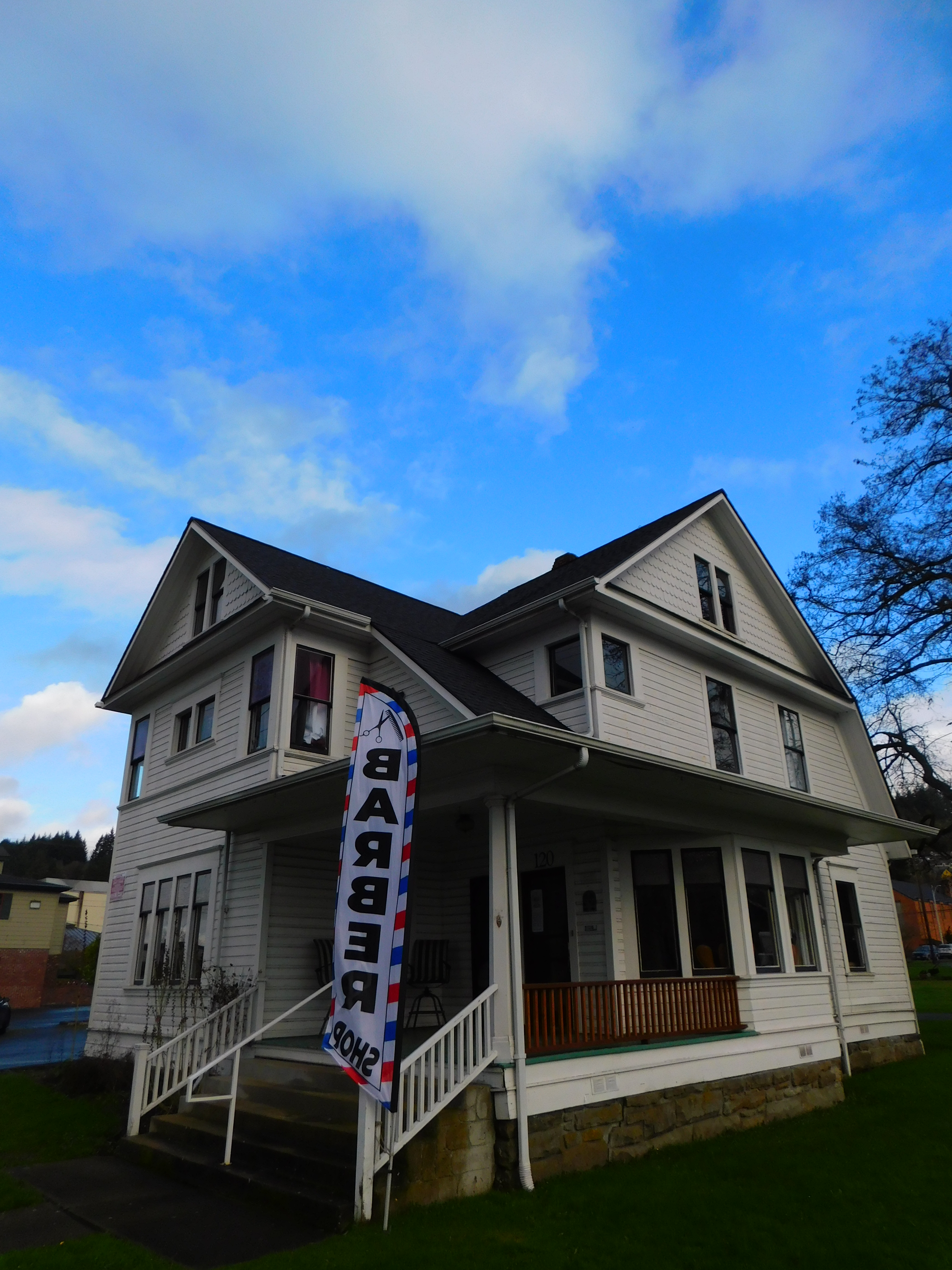
Judge Seymour White House, 2025

Across from the courthouse sits the Judge Seymour White House, a Victorian house built in 1904 that has been given the nickname, "House of Ill Repute", as it once was used as a brothel. The dwelling was planned for demolition in 1986 after it was deemed a public nuisance; a public outcry saved the home.

== Architecture and features ==
Unless otherwise noted, the details provided are based on the 2014 National Register of Historic Places (NRHP) nomination form and may not reflect updates or changes to the Lewis County Courthouse in the interim.

=== Exterior ===
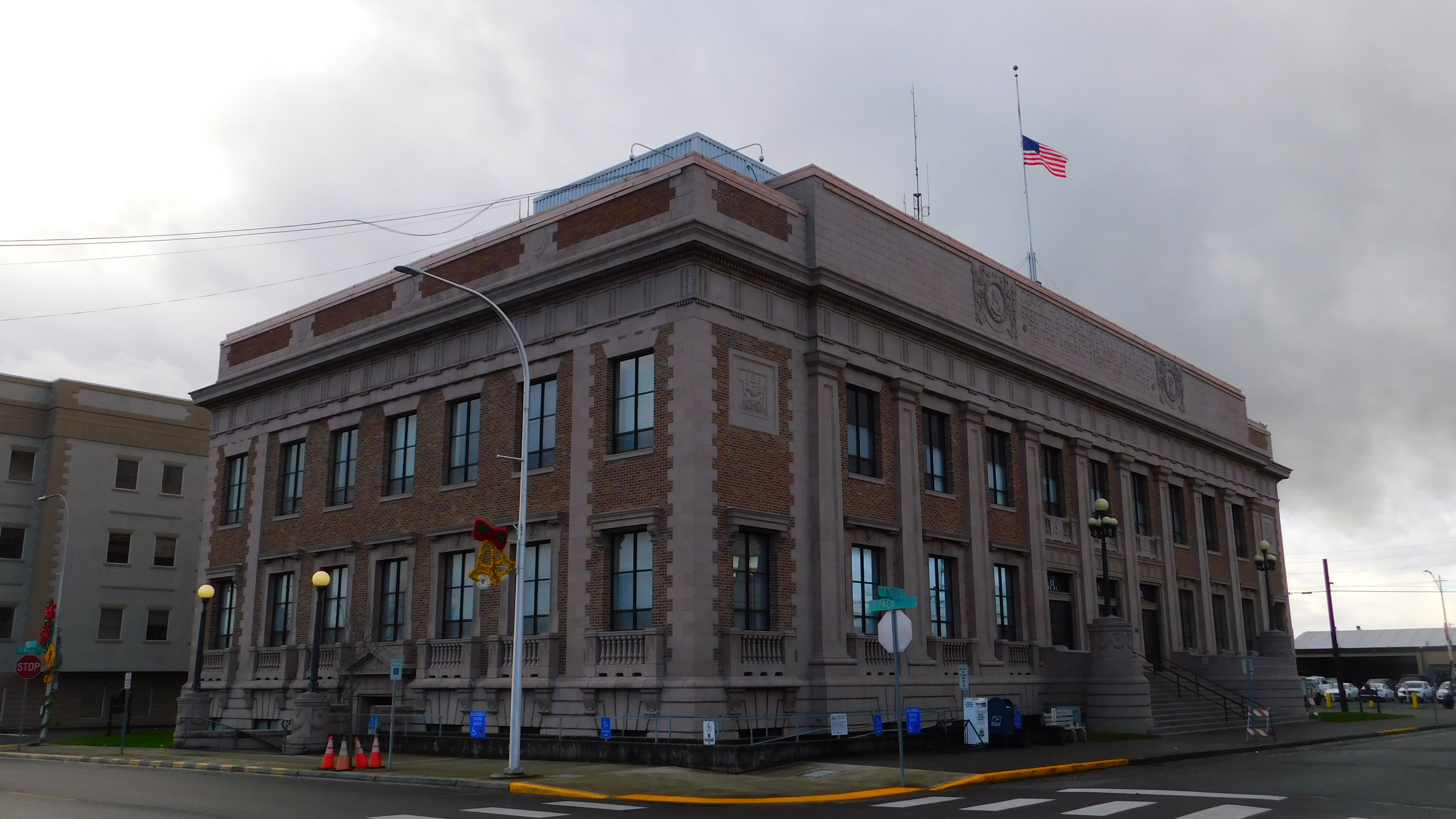
Northeast corner, 2025

The 4-story Lewis County Courthouse is considered a Beaux-Arts-style building with Doric order details. The footprint listed at 90 ft × 162 ft (27 m × 49 m). (Note: Initial reports from 1925 record the planned length of the new courthouse was to be 168 feet (51.2 m). Later reports often vary the size of the courthouse, such as measuring 93 ft × 167 ft (28 m × 51 m).) The foundation and walls were built on bedrock with steel reinforced concrete, the exterior is finished in sandstone, a bottom layer which casts a pink-grey hue. The sandstone was provided by the Pacific Stone Company of Seattle. The courthouse contains a daylight basement and three floors above ground level. A mezzanine is located on the north end of the courthouse between the second and third floors.

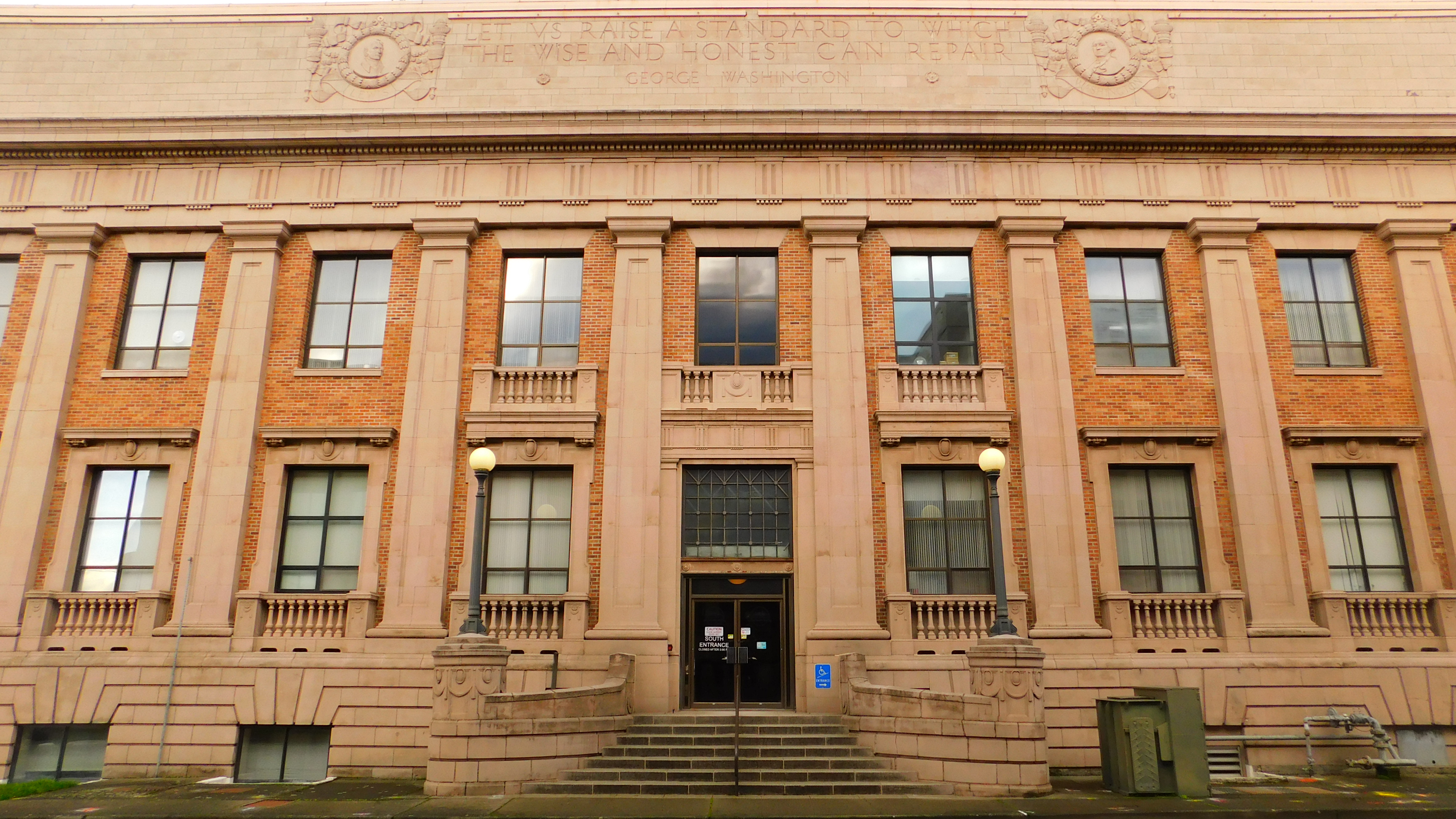
South entrance and inscription, 2025

Cast sandstone posts with curved walls encompass symmetrical and centered entrance stairs on all four sides of the courthouse. The main stairway entrances at the north, totaling 13 steps, and south, with 8 steps, are made of granite. A stairwell facing Pacific Avenue, as well as an ADA-modified ramp on North Street, access the basement level. Windows, no longer original, are double-paned and the casements include balustrades, pediments and sills made of stone. Window wells provide illumination to the basement floor. The original doors were made of bronze.

The roof is flat, constructed of concrete, and contains a skylight centered over the central interior staircase. Originally protected by tar and gravel, the roof was later upgraded to a modern method of weather protection and insulation.

Architectural details include Doric order pilasters as well as a cornices, a parapet that hides a windowless attic, and triglyphs. A small window is hidden under the parapet at the location of the courthouse jail, allowing in some light to the cells while providing a security measure against escape. Bas relief portraits carved out of sandstone are featured on the building. The bust of Meriwether Lewis is located on the east side and the sculptured portrait of George Washington is located on the west wall. Carved inscriptions in Roman lettering are located on the parapets of the courthouse:

North side inscription

COVRTHOVSE OF THE COVNTY OF LEWIS
ERECTED BY THE PEOPLE AND DEDICATED
TO THE ADVANCEMENT OF JVSTICE

South side inscription

LET VS RAISE A STANDARD TO WHICH
THE WISE AND HONEST CAN REPAIR
GEORGE WASHINGTON

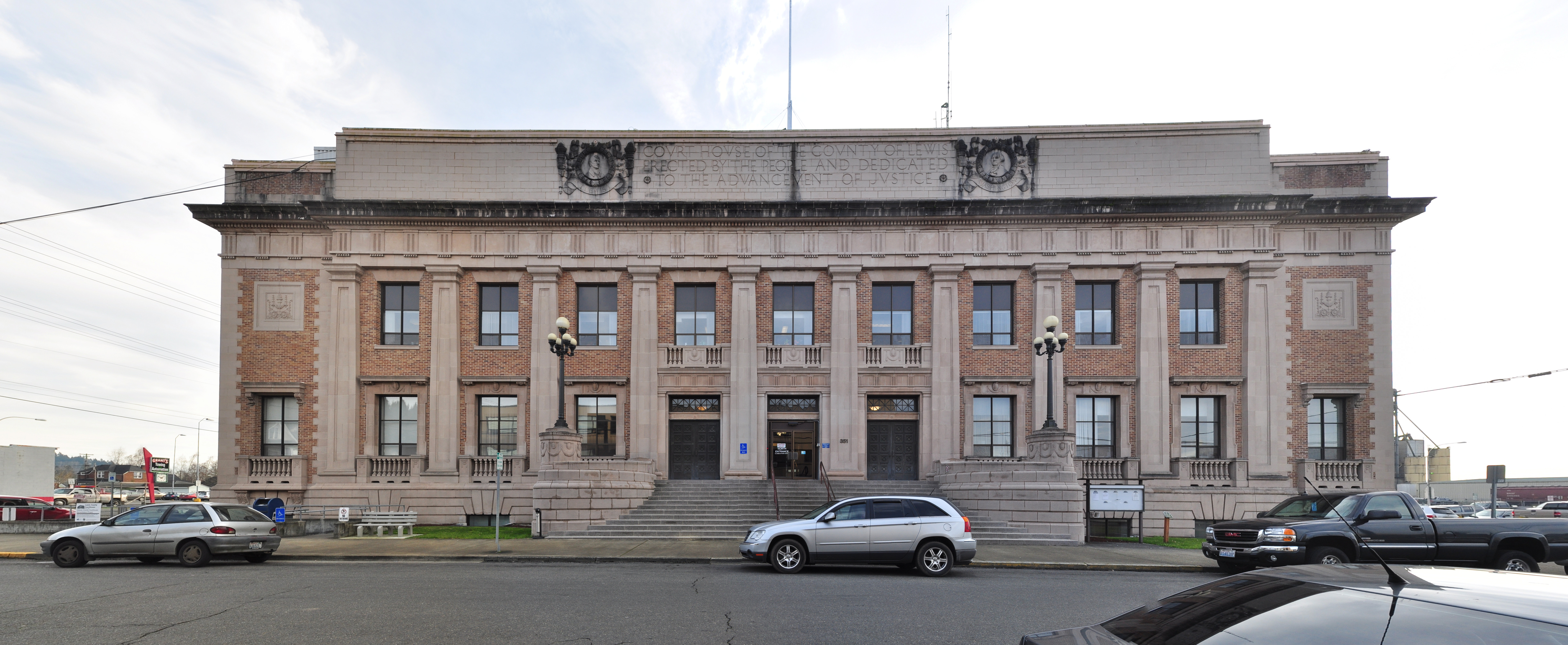
Lewis County Courthouse, north entrance, 2015

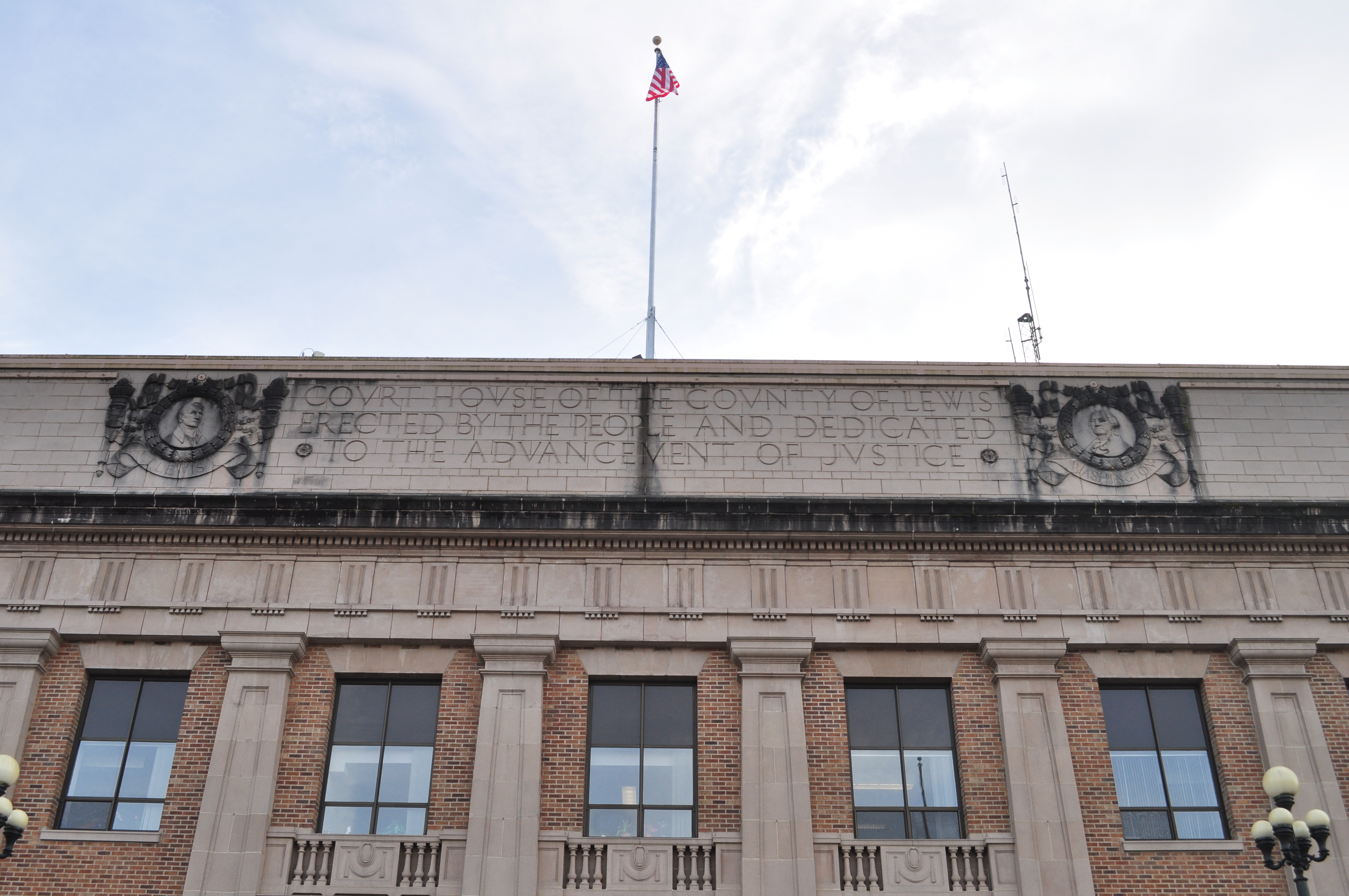
North parapet inscription

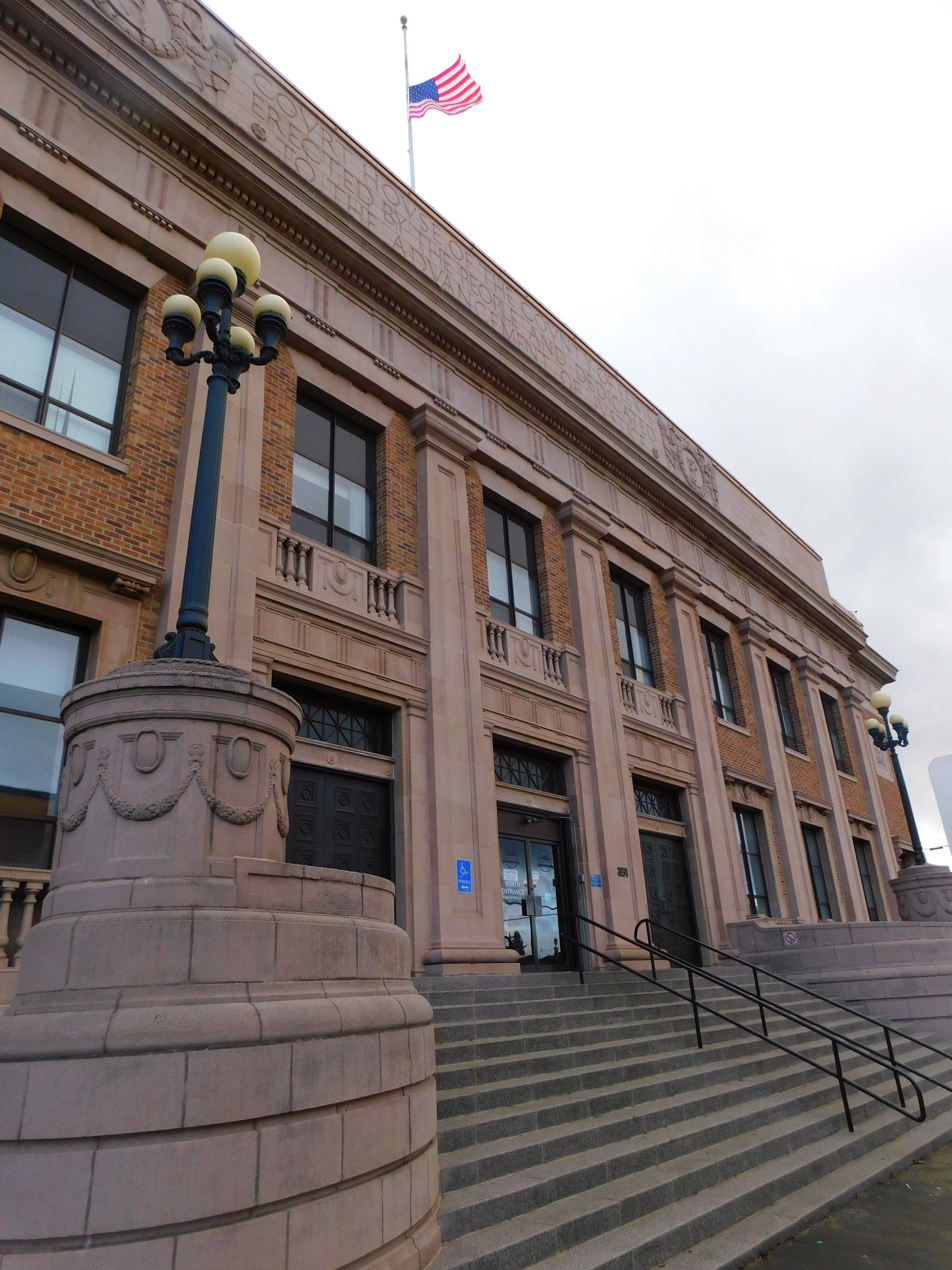
North entrance stairwell and details, 2025

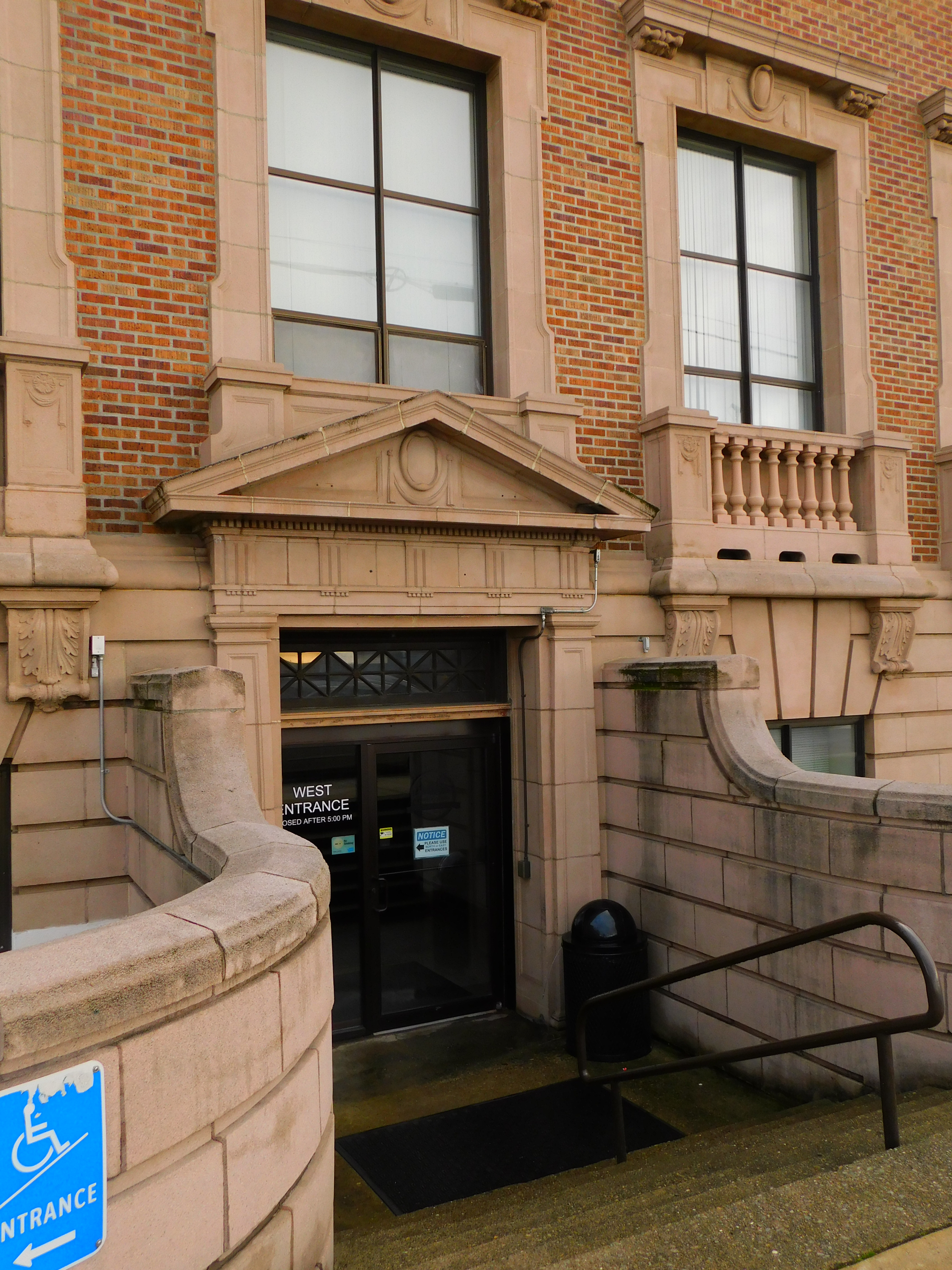
West entrance, 2025

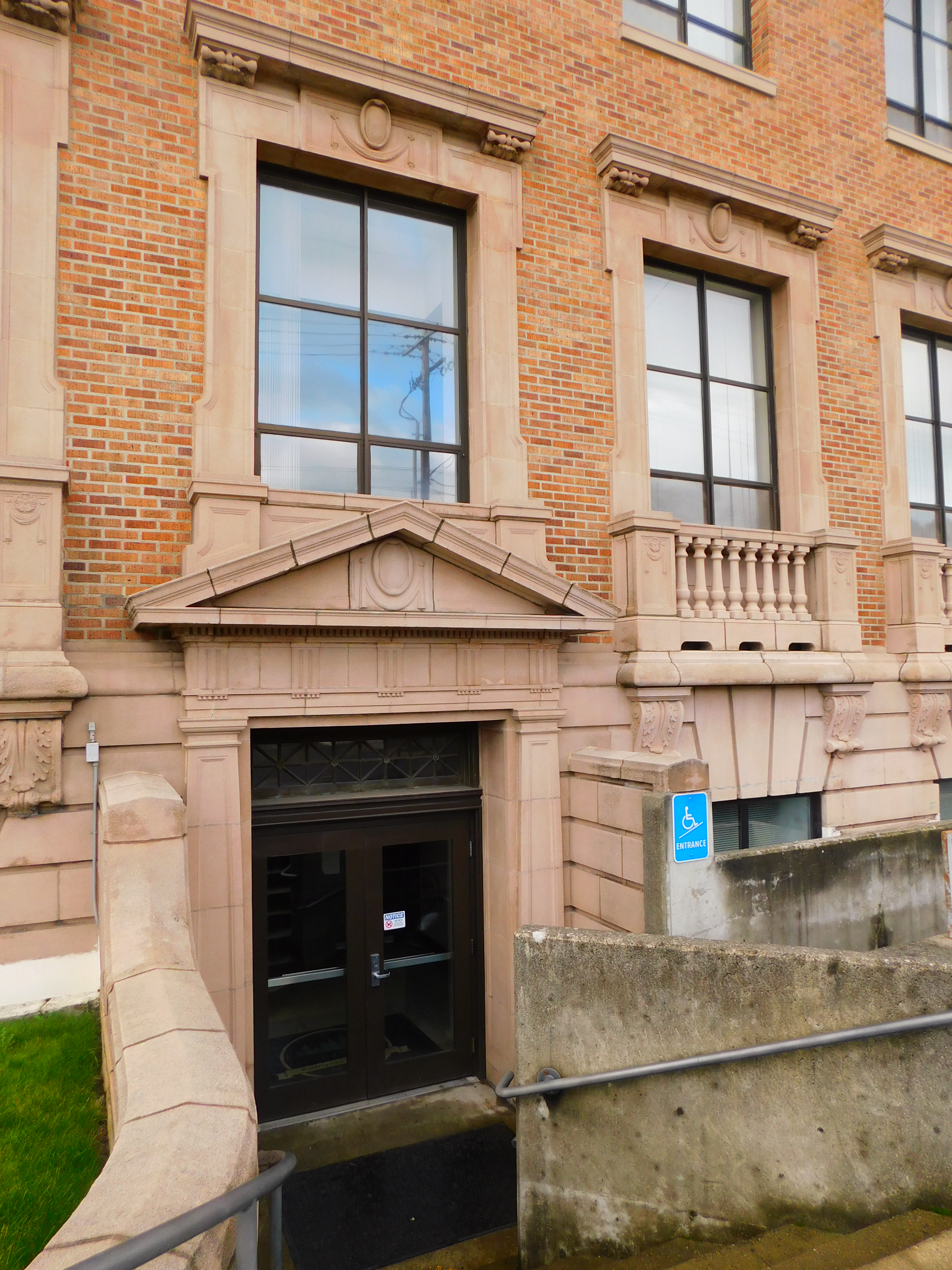
East entrance, 2025

=== Interior ===
The basement and main floors are listed as each being 14,670 square feet (1,363 m^{2}) in size. The attic space is lesser, registering 10,656 square feet (990.0 m^{2}) and the mezzanine listed as the smallest floor at 2,500 square feet (230 m^{2}). The first floor contains the highest ceilings. Walls are either plastered terra cotta or gypsum in California stucco-style. Millwork includes original mahogany trim which was carved to match features seen in the plaster walls. The floors of the public areas, as well as the main staircase and basement, are terrazzo with brass dividers. Exterior details are duplicated in the interior spaces, including egg-and-dart moldings, modillions, and finials.

At the time of the NRHP nomination, mahogany benches, once used in the courtrooms, were still in use, placed in lobby areas. The interior is painted in colors from the 1920s and 1930s period. A bronze sculpture panel of Meriwether Lewis, created by Seattle artist James A. Wehn, is located in the main corridor. A telephone booth, "where information is always available", is also in the main hall.

The central staircase, providing access from the main floor to the mezzanine, totals 64 steps. The stairs between the first and second floors feature a central staircase flanked by two stairwells. The section contains bas relief rosettes and the top floor illuminated by the skylight. A separate set of staircases to the basement flanks the central well on the main corridor.

The courthouse contains two elevators, one of which is for the public. A new public lift was installed in 2001.

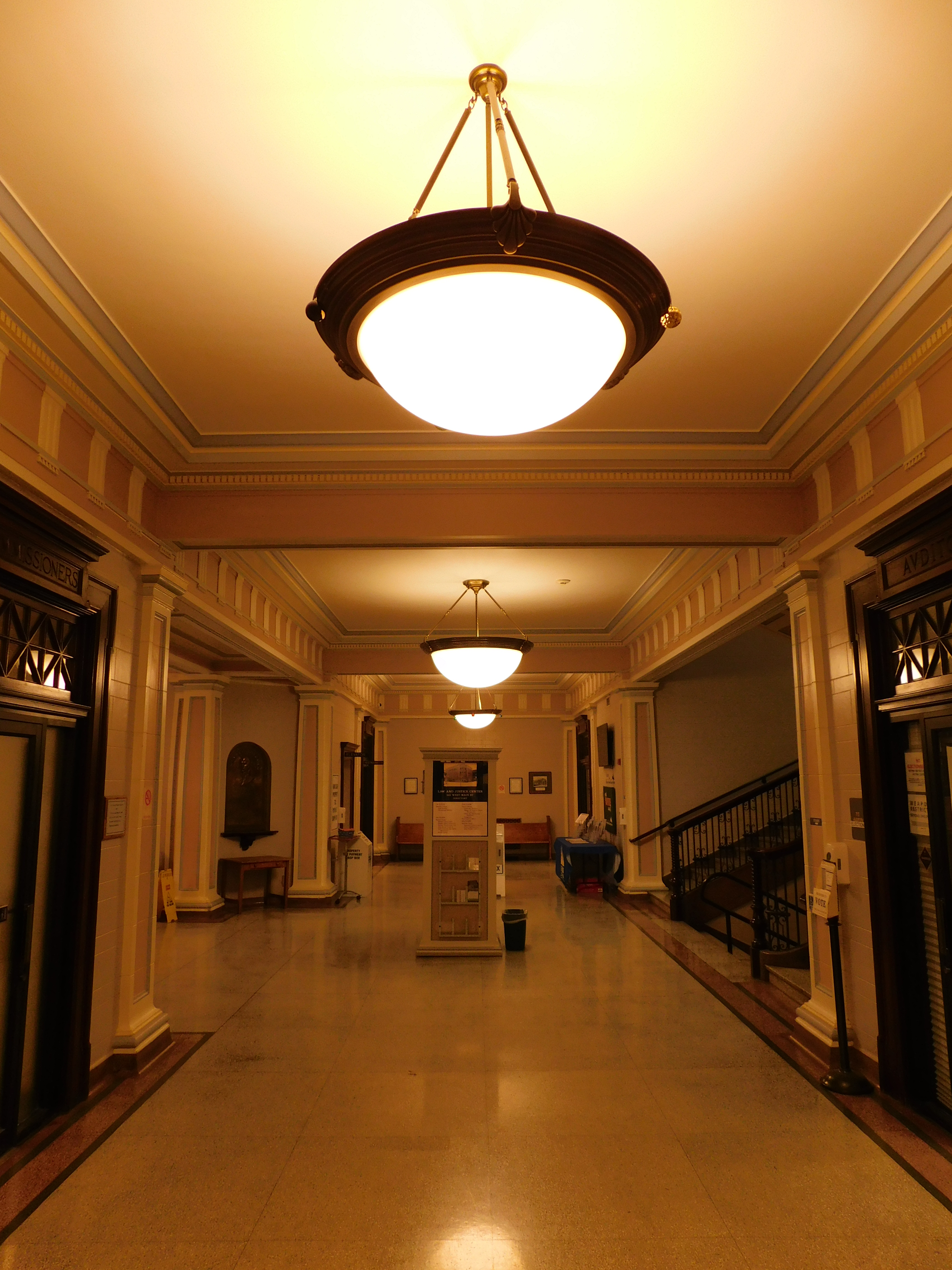
Main hall, 2024

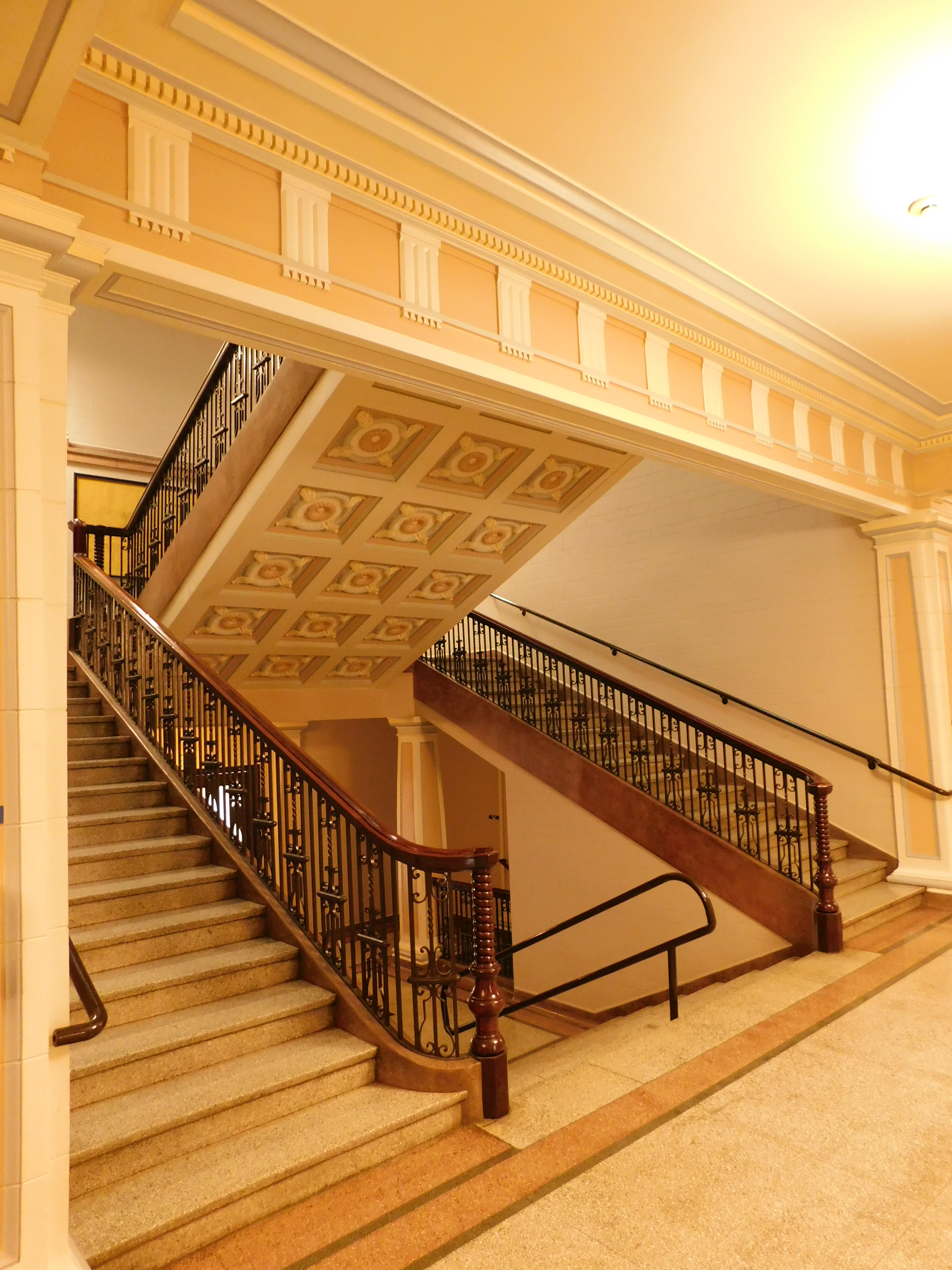
Main staircase, 2nd floor

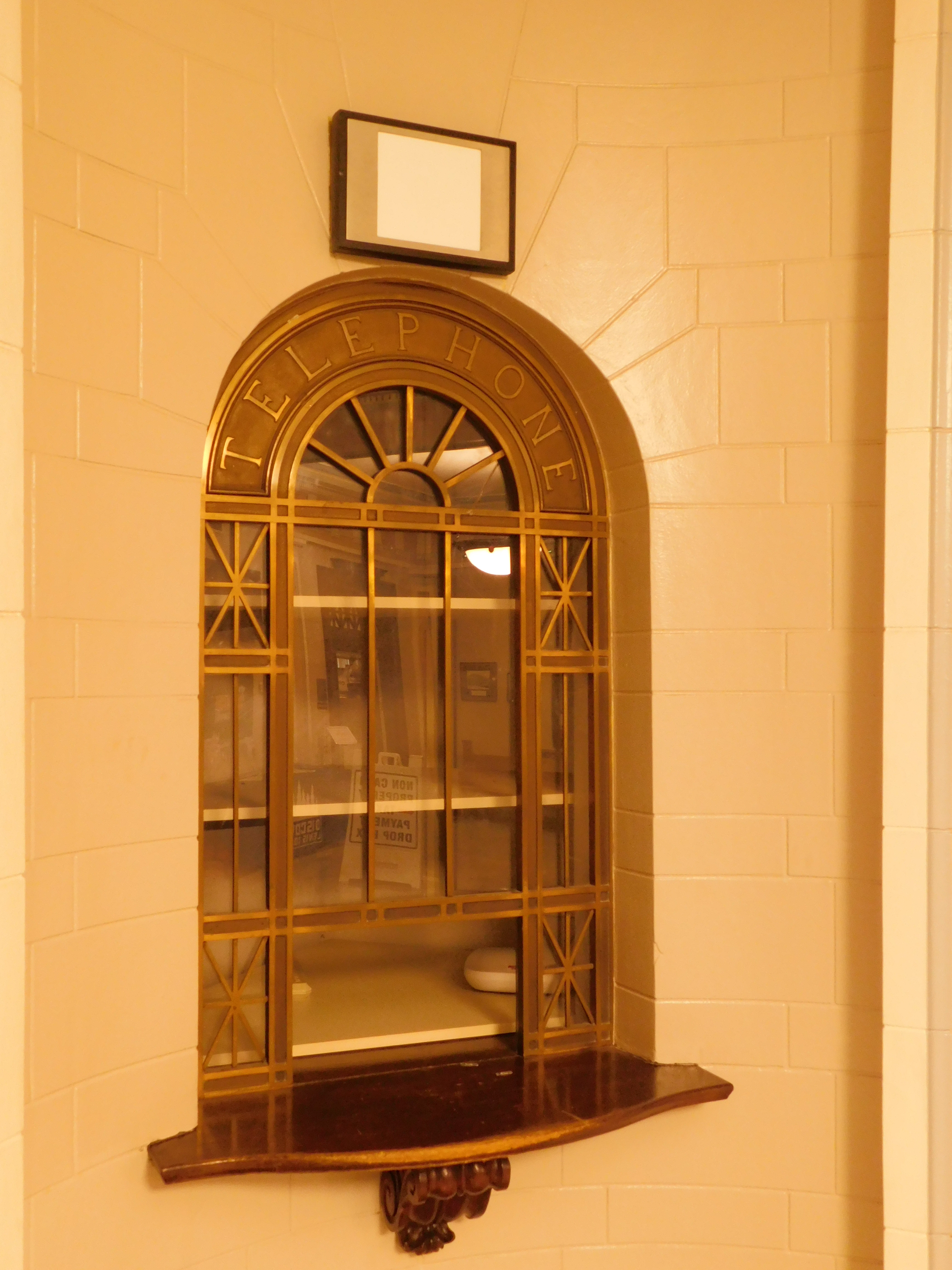
Telephone booth

=== Jail ===
The jail area, measuring 40 ft × 50 ft (12 m × 15 m), and cells were built by the Pauly Jail Building Company of St. Louis, Missouri. The cells were constructed to provide separate units specifically for more violent offenders and contained unconnected cells for women and youths, a specification stemming from jail issues at the Barrett Block Courthouse that allowed older prisoners to mingle with younger, more "tender conscience" criminals. The original partitioned jail cell space contained a bullpen and a solitary confinement room. Additionally, there were rooms for employees, jury sleeping quarters, and a doctor's office with an operating room. At the time of the dedication, escape from the jail was reported as "practically impossible".

The jail cells were reported by 2008 as replaced by office space and used as both a storage area and a location for housing duct work. Three cells remained, as well as a bank of wall phones.

=== Original floor plans ===
The basement floor contained office space for various county government agencies such as agriculture, fairgrounds, fire, health, hunting and gaming, the school superintendent, and space for a tuberculosis nurse. The basement also included two vaults for records and the sheriff; the sheriff's vault housed illicit alcohol seized during the Prohibition era. Coal was stored in the basement, powering two 600 lb (270 kg) boliers, and the space also provided a blueprint room for engineering and amenities for employees.

The first floor was home to other county government departments, including the assessor, auditor, treasurer, and offices of the county commissioners. The corridor was fashioned as a large public lobby that included a telephone booth and a north and south vestibule. The second floor was home to two courtrooms, the smallest measuring 36 ft × 50 ft (11 m × 15 m) and the larger at 46 ft × 70 ft (14 m × 21 m). Rooms included chambers for judges and offices for attorneys, the county clerk, and the sheriff.

The mezzanine level, between the first and second floors, was the location of the courthouse's law library and rooms for the court bailiff, deputies, and juries. The top floor, also known as the attic or jail floor were accessed separately from the central staircase, including an elevator from the basement.

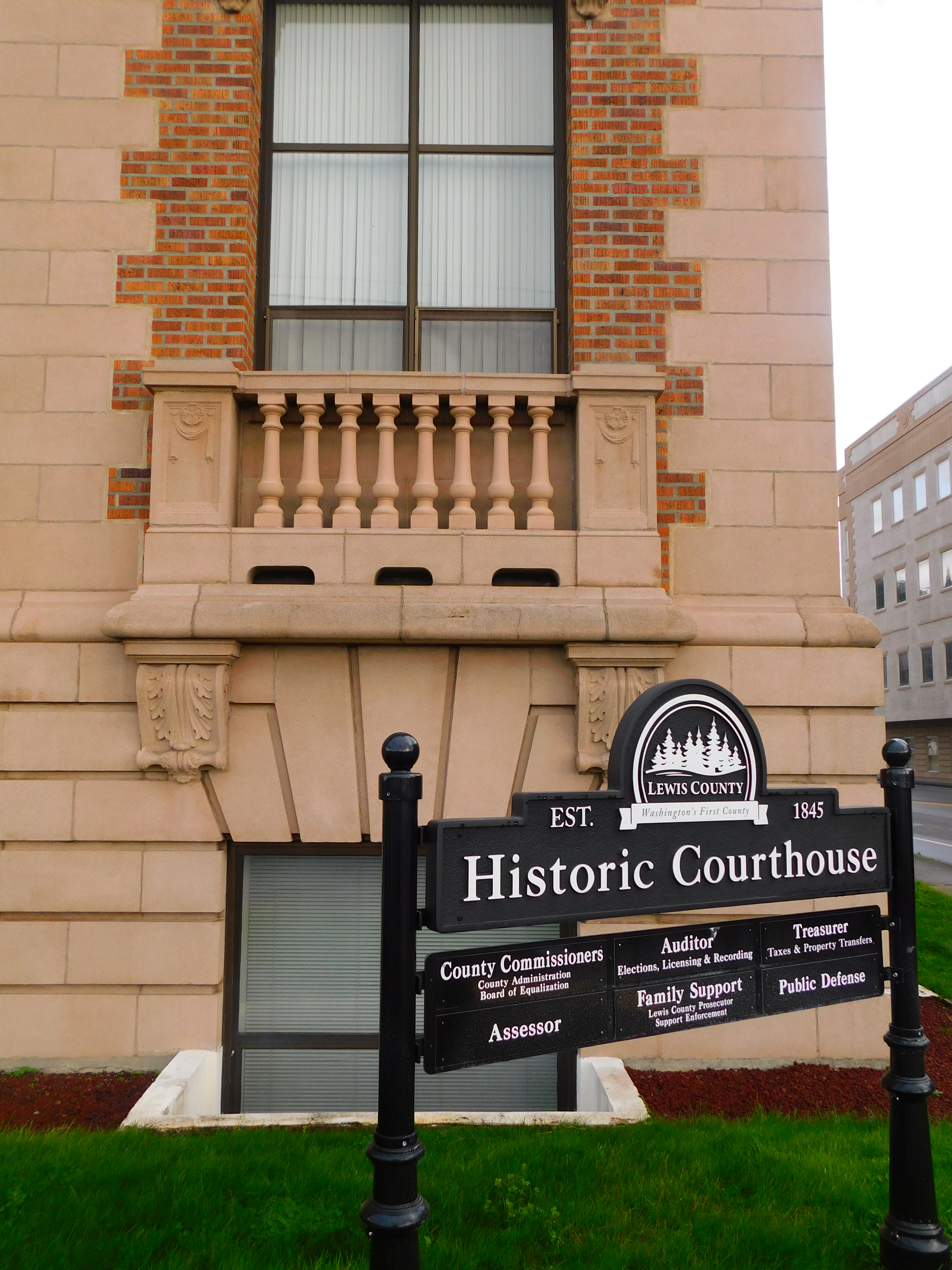
East side sign and exterior details, 2025

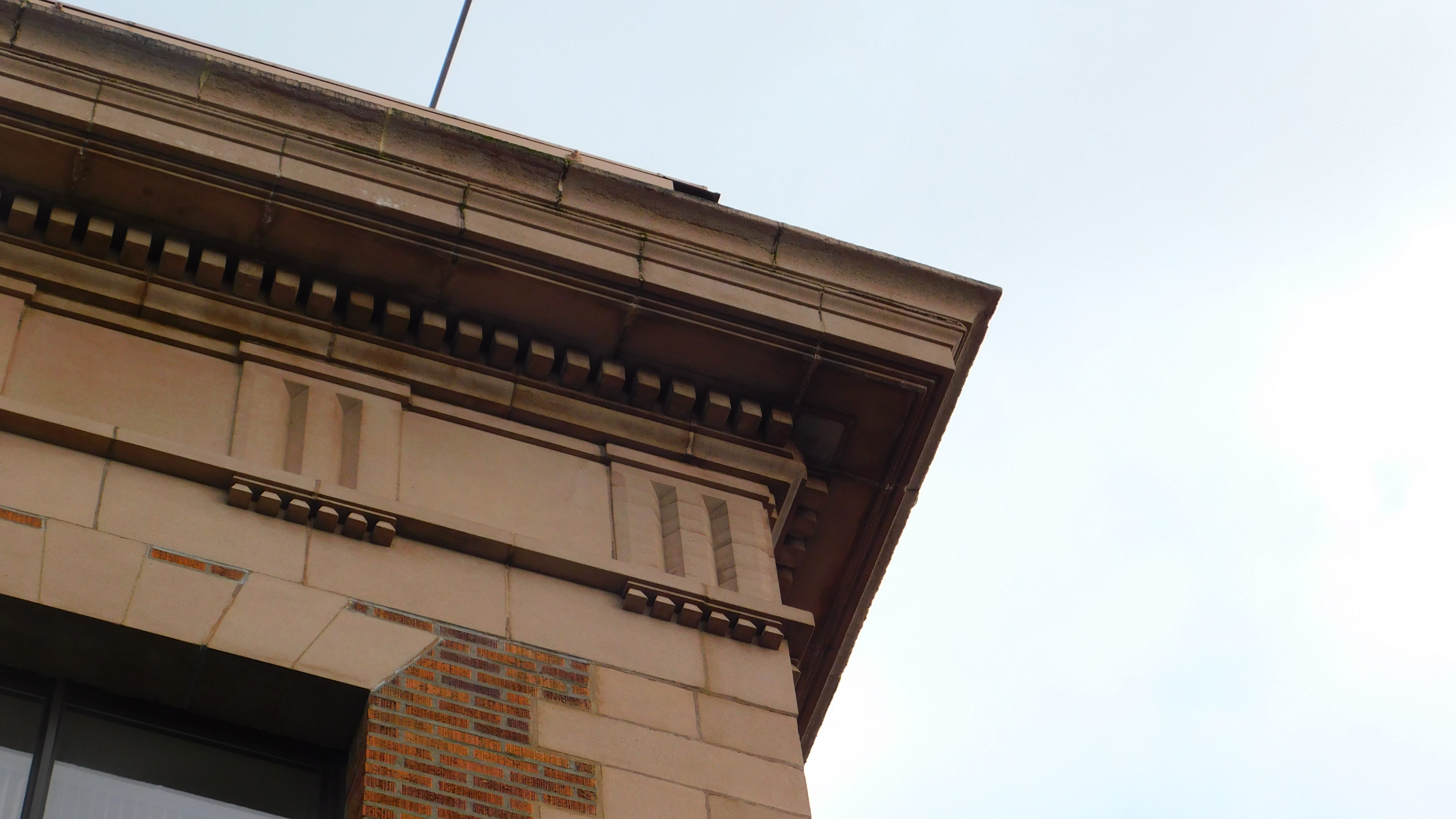
Cornice and frieze details, 2025

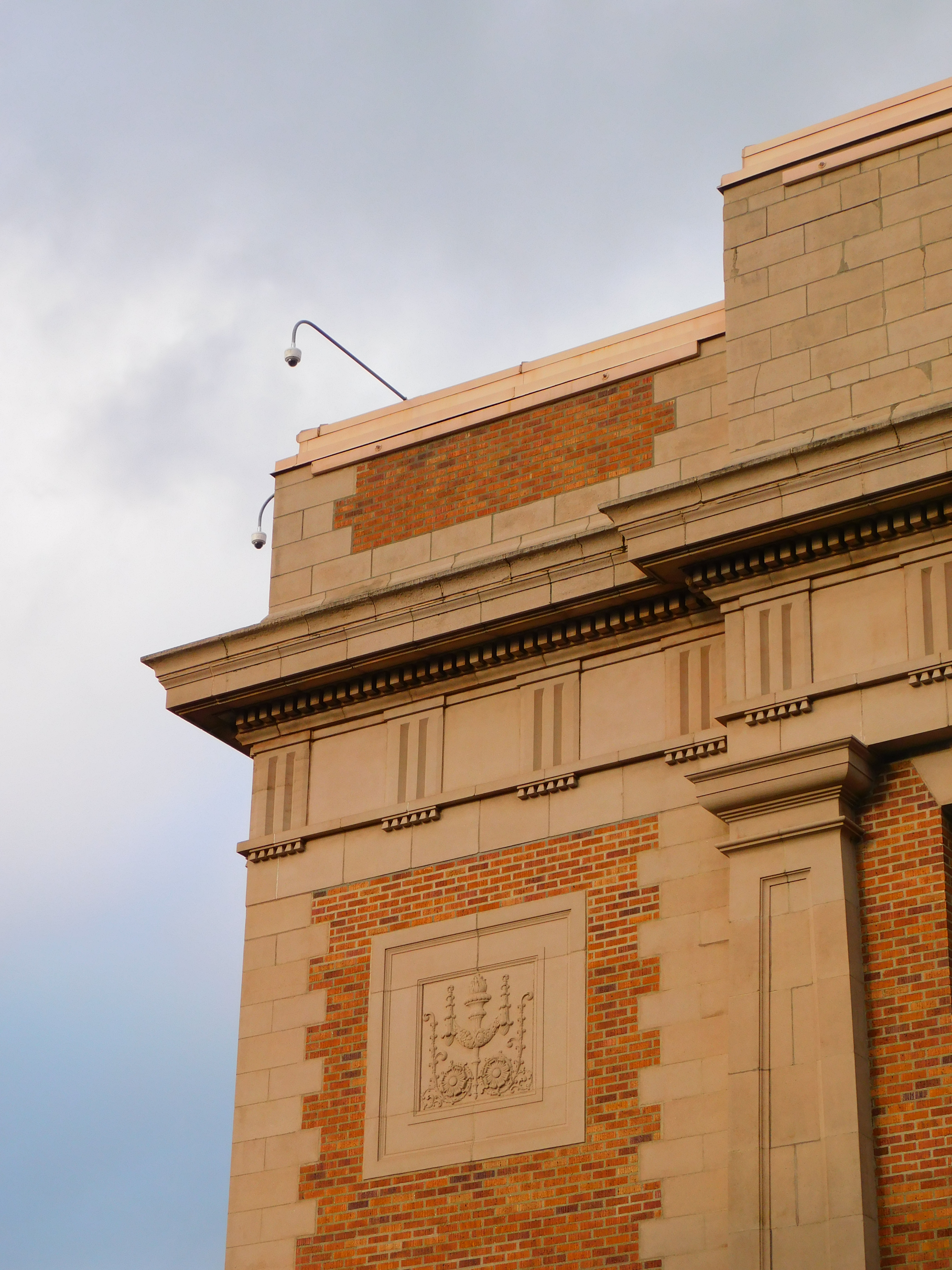
Parapet and bas relief details, 2025

==== Contractors ====
The John Dower Lumber Company of Tacoma supplied a large amount of construction material, including 100,000 feet (30,480.0 m) of lumber and 160 metric tons (160 t) tons of plaster. Walls were plastered by Seattle-based California Stucco Company.

The early heat and ventilation system was installed by Hastford-Lord, Inc. of Portland; the system was designed under specifications from the architect, Griffin, by Northwest Engineer Company of Seattle. Electrical systems were installed by Chehalis Electric Company and its contractor, Max Chaney.

Furnishings and office equipment, at a cost of over $17,000, were supplied by the Bookstore of Olympia, which included $5,600 steel countertops manufactured by Globe Wernicke. Original hardware was supplied by a western Washington firm, Power & Williams. Millwork was provided by Seattle-based Puget Sound Manufacturing Company.

== Renovations and restorations ==
=== Annexes ===
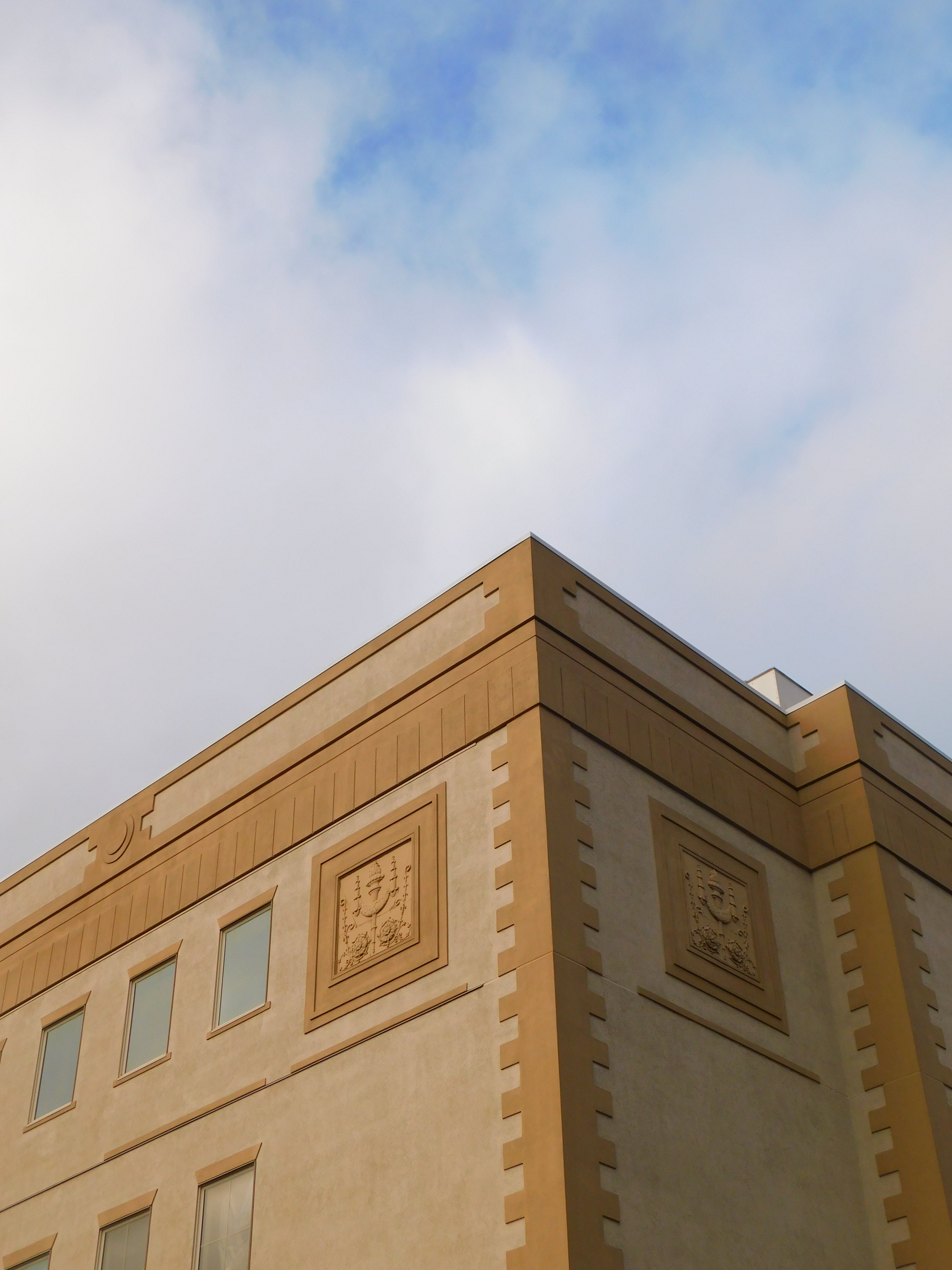
Law and Justice Center, exterior details, 2025

The county's Health Department was moved to the Lewis County Courthouse Annex in 1954. After one of the courtrooms was remodeled in 1961, split in half after a new district court was authorized, the new judiciary moved to the annex. A second Superior Court courtroom forced another move in 1975. After the completion of the Lewis County Law and Justice Center, constructed to house the growing county government, several agencies in the courthouse were transferred to the new annex.

During the 1995-2003 campus-wide renovation project, the 1970s addition, known simply as the Courthouse Annex at the time, underwent an almost $1.4 million remodel which included the construction of two courtrooms with judge's quarters, plus a jury room and additional office space on the third floor. The floor had remained empty and unused since the annex was built.

The south annex became known officially as the Lewis County Law and Justice Center in 2003.

=== Courthouse ===
==== 20th century ====
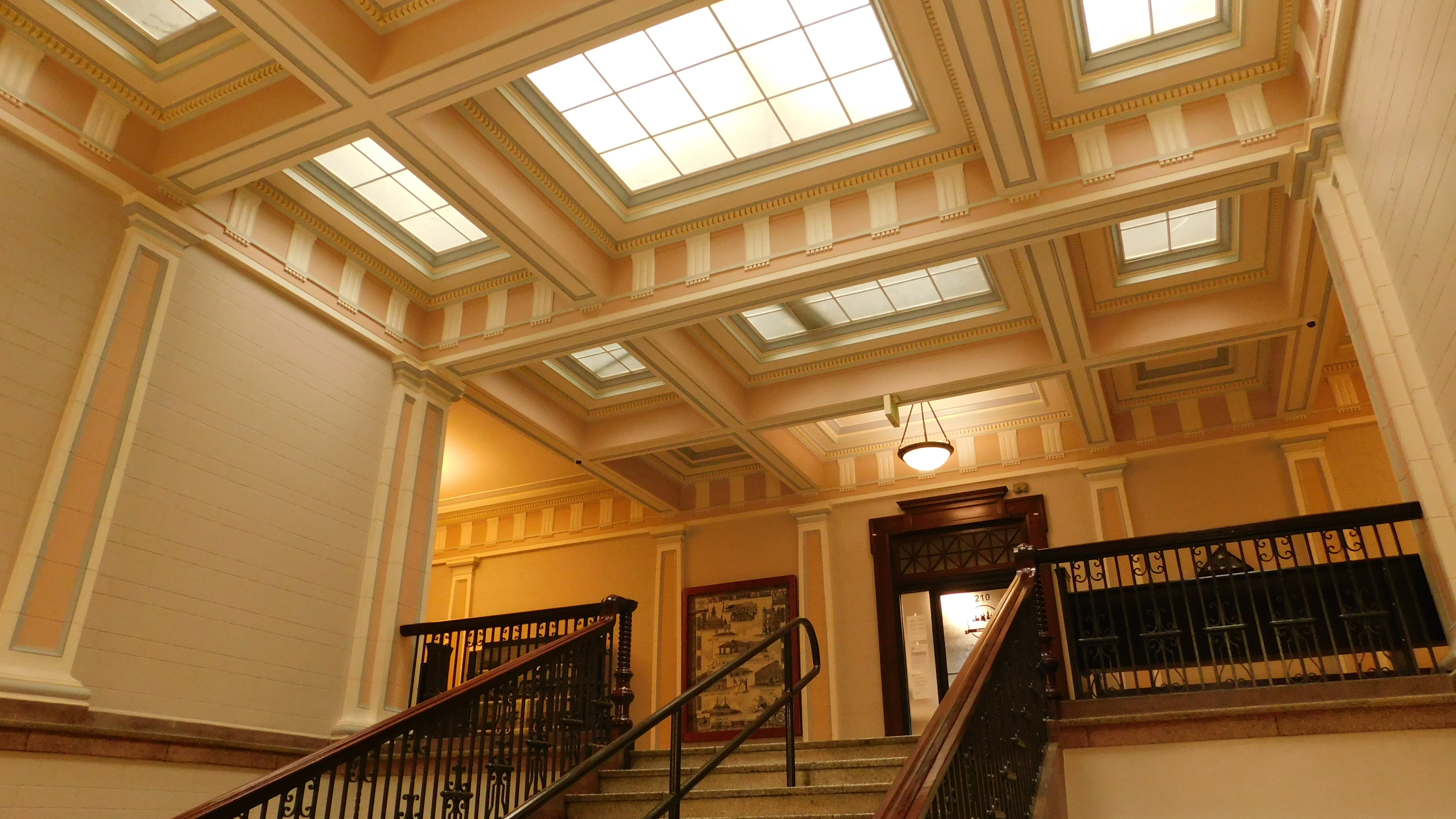
Third floor skylight

One of the earliest renovation needs for the courthouse was attempted in 1950 for the addition of a woman's employee lounge and restroom, as no dedicated bathroom for women existed in the building. The plans met with large opposition, which included a local grange and parent–teacher association, deeming the costs exorbitant and funds better spent on educational needs. The female employees were deemed "selfish" and "out to get what they want regardless of the need of others". Delays spanned into 1951 with additional concerns of loss of office space and functional use. The parapet was renovated in 1957. Considered "extensive", the courthouse roofing was also repaired.

A project for tuck pointing and cleaning of the exterior, along with painting and damp proofing, was started in 1960. Electrical wiring in the building, reported as "outmoded and inadequate", was replaced beginning in May 1962. The courthouse often suffered from blown fuses and prior attempts at rewiring led to overheated systems. Four windows facing the train tracks west of the courthouse were bricked-over in 1967 in an attempt to mitigate railroad noise.

The Superior courtroom underwent a renovation after a $100,000 loss caused by an arson fire in September 1973. The basement elevator was overhauled beginning in early 1976, enlarging the lift with a handicap-accessible ramp installed on Pacific Avenue. New sliding glass doors, at a cost of over $2,400, were installed in February 1976, but the doors were not allowed to be used as they failed to meet state fire codes. Known as the "Commissioners' Folly", the board failed to obtain a building permit which would have notified them in advance that the doors could not have been installed. A skybridge was constructed during the 1970s annex build to allow for easier passage of employees and inmates between the courthouse and the south annex.

The move of some courtrooms and agencies to the Courthouse Annex in the late 1970s allowed for the expansion of law and legal department spaces in the courthouse. Jury rooms were added immediately next to the courtrooms and the law library was moved to the mezzanine level. The changes allowed the courthouse to be in compliance with the Americans with Disabilities Act of 1990. A courtroom that had been decreased by half its original size was restored to its former footprint.

In 1990, the exterior was steam cleaned, and efforts were made to restore the masonry and make repairs to the stairways. A third courtroom was constructed on the second floor in 1993.

A large overhaul of the courthouse and annexes, with a listed cost of $7.5 million, (Note: The 1995-2003 renovation cost associated specifically to the courthouse was recorded at $3 million.) began in 1995 and lasted until March 2003 when the courthouse held a rededication ceremony. After what was to be only a project focused on light fixture replacement and repainting of the interior back to the courthouse's original colors, (Note: The interior public spaces had at some point been painted in mustard yellow.) additional renovations were undertaken without a master plan, which included upgrades to the electrical, heating and ventilation, and wiring the building for the internet. The renovation project was extended to include repairs, mostly to the plaster, after the 2001 Nisqually earthquake; the building did not experience any structural damage. The county consolidated all law enforcement, which included the courts, jail, and offices of the prosecuting attorneys and sheriff, at the Law and Justice Center. All county administrative agencies were moved into the courthouse. This change authored in the remodeling of several interior offices, (Note: Names of the original courthouse offices, which were carved into the wooden archways, were kept and most administrative divisions no longer matched the name, such as the County Commissioner under "Sheriff" or the Lewis County Assessor in the original County Clerk location.) a restoration of the façade, and the skyway was removed. The painting, as well as other renovations of decor and lighting, was overseen by a Courthouse Refurbishment Committee which focused on highlighting the design of the architectural design and flourishes.

==== 21st century ====
At the end of the efforts in 2003, the courthouse's occupancy layout had almost completely changed. The Superior Courtroom became a public meeting hall for the county commissioners, several offices were relocated to the second floor and replaced areas once occupied by the court system, and remaining agencies expanded their space. Despite the extensive renovations, the only footprint changes were two expansions for areas regarding the county dispatch center and 911, and a director's office.

Another restoration of the exterior began in 2007 mostly due to weather damage and the after-effects of the removal of the skybridge. Sandstone-cast blocks were replaced, bricks were repointed, and window sills on the west section of the second floor were replaced. Entrance lighting that was originally planned for the courthouse, but never realized, was installed during the 2007 project. A smaller restoration to repair the ridge cap and the elevator shaft accessible from the outside were completed in 2009.

The 2010s included several maintenance and restoration projects. A comprehensive restoration began in 2014 via a $75,000 grant from the Washington State Department of Archaeology and Historic Preservation (DAHP). The project, which included fixes to prevent water intrusion, included pressure washing, repointing, and replacements of several window balustrades,. The effort was budgeted at over $160,000. The restoration was necessary due to masonry deterioration and a build up of dust and mildew, considered to be a fault of nearby factories. The public elevator, out of commission for several months after a computer failure, was repaired in 2016 at a cost of $80,000. The following year, water leaks and subsequent mold growth necessitated a roof repair estimated to cost over $100,000.

Masonry work, as well as the replacement of doors in the basement, were undertaken in 2020 after a $100,000 grant from the DAHP. Beginning in 2022, the courthouse began receiving county and state funding, including grants from the Washington State Historic County Courthouse Program, for restoration of the exterior façade. In 2025, mortar repairs were undertaken on the sandstone exterior, particularly the north and east walls. Funding was extended into 2027 to finish the south façade as well as for updates to the building's fire alarm system. The funds totaled $785,000 which included credits for prior restoration efforts at the courthouse.

== Artworks and displays ==
After the 1995-2003 renovation, the original United States flag that flew over the Claquato Courthouse was found and put on display. The 35-star flag, with a size described as "half the size of a school gym", had been stored away in a state museum for over seven decades.

Located at the Lewis County Law and Justice Center is a bronze statue known as The Guardian. Created to honor local police officers who lost their lives in the line of duty, the artwork depicts a little girl along with an officer and a police dog.

== Significance ==
The National Register of Historic Places (NRHP) considered the Lewis County Courthouse to be "directly associated with events that have made a significant contribution to the broad patterns of the growth, development and industry of Lewis County". The building was also noted for its connection with architect, Jack deForest Griffin, and how the courthouse is an example of his work. Additional notes of significance include the courthouse representing the first major expenditure by the county for a court building and the "permanence of its construction". The NRHP lists the span from 1927, the year the courthouse was dedicated, to 1954, when the building began its shift from law, legal, and county purpose for strictly county government function, as the most significant portion of the courthouse's history. The courthouse was officially added to the NRHP on August 18, 2014.

The architectural style has been described as "a symbol of corporate wealth and civic pride" and grants supported by the Washington State Department of Archaeology and Historic Preservation during the 2010s were based on preserving the historic character of the structure.

The courthouse was added two months earlier to the Washington State Heritage Register in June 2014. Led by efforts of the Lewis County Historical Society and Museum, the nomination focused on the depot's history and importance to the city and the region.

As of 2014, the courthouse's rebuild value was listed at approximately $140,000,000 million.

== Lewis County Law and Justice Center ==
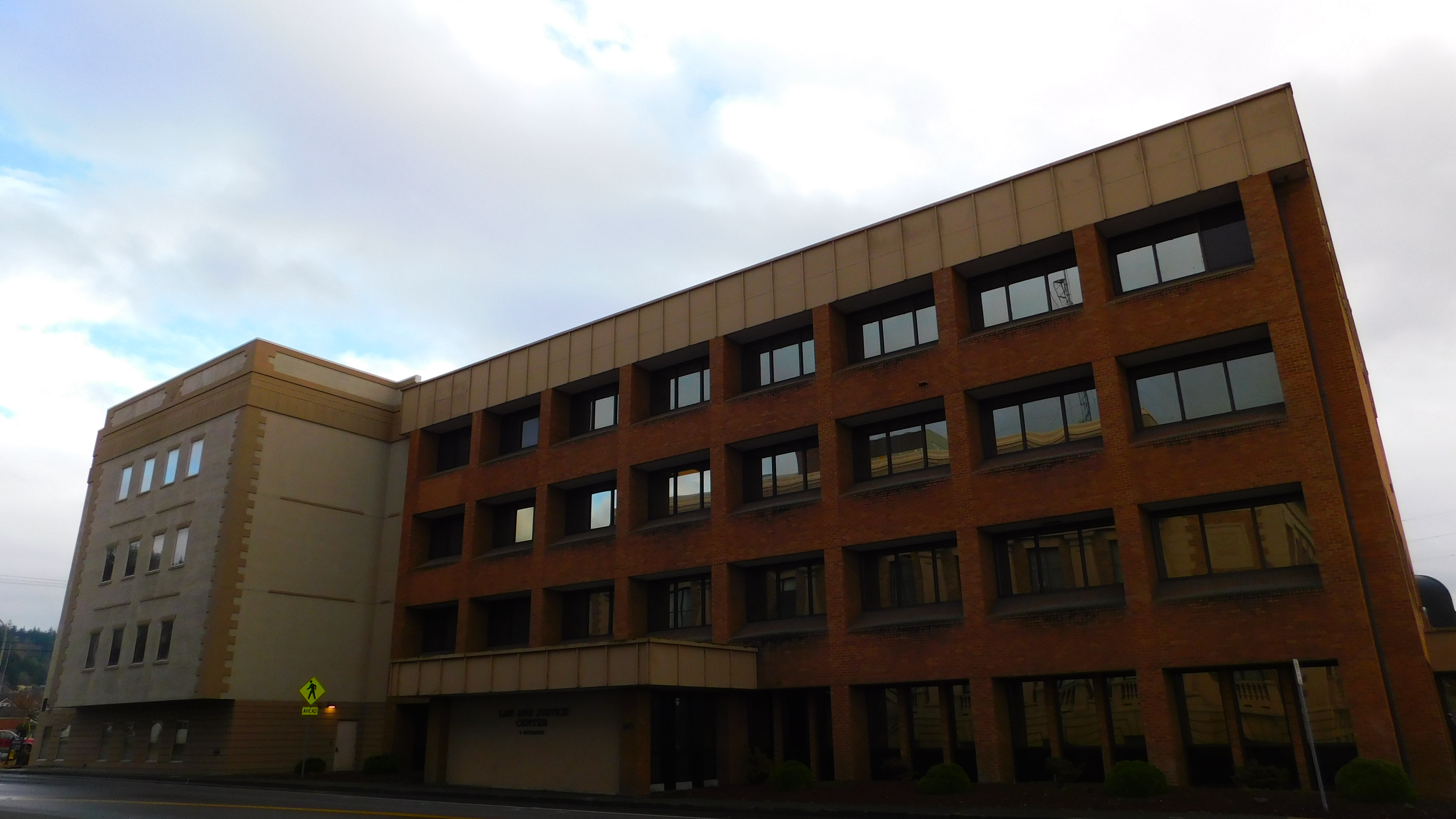
Lewis County Law and Justice Center, 2025

After a 2000 renovation of the 1977 annex, known then as the Lewis County Courthouse Annex, the facility was renamed as the Lewis County Law and Justice Center in June. During the remodel, all offices pertaining to law and justice were shifted to the annex. The project was part of a larger $36.7 million plan, later reduced, for county government buildings on the campus.

== Lewis County Jail ==
The Lewis County Jail expansion started in 1994 and was planned to abut the Law and Justice Center. The facilities opened in February 1996. By 2000, the annex jail facility was significantly exceeding its limits. A Quonset hut was used as inmate quarters beginning in late 2000.

In December 2001, the county approved another jail expansion. Able to house up to 356 prisoners, the Lewis County Jail opened on October 13, 2004.
