= R. W. Buzzard =

American jurist

Hon. R. W. Buzzard

Judge of the Lewis County District Court

Personal details
- Citizenship: United States
- Education: Seattle University (J.D.); City University of Seattle (MBA); Eastern Washington University (B.A.)
- Profession: Judge

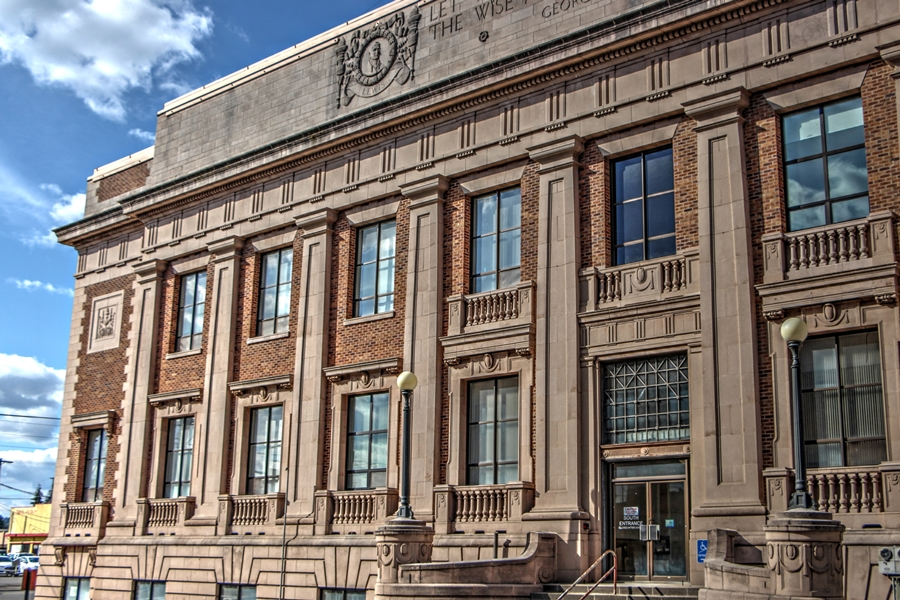
The historic Lewis County Courthouse.

R. W. Buzzard is an American jurist who, as of 2019, is a judge of the District Court of Lewis County, a rural county in the state of Washington. Buzzard has criticized the adequacy of court security in Washington and, on several occasions, has descended from the bench to personally restrain criminal defendants attempting to flee.

== Early life and education ==
R. W. Buzzard is the son of Steve Buzzard, a former judge of the municipal court of Chehalis, Washington, and Missy Buzzard, the town's former mayor. He graduated from Centralia High School and Eastern Washington University, and later earned a Juris Doctor cum laude from the Seattle University School of Law. He also has a Master of Business Administration from City University of Seattle.

== Career ==
R.W. Buzzard was admitted to the bar in 2000. In 2003, he was appointed to the municipal court of Centralia, Washington and, the following year, was elected to the bench of the Lewis County District Court.

Buzzard has criticized the lack of security in the judicial facilities of Washington which have a high rate of courtroom violence; the state has the eighth greatest number of annual courtroom security incidents in the United States, eclipsing even that of New York despite the latter state having three times Washington's population.

Buzzard was the subject of criticism in 2018 by a former court employee who accused him of drinking alcohol in his judge's chambers, and for leaving his firearm in an unlocked drawer of his desk. According to Buzzard, he kept the firearm for personal protection as one of his judicial duties was to ride circuit to the remote town of Morton, Washington. A former judicial colleague did not agree with Buzzard's concerns about courthouse security and did not think he needed a firearm to protect himself. Buzzard stated that he carried his gun mainly for the walk from the parking lot to the courthouse building. He did not carry it on the bench and was "not roaming the halls with it." Buzzard later began keeping his firearm in safe at the courthouse.

=== Restraint of criminal defendants ===
On at least three occasions, Buzzards has intervened to restrain criminal defendants attempting to flee court.

In April 2018, Buzzard personally intervened in a fight that erupted in his courtroom at the Lewis County Courthouse after a civil defendant punched an attorney. Buzzard responded to the assault by descending from the bench and physically restraining the man. Later that October, Buzzard again descended from the bench to give chase after two criminal suspects attempted to escape his courtroom. When the two men fled, Buzzard ripped off his judicial robe and pursued the suspects through the courthouse, ultimately grappling and restraining one of the two. The second man was later apprehended by deputies of the Lewis County Sheriff. He helped subdue a prisoner during an altercation at the Lewis County Law and Justice Center in May 2025, tackling a man in custody attempting to flee a courtroom who had also physically attacked a security officer.

== Personal life ==
Buzzard is a member of the Benevolent and Protective Order of Elks and is Methodist. He is married with two children.

== See also ==
- Washington State Supreme Court
