= William Perry Jackson =

American serial killer

- Born: January 1955 (age 71); Milwaukie, Oregon, U.S.
- Other name: Pete Jackson
- Convictions: Murder (x5); Rape; Kidnapping; Escaping custody
- Penalty: Washington: Life imprisonment (x2); 10 years Oregon: Life imprisonment x3

Details
- Victims: 5 (1 as accomplice)
- Span of crimes: May 21 – August 10, 1980
- Country: United States
- States: Oregon, Washington
- Date apprehended: August 22, 1980
- Imprisoned at: Oregon State Penitentiary, Salem, Oregon

William Perry Jackson (born January 1955) is an American serial killer who, together with two accomplices, killed five people during robberies in Washington and Oregon from May to August 1980. Convicted and sentenced to multiple life terms in two separate trials, in addition to another sentence for escaping from prison, he is currently serving his sentences in an Oregon prison.

== Murders ==
The first death linked to Jackson occurred on May 21, 1980, when he and 27-year-old accomplice Gary Allen Smith went to a kiosk in the Portland Transit Mall, where they beat up the janitor, 45-year-old Calvin Toran. After stealing $10 from him, they threw him in the back of their van and drove to Forest Park, where they stabbed him to death. On June 11, Jackson and Smith decided to break into a home in Vancouver, Washington occupied by 74-year-old Hazel Wilson. After prying the door open, the pair went inside and beat up the elderly woman until she was unable to get up. Jackson and Smith then ransacked the house, stole some valuables and promptly left. Wilson was found two days later by a concerned neighbor and driven to a local hospital, where she succumbed to her injuries on June 14.

Jackson and Smith then started hitchhiking between Washington and Oregon, eventually finding themselves in Portland in early August. On August 5, they broke into the house of 59-year-old Julia Annabell Armstrong and proceeded to beat her to death before ransacking her home. Two days later, they were picked up by 18-year-old Michael Anthony Butler, who agreed to aid them in their crime spree. Later in the day, while searching for gas in Chehalis, Washington, the trio went inside the home of 78-year-old Theodore May, whom they proceeded to beat to death in his garage. They then stole some cash, other valuables and gas before returning to their car.

On August 10, the trio were driving near Scholls, Oregon when they spotted 14-year-old Charmel Ulrich and 13-year-old Laurie Leach walking along a rural path. Jackson then convinced him to pull over, then he and Butler got out to talk to the girls. Suddenly, they shoved Ulrich inside the car but failed to capture Leach, who managed to escape. Smith then drove the car an isolated area near Rose Lodge, all the while Jackson and Butler raped Ulrich in the back seat. When they got there, they then forced her to make a phone call to Leach's mother through a telephone booth, and after she finished, Smith stabbed her to death. The body was then dumped in a remote wooded area east of Waldport.

== Arrest and first trial ==
While investigating Ulrich's kidnapping, local authorities learned that a man by the name of Michael Anthony Butler had made remarks about the incident that indicated he had intimate knowledge of the crime. He was then arrested in Forest Grove and brought to the nearest police station, where he readily admitted guilt to the abduction and murder, even offering to show detectives where he believed the body might be buried. After initially leading them to some campgrounds in Hood River County, Butler eventually found the correct burial site. Using information provided by him, both Jackson and Smith were arrested on August 22. Each man was then charged with kidnapping, rape and murder, and held on $500,000 bail.

At trial, Smith pleaded not guilty to the charges relating to Ulrich's murder, with his trial being set for October 15 at the request of his court-appointed attorney. At his request, the trial was expedited even further and started on October 11, done in conjunction with Jackson's attorney, who was granted a similar request. In January 1981, he was convicted and automatically sentenced to life imprisonment, as the death penalty had been temporarily suspended at the state level at the time.

Approximately a month later, Jackson waived his right to a jury trial in the Toran case and agreed to plead guilty. After receiving a life term in that case, Jackson and his attorneys offered to plead guilty in the Ulrich case as well, but this motion was denied by Judge Richard Burke. In response, Jackson's attorney petitioned the Supreme Court to have Burke removed on the grounds of prejudice against his client. When this was denied, Burke agreed to lift a gag order regarding the confessions, much to the dismay of Jackson's attorney, who wanted some of the evidence suppressed.

In the end, Jackson was convicted for this and two of the other murders, for which he was given consecutive life terms in prison. Shortly after pleading guilty and receiving another life for the murder of Wilson, he volunteered to participate in medical research programs as a test subject for drug experimentations.

=== Prison escape ===
In early August 1982, Jackson was extradited to Washington, where he was to face a sentencing trial for the murder of May. On August 5, he and a convicted robber named Gus Allen Turner broke through the plaster ceiling of their cell at the Lewis County Courthouse jail and climbed through, re-entering the courthouse. They proceeded to lower themselves to the ground using a rope made of blankets. From there, they split and went their separate ways, with Jackson fleeing to his native city of Milwaukie, Oregon, where he was arrested later that afternoon. He was then charged on first-degree escape charges, offering to plead guilty if the county sheriff spent a few weeks in isolation with him.

== Further trials and status ==
The following month, Jackson agreed to serve as a witness against Smith at the latter's trial for the murder of Hazel Wilson. During the proceedings, the two men gave conflicting accounts of what had happened, with Jackson claiming that Smith had sexually abused, beaten and stomped on the elderly woman while he just idly stood by. Near the end of his testimony, he even said that Smith supposedly joked about hitting her with a frying pan, calling it "the old kaBANK! [sic] trick". Smith would eventually be convicted of the murder and sentenced to life imprisonment without parole, but continued to proclaim his innocence, in addition to verbally degrading his former accomplice.

After this, Jackson appealed some of his sentences to the Oregon Supreme Court, arguing that some statements should not have been admitted as evidence. This tactic did not work for the murders of Armstrong and May, for whose murders his convictions were upheld. He was then granted a resentencing trial for the murder of Ulrich, but was again found guilty and resentenced to life imprisonment. As of October 2026, Jackson remains incarcerated at the Oregon State Penitentiary and continues to serve his sentences.

== See also ==
- List of serial killers in the United States
- List of prison escapes
