= Claquato Church =

Historic church in Washington, United States

- U.S. National Register of Historic Places
- Washington State Heritage Register
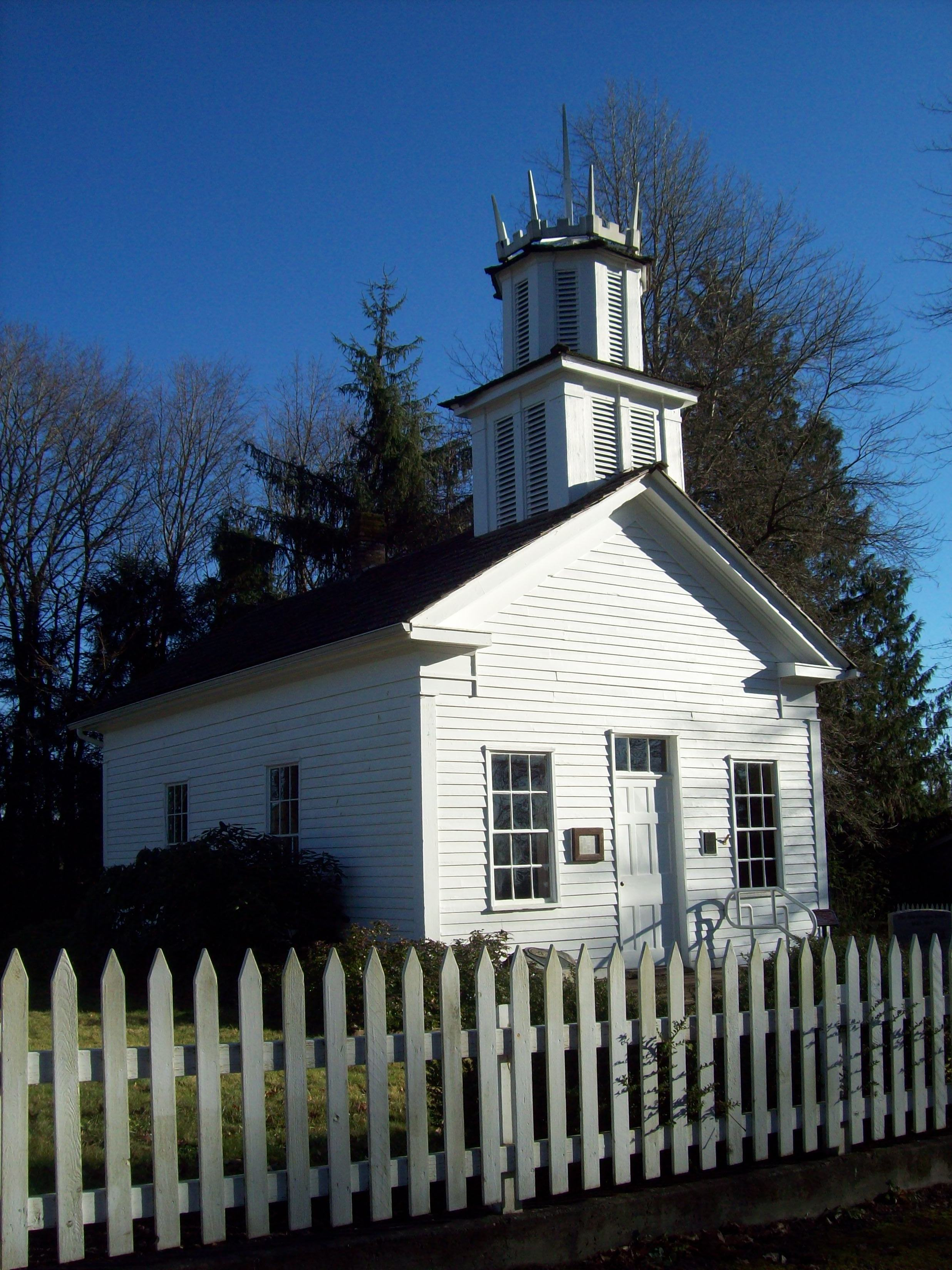
- Claquato Church, 2012

- Location within Washington (state)
- Location: 125 Water Street, Chehalis, Washington
- Coordinates: 46°38′33″N 123°1′18″W
- Area: 0.37 acres (0.15 ha)
- Built: 1858
- Architect: John Duff Clinger
- Restored: 1953
- Restored by: American Legion
- Website: Chehalis United Methodist Church
- NRHP reference No.: 73001882

Significant dates
- Added to NRHP: April 24, 1973
- Designated WSHR: January 16, 1973

Claquato Church is a historic Methodist church located in the former community of Claquato, Washington. The structure is recognized as the oldest standing church building in the state of Washington and was listed on the National Register of Historic Places in 1973.

Originally meant as a Presbyterian house of worship when construction began in 1857, the church was dedicated in 1858 under Methodist ministry. The church was built by local residents, and without debt, on land donated by the Davis family, founders of the town of Claquato, the original county seat of Lewis County, Washington. The building was also used as a schoolhouse in its first years, known as the Claquato Academy.

The church began to wane after 1874 when the county government shifted to nearby Chehalis. Religious functions ceased and the building fell into disrepair. Two major renovations, in 1929 and 1953, helped restore the church however the structure remained closed except for special occasions. The county officially took over ownership of the site in 1948. In July 2025, the Lewis County board of commissioners placed the church up for sale. Deeming the building and property to be of "no value", the county cited high costs of maintenance, as well as additional financial concerns stemming from a backlog of repairs, in its determination to sell the landmark.

The small, 600-square-foot (56 m^{2}) rectangular church is noted for its two-tiered steeple topped with a wooden crown of thorns. A bronze bell, manufactured for the church in 1857, remains in the bell tower. The sanctuary takes up most of the interior space which contains original wooden pews. Situated on the grounds are several markers and plaques denoting key historical events either to the church or the community. The Claquato Cemetery, a separate entity, is located north of the church.

== History ==
=== Beginning of Claquato Church ===
The founder of Claquato, Lewis Davis, first began Presbyterian services (Note: In describing the early religious denomination of the Claquato Church, sources fluctuate between Presbyterian or Protestant. See sources throughout the article for the differences.) in his log cabin home after he built the dwelling in 1853. Davis, along with his wife, Susan, donated land (Note: The two-lot parcel was officially donated by land deed on May 7, 1859.) for a new church and construction commenced in 1857, meant originally to be of use as a Presbyterian house of worship. As Davis understood the Methodist congregation to be a much larger contingent of the area's population, the chapel was allowed to be consecrated the following year under the Methodist church with a promise that the chapel was to be open to all denominations. At the dedication in 1858, under Methodist reverend John F, DeVore, the church was without debt due in part to community donations. The first pastor was Rev. John Harper. (Note: Sourcing refers to first pastor Rev. John Harper under the last name of Harwood.)

Required by the original deed, the building was to be of use as a schoolhouse for up to seven years. Opened as the "Claquato Academy", (Note: The hand-painted sign for Claquato Academy was created by the church's first pastor, Rev. Harper.) it was the second school district in the Washington Territory and lasted until a new school was built in 1864. Female teachers at the time were known as the "Mercer Girls". When the county seat moved from Claquato to Chehalis in 1874, the church began to lose its congregants though services continued into the 1930s. For a brief time between 1880 and 1882, the church was used again for Presbyterian services. In 1882, the property was deeded to the Claquato community. The same year, the original Presbyterian congregation shifted to a site in Chehalis that was used for a pole yard by the county public utility district; the congregation constructed and opened the Westminster Presbyterian Church on Market Boulevard by 1908.

=== 20th century and restoration periods ===
By 1925, the church was noted to be in a state of decay. Not until May 1928 were plans organized to begin efforts to restore the historic church, initiated by the St. Helen's Club of Chehalis who had previously in the decade restored the Jackson Courthouse. Though the structure was found to be sound, the white-painted clapboard and green shutters were faded and the top of the bell tower, described as a "spiraled cupola", was considered "a bit weather beaten. Efforts stalled and the project restarted by church trustees in January 1929. The Salvation Army began services later that year.

Vandals attempted to push the "crown of thorns" steeple off the roof in 1930. The church was rededicated in 1933 and occasional religious services and Sunday school classes were held into the late 1930s. In September 1934, the church, in recognition of having held the first Methodist service in Washington Territory, was a stopping point during a 100th anniversary celebration of Methodist missionary, Jason Lee. The event included a motorized "Covered Wagon" caravan led by Jay Samuel Stowell. A windstorm in November 1934 damaged the roof and fence gate; the Muckleshoot Tribe helped to raise funds to repair the church. Due to the economic conditions of the Great Depression and increased vandalism of the church, the county began unofficial oversight of the property, boarding up windows and padlocking the door.

Lewis County undertook ownership of the Claquato Church site in December 1948 under a quit claim deed. The building and grounds have been owned by the Lewis County Parks commission since 1952 for use as a public facility, however faith services were no longer held.

The site remained vacant until efforts were made in the early 1950s to restore the church. A local chapter of the American Legion was reported to have taken interest in restoring the church in 1950 and an effort to renovate the church as a memorial was started in March 1952; a group known as the Chehalis United Youth Movement partnered with the American Legion, which was to supply materials. Plans were announced that October, with oversight of the project being placed under a community group and the legion post, with hopes to complete the restoration in time for Claquato's centennial in 1953. The restoration was completed in August 1953; the church was rededicated on August 16, 1953 as a memorial to honor early pioneers of Lewis County. A crowd of 700 people were reported to have attended the ceremony. The event was covered by several wire services and a reporter for the New York Times was dispatched to the event. Four members of the American Legion were awarded by the Washington State Centennial committee the following year in recognition for their efforts.

An official committee to continue to preserve and maintain the church as an historic landmark was formed in November 1956. A $1,000 fund through the county was set aside for such purposes, initially used in 1958 for standard upkeep and painting and were the first repairs since 1953. A 100th anniversary of the church was held on August 10, 1958 and a bronze memorial plaque was dedicated, provided by the Daughters of Pioneers of Washington. A booklet on the history of the church was given to attendees and the opening ceremonies were started with the ringing of the original church bell. Despite the restoration efforts and attempts for caretaker maintenance, upkeep of the church remained a struggle, often failing to open for community occasions. A two-person volunteer "committee" began oversight of the Claquato Church by the 1960s, allowing the historic landmark to be open to the public for religious services. The church was dedicated again on August 16, 1963.

Management of the site was proposed to be handed over to the Lewis County Historical Society in 1969 though opposition was strongly noted, finding the county had more than enough funds to cover the basic maintenance costs of the church and grounds. The building was added to the National Register of Historic Places in 1973.

=== 21st century ===
The church held a 150th anniversary in 2008.

The church was in need of repairs by the 2020s; rot and water leaks were apparent. The Claquato Cemetery Board proposed, with financial backing in place, to restore the landmark. Part of the plan included the replacement of the roof using original-style cedar shake, estimated to cost $400,000. To protect the site, the county passed a covenant clause in June 2025, disallowing the property to be developed in a way which would cause "destruction, loss or damage" of the landmark. The Lewis County commissioner board announced the following July that the church and surrounding land lot were to be put up for sale via auction. Declaring the historic location as surplus, the board cited excess maintenance and repair costs. Lack of public funds were also noted, associated with financial and maintenance demands of other county properties such as the Lewis County Historical Museum and the Southwest Fairgrounds. The county deemed that "no value" was derived from the church and property.

The county required a formal proposal for the preservation of the church building to be considered along with a sealed monetary bid for the sale, accepted until the end of July 2025. The sale of the church was officially announced by the county on October 21, 2025. The Claquato (Church) Cemetery Board, the only bidder for the historic site, purchased the entire property for $5,000. The board announced plans to immediately restore the church at an initial investment of almost $2.8 million. The project is to save the church in its original form but convert the usage of the building into a community space and visitor center, similar to that of the Graham Visitors Center at Washington Park Arboretum in Seattle.

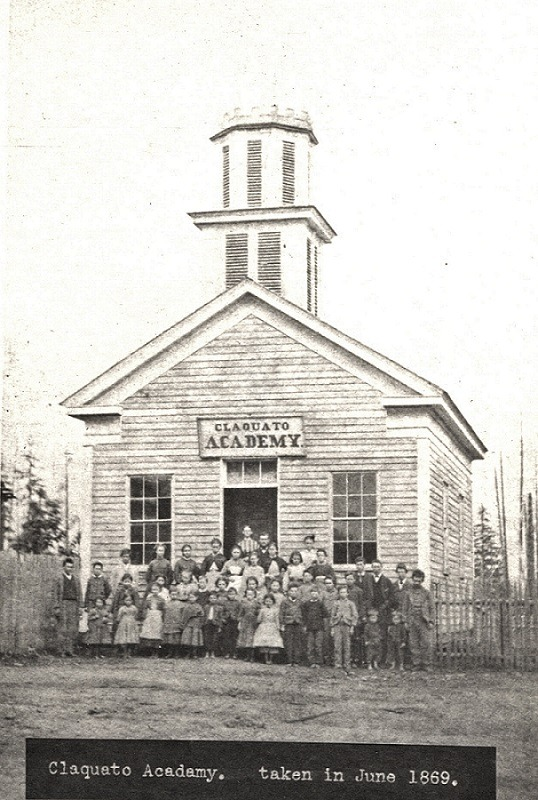
Claquato Academy, 1869

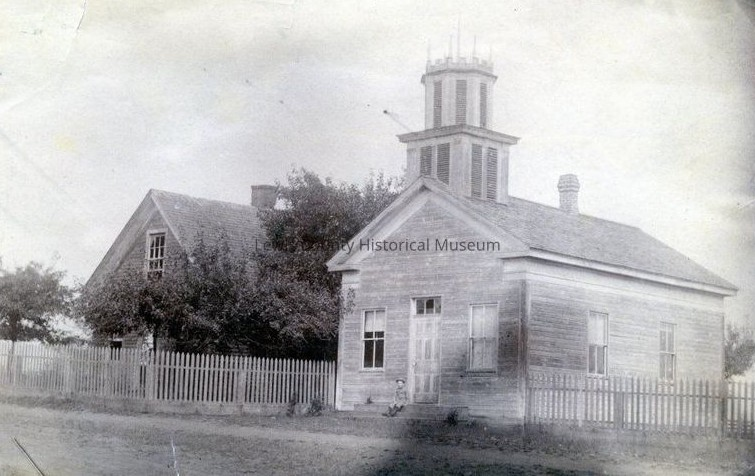
Claquato Church, unpainted, c. 1880s

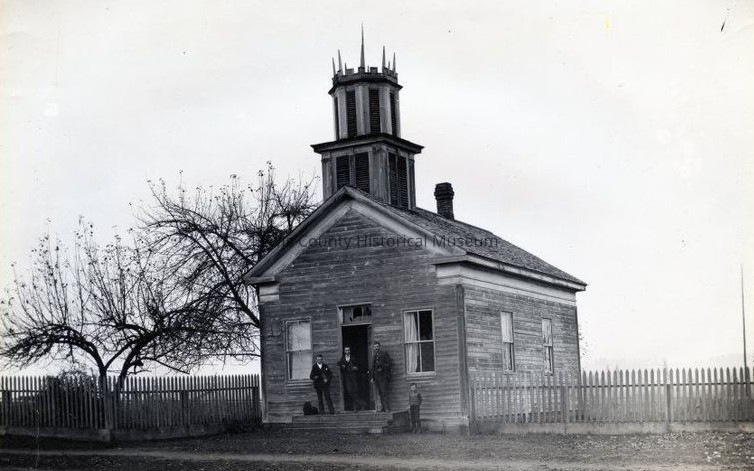
Claquato Church, 1891

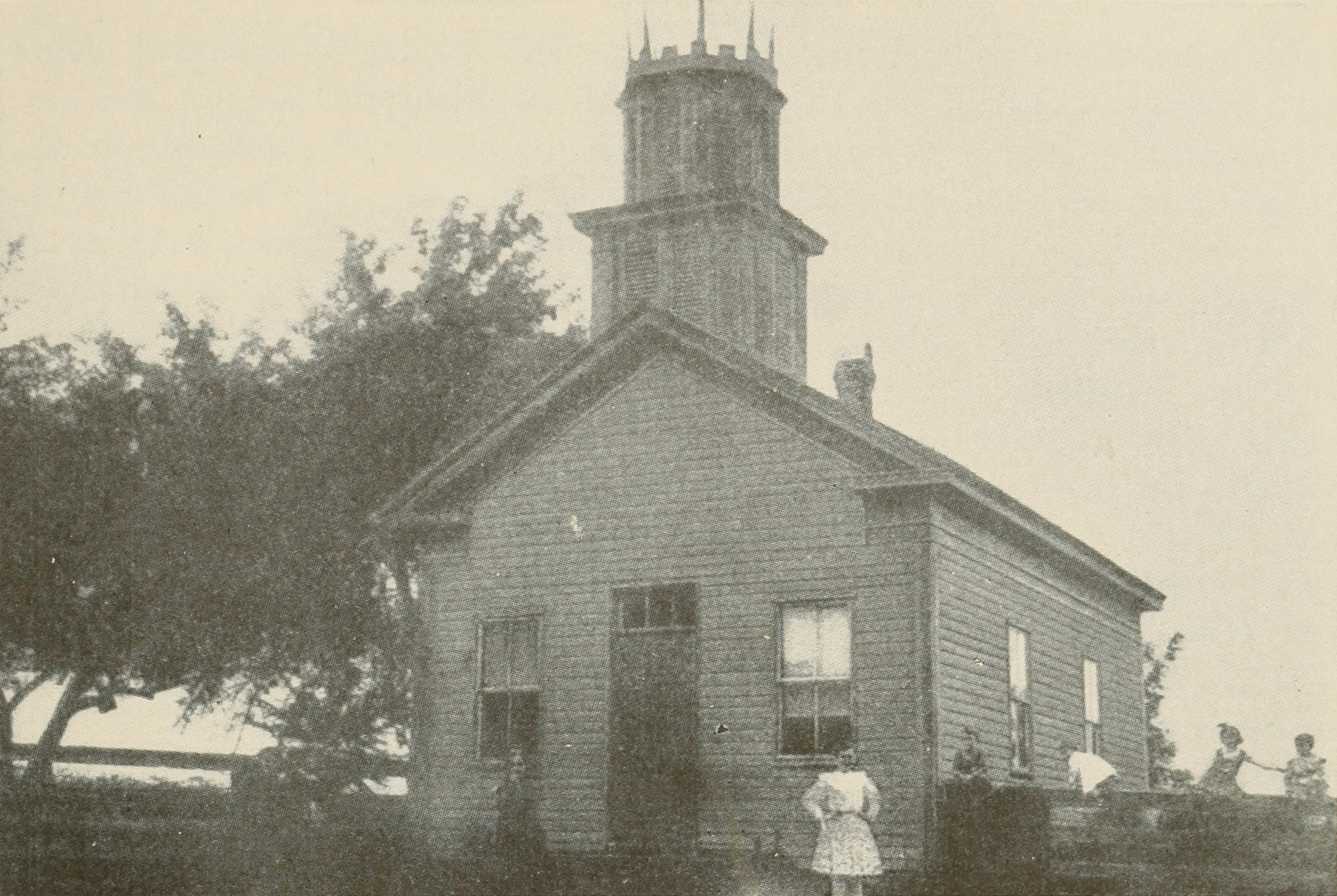
Exterior c. 1900

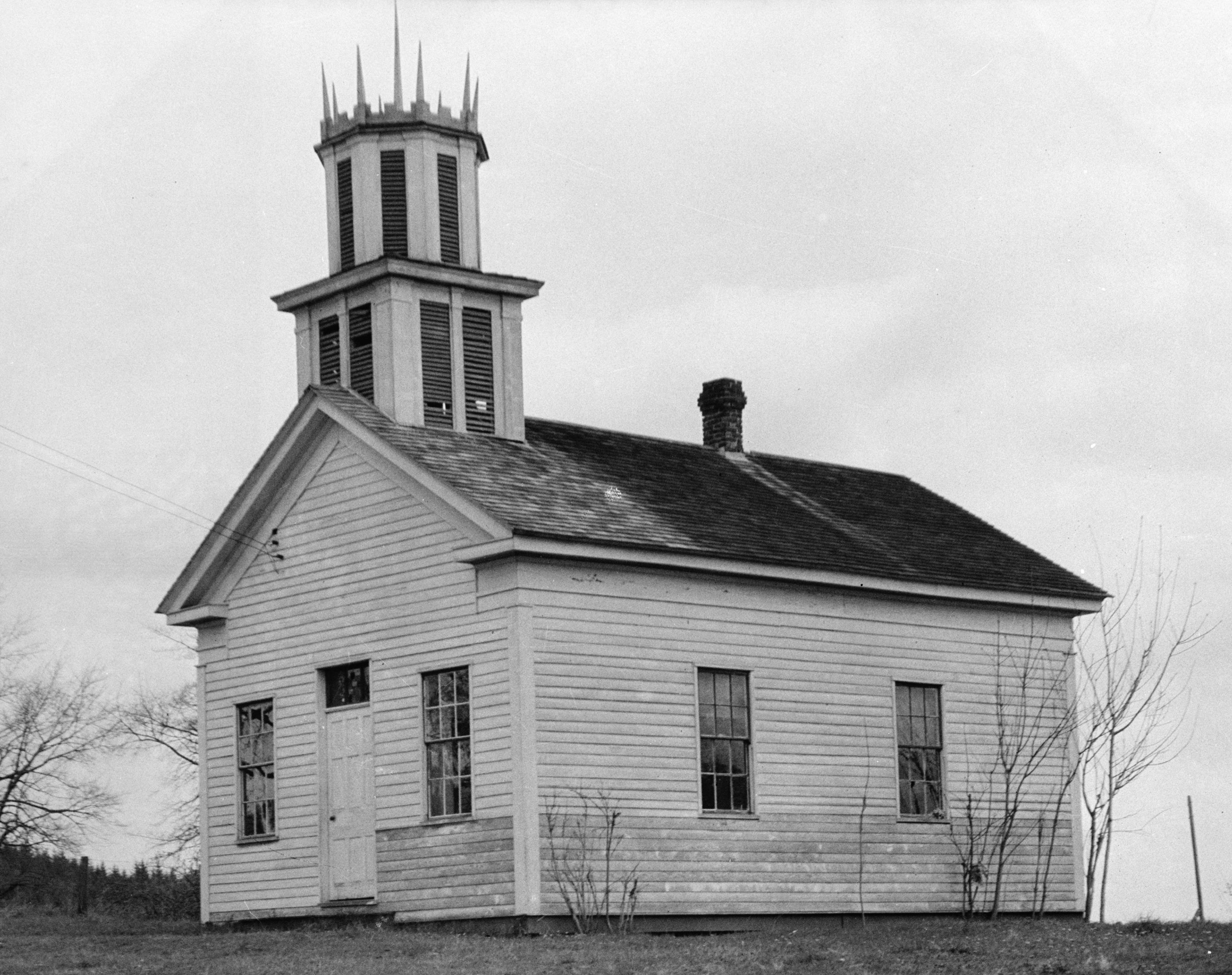
Claquato Church, c. 1948

== Geography ==
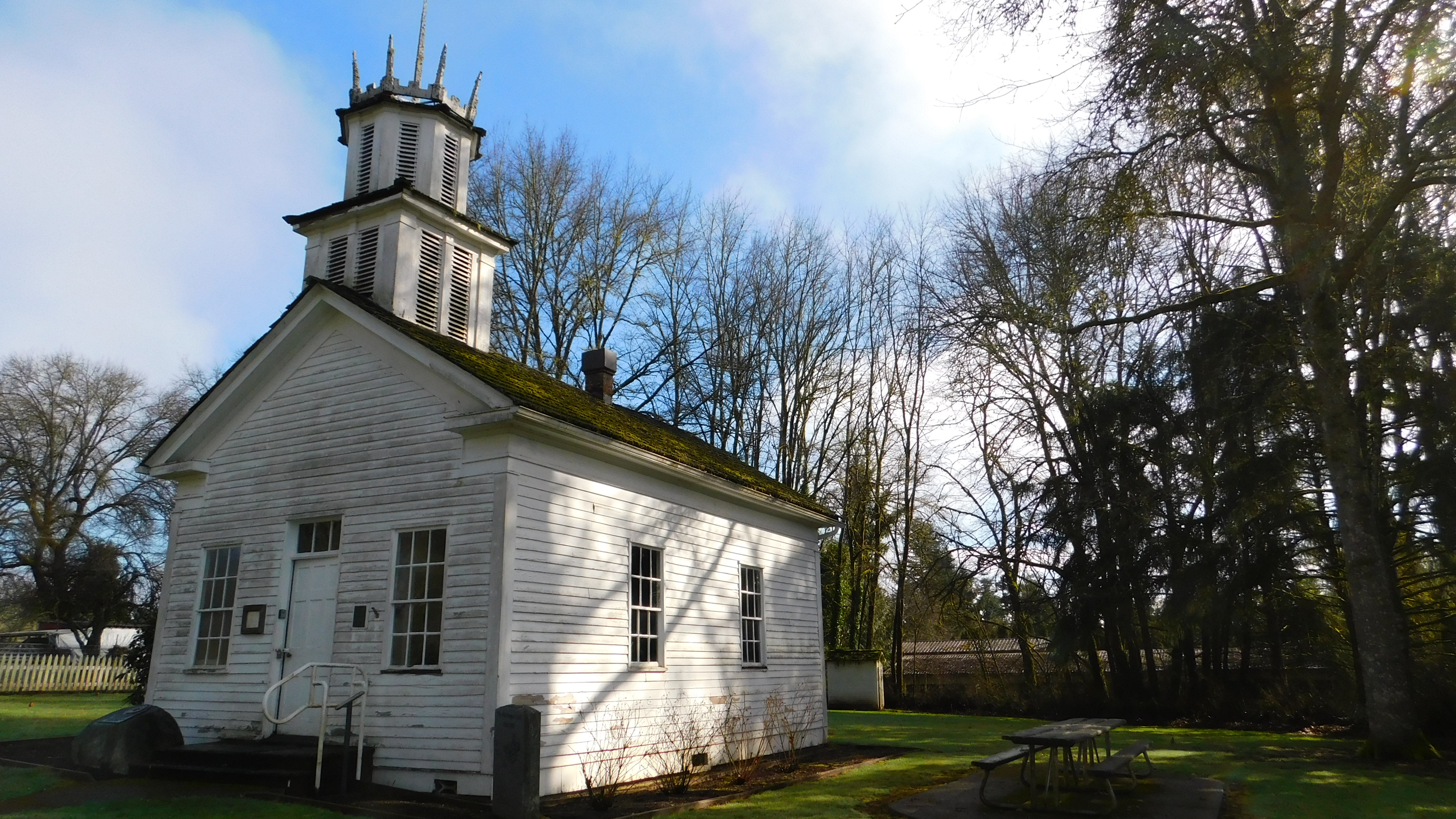
Claquato Church and grounds, 2025

Situated on a 0.37-acre (0.15 ha) parcel, Claquato Church is located off State Route 6 in the community of Claquato, once the county seat of Lewis County on Military Road, the early main thoroughfare between the Columbia River and Steilacoom. The road was a part of the Cowlitz Trail. The church is approximately 3 miles (4.8 km) west of Chehalis and is situated on what once known as Claquato Hill.

The name, Claquato (klah-quay-tow), is a local word of the indigenous Upper Chehalis that has been translated to mean "high", "high ground", "high prairie", or "the high place".

== Architecture and features ==
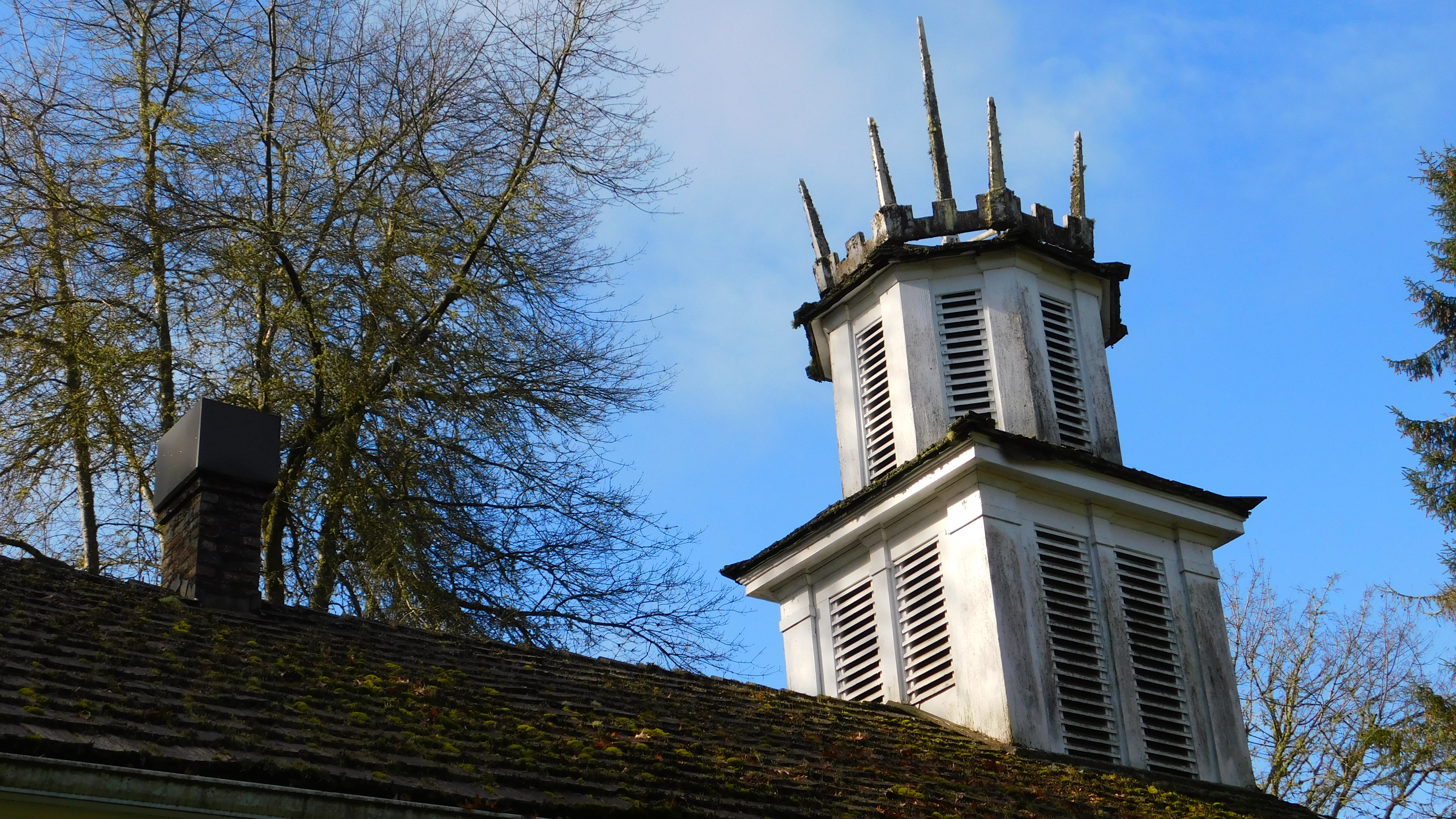
"Crown of Thorns", 2025

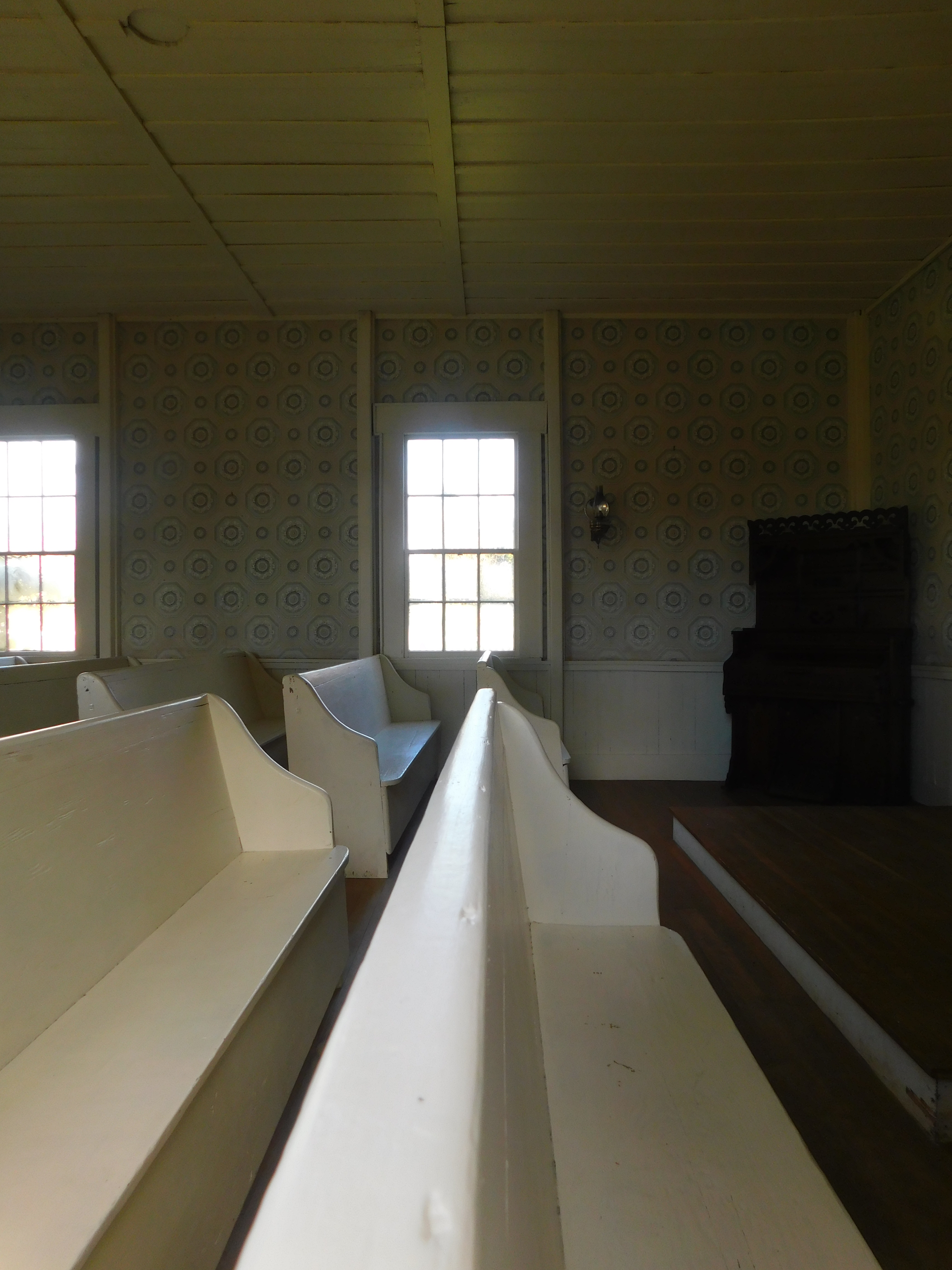
Interior and original pews, 2025

Unless otherwise noted, the details provided are based on the 1973 National Register of Historic Places (NRHP) nomination form and may not reflect updates or changes to the Claquato Church in the interim.

The 600-square-foot (56 m^{2}) church was built by a group of volunteers under the oversight of John Duff Clinger, brother-in-law to Lewis Davis. The design mirrored that of the First Methodist Church in Portland, Oregon. The first lumber milled by the new sawmill in the town was used in the construction. Nails used to construct the church were forged by the town's blacksmith.

A lack of nearby residential or commercial development, as well as a lack of major fires, has allowed the church to remain in its original location and architectural style.

=== Exterior ===
The 20 ft × 30 ft (6.1 m × 9.1 m) structure features an belfry and crown steeple modeled after mid-nineteenth century New England meeting houses, topped by a wooden crown of thorns. The bell tower features two sections with numerous louvers; the bottom of the tower is square while the top portion is octagonal. The belfry is constructed in mortise and tenon fashion, including at the gable eaves. The bell, purchased and installed for $100, was manufactured in 1857 by the Henry Hooper and Company from Boston and is such inscribed; during delivery, the bell was shipped around Cape Horn. (Note: The NRHP form mentions the bell to be manufactured under the name of Henry A. Harper despite evidence to the contrary. See sources in the section for the discrepancy.)

The siding was built of whip-sawn boards and the entrance doors featured hand-mortising and pegs. Clinger, who built the doors, also built the door and window casements.

=== Interior ===
The sanctuary, which seats 70 people, is listed at 20 ft × 23 ft (6.1 m × 7.0 m) in dimension. Wood planks initially used to build the church are visible in the vestibule and the belfry The church has gone without a modern heat source, considered a benefit to the structure's stability as long-term issues of condensation were avoided.

The interior contains twelve, white-painted pews originally donated by residents of Boistfort, who also hand-built the pulpit using wood from the original church organ. A second instrument, a pump organ manufactured in the late 19th century, was noted to remain by 1994.

=== Restorations ===
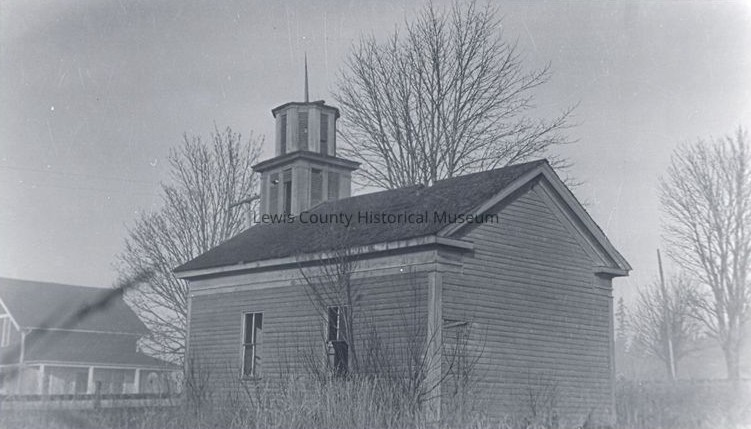
Before 1929 restoration, missing "crown of thorns"

A small renovation project, for repairs and the need for a new floor, was completed in 1929. The bell tower was repaired after the 1930 vandalization attempt. New shutters were constructed beginning in September 1942.

The 1953 renovation, overseen by American Legion Chehalis Post Number 22, made no structural changes to the building but did include restoring the original woodwork, repairing the belfry, hanging new mid-19th century style wallpaper, and refinishing the exterior. The louvers, roof, and front steps were replaced and the foundation repaired. In 2006, the crown of thorns on the steeple was restored.

After the sale of the church in 2025, the roof was replaced. A restoration effort to the exterior began in September 2026. Lead paint was stripped from the cladding and rotted woodwork, such as trim and sideboards, was removed. An architecture firm from Seattle led the efforts.

=== Grounds ===
With the purpose to add to the "rustic setting" of the site, hardwood trees were planted in 1961. An interpretive map sign, showing the layout of Claquato during its peak in the 18th century, was placed in front of the church in 1966. The map was handmade by Chehalis park superintendent, Stan Hedwall.

After the church's placement on the NRHP, the Lewis County Historical Society (LCHS) proposed in December 1973 that a plaque denoting the historical designation be placed at the church. The marker was affixed to a rock and installed outside the front entrance by 1976.

Claquato Church was one of the last sites in Lewis County, along with the city of Chehalis, to honor Ezra Meeker and his Oregon Trail journeys. Efforts to install a monument began in 2005. The marker was installed in April 2006 under the direction of the LCHS.

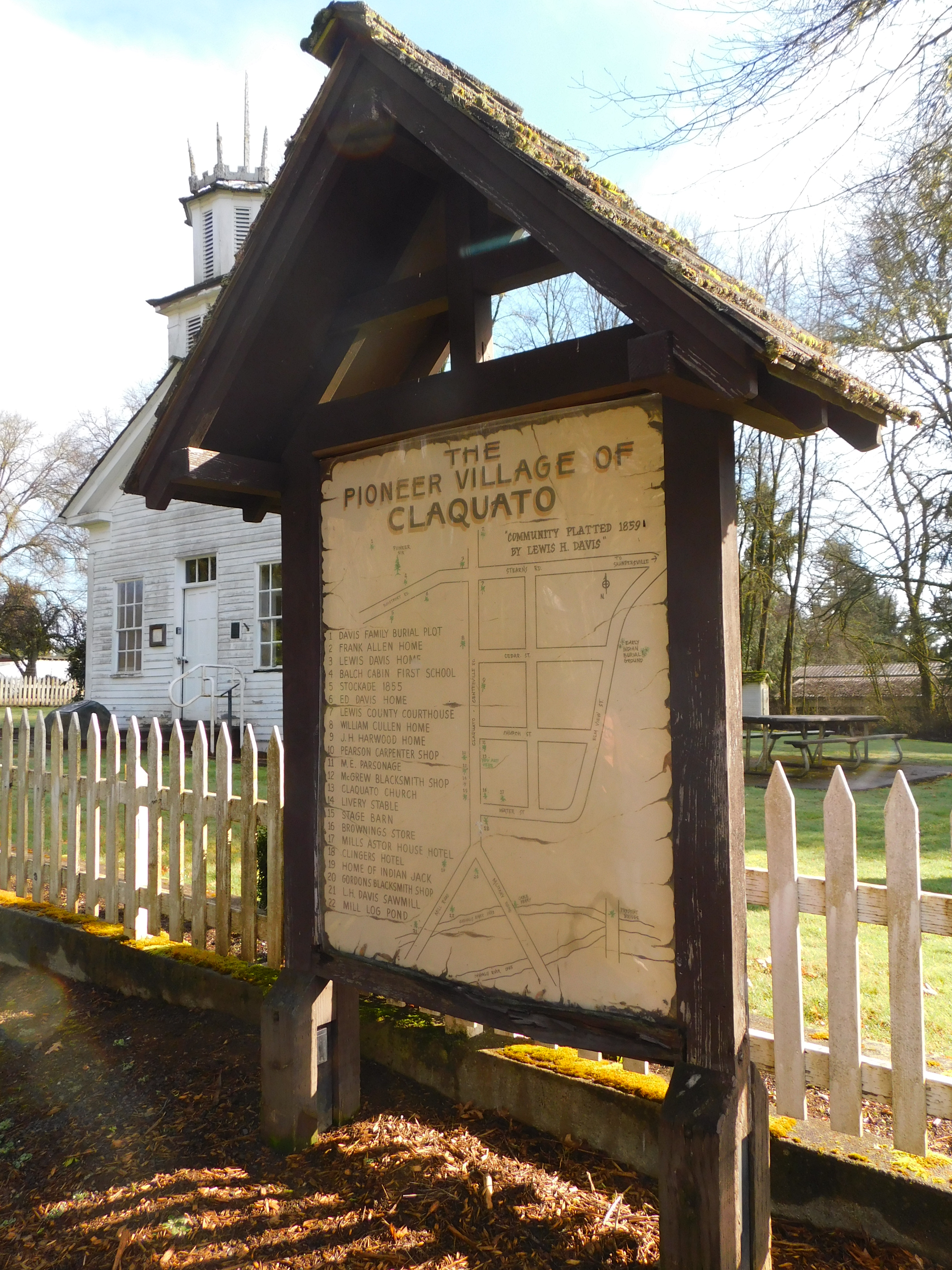
Pioneer Village of Claquato interpretative map, 2025

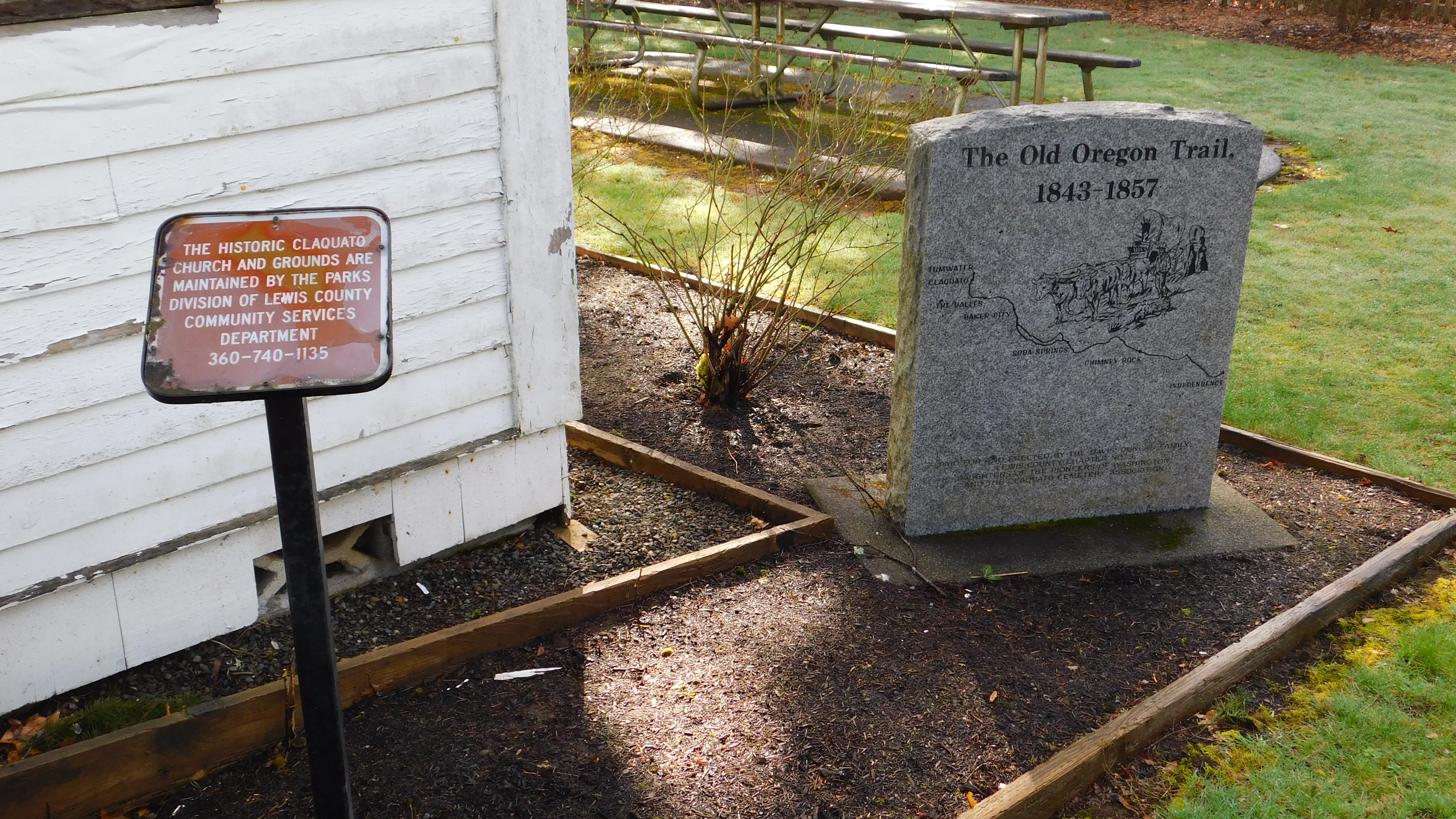
Oregon Trail and Ezra Meeker marker, 2025

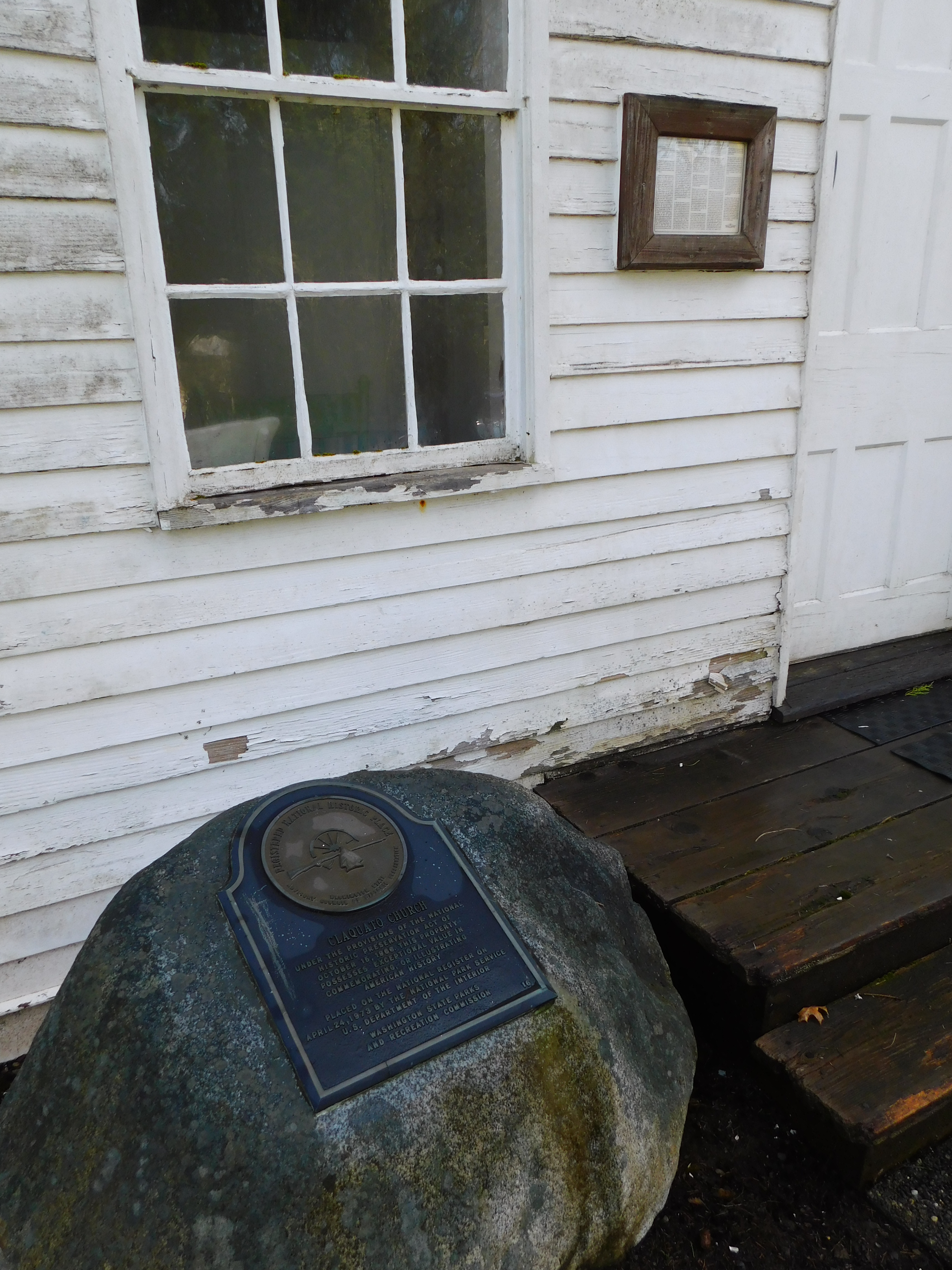
NRHP plaque, 2025

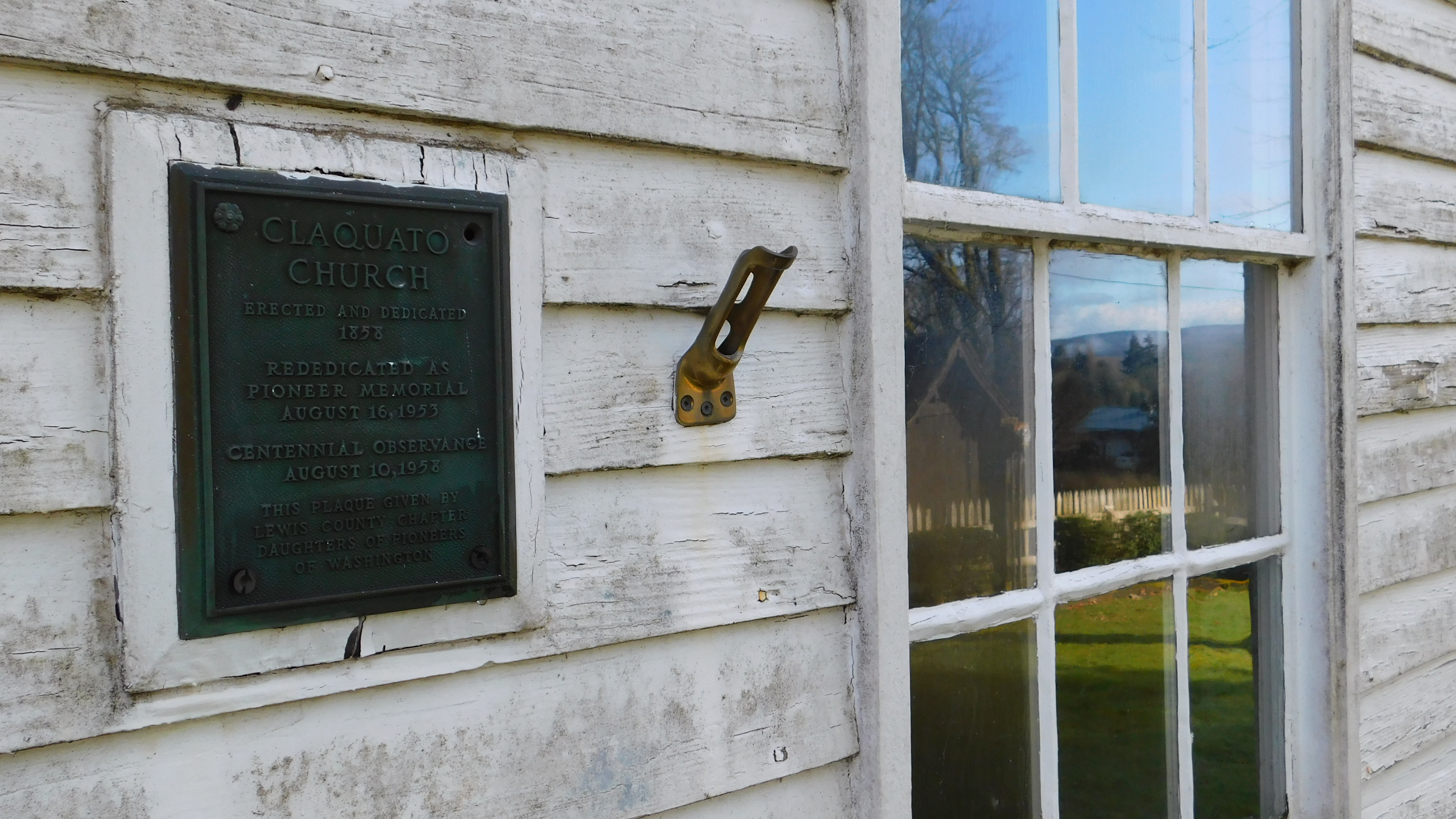
Plaque, 1958 centennial

=== Extinct features ===
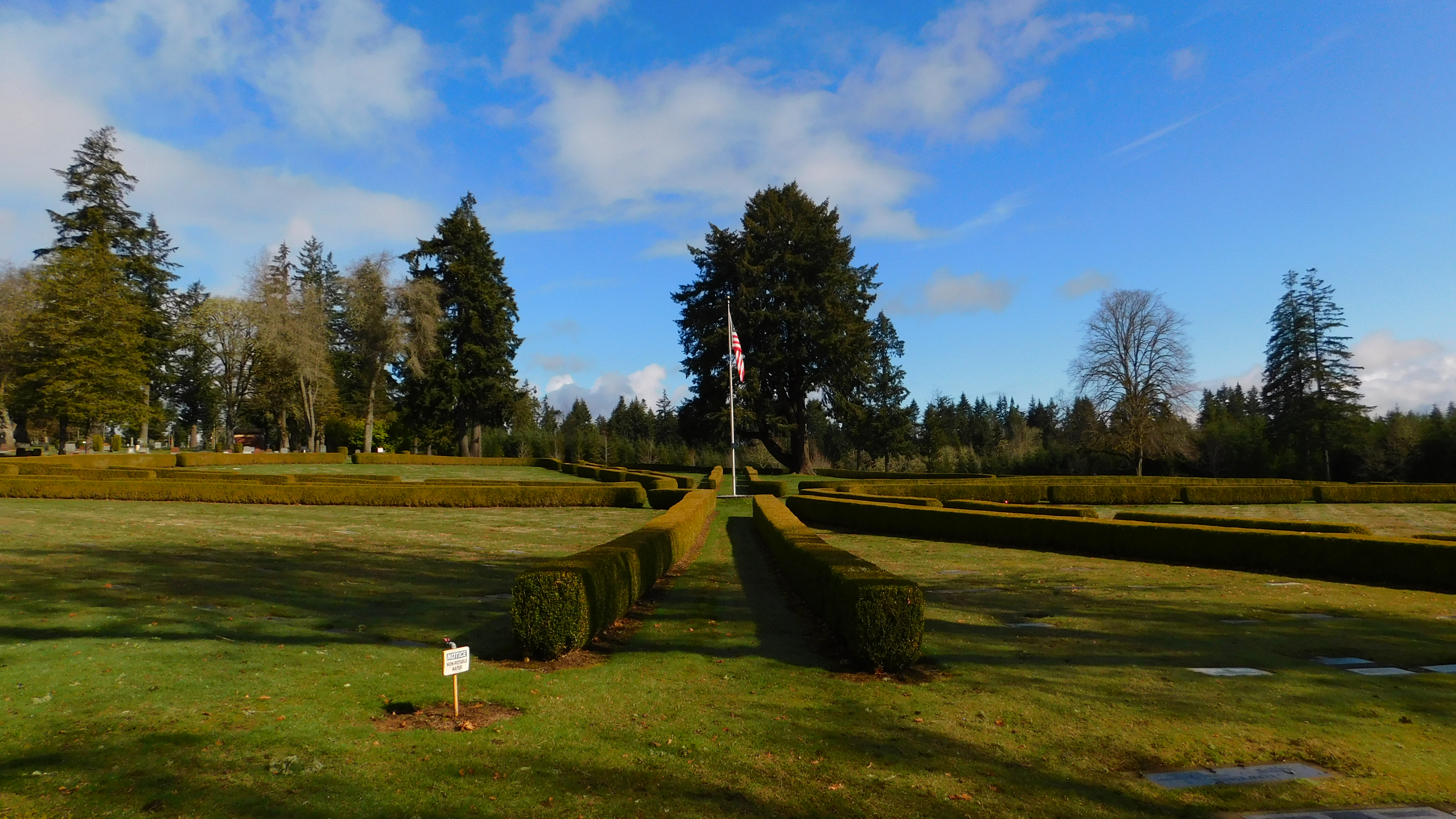
Claquato Cemetery, 2025

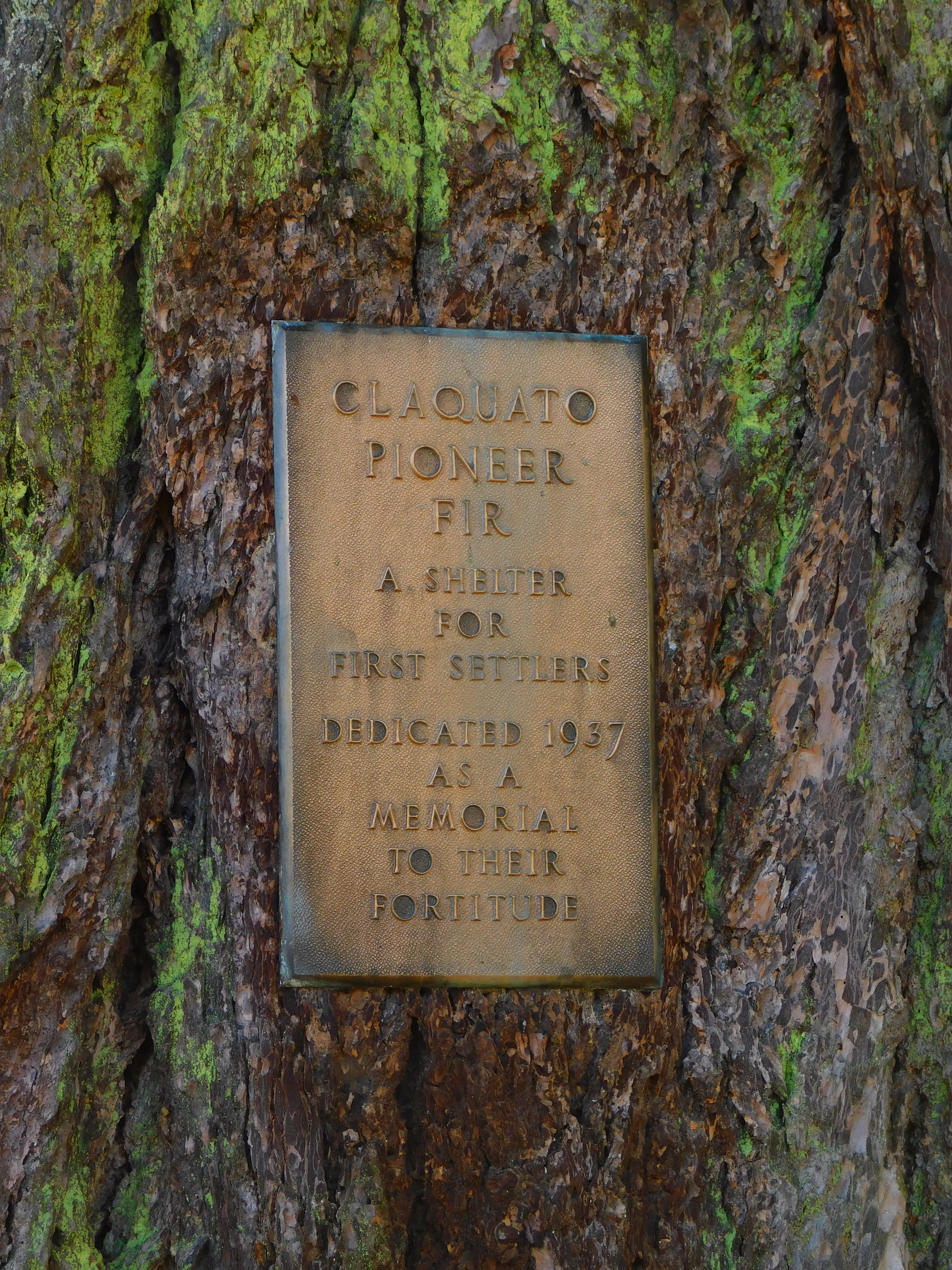
Pioneer Fir plaque, 2025

A pastor's chair, constructed and installed along with the pews, is no longer in existence. The item was noted to not have been returned to the church after the 1953 restoration.

=== Claquato Cemetery ===
The Claquato Cemetery, located one block north of the church, is home to the "Pioneer Fir", a Douglas fir that was used as a waypoint in the early days of pioneer travel. A bronze memorial plaque, fastened to a fir tree at the cemetery, honors the first non-Native settlers in Claquato and was dedicated in 1937. A bible gifted to Claquato Church in 1860 is displayed at the cemetery's office.

The cemetery, separately owned from the church under the Claquato Cemetery Board, was built out of portions of the original Davis land claim, with the Davis family beginning the burial site in 1856. Mary Spinner was the first to be buried. Lewis H. Davis, the founder of Claquato, was buried at the cemetery in 1864. The caretaker’s home at the cemetery was Lewis Davis’ third home that he constructed.

The cemetery was expanded in the 1920s with a section for members of the local International Order of Oddfellows chapter in 1893; a "Baby Rose Garden", meant for infant burials, was begun in the 1920s under the direction of the Claquato Cemetery Association. By 1936, the cemetery covered 86 acres (35 ha) after another addition to the grounds.

Claquato Pioneer Fir

Claquato Pioneer Fir
A Shelter For First Settlers
Dedicated 1937 As A Memorial To Their Fortitude

== Significance ==
Claquato Church is the oldest standing church building in the state of Washington (Note: The church was recognized as the oldest standing church as early as 1934.) and the second oldest structure, after the Jackson Courthouse, in Lewis County. Considered the last of the Washington Territory churches to remain, (Note: The 1973 NRHP form lists the St. Paul's Episcopal Church in Port Townsend, Washington, built in 1865, as an exception to the consideration of Claquato Church being the one of the last religious service structures still standing.) the building was the second Protestant house of worship constructed in the incorporated region. (Note: The NRHP form states that Claquato Church was the third such Protestant church built in the "entire vast area north of the Columbia River". Whether this is an error pertaining strictly to the Washington Territory, or was meant to include parts of Canada, is not known per the form.)

The site was added to the Washington State Register of Historic Places, via the state's Advisory Council of Historic Preservation, in January 1973. In recognition of the historical importance of Claquato Church, the building and grounds were listed on the National Register of Historic Places on April 24, 1973.

== See also ==
- List of the oldest churches in the United States
- List of the oldest buildings in Washington (state)
- National Register of Historic Places listings in Lewis County, Washington
