= Central Alabama Institute =

Defunct black school in Alabama, US

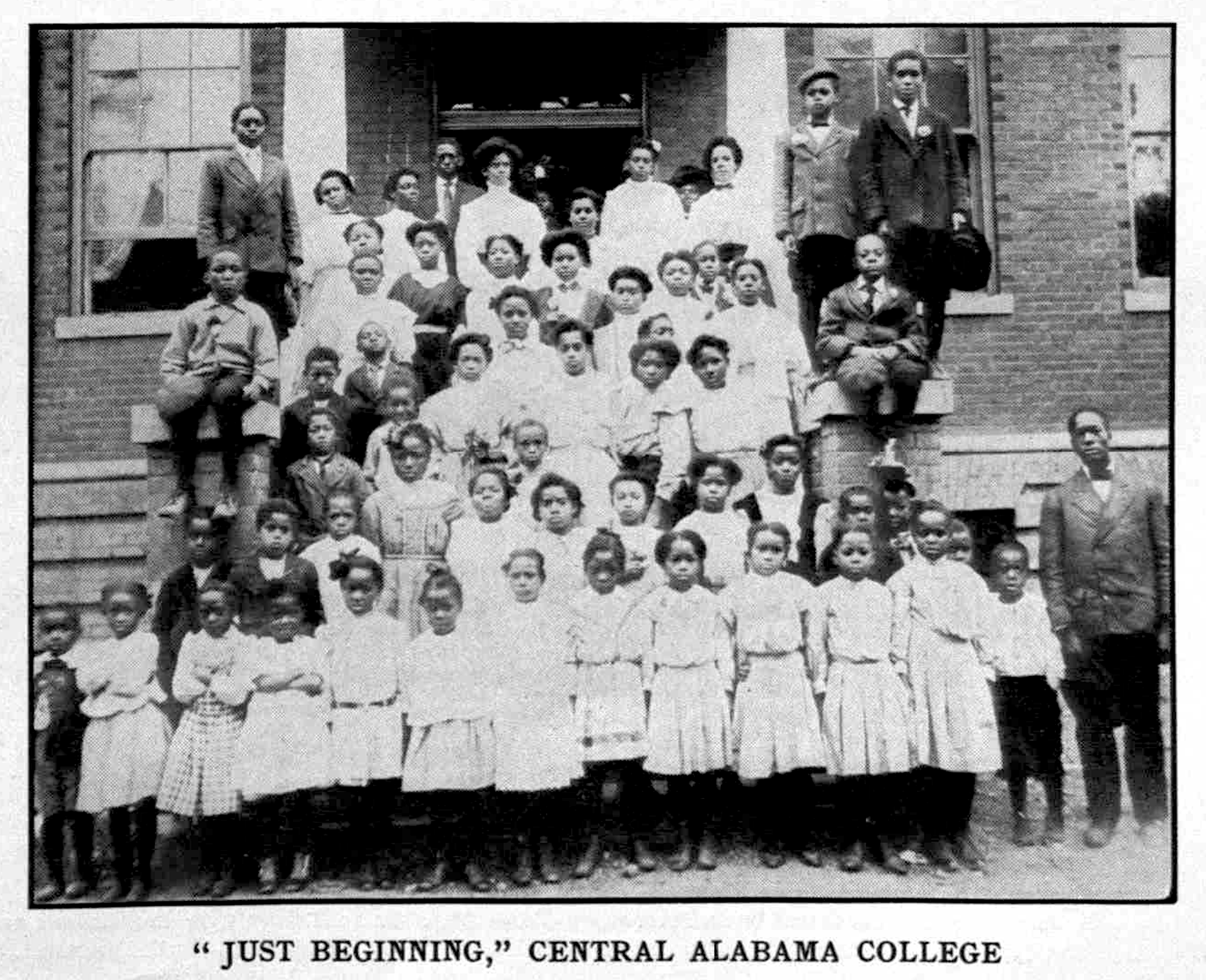
- Students c. 1910
- Huntsville, Alabama, U.S. (1865–1904); Mason City, Alabama, U.S. (1905–1922)

Information
- Other name: Rust Institute; Rust Normal Institute; Rust Biblical and Normal Institute; Central Alabama Academy; Central Alabama Institute and College; Central Alabama College
- Religious affiliation: Methodist Episcopal
- Established: 1865
- Founder: Pittsburg Aid Society, Rev. Madison C. B. Mason
- Closed: 1922
- Affiliation: Freedmen's Aid Society

Central Alabama Institute (1865 – 1922) was a private school for African American in Alabama, United States. The school was the city of Huntsville's first school for the African American community during the Reconstruction era. It was founded in 1865 in Huntsville, Alabama, and moved in 1904 to Mason City, near Birmingham, Alabama. The school also went by the names Rust Institute, Rust Normal Institute, Rust Biblical and Normal Institute, Central Alabama Academy, Central Alabama Institute and College, and Central Alabama College.

== History ==
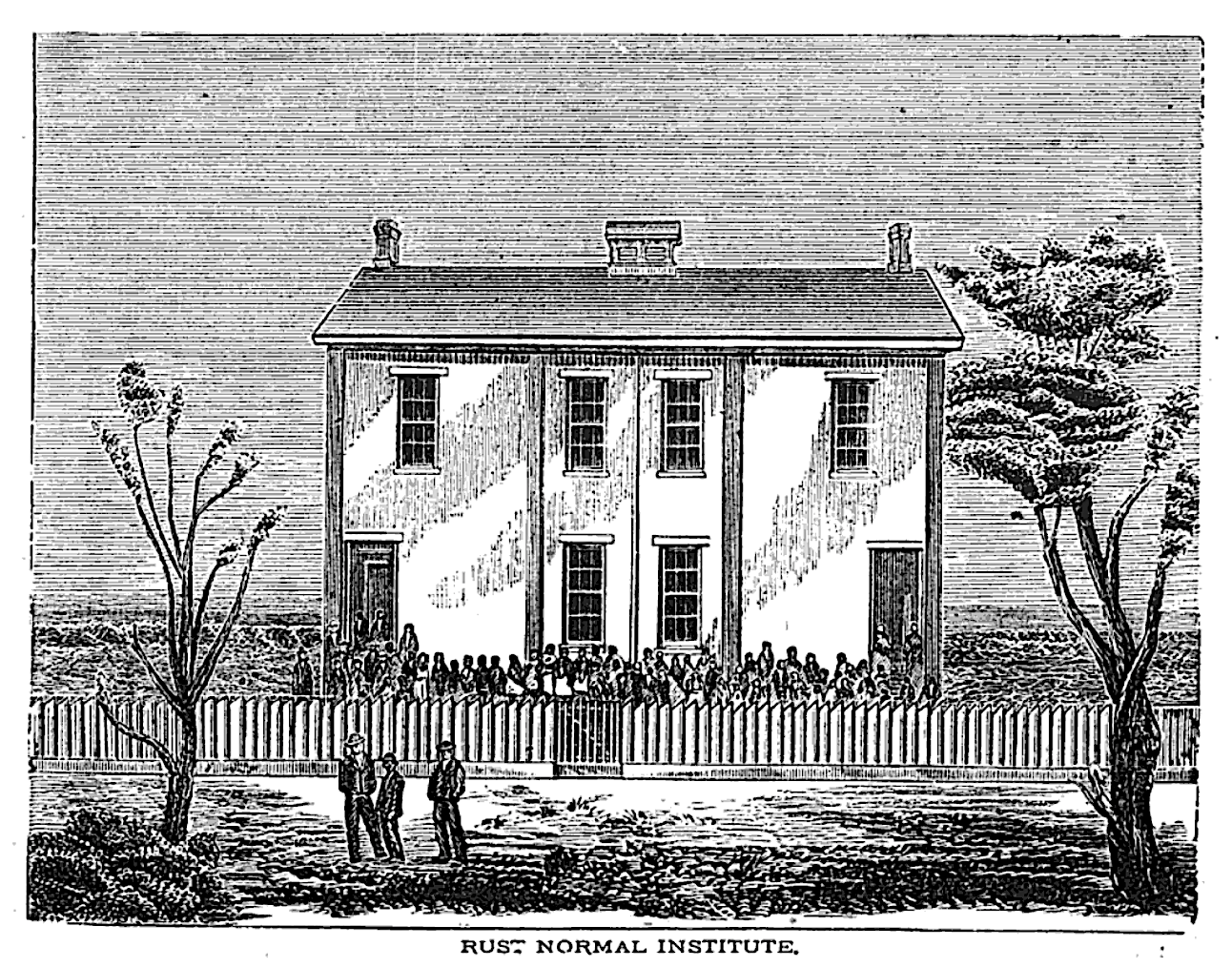
Rust Normal Institute (c. 1886) in Huntsville, Alabama

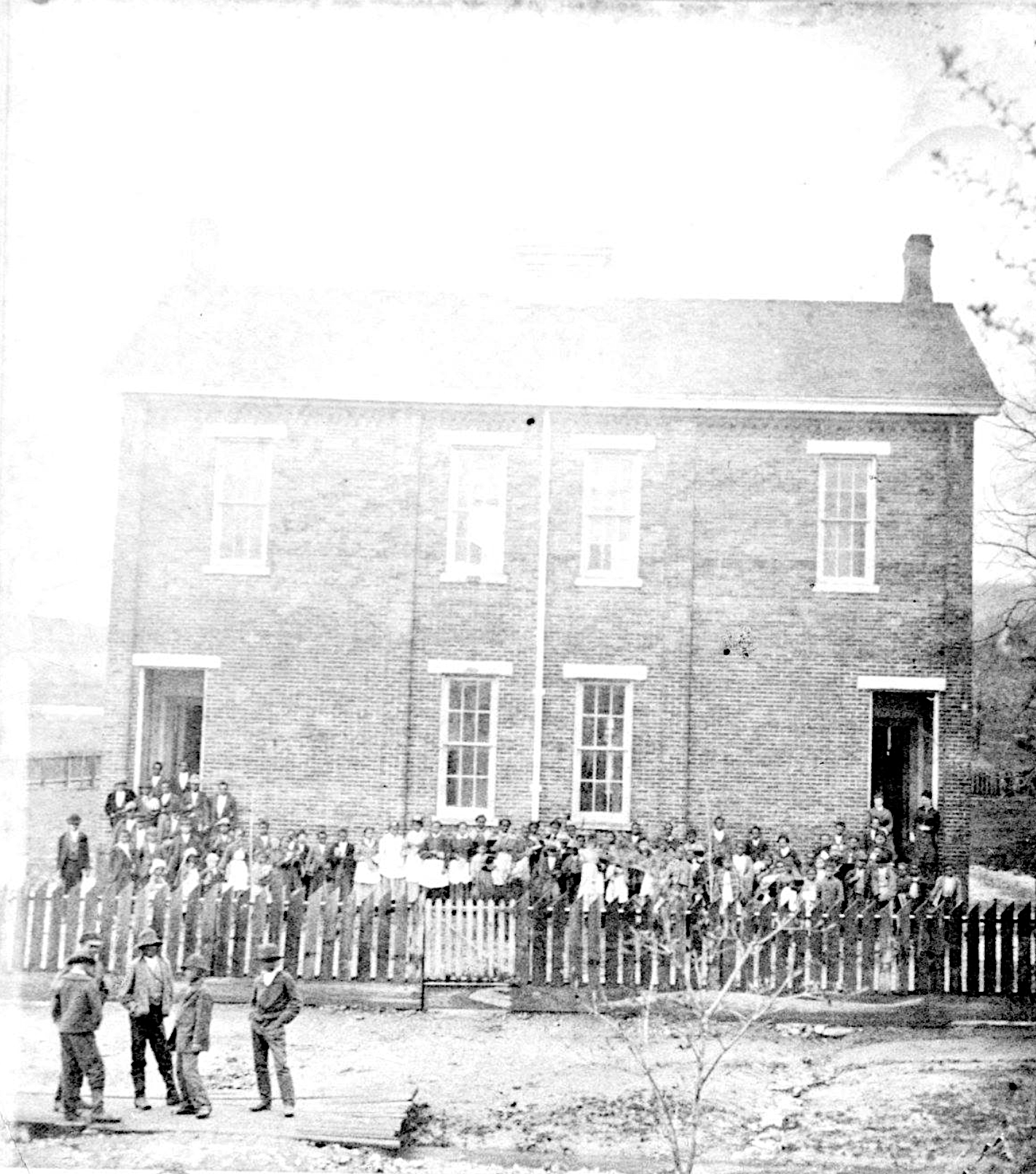
Rust Normal Institute

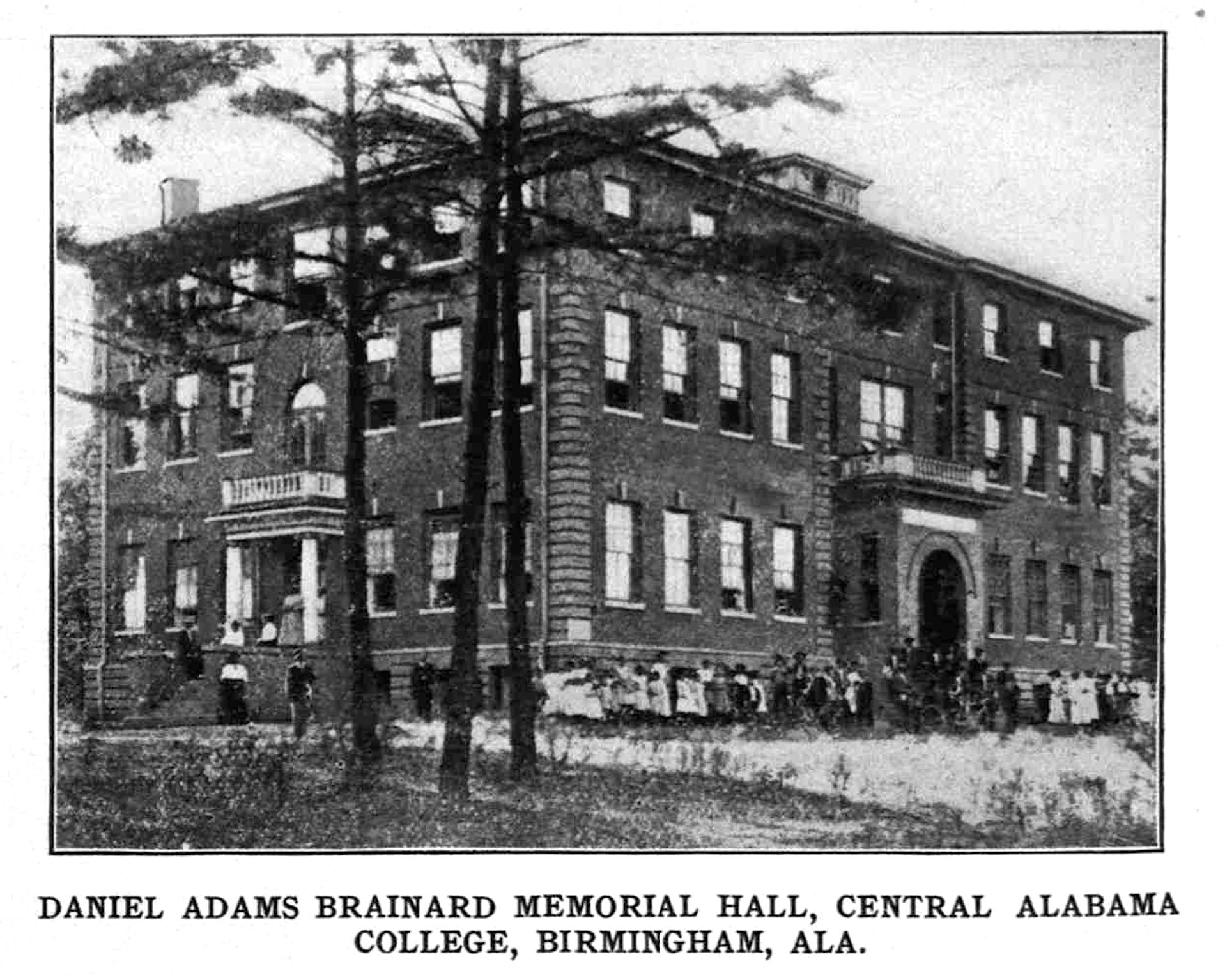
Daniel Adams Brainard̞ Memorial Hall at Central Alabama College, near Birmingham, Alabama

It was established under the name the Rust Institute, as a school to train African American teachers in Alabama in 1865. The Pittsburg Aid Society sent the earliest teachers to the school, and the following year in 1866 the Freedmen's Aid Society and the Methodist Episcopal Church took over the leadership. A two story brick building opened at the corner of Franklin Street and Townsend Avenue in Huntsville, Alabama in 1865.

It later changed the school name to Rust Normal Institute, followed by Rust Biblical and Normal Institute. From 1880 to 1881, the school had two instructors and 111 students, and was preparing to grow more. It became Central Alabama Academy in 1890.

In 1904 it moved to Mason City on the outskirts of Birmingham, Alabama, and reopened in 1905 as Central Alabama College. The Mason City location was founded by Rev. Madison C. B. Mason, working alongside the Freedmen's Aid Society, and the Methodist Episcopal Church. In 1922 its main building and other structures were struck by fire. It was not rebuilt or reopened. The Sherman Industrial Institute used a former Central Alabama Institute school building in Huntsville.

Jay Samuel Stowell wrote about the school in "Methodist Adventures in Negro Education" (1922).

== Notable people ==
Mary Martha Lakin, the daughter of Arad Simon Lakin, served as a teacher at the school in 1868. Margaret Walker (née Alexander) was born on the campus in 1915, where her father Rev. Sigismund Walker taught.

=== Principals ===
- E. Miner
- G.M.P. King
- Mary L. Raines
- H. H. Sutton

=== Presidents ===
- Robert Nathaniel Brooks
- Isaac Newton Pailor, from 1875 to 1876
- William Laurene Riley, from 1900 to ?
- Alexander Priestly Camphor (A.P. Camphor); from 1908 to 1916
- J. B. F. Shaw, from 1916 to ?

=== Notable alumni ===
- Anna E. Cooper
- William Laurene Riley, class of 1886
