= Claquato, Washington =

Former county seat of Lewis County, Washington

- Unincorporated community; former town
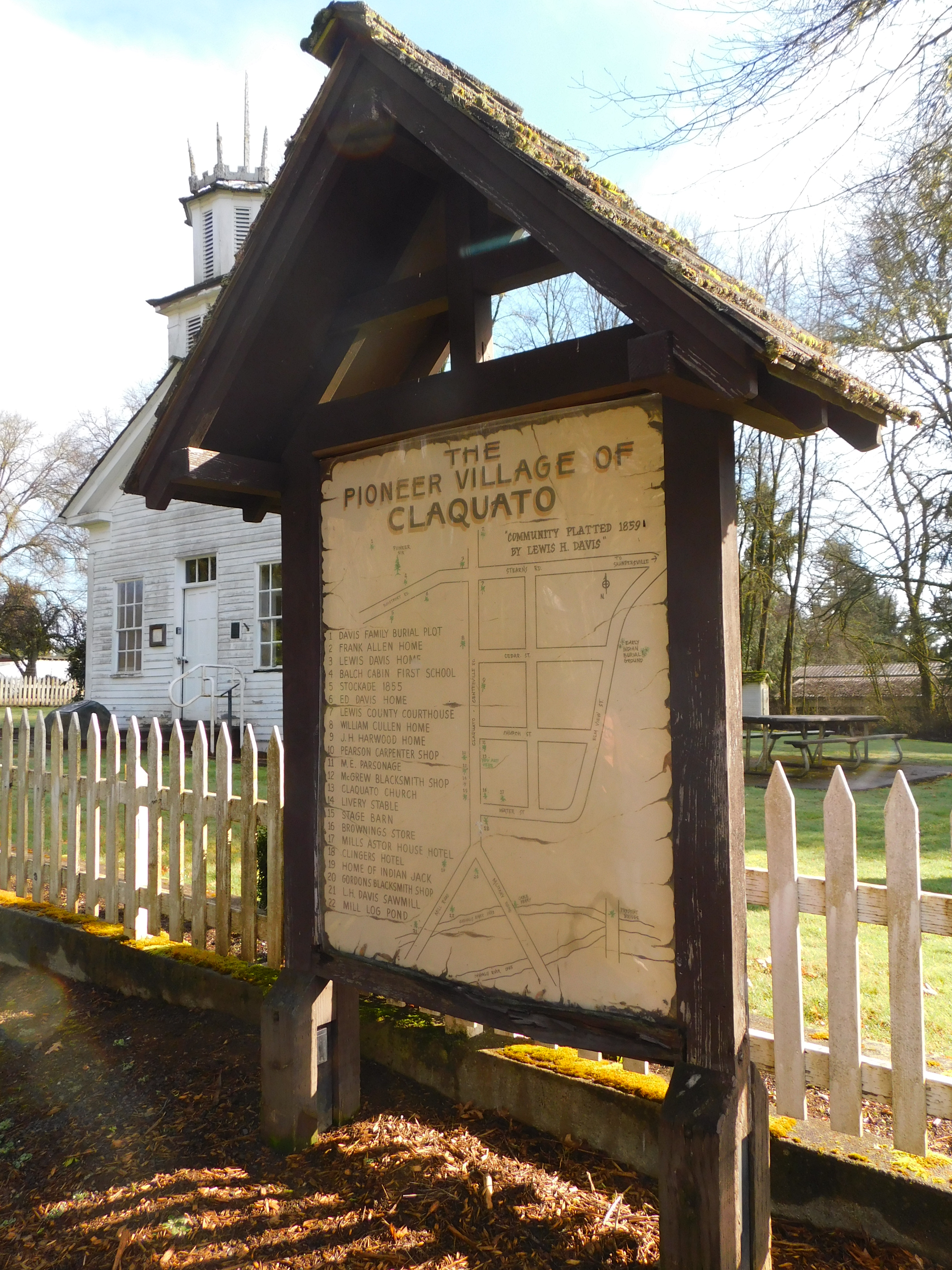
- Pioneer Village of Claquato interpretative map, 2025
- Etymology: Salishan languages: salish ("high ground")
- Location within Washington (state) Location within the United States
- Coordinates: 46°38′36.37″N 123°01′2.47″W
- Country: United States
- State: Washington
- County: Lewis
- Established: 1858
- Elevation: 200 ft (61 m)
- Time zone: UTC-8 (Pacific (PST))
  - Summer (DST): UTC-7 (PDT)
- zip code: 98522, 98532
- Area code: 360
- GNIS feature ID: 1510879

Claquato, Washington (cla-kwah'-toh) is a former town and present day unincorporated community located approximately 3 miles (4.8 km) southwest of Chehalis, near the Chehalis River off State Route 6. Claquato was once the county seat of Lewis County, Washington.

Claquato was founded by Lewis H. Davis in 1853 after he established a homestead upon a rise known as Claquato Hill. The settlers built a blockhouse in 1855 during the Puget Sound War. A post office was begun in 1858 under the name Davis Prairie, renamed later that year after the landform. The Salish word translates as, "high ground" or "high land".

The town grew to include hotels, mills, and shops, and was officially platted in 1858. Claquato became a waystation for travelers on their way to Olympia after Davis, his sons, and other residents built several roads, including Military Road, that led to the Davis homestead. The community became the county seat in 1862 after Davis donated land for the construction of the Claquato Courthouse. The local economy included brick manufacturing, mining, and timber production. A steamboat built by a Claquato pioneer operated on the Chehalis River, transporting crops and goods to Olympia. The second known school district in Lewis County began in Claquato during 1855 and lasted until 1937.

The county seat designation was transferred to the town of Chehalis, then known as Saundersville, in 1874 after a Northern Pacific Railway line bypassed Claquato. The town began to wane, with residents moving to Chehalis. The courthouse was demolished in 1888 and into the 20th century, the Davis family holdings were sold off or lost. The town was officially "vacated" in April 1902 and postal duties were transferred to Littell, Despite a continuous population in Claquato, the community has been referred to as a ghost town.

Claquato Church and Claquato Cemetery are landmarks in the community and a marker of the Oregon Trail, originally an idea of Ezra Meeker was installed. A dance hall known as Playquato, which featured performances by several famous country musicians, existed between 1938 and the mid-1970s.

== Etymology ==
Claquato, pronounced as "cla-kwah'-toh", is a Salish word translated to mean, "high ground" or "high land". An alternate translation is recorded as, an "open space at the top of a hill". The community was originally established under the name, Davis Prairie, on a hill eventually named after the town.

== History ==
=== 19th century ===
Claquato was founded by Lewis Hawkins (L.H.) Davis. (Note: The first name of L.H. Davis is sometimes spelled as "Louis". See sources throughout the article for the discrepancy.) He and his wife, Susan, along with their seven children, migrated west by ox wagon in 1851 after joining a wagon train in Independence, Missouri. First settling in the Willamette Valley, the family traveled north to Saunder's Bottom, or present-day Chehalis, Washington, in 1853. He and his oldest sons "scouted the area" to find a place suitable for their own homestead. After a few days, Davis submitted a 640-acre (260 ha) donation land claim.

The Davis family immediately erected a one-room log cabin on the land. The home, located on the west side of Military Road, was also described as later becoming a two-story, three room cabin, with a breezeway separating the bottom floor rooms. Davis built two other homes for his family by 1867; the original cabin was demolished in either 1872 or 1873.

Around 1858, Davis, his sons, and other settlers began constructing roads in the area, including a 6-mile (9.7 km) road to the confluence of the Chehalis and Skookumchuck rivers. The town's elevation above the muddier Chehalis Valley became advantageous and a 12 foot (3.7 m)-wide puncheon road connecting present-day Longview to Olympia was constructed through Claquato after Lewis donated land for the project. Known as Military Road, the thoroughfare was located on the eastern border of Claquato; (Note: The section of Military Road through Claquato is hypothesized to have crossed the Chehalis River at Water Street.) a bridge was built over the Chehalis River, one of only two spans constructed over a waterway for the road. The steep climb of the hillside was known as "Chain Hill", due to the use of chains on the brakes of wagons to safely allow the descent of vehicles. Another road was built by the Davis family in 1859, which connected the town to Newaukum. (Note: The roads built by the Davis family in the 1850s were noted to have been done without grants from the government, or completed surveys. Remnants of Military Road in Claquato and Lewis County are sparse and the thoroughfare is considered mostly lost.) The new roads all led to the Davis homestead and the efforts have been theorized to have been undertaken as a means to elevate the community economically over nearby Saundersville, known in the present day as Chehalis.

The community, in 1855, built a 100-square-foot (9.3 m^{2}) stockade that featured two corner blockhouses. (Note: The Claquato blockhouse was first constructed beginning in autumn 1855 and completed during the spring season the following year.) The structure was known as the Claquato Stockade or Claquato Fort and was constructed during fears over potential Native American attacks during the Puget Sound War. Along with approximately six other families, the founders of the city of Chehalis, the Saunders family, lived in the blockhouse in 1855. The cramped conditions of the fort, along with growing fears of attacks, led to "discontent and some ill feeling" between the families, some of whom opted to move back to their own claims. No battles occurred, nor were any shots fired at the stockade. (Note: The Saunders cabin was set on fire, and some of their livestock were killed, as they lived at the Claquato Blockhouse. Lewis Davis was reported to be a supporter of women's rights during the war.) The blockhouse was "torn down gradually" and remnants were noted to have remained into the 1880s.

Davis grist mill, c. 1890

After the concerns subsided, community members returned to their homes and in 1857, Davis built a waterwheel-powered sawmill on Mill Creek. He also began a grist mill. The Davis family improved their homestead to include facilities for travelers; accommodations included lodging and meals, as well as a corral and stable.

A Chehalis River landing located at Adna served the Claquato community, bringing goods, military personnel, and visitors from as far as Fort Steilacoom and Fort Vancouver. The town grew to include a general store and two hotels, (Note: In 1867, the "well known" hostelry in Claquato was given the name, Union Hotel or Clinger Hotel, and was owned by J.D. Clinger. He placed the relatively new hostelry for sale as "cheap" and under easy terms. The hotel contained a dairy, a garden with fruit trees, and a livery yard for horses and wagons.) as well as shops for blacksmiths and carpenters. A telegraph line was constructed through Claquato in 1860. The town was briefly known to be the largest settlement between Olympia and the Columbia River. Claquato was as a stage coach stop for travelers, with the community becoming a popular waystation; vistitors camped under the Pioneer Tree. Civil War generals, such as Ulysses Grant and William Sherman, stopped at the Davis claim while traveling in the area. By 1864, the population had reached 50 people, but decades later was referred to as "scarcely more than a trading post" in The Chehalis Bee-Nugget Historical Souvenir Edition.

=== Post office and county seat ===
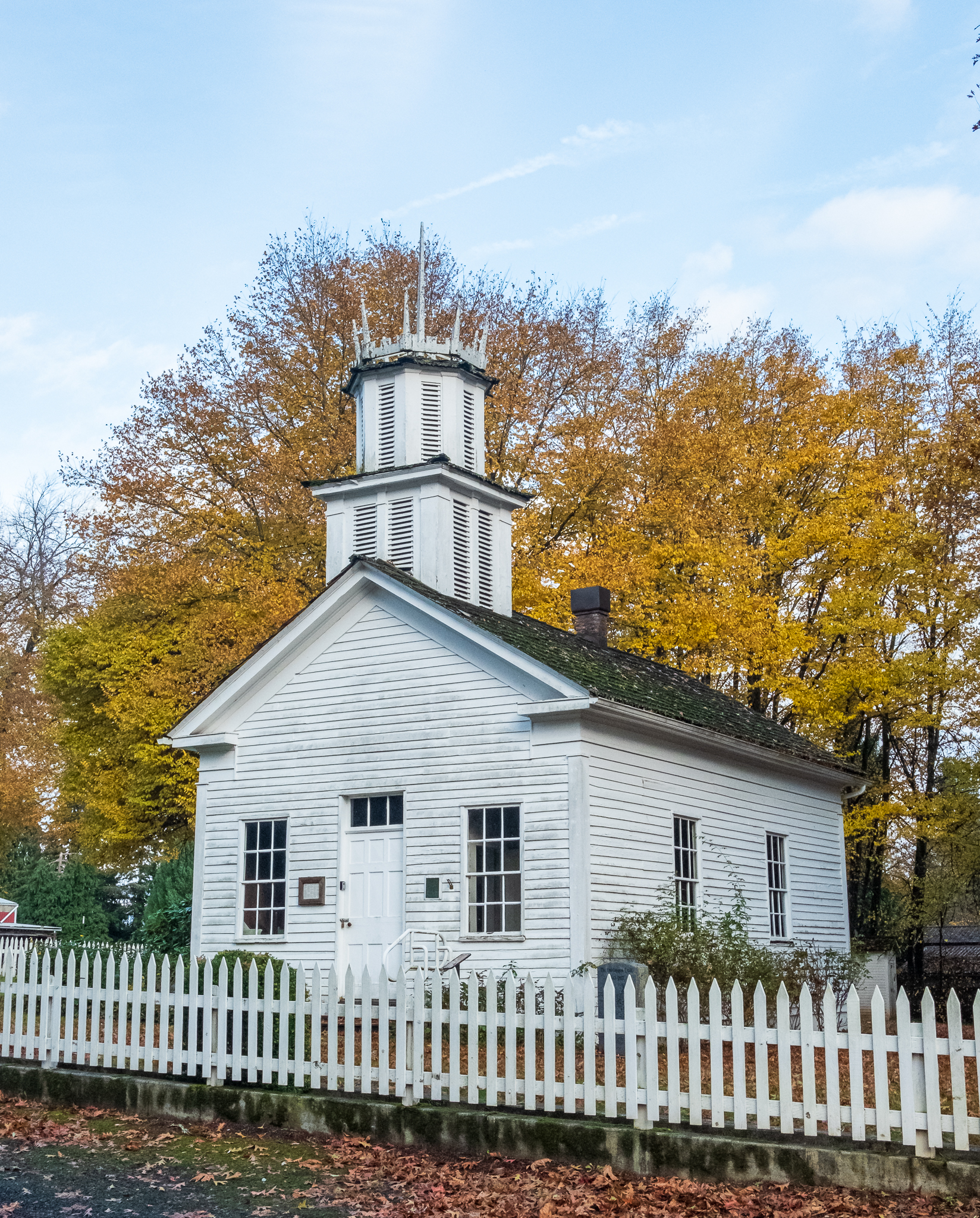
Claquato Church, 2020

The area was first known as Davis Prairie and the first post office was opened under the name on May 10, 1858, overseen by postmaster L. H. Davis. The post office changed management and was renamed as Claquato a few months later on September 15. (Note: The renaming of the post office from Davis Prairie to Claquato is usually reported as September 15, 1858, though some sources mention the change may have occurred the following day. See sources throughout the article for the discrepancy.) The route became popular by 1860, with a four-horse stagecoach delivering mail six days a week to Grand Prairie, located between Winlock and St. Urban.

Davis hired Henry Stearns, a fellow pioneer in the community, to survey the prairie and plat a town. The plat was filed with the county on July 18, 1858. The town contained sixty, 60 ft × 165 ft (18 m × 50 m) lots. Four streets were named - Cedar, Church, East, and Water; by 1938, only Water Street remained.

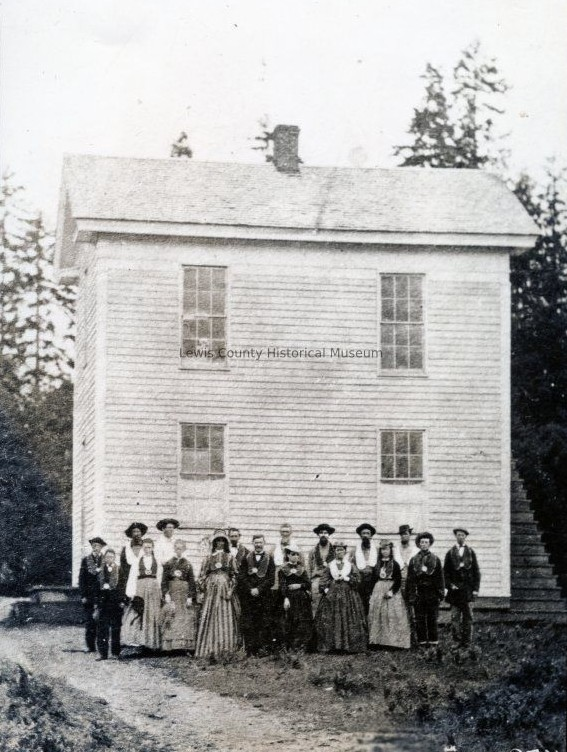
Claquato Courthouse, 1869

The state legislature offered the title of county seat to Claquato in 1862, under the proposal that L.H. Davis deed land for a courthouse. Davis donated a 161 ft × 250 ft (49 m × 76 m) parcel and constructed a two-story building that became known as Claquato Courthouse. Claquato became the county seat for Lewis County that same year. During Claquato's tenure as county seat, the town hosted an 1865 convention to nominate county delegates to represent the Washington Territory at the United States House of Representatives.

A Northern Pacific Railway track was constructed in 1873 in the valley; the railroad was built through the town of Chehalis, rather than Claquato. A meeting to discuss "active measures" to facilitate the transfer of the county seat to Chehalis was noted to have been "at once taken" by William West, known as the "father of Chehalis". An assembly was held in Claquato that led to a petition to the territorial legislature to approve the change. The legislature passed a bill the last day of session, November 11, 1873, transferring the county seat to Chehalis, which also included the requirement for the construction of a new courthouse. The county seat was officially transferred by the territorial legislature to Chehalis, also known at the time as Saundersville, on August 1, 1874. (Note: The date of the transfer of the county seat to Chehalis has often been listed as occurring on July 4, 1874. The territorial act transferring the county seat states in Section 1 that the reassignment "shall and remain" in the town of Saundersville "from and after the first day of August, A.D., 1874".)

Residents of Claquato began moving to Chehalis, and the community dwindled, later becoming described as a ghost town. The courthouse was used for other purposes before being demolished in 1888. In April 1882, W.H.H. Davis sold approximately 400 acres (160 ha) of his family's original homestead for $8,000 (equivalent to $266,897 in 2025); he remained in possession of a small parcel.

During a large flood event in 1897, the railroad bridge at Claquato was destroyed and the floodwaters were described as reaching a height never before recollected; reports stated that people could travel by boat and reach "half-way up the big hill" at Claqauto during the event. The bridge had been previously washed out during a flood in 1867. The 1897 span was rebuilt by February 1899 at a cost of $5,590 (equivalent to $216,333 in 2025).

=== Vacated and 20th century ===
Historical population
Census	Pop.	Note	%±
1870	147		—
1900	540		—
1910	1,485		175.0%
1920	497		−66.5%
1930	425		−14.5%
1940	474		11.5%
U.S. Decennial Census

Two brothers of Claquato's Hazzard family were noted to be part of an American force that captured Emilio Aguinaldo in March 1901. (Note: Claquato was described as, an "unheard of hamlet...somewhere over toward the Pacific Coast", in a news report of the Hazzard brother's involvement in the capture of Emilio Aguinaldo in 1901.)

Claquato, or its plat, is listed as being "officially vacated" on August 6, 1902, according to Lewis County records. The request was filed by H.C. Davis, which specifically included all alleys, blocks, and streets in the town. The Claquato post office was renamed as Littell by March 1903; C.R. Littell had previously become the Claquato postmaster in April 1902.

During his retracing of the Oregon Trail in 1906, Ezra Meeker received a $50 (equivalent to $1,935 in 2025) donation from H.C. Davis to purchase an ox for his expedition. Davis was also noted to have donated the same amount to erect a monument to mark the trail in Claquato.

In August 1915, a home built by Henry Davis upon the family's original homestead was destroyed by fire. The blaze was hypothesized to have been started by a "tramp" who dropped a match while searching for food. The home had been considered a landmark and among the "most beautiful and sightly" in the county.

=== Playquato ===
At the intersection of Old Highway 603 and State Route 6, a 0.5-acre (0.20 ha) dome building known as Playquato Dancehall (Note: Playquato is also spelled as Plaquato.) was constructed in 1938 by John and Ruby Marth. (Note: The Marth's daughter was Sandy Marth Hill.) The 8,200-square-foot (760 m^{2}) hall contained two dance floors, one measuring 50 ft × 100 ft (15 m × 30 m). The center, which did not serve alcohol, was known as "The Spot for Good Fun" and was named by a contest winner. Thousands of people were noted to attend on some Saturday evenings. Playquato was known for hosting country music events, several musicians from the Grand Ole Opry played at the hall, including Loretta Lynn and Hank Williams, as well as the group, Maddox Brothers and Rose. Other musicians to perform included Bobby Darin, Lefty Frizzell, Ferlin Husky, Buck Owens, Don Rich, and Tex Williams, who performed regularly.

Playquato closed in 1970 and due to arson, the vacant and often vandalized building burned down on May 17, 1975. (Note: A firetruck used to fight the Playquato blaze had been paid for by funds once raised at a Fireman's Ball held at the hall in 1960.) A convenience store was built on the site two years later. As part of a 2026 exhibit on Playquato, a Clarendon piano from the hall was donated to the Lewis County Historical Museum.

=== Davis family ===
Henry Davis home, c. 1901

Lewis Hawkins (L.H.) Davis was a settler from Vermont and was born in Windsor County during May 1794 or 1797. Davis served as a captain during the War of 1812 and Black Hawk War. Moving near Fort Wayne, Indiana in his late-20s to be a partner in a sawmill business, he married Susan A. Clinger in 1829; Clinger, born in Harrisburg, Pennsylvania and of Bavarian German descent, was 20 years old at the time.

Davis served as a county commissioner and as a district representative of Chehalis, where he helped create a petition that led to the formation of the Washington Territory. Suffering from lasting effects after being injured from a fall at one of his mills, Lewis Davis died on October 22, 1864. (Note: The gravestone for Lewis Davis records his death as occurring on November 18, 1864.) The flag at the Claquato Courthouse, created by women in his family as well as other ladies in Claquato, was lowered to half staff in his honor. (Note: There are no known photos of Lewis H. Davis. He was described as resembling Ulysses S Grant. Davis has also been recounted as short, stocky, with a "grave and serious face". He was noted to be reserved in speech but "kind in his home".)

The Davis' had five sons and two daughters. One son, Harry, died in 1901. The founder of Cora, Washington was another son, Levi Adrian (L.A.) Davis; he died in September 1901, possibly of a heart condition. The youngest brother, Austin L. Davis, served as postmaster for Claquato and as treasurer for the county. He also operated a mercantile business in Newaukum and became a farmer. Suffering from a similar heart ailment, he was found dead on a road leading from Chehalis in June 1892, still holding the reins of two horses.

G.G. Davis invented and filed a patent for the "Davis Raft" in 1913; the 70 ft × 120 ft (21 m × 37 m) long raft was used to transport "three tiers of 40 foot (12 m) logs", or as much as 1 million board feet, over rough waters.

== Geography ==
Claquato is located upon a slight hill known as Claquato Hill and is situated approximately 3 miles (4.8 km) southwest of Chehalis off State Route 6. During the town's peak, Claquato has been described in various terms, such as a "major village" or "metropolis". After the loss of the county seat designation, Claquato has been referred to as a ghost town, depending on the source. (Note: Claquato may be referred to as a ghost town erroneously due to a misinterpretation of the word "vacate" on the disincorporation filings with Lewis County in 1902. See sources throughout the article.)

== Arts and culture ==
=== Events and festivals ===
An annual event known as the Pioneer Pie Social was held at Claquato Church. The social was used to raise funds for the Lewis County Historical Museum. Begun in 2005, the event was moved to Fort Borst Park in 2018.

=== Historic buildings and sites ===
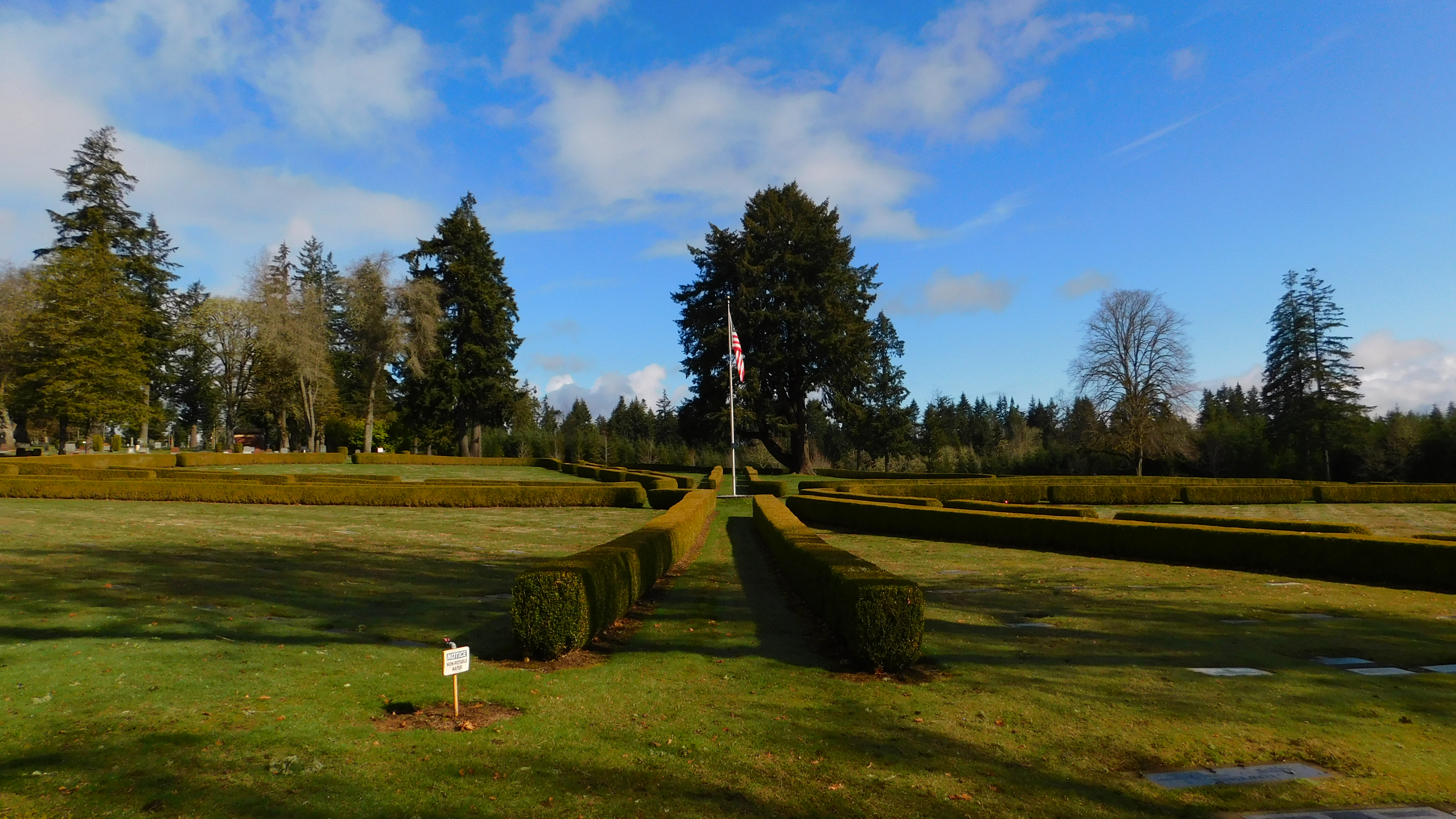
Claquato Cemetery, 2025

Claquato Church is the oldest standing church in Washington state. The structure was listed to the National Register of Historic Places in 1973.

The Claquato Cemetery, established by the Davis family in 1856, is located one block north of the church and is situated upon a portion of the original Davis land claim. The grounds are home to the "Pioneer Fir", a Douglas fir that was used as a waypoint in the early days of pioneer travel. Fastened to the tree is a bronze plaque that honors the first non-Native settlers in Claquato.

The Claquato Courthouse was located north of Claquato Church and was built in 1862 over a six month period led by John D. Clinger, Susan Davis's brother who later became a Lewis County judge. The two-story courthouse was constructed with lumber supplied by the Davis family sawmill. After the county seat shifted to Chehalis, the courthouse was converted at times to be of use as a schoolhouse, Grange Hall, and as a cheese factory. The building was demolished in 1888.

=== Religion ===
Westminster Presbyterian Church, located in Chehalis since 1882, began as a congregation in Claquato inside the Davis cabin during a service on October 6, 1855. The group helped to build the multi-denominational Claquato Church.

== Government and politics ==
Presidential Elections Results Claquato Precinct
Year	Republican	Democratic	Third parties
2008	62.1% 295	36.4% 173	1.5% 7
2012	68.5% 341	30.1% 150	1.4% 7
2016	67.9% 334	23.4% 115	8.7% 43
2020	70.3% 435	26.3% 163	3.4% 21
2024	65.8% 404	28.7% 176	5.5% 34

=== Politics ===
As Claquato is an unincorporated community, there are no defined bounds, and the precinct may be incongruous with the census boundaries.

The 2020 election included votes for candidates of the Libertarian Party and 6 votes for write-in candidates. In the 2024 election, there were 13 votes cast for write-in candidates and 17 votes were tallied for Robert F. Kennedy Jr..

== Economy ==
J.T. Browning store and residence, 1866

The first known kiln brick produced in Lewis County occurred in Claquato in the 1850s. A businessman in the community, J.T. Browning, ordered the build of a 40 metric tons (40 t) steamboat, known as the Carrie Steamer, in 1866. The vessel was meant to transport his general merchandise goods, as well as crops from the community, to Olympia via the Chehalis and Black rivers. Browning, who also migrated from Fort Wayne, had previously built and operated a general store at the corner of Military Road and Water Street in 1863; other than a trading post under the Hudson Bay Company, it was the only known store between Portland and Olympia.

The Claquato Courthouse was converted by 1878 for use as a butter and cheese factory. The main floor housed production with other portions were used for storage. The "rich golden color" cheese was created from milk supplied from up to seven dairy farms in the community.

A 400-acre (160 ha) lignite coal mine that contained an 8 foot (2.4 m) vein was located approximately 3 miles (4.8 km) from Claquato; the mine opened in early 1901. A spur line was to be constructed to deliver coal, as well as possible logged timber from the area, to the Northern Pacific track at the town. Bunkerage in the community was offered to the mine company, known as Crescent Coal Mining Company.

== Education ==
The first known schoolhouse was the log cabin home of L.A. Davis. The designation for the Claquato School District was No. 2. An early three-month school term was recorded as beginning on January 1, 1855 and a second semester starting during autumn 1855. The school's second-term teacher was considered "eccentric" and had a "mental capacity (that) was very limited", but with the use of a collection of hazel switches, "made up for it by liberal expenditure of muscle".

The Claquato Church was used as the next school in the town. Known as the Claquato Academy, the original deed for the church stipulated that the building had to be made available for use as a schoolhouse for seven years. The church's first pastor and the school's first teacher, Rev. Joh Harper, created a sign for the academy that was displayed for ten years over the entrance. Claquato Academy has been considered the first public school located between Fort Steilacoom and Olympia and as the second school district in Washington. Beginning in 1868, Elizabeth Mackintosh became a teacher at the academy. Mackintosh was the first woman to ever hold an elected position in the Washington Territory Legislature, serving as an enrolling clerk in 1869.

A third school was built "across the river" in Claquato. The last schoolhouse in Claquato was built in 1873 on the same site and was used until January 1937 when the building burned down. The student body, recorded to be 20, attended classes at West Side School in Chehalis.

After the fire, Claquato residents initially rejected an offer to consolidate with the Chehalis School District during a vote in March 1937. (Note: The March 1937 vote was approved by Chehalis residents by a ratio of 22:1. In Claquato, there were 53 votes against the consolidation and 33 in favor.) Residents voted against a proposal to rebuild a two-room schoolhouse In April; the referendum failed by two votes. At the end of May, another vote was held to consolidate with Chehalis, and the measure passed, 64 in favor and 8 against the proposal.

By 1938, the schoolhouse site was tilled and used as testing grounds for over three dozen varieties of alfalfa and oats; the project was led by a Chehalis chapter of the Future Farmers of America.

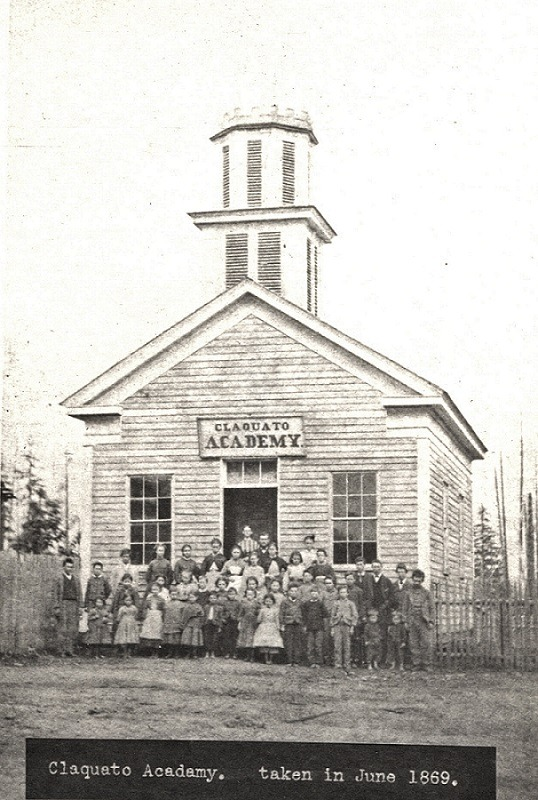
Claquato Academy, 1869

Claquato School, c. 1890

Claquato School, date unknown

== Notable people ==
- Henry C. Davis, son of Lewis Davis, pharmacist and real estate businessman
- Phoebe Judson, pioneer and author
