= Anna E. Cooper =

Liberian educator (1897–1988)

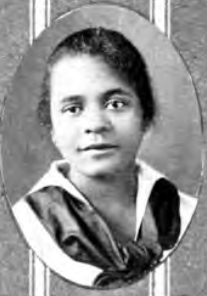
- Anna E. Cooper, from the 1921 Howard University yearbook.
- Born: August 22, 1897; Monrovia, Liberia
- Died: 1988 (aged 90–91); Liberia
- Occupation: Educator
- Known for: Dean of the University of Liberia
- Children: James T. Phillips Jr
- Honours: Humane Order of African Redemption (1978)

Anna E. Cooper (July 22, 1897 – 1988) was a Liberian educator, she was the first female dean of the University of Liberia.

== Early life and education ==
Cooper was born in Monrovia, Liberia, into a large and influential Americo-Liberian family. Her father was Jesse Randolph Cooper; her mother was Sarah Braxton Cooper Barclay; one sister was Magdalene L. Cooper Dennis, Liberia's first university trained nurse; another sister was Cecelia Adeline Cooper who married ambassador Charles D. B. King, who was Liberia's president from 1920 to 1930. Her brothers Henry R. Cooper and Charles E. Cooper were also in government.

Cooper studied at the College of West Africa in Monrovia. She went to the United States in 1914, and attended Central Alabama Institute, Morgan State College, and finally Howard University, where she played basketball, was a member of Alpha Kappa Alpha and earned a bachelor's degree in 1921. She returned to the United States in 1931, earning a master's degree at Teachers College, Columbia University. She also studied in London.

== Career ==
Cooper taught at the College of West Africa from 1922 to 1928, and then as a science professor at Liberia College from 1929 to 1931, teaching chemistry and physics. In 1933, she organized the college's science department. Cooper became Dean of Administration at Liberia College, the first woman to be a dean at the school. She led the school's transformation into the University of Liberia in 1951. She retired in 1956.

She was a founder of the first overseas chapter of Alpha Kappa Alpha, when she and others petitioned for a chapter in Monrovia in 1954. She was also active with the YWCA in Liberia. In 1978, she was honored by President William Tolbert, installed as a Knight Official in the Humane Order of African Redemption.

== Personal life ==
Cooper's son, James T. Phillips Jr., was a soil scientist and cabinet minister, executed during a military coup in 1980. Cooper died in 1988, aged 91 years.
