= Sherman Industrial Institute =

Defunct school in Alabama, US

- Huntsville, Alabama, United States

Information
- Former name: North Huntsville School
- School type: Private Black nonsectarian
- Established: 1891

Sherman Industrial Institute was a private, nonsectarian, elementary school for African Americans in Huntsville, Alabama, U.S. It was previously named North Huntsville School.

== History ==
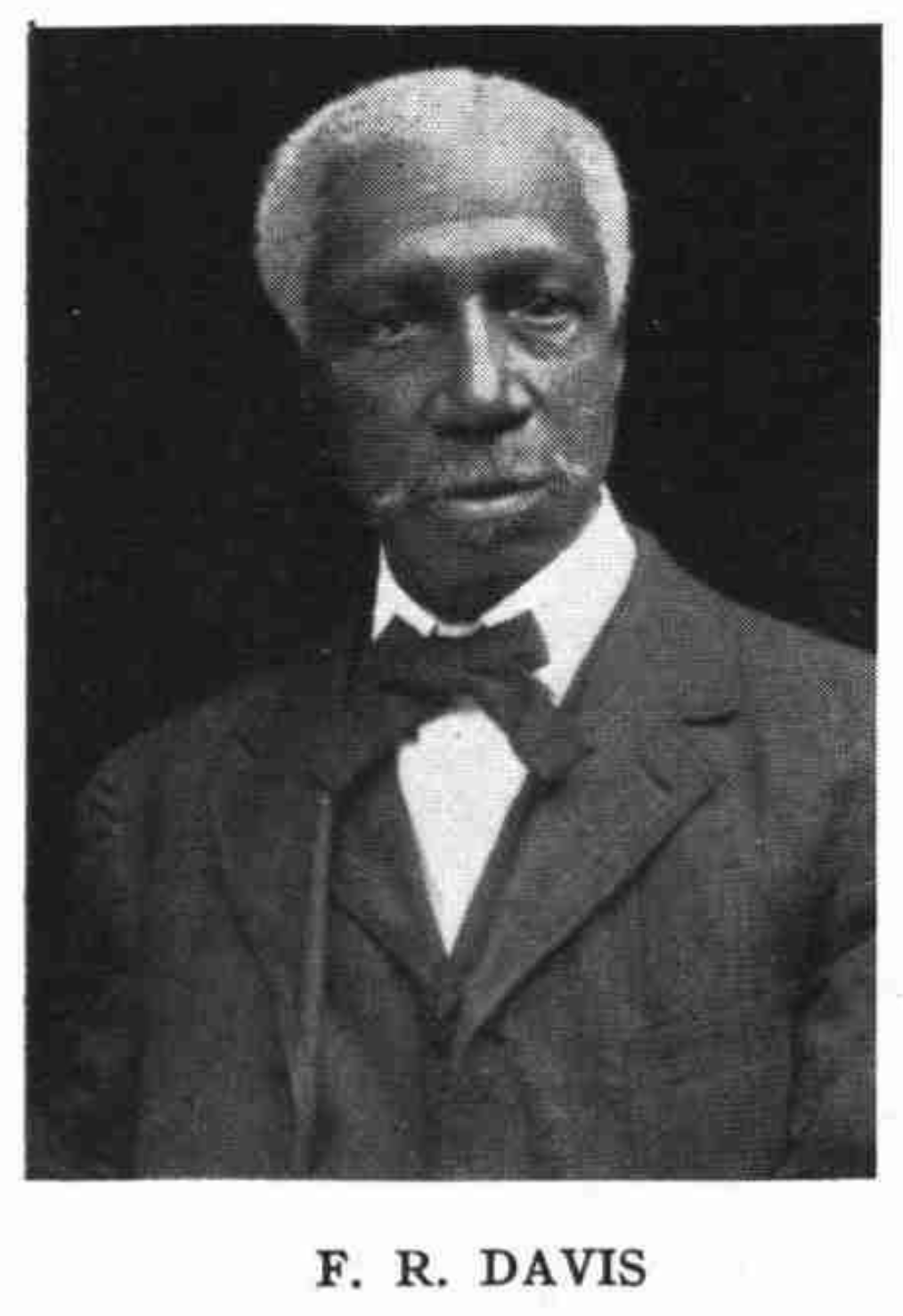
F. R. Davis, former principal

North Huntsville School organized in 1891. The name was changed in 1804 to honor Union Army general William Tecumseh Sherman. One of the school's sites was previously owned by the Freedman's Aid Society and had been home to Central Alabama Academy.

F. R. Davis served as principal of Sherman Industrial Institute. Teachers at the school were African American. In 1922, Sherman Industrial Institute was reported to have 5 teachers for its 180 students.
