= Alexander Priestly Camphor =

American bishop, educator, academic administrator (1865–1919)

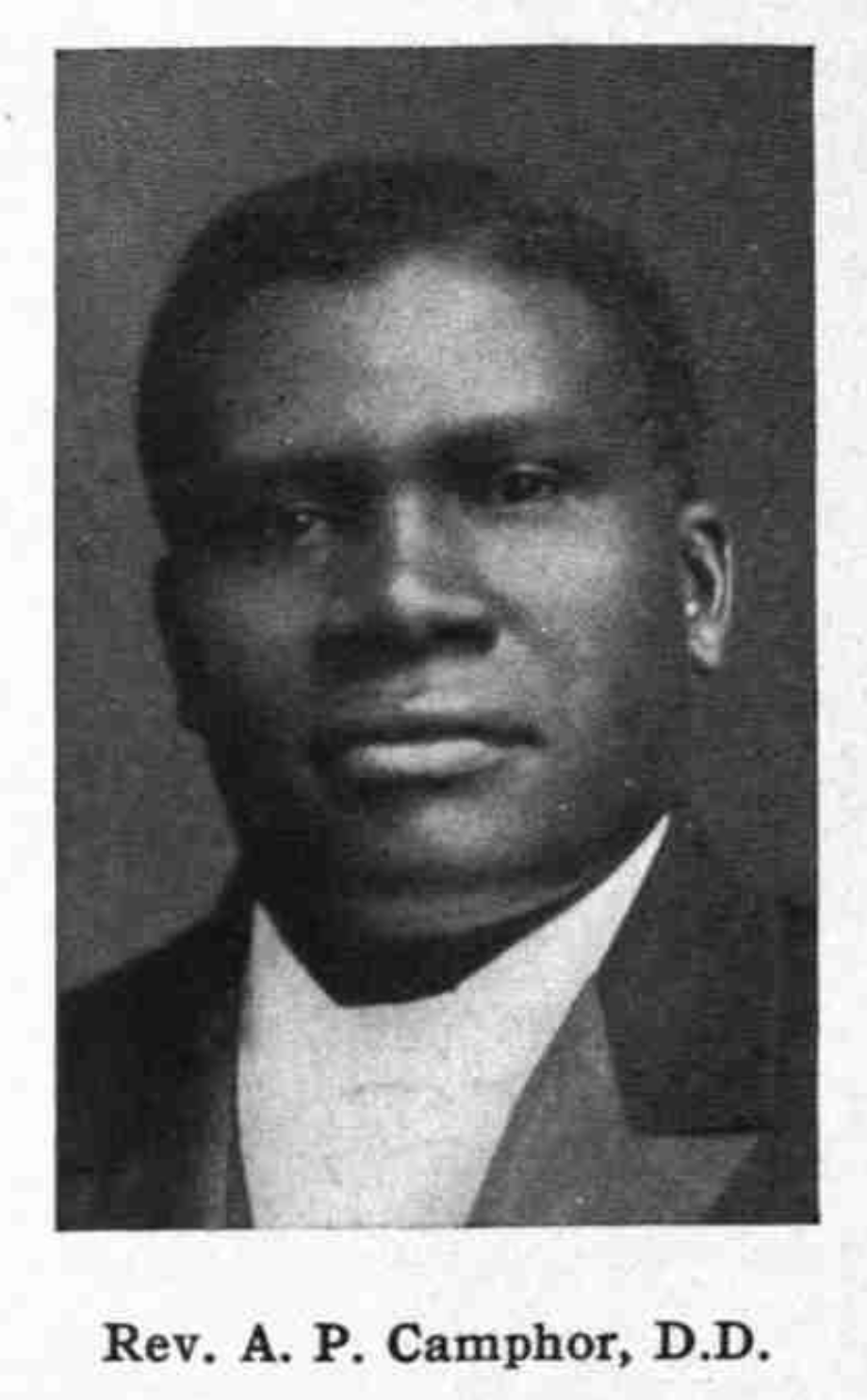

President of College of West Africa
- In office 1897–1907

President of Central Alabama College
- In office 1908–1916

Personal details
- Born: Alexander Camphor; August 9, 1865 Jefferson Parish, Louisiana, U.S.
- Died: December 10, 1919 (aged 54) South Orange, New Jersey, U.S.
- Spouse(s): Mamie Anna Rebecca Weathers (or Wheathers; m. c. 1893–?)
- Education: New Orleans University (A.B., A.M., D.D.), Gammon Theological Seminary (B.D., D.D.), Columbia University, Union Theological Seminary
- Occupation: Bishop, missionary, educator, academic administrator, author, college president

Alexander Priestly Camphor (1865 – 1919), also known as A.P. Camphor, was an American Bishop, missionary, educator, academic administrator, author, and college president. He was the Missionary Bishop of the Methodist Episcopal Church, elected in 1916. He served as president of Central Alabama College and the College of West Africa. Camphor Hall at Dillard University, New Orleans is named in his honor.

== Biography ==
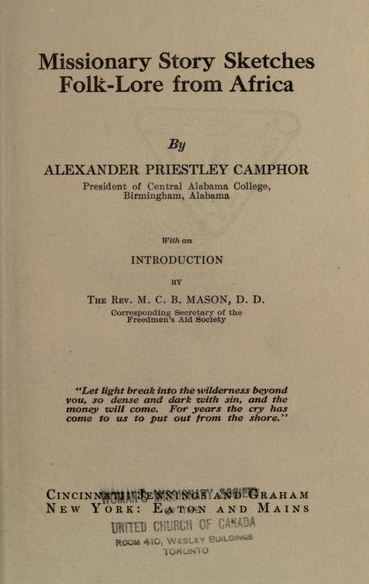
Missionary Story Sketches and Folk-Lore from Africa (1909) by Camphor

Alexander Camphor born on August 9, 1865, on a Louisiana sugar plantation in Jefferson Parish, and was the son of enslaved parents named Elizabeth and Perry Camphor. He was adopted as a child after the death of his parents by Stephen Priestly, a white Methodist preacher. He attended the Freedmen's Aid Society schools during the Reconstruction era.

He graduated with an A.B. degree from New Orleans University in 1887, and later taught mathematics there for four years while also organizing the Friends of Africa Society. After graduating with a D.D. degree from Gammon Theological Seminary in 1895, he completed postgraduate work at Columbia University and Union Theological Seminary in New York.

In either 1893 or 1895, Camphor married Mamie Anna Rebecca Weathers (or Wheathers) from Columbus, Ohio. Mamie was born November 27, 1869, in Woodville, Mississippi. By all accounts, she was an educated woman. She was Alexander's active partner in missionary work, raising interest and support for their joint work.

In 1896, the Camphors were assigned to the Methodist Monrovia Seminary in Liberia. Within a year, they had reorganized the seminary, increased enrollment, and proposed an expanded organization and facility. Its charter included providing high school education. a degree-granting courses in ministry, and dormitory facilities for male and female students. The name was also changed to the College of West Africa Monrovia. Camphor served as its President from 1897 – 1907.

In May 1916, he was made Bishop of Africa by the General Methodist Episcopal Conference and served in this capacity until 1919 at which time the Camphors returned to the U.S. They intended to return to Liberia. However, Alexander became ill from pneumonia in October 1919 and died at his home in South Orange, New Jersey the following December.

After the death of her husband, Mamie Camphor spent two months with relatives in New Orleans, Baton Rouge, and Jackson, Mississippi, before returning to her home in Orange, New Jersey. In March 1920, she began visiting cities in the American south to recruit students for the ministry as a member of a team under the auspices of the Interchurch World Movement. Her 1927 voter registration card indicates that she was living in Orange, New Jersey; however, the souvenir program of the Sixty-second Session of the Louisiana Annual Conference of the Methodist Episcopal Church held in 1929 noted that she was living in Philadelphia. Articles that appeared in The Baltimore Afro-American in the early 1940s described her active public and social life in Philadelphia and she was mentioned in a 1942 column in the same newspaper as having attended an Urban League dinner in Newark. Although she lived for another ten years, there is little information on that period. An obituary in the New York Times indicated that she had been living in Orange, New Jersey, and was actively involved at St. John's Methodist Church and several other local institutions. She was survived by a sister, Ruth Spellman, who lived in New Orleans, and two foster daughters. The place of her interment is unknown.

Camphor had several achievements during his lifetime. In addition to being the namesake of the church in Minnesota, there are three other United Methodist churches named in his honor, located in Baton Rouge, Philadelphia, and Monrovia, Liberia.

== See also ==
- List of bishops of the United Methodist Church
