= Cora, Washington =

Former community in Lewis County, Washington

- Former community, locale
- Levi Adrian Davis, 1891

- Location within Washington (state) Location within the United States
- Coordinates: 46°32′09″N 121°47′24″W
- Country: United States
- State: Washington
- County: Lewis
- Established: 1888
- Elevation: 948 ft (289 m)
- Time zone: UTC-8 (Pacific (PST))
  - Summer (DST): UTC-7 (PDT)
- ZIP Code: 98377
- Area code(s): 360, 564

Cora was a former farming community and is a locale in Lewis County, Washington, United States. Cora is located off U.S. Route 12, next to the Cowlitz River between the towns of Randle and Packwood.

== History ==
Cora was established in either 1886 or 1888 (Note: Most news articles on Cora agree that 1888 was the original founding year, however some reports and other sources place the founding of the Davis homestead in 1886.) by Levi A. Davis, son of the founder of Claquato, and was either named after Cora Davis, Levi's wife, or his niece, Cora M. Ferguson Patterson. At the time, Cora was far removed from other settlements, necessitating the need for supplies to be delivered by foot trails to the homestead. Levi Davis died in 1901.

A large portion of the Davis landholdings were sold in 1906 for $32,000 to the Chicago and North Western railroad, with plans to convert the acreage into a townsite and rail headquarters. The sons of Levi Davis were involved in lawsuits over ownership rights of coal lands near Cora in 1906 and 1907; successful in those proceedings, the coal disagreement reached the Supreme Court of the United States

The community, situated near the Cowlitz River, experienced its first recorded flood in 1896. In 1905, the town began providing a cable ferry, known as the Cora Ferry, which supplied service over the Cowlitz. The operation of the ferry was based on a lease and bids to operate the transport was often done on an annual basis. The ferry landing was moved in 1913 to another site within Cora, and a new transfer system was built the same year. A ferry accident involving the Cora occurred in 1915 that took 5 lives and by the following year, the service was discontinued after the completion of the Cora Bridge.

During World War I, a Red Cross auxiliary was formed in Cora in 1918. By the 1920s, the growing community had a grange and held a variety of events and dances at its hall. The grange building was converted into a community hall in 1923 which helped Cora accommodate a large gathering of regional grange members that same year.

=== Post office ===
A post office was established at Cora on June 11, 1890, and remained in operation until November 30, 1908. Operated exclusively during its run by members of the Davis family, the closure of the post office was due to a lack of anyone else in the community wanting to undertake the postmaster position.

== Geography ==
The community shares its names with the nearby Cora Falls, a waterfall near the Nisqually Entrance to Mount Rainier National Park, fed by Cora Lake.

== Education ==
Cora had a school as early as 1903. The log building was replaced in 1915 after a new one-room school site, at a cost of $500, was constructed between Cora and Lewis (present-day Packwood). The newer schoolhouse, which held summer classes, was reported as still existing by 1953.

== Infrastructure ==
In February 1899, the Washington House of Representatives received a state senate bill that had passed enacting the establishment of a state road from Cora, or Sulphur Springs (present-day Packwood), through the Cowlitz Pass to Cowiche. Later that month, the House Committee on Appropriations recommended that the project be indefinitely postponed. At the turn of the 20th century, rail lines were being built at or near Cora.

An overpass spanning over the Cowlitz River was first constructed in Cora in 1915 and became known as the Cora Bridge. Major road improvements to the area began in 1925, which connected the Cora community to Randle.
