= Jay Samuel Stowell =

American author

Jay Samuel Stowell (1883 - 1966) was an American author associated with the Methodist Episcopal Church. He died in St. Petersburg, Florida.

== Bibliography ==
- The Sunday-school Teacher and the Program of Jesus by George Harvey Trull and Jay Samuel Stowell (1915)
- Making Missions Real; Demonstrations and Map Talks for Teen Age Groups (1919). OCLC 680451760.
- Home Mission Trails (1920) Abingdon Press. OCLC 961099237.
- A study of Mexicans and Spanish Americans in the United States (1920). OCLC 671677211.
- Story-worship Programs for the Church School Year (1920). OCLC 681546909.
- The Near Side of the Mexican Question (1921). OCLC 577286185.
- Methodist Adventures in Negro Education (1922). OCLC 47795445.
- J. W. Thinks Black (1922). OCLC 259962982.
- The Child and America's Future (1923). OCLC 577342060.
- Methodism's New Frontier (1924). OCLC 609181596.
- Makers of a New World (1926). OCLC 4576058.
- Between the Americas (1930). OCLC 610605525.
