= Burlington Northern Depot (Chehalis, Washington) =

Historic site in Chehalis, Washington, US

- U.S. National Register of Historic Places
- Washington State Heritage Register
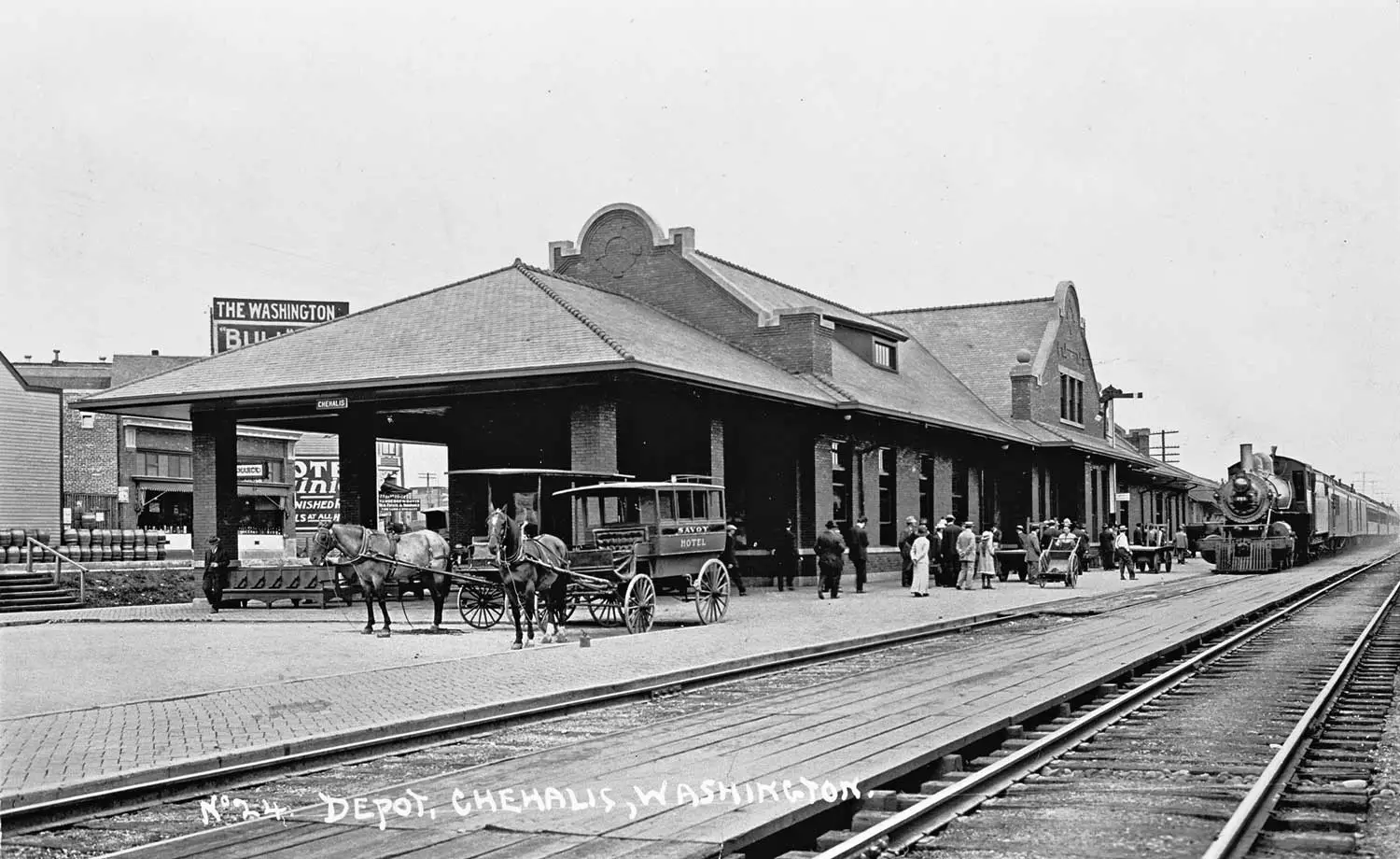
- Burlington Northern Depot, Chehalis, 1910s
- Location: 599 NW Front Street, Chehalis, Washington
- Coordinates: 46°39′56″N 122°58′18.3″W
- Area: less than one acre
- Built: 1912
- Built by: Northern Pacific Railway
- Architectural style: Mission Revival
- Restored: 1975-1978
- Restored by: Lewis County Historical Society; volunteers
- Website: Lewis County Historical Museum
- MPS: Chehalis MPS
- NRHP reference No.: 74001967

Significant dates
- Added to NRHP: November 6, 1974
- Designated WSHR: March 8, 1974

The Burlington Northern Depot is located in Chehalis, Washington. The structure was added to the National Register of Historic Places (NRHP) in 1974. The site is located within the Chehalis Downtown Historic District and borders the Pennsylvania Avenue-West Side Historic District, both NRHP-listed locations. As of 2026, the station is home to the Lewis County Historical Society and Museum.

Chehalis, then known as Saundersville, attempted to create a train stop and station during the 1870s after the build of a Northern Pacific Railway line through the developing town in 1872. After community-wide petitions and actions, which included flagging down passing trains to stop, the town received an official train stop in 1874.

The first station, known as the Northern Pacific Depot, was constructed in 1890 near the downtown core. The station was used as a stopping point by President Benjamin Harrison the following year and Theodore Roosevelt in 1903, who spoke from the McKinley Stump. Though the station remained in operation and brought economic prosperity to the booming community, by the turn of the 20th century the depot was criticized for its appearance, lack of safety, space, and utility.

Northern Pacific constructed the Chehalis historic depot in 1912, located north of the old station. The brick depot is considered Mission Revival architecture and spans nearly a block, situated closely to the railroad tracks. The station is noted for its sectioned façade and gables. The structure once contained a passenger room, telegraph office, and a baggage and freight area. The waiting area was noted for its enameled brick detail and cove ceiling. A portion of the previous station was moved to the new site for use as a freight office. A dedication of the $30,000 train station was held in January 1913.

Most commonly known as the Burlington Northern Depot and in the present-day as the Lewis County Historical Museum, the location went by a variety of names over its lifetime as an operational train station. The Northern Pacific Depot was utilized as one of the first transport hubs in the United States to relocate Japanese-Americans during World War II.

In February 1973, Burlington Northern closed the depot, transferring operations and employees to the Centralia Union Depot. The railroad company initially ordered the historic Chehalis station to be demolished, but after two years of community and political protests hoping to use the depot as a museum, the site was leased to Lewis County in late-1975 for $1 per year. The building was renovated by the Lewis County Historical Society and several volunteers, officially opening as a county historical museum in September 1979.

== Names and monikers ==
The depot has been known under several names and monikers over its lifetime, including early titles such as the Chehalis Depot, Chehalis Train Depot, and the Chehalis Union Depot. The building was often named under the railroad company that operated the station, such as the Northern Pacific Railroad Depot, which was also the moniker of the first official station in the city. Locally the depot was simply referred to as the Chehalis railway station or as the Chehalis railroad depot.

The National Register of Historic Places nomination form refers to the site as the Chehalis Passenger Station and for a brief time after the depot was dedicated as the Lewis County Historical Museum in 1979, was given the moniker, Front Way Depot.

== Background ==
=== First Chehalis railroad stop ===
A Northern Pacific Railway (NPR) bridge was completed at Pumphrey's Landing over the Cowlitz River by the fall of 1872, allowing the construction of a fully connected line between the Columbia River and Puget Sound areas. The portion of the NPR line through Chehalis, then known as Saundersville, was completed shortly thereafter. Land for a Chehalis depot was requested by Northern Pacific, but landowner Eliza Barrett Saunders, known as the matriarch of the city, refused to donate a portion of her claim. Barrett increased the price of the parcel and the company opted for a newly platted site at Newaukum Hill, in the town eventually known as Newaukum. The train tracks between the two communities amounted to a continuous wooden trestle spanning over wetlands though treks for farmers and travelers in the area was still difficult due to the terrain.

Despite the failure to have a depot immediately constructed in the town, Chehalis began earnestly requesting a train station in 1872 with an undaunted approach. A unanimous petition requesting a depot was signed by residents and hand delivered by prominent Chehalis businessmen Lewis A. Davis of Claquato, J.A. Long, (Note: Long's initials are also recorded as "J.H.". He was a senator, representing Chehalis in the state legislature.) and William West to the manager of the NPR line, John W. Sprague, who was residing in Kalama. Though Sprague denied the request, he sent the petition to NPR's headquarters and allowed the returning train to drop off the three representatives in Chehalis rather than in Newaukum.

Two stories exist as to the beginnings of a train stop in Chehalis. A local pioneer, John Alexander of Lintott-Alexander Park, offered a $20 gold coin to a conductor in exchange for a freight delivery directly to Chehalis. A separate story posits that an initiative led by businessmen and residents in the city began flagging down trains with regularity, an option at the time but unknown to the community. The flagging efforts began after a Chehalis man mentioned that trains were required to stop after being flagged. (Note: The name of the man who suggested the flag stop theory remains unknown; the man's name is not mentioned by the committee of Davis, Long, and West, who supposedly heard the stranger speak.) Flaggers were chosen and specifically used red bunting, holding shifts throughout the day to signal the trains to stop. This numerous constancy led to a regular train stop in Saundersville in 1874. In a continuing competition for the rail company's favor with local and regional communities, such as Claquato and South Bend, the city donated land to NPR for a promised railway turntable; the wheelhouse was never built.

Chehalis experienced growth and economic success quickly, recording monthly receipts by October 1885 totaling $2,020 with over 930,000 pounds (420,000 kg) in combined freight activity.

=== First Chehalis station ===
Barrett eventually sold her landholdings near the tracks and Northern Pacific constructed a wood, "regulation depot" in 1890 in a pork processing warehouse. The structure was owned by West and fellow prominent Chehalin, (Note: The term, "Chehalin", is a common nickname for residents in Chehalis.) John Dobson of John Dobson Park. A grain warehouse was built later, using funds gathered from company stock offered at $10 per share. Difficulties over the right-of-way remained into August 1890 as the railroad required several hundred feet of access on both sides of the tracks. Parcels were owned by numerous other people, which included large homes that needed to be moved. Estimates to complete the acquisitions reached as high as $25,000. Union Pacific built an extension of their line to the new station beginning in 1891.

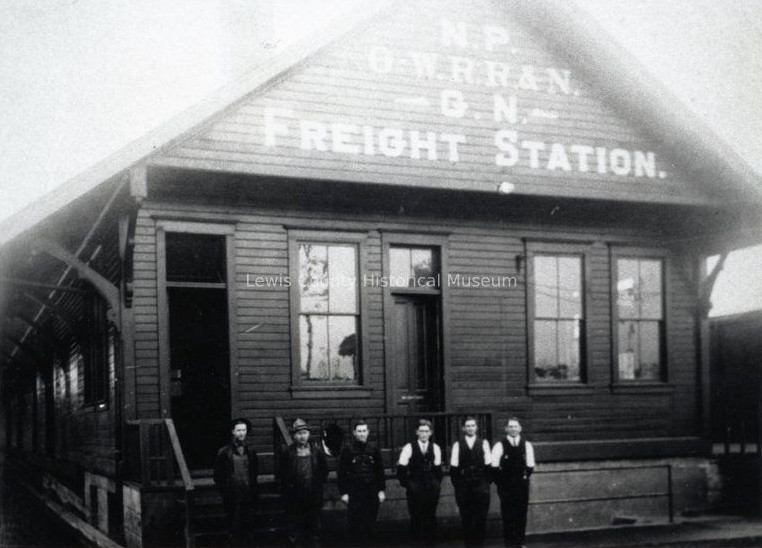
Northern Pacific Freight Station, early 1900s

Northern Pacific proposed the construction of a new station in 1897. The plans called for a 32 ft × 132 ft (9.8 m × 40.2 m) one-story building south of the railroad crossing on Market Street containing an alcove, two waiting rooms, office spaces, and passenger and freight areas. Reports from other Washington communities warned Chehalis residents that the promise was more than likely to fail; despite procurement of materials and laborers, no new depot was built. The station was partially rebuilt beginning in mid-1897, finalized by September.

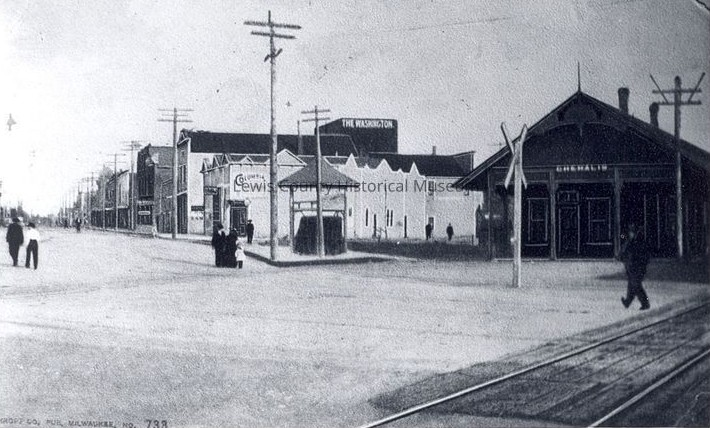
Northern Pacific station and McKinley Stump, ca. 1904

Due to injury concerns, the city attorney in February 1904 declared the train platform a "menace" and demanded the area be tiled. The issue was addressed the following month; the platform was lowered with a 200 foot (61 metres) extension on the south end of the site. The project was expanded to include an enlargement of the building by 50 feet (15.2 m) on the south end, which included a larger baggage area. Additionally, the floors were lowered, as were all doors and windows, and a more convenient bay window ticket booth was installed. The known problem on the platform, which caused repeated falls off the raised area and was known simply as "the ditch", was boxed in. A city-wide paving of streets project begun in late 1907 led to the installation of cement sidewalks at the depot.

The station contained a Western Union telegraph office, a common means of communication of the time. Also common, NPR and Western Union delivered free messages and express mail under the Northern Express Company to the city's residents through means of hand delivery. The practice, considered a "poor one" and often employed a young boy, was meant to keep costs down for residents, though at the expense of a salaried position and deferred costs to residents via gratuity to the delivery person. Due to the advent of a nine-hour workday, railroad financial cutbacks, and the increase in the use of the telephone, the depot's reliance on telegraphy began to wane in 1908, with the station no longer accepting messages transmitted during the evening hours.

The population in Chehalis nearly tripled from 2,300 to 6,500 residents during the original station's lifetime. By 1907, economic success for the town was noted as the depot provided approximately $500,000 in business to Chehalis. The station generated the largest railroad revenue between Portland and Tacoma. However, local residents and officials had long felt the depot was too small, citing a narrow and dangerous platform and freight and passenger rooms much too small.

In 1908, the Chehalis Bee-Nugget newspaper declared the depot a "dump"; another editorial mentioned the location "inadequate" and "too small to accommodate" the growing freight and passenger traffic. A proposal to replace the depot with a brick passenger station was announced in August 1909 by Northern Pacific. Pressure for a new station continued with complaints citing the muddy walkways and water intrusions.

By January 1911, the grounds were in a state of disrepair. A large, "unsightly and unsanitary" mudhole north of the station was stated as "disgraceful", causing locals to use "profane language" while traversing through the business core, covering the district in mud as it was spread. The original depot was lambasted throughout the year in the local press for its appearance and lack of facility, considering it "just as bad" as the station in Centralia. (Note: The 19th century stations in Centralia and Chehalis were known as the "Twin Depots".) The editors of The Centralia Weekly Chronicle wrote on April 28, 1911, that they hoped by a "lucky combination of flames" coupled with a fire department waylaid by an accident, that the train would suffer a final, necessary end. On May 2, the Northern Railroad Depot caught fire. Despite a fire horse that bolted, the crew put out the flames despite the wishes of the local press.

A new station to be constructed by Northern Pacific was announced again in September 1911. A part of the old station was moved on the morning of June 18, 1912 (Note: Later sourcing of the event mentions the move of the original station occurring on September 27, 1912 after the new depot was built.) by flatcar to adjoin the new facilities as a freight room. The rail company continued to use the remaining sections of the old station as part of its stockyard, moving the facility a block south in January 1919. A local Carnation Milk plant began using the location to store fuel. The freight room, being the last remnant of the original depot, was demolished in 1964 under orders from the structure's owner at the time,Chicago, Milwaukee, St. Paul and Pacific Railroad. The 122 foot (37 metres) addition was considered too large to maintain, out of date, and contained amenities, such as bathrooms, that were not needed. A smaller freight office replacement was built across the street.

=== Notable events and incidents ===
The depot welcomed President Benjamin Harrison on May 6, 1891, during a train stop visit in western Washington. Chehalis was his first stop and though cold and raining, a crowd gathered and reportedly "cheered lustily" for the president.

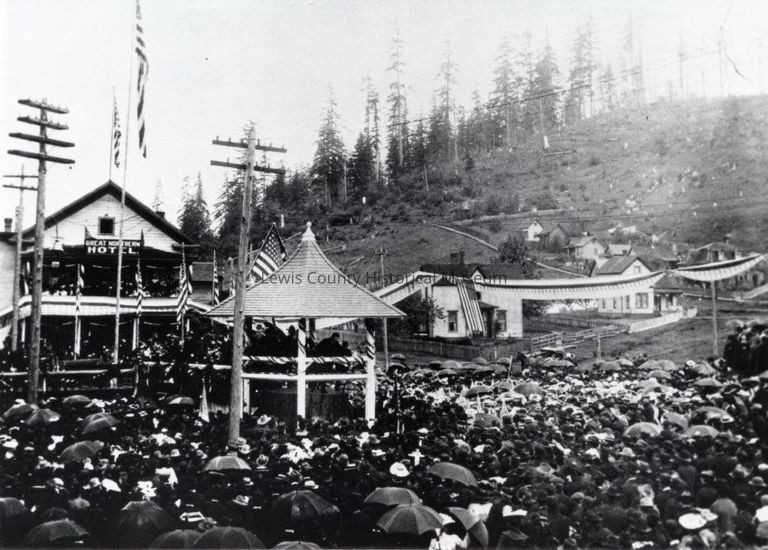
Teddy Roosevelt visit, 1903

On May 22, 1903, approximately 10,000 Chehalins welcomed President Theodore Roosevelt at the depot when he stopped to give a prepared speech upon the McKinley Stump located next to the station. Roosevelt thanked the community, especially for its support during the Spanish-American War, and mentioned that if people in the crowd did not consider themselves expansionists, he wanted to "know what was the matter with you". He expressed gratitude for the region's economy, particularly in agriculture, mining, and timber, and congratulated parents on having a wonderful "crop of children". The 15-minute scheduled speech lasted for 23 minutes despite several reminders to Roosevelt that his speech was running long. The speech included advice to children that when they play, to "play hard" but "when you work, don't play at all". He also had words of admiration for those who employed in hard work and a distaste for those who did not. His parting words were directed towards children from the Washington state reform school, reminding them to "be good".

On August 22, 1903, the depot, after being notified by a messenger, immediately sent flatcars to the site of a train crash 2 miles (3.2 km) south near Newaukum. The crash occurred after a boiler exploded on a Northern Pacific engine that was pulling 7 coaches full of Elks members. A passenger car next to the tender came loose, leaving the tracks and falling down a 30 foot (9.1 metres) embankment, crushing itself against a tree stump. Several passengers were killed and early reports mentioned between 30 and 100 were injured.

During an exterior paint project in October 1909, passengers became irate, using "lurid" language when "lurid" red paint became smeared on clothing. Since no sign was posted stating the paint was still wet, depot visitors who leaned or brushed against the building became covered in the substance. A man, who reportedly cursed vehemently, was told by a worker at the station to simply not rest against the building. (Note: During the red paint debacle of 1909, men were reported to have said, "— — — — railroad company — — ** * **!!")

A fire began in the depot when the telephone switchboard repeatedly sparked during a strong snowstorm in January 1912. The young women managing the system were reported to be in a "continual state of fright" due to the sparks.

Deaths at the station included Claude Wiley, who died after suffering amputations after falling off the snow-covered platform while boarding a train in January 1904.

== Northern Pacific Depot ==
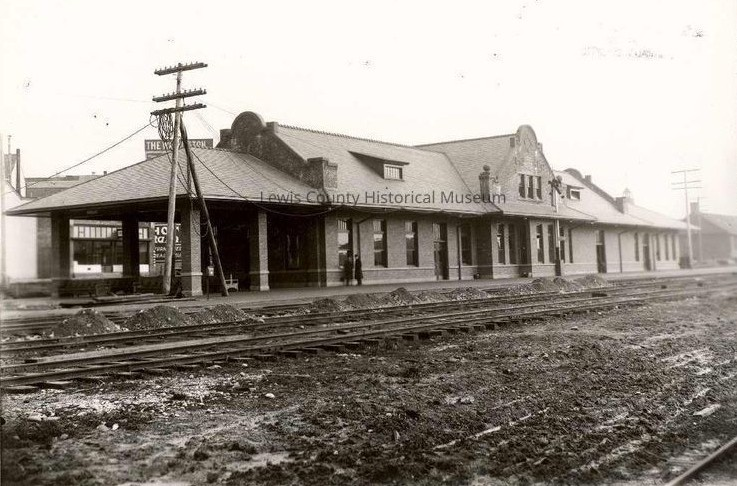
Northern Pacific Depot, c. 1912

In January 1912, Northern Pacific announced official plans to build a new station located immediately south of the old depot. The new facility was to include modern amenities and be of a size appropriate to the growing city. Skepticism by residents, wary of Northern Pacific's intentions, delayed construction, but the railroad company released early plans which showcased a layout that contained a men's smoking room and a "retiring room" for women, as well as various offices for telegraph, ticketing, and trainmen operations. The waiting area was to have a domed ceiling and double settees. Initial concepts regarding materials to be used in the build included brick, concrete, and stone, with a slate roof. The depot was planned to be "fireproof, or nearly so" with passenger waiting areas styled with enameled brick.

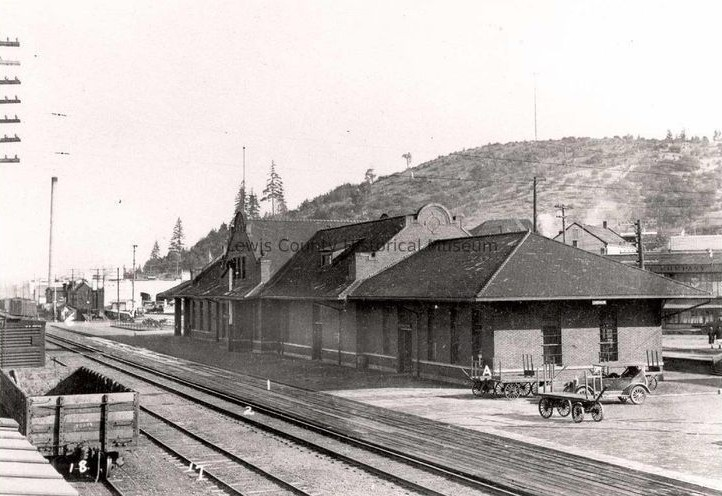
Northern Pacific Depot, north view, 1927

The build of the Northern Pacific Depot was publicly announced on April 4, 1912. An area for a small park was developed at the old depot site and the streets outside the building were to be constructed with brick. After a portion of the old station was relocated to the site in June 1912, construction was deemed to be moving at a rapid pace, with no changes in plan, and in "record time". The depot was completed in the late summer of 1912 with finished carpentry details in September; the pour of a concrete platform was also completed. The freight and telegraph offices were moved from the old station during the final phase of construction. The final cost of the Chehalis depot was reported as $30,000.

An official dedication ceremony was held on January 23, 1913. Hosted by William West, a banquet crowd of 200 people were joined by several prominent railroad officials. The structure was immediately of use to other rail companies. By 1914, the station and rail tracks accommodated a weekly average of 17 freight and 44 passenger trains. An early taxi service by buggy led from the depot to the Hotel Savoy, known previously as the Tynan Opera House built and owned by Eliza Barrett.

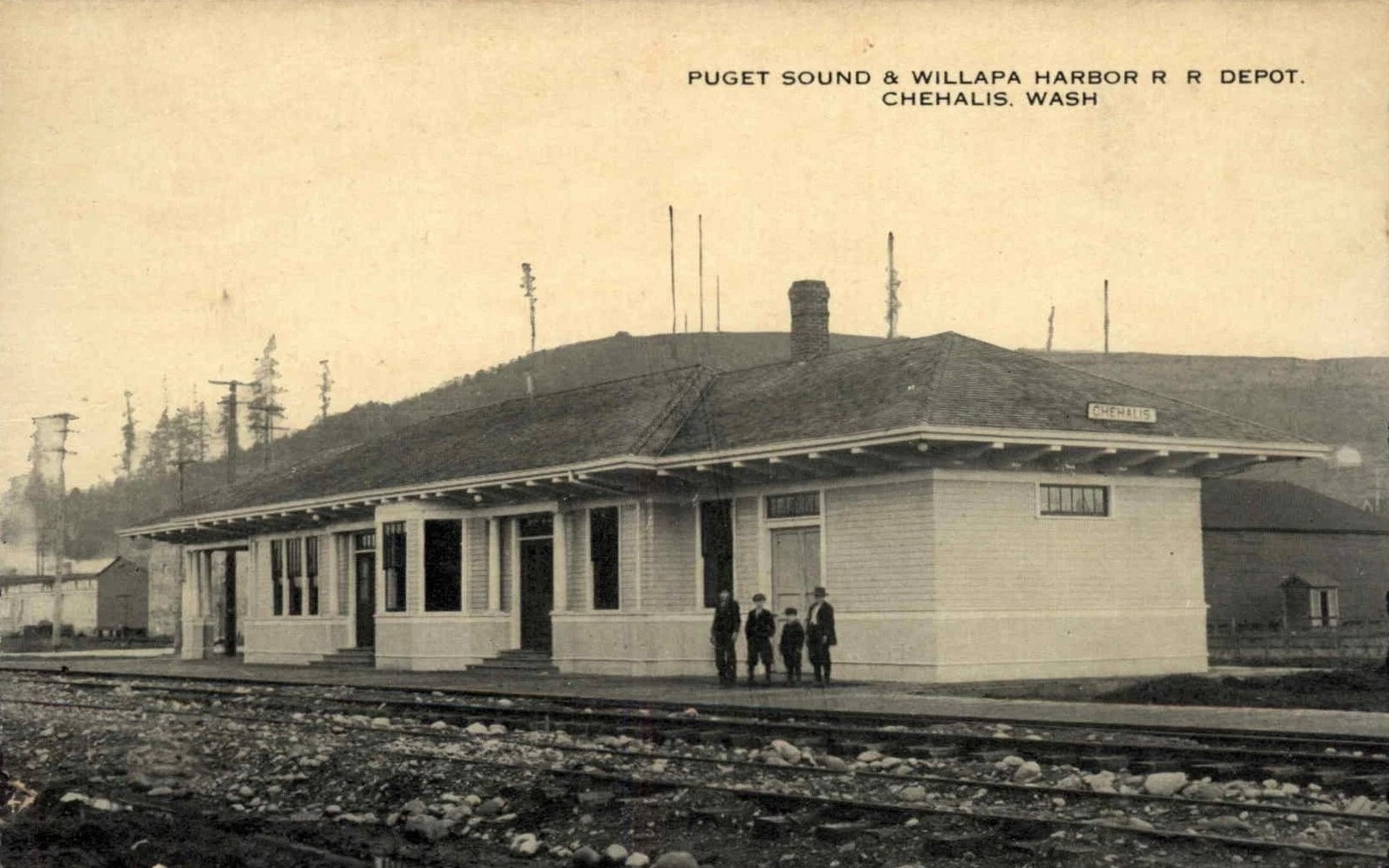
Puget Sound & Willapa Harbor Railway Company Depot, ca. 1914

A competing depot under the Puget Sound & Willapa Harbor Railway Company (PSWHR) was announced in June 1914. The new station was to be situated nearly across the Northern Pacific Depot between Gertrude and West Streets on State Avenue. Proposed to contain separate stations for freight and passengers, the passenger depot was to be styled in Bungalow architecture, matching a PSWHR station that was concurrently planned in Centralia.

While the depot was operational, the station was utilized by several prominent railroad companies. Railway corporations included the structure's original builder, Northern Pacific, as well as Great Northern Railway, which leased space at the depot for a time. Other companies with operations at the depot were Oregon-Washington Railroad & Navigation Company and Union Pacific Railroad, which provided Chehalis and surrounding agriculture and timber economies access to its connections to San Francisco.

=== Renovations ===
In order to make the heating system of the depot more efficient, steam pipes were insulated in 30 in (76 cm) drain tile under the freight section in 1925. A general remodeling, mostly involving "rekalsomined" painting of the interior as well as some exterior details such as benches, took place in 1930.

=== Notable events and incidents ===
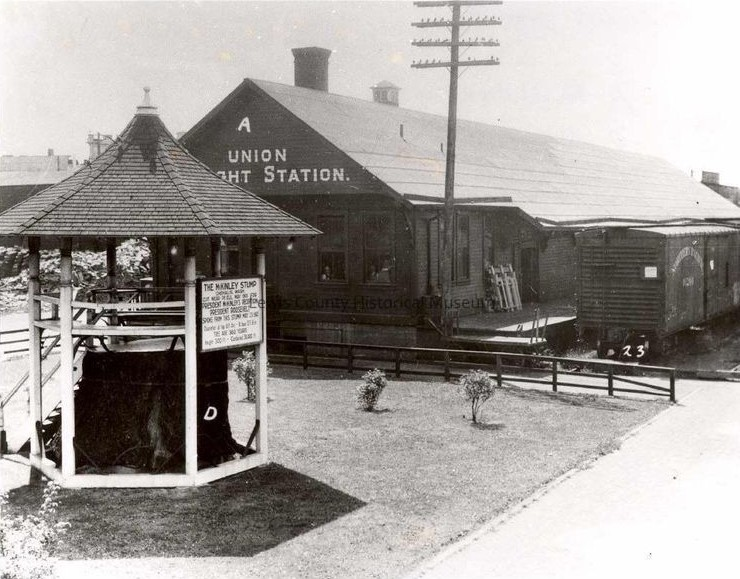
Union Pacific Freight Office and McKinley Stump, 1929

A small fire in August 1914 occurred in the late evening hours and was spotted by a passerby. Though the structure was filled with smoke, minimal damage was reported. A cigar, discarded in a sawdust pile, was found to be the source. For a second time, Teddy Roosevelt stopped briefly in Chehalis at the depot on July 19, 1915, greeted by a small group of people during an unpublicized trip.

After a chase, a San Francisco-bound train carrying narcotics was stopped at the depot in July 1924. Federal officials confiscated 1,000 5-tael tins worth over $85,000 that were smuggled in from an overseas steamship. A ten-year employee, Hobart Fiscus, was arrested in January 1928 after an investigation by federal postal inspectors found Fiscus was "pilfering" mail at the depot for several months. The night clerk, considered by his friends as a man of "excellent reputation", pled guilty in March, serving six months in jail.

After complaints from residents during 1937 about excessive train whistles usually in the morning hours, the Chehalis commissioner board petitioned the city's attorney to request that Northern Pacific "curtail" the noise, specifically towards intercontinental trains passing through the community. A fire that destroyed several buildings in the railroad district occurred in the morning hours of July 26, 1939. A shift in the wind spared the depot which reportedly suffered only minor damage.

The depot was used to transport Japanese-Americans, including 64% who were United States citizens, on June 2, 1942, during the beginning efforts of the internment of Japanese Americans during World War II; the group was one of the first in the nation to be transported. The 86 individuals of Japanese heritage, which included children, were from Lewis and Pacific County, including the communities of Adna and Onalaska. The group, given yellow Army identification tags that were numbered, boarded a train to Tule Lake War Relocation Center in California.

After the station's closure, the depot was briefly of use as such again on June 1, 1975, due to a freight train derailment south of Vader that blocked the Amtrak right-of-way into the Puget Sound region. Passengers were bussed around the accident site to the Chehalis station, boarding a replacement Amtrak passenger train on a continuing trip into Seattle.

=== Closure and planned demolition ===
Operational throughout its run as a freight and passenger depot, early signs of its demise began in the late 1960s. The Western Union telegraph office, part of the station since its beginnings, closed in January 1969. In March 1970, a large merger of several railroad companies led to the creation of Burlington Northern (BNR). The new company, due to "economic reasons", began closing depots and stations in smaller communities. Initial attempts were made to create a combined terminal between the Twin Cities, which would have included the build of an industrial park for the Chehalis–Centralia Airport in the railroad district.

After an announcement in early 1972, passengers were permanently diverted from Chehalis to Centralia. The Chehalis station had begun to merged their operations and employees with Centralia beginning in January 1973. The Chehalis Depot was officially closed on February 15, 1973, with plans for demolition under orders from Burlington Northern. In the event that the station was demolished, an early plan was to convert the parcel into a parking lot.

Vacant in the interim, various groups in Chehalis attempted to save the depot. Interest in acquiring the depot was undertaken by the Chehalis Parking Improvement Club which, at the time, leased spaces in two parking lots adjacent to the station. By March 1974, the station was added to the Washington State Heritage Register and beginning offers were made to purchase the site by Lewis County. A letter from Burlington Northern's corporate headquarters was hand delivered in May 1974 to the county commissioner board by a company vice-president stating the railroad's intent to demolish the structure within a month. The statement deemed the structure to be too close to the rail lines and because it was made of brick, considered impossible to relocate. No appeal was to be accepted.

Continuing efforts by several organizations and people, which included Senators Henry M. Jackson and Warren Magnuson as well as Representative Julia Butler Hansen, plans to demolish the depot were postponed in August 1974. However, citing the same concerns of safety and difficulty in moving the building, Burlington Northern announced in May 1975 that the razing of the historic depot was to commence once again.

=== Demolition cancelled ===
A petition to save the station was undertaken by a city-wide canvass led by the Committee of Concerned Citizens for the Preservation of the Depot. The appeal was signed by over 1,000 people. The efforts were considered an important step that helped the station be added to both the Washington State Heritage Register and the National Register of Historic Places in 1974. However, Burlington Northern restated their concerns over safety as the depot was deteriorating. The company also voiced their concerns over the potential dangers if additional visitors came to facility, with dozens of trains passing by daily.

Due in part to various political actions plans to demolish the depot were postponed into the summer of 1975 with the site beginning to be finalized for its use to the city and the Lewis County Historical Society. Plans were continually waylaid under various concerns, including financial solvency, Burlington Northern's liability, and the county's requirement that the building was to be of use only as a museum.

Burlington Northern officially announced on July 11, 1975, that the historic station would not be demolished. An interim agreement was reached that Lewis County could purchase the depot, assuming the county fulfilled promises to undertake safety and improvement concerns the railroad company had stated over the previous years. Failure to do so would have allowed Burlington Northern to retake possession of the site. The deal was still tenuous until September 29, when the railroad company agreed to lease the building to the county. Burlington Northern specified requirements that it be used only as a museum and that the county must erect a fence between the railroad tracks and the platform. The original lease, signed on November 3, 1975, and spanning for 20 years, could not be cancelled and required a $1 payment annually; afterwards, the lease could be renewed annually in perpetuity and cancelled only if the county no longer wanted the building under their oversight. (Note: The 1975 lease agreement did not cover the adjoining parking lots.)

== Lewis County Historical Society and Museum ==
The Lewis County Historical Society and Museum (LCHS), originally incorporated in 1965 and was located at the Cory House in the city's Hillside Historic District since it opened in November 1968. The society, wanting to expand due to the cramped nature and poor location of the Cory House, began to research the historical importance of the depot. Despite railroad officials lacking confidence that a museum could work, as well as deeming the depot unsafe as use for a museum due to its immediate proximity to the tracks, the LCHS pushed forward, reaching out and involving Burlington Northern, the Chehalis community, and local businesses.

=== Restoration ===
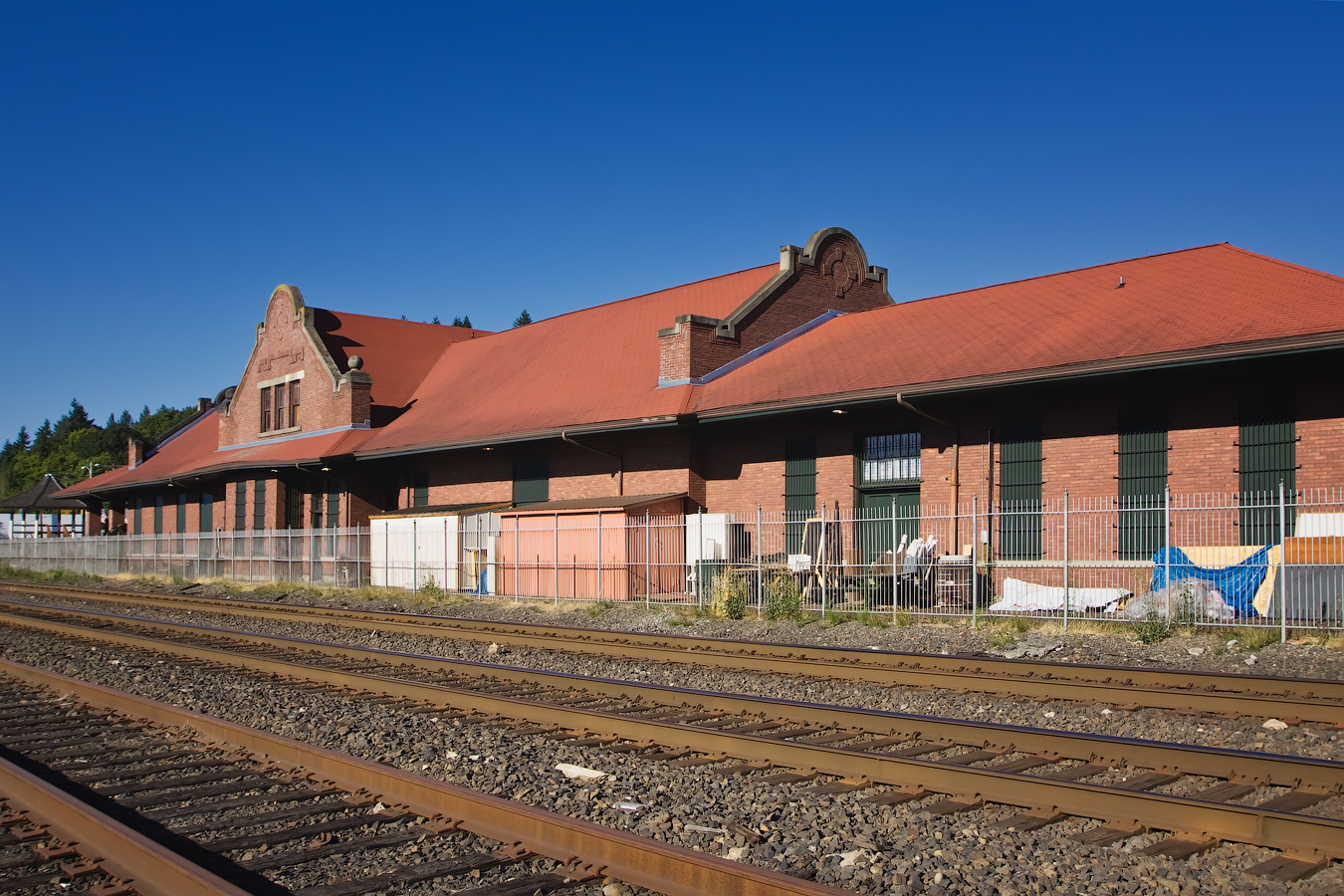
View from railroad tracks, 2011

The Chehalis Depot had been vacant since 1973 and atrophy of the structure was substantial. The city council approved a renovation plan by LCHS member and University of Washington student, Cynthia Elise Botch, (Note: Cynthia Elise Botch was studying interior architecture, choosing the Chehalis depot as a class project. A member of the LCHS, Minnie Lingreen, suggested the idea to Botch.) in July 1975, leading to almost $115,000 in grants and funding from various parties. Participating agencies and organizations included the Comprehensive Employee Training Act (CETA), the Economic Development Administration (EDA), and the LCHS which used $13,000 of its own funds that were marked for upgrades to the station's electrical and plumbing systems. A Lewis County Public Works director of the county's building department, Dennis Sabin, volunteered to remodel parts of the depot at no taxpayer expense.

As the initial restoration did not include renovating the interior, a pledge drive began in July 1977 to raise $50,000 for such needs as a new heating system and display cases. Students at Green Hill School manufactured and erected a wrought iron fence. With less than two weeks left to raise the money, the drive had raised only $10,000; the low amount was considered to be due to the confusion over the various methods of funding being sought. With a late push, but ultimately falling short, the goal was finally achieved after interest on the deposited funds were added.

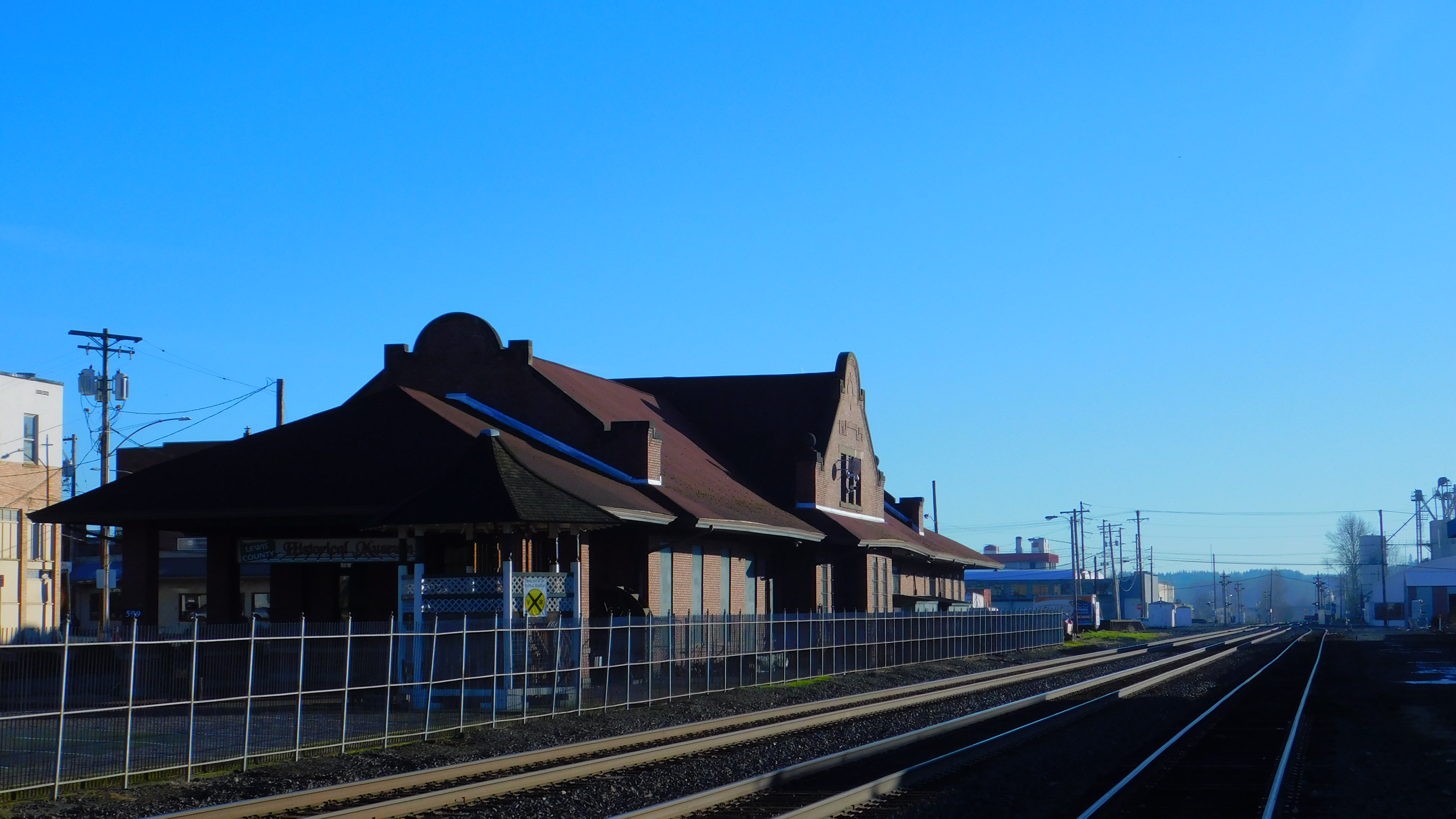
Lewis County Historical Museum, 2022

Into 1977, the efforts were overseen by Botch and included additional work such as the system installations for security and temperature control; by June, work to reconfigure the interior footprint to better suit a museum layout was still under process. Landscaping, replacing walkways, "rejuvenating" the brick façade and the construction of displays were additional parts of the overall remodel. The roof was replaced by the same month, the labor undertaken by the CETA who also contributed to several other efforts within the facility. In combination with the slow or delayed releases of funds that prevented the completion of several exterior needs, including repairs to the platform and soffits, the opening of the museum was ultimately pushed past several promised dates, such as a planned United States Bicentennial celebration in 1976. A retaining wall on Front Street, which was higher in elevation than the depot, was built of sheet metal and planted with ivy beginning in October 1977.

Although most costs were considered to be covered by donations of Chehalins and Lewis county residents, additional monies were made available for the restoration via a combination of several county, state, and federal programs. Funds did not cover all the anticipated renovations, requiring a scale of work to be smaller in scope. The monetary constraints did not allow the LCHS to purchase the historic Doty Bridge in 1976, which was under threat of demolition.

=== Opening and dedication ===
The former Northern Pacific Depot was officially renamed as the Lewis County Historical Society and Museum, with the organization granted rights to the facility under a $1 per year lease signed in 1975.

An early dedication was held on October 7, 1978 but Lewis County did not declare the renovations as complete until December 27, 1978. The museum celebrated its grand reopening on September 18, 1979.

== Geography ==
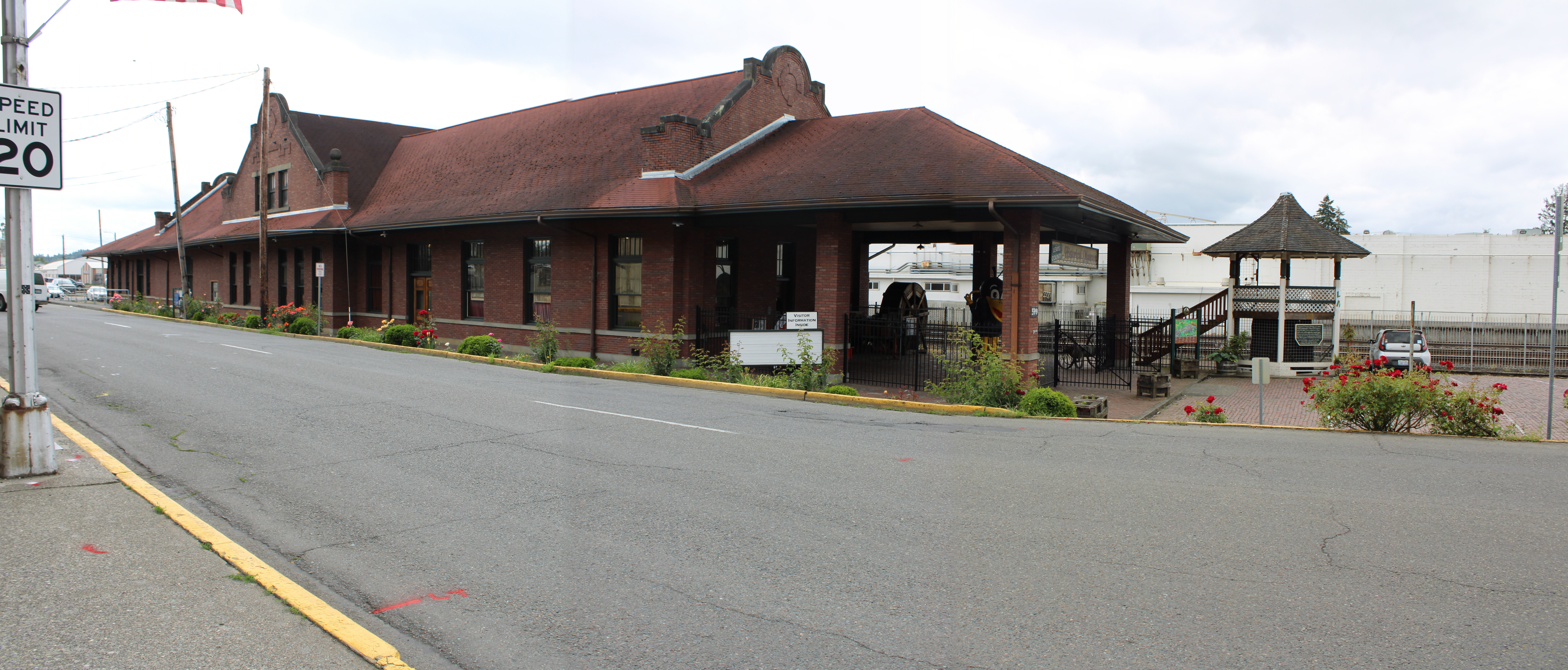
Panorama, 2024

The depot is situated at the northwest end of the National Register of Historic Places-listed Chehalis Downtown Historic District at the intersection of West Street and Front Street. The building's footprint spans to the Front Street intersection with Pacific Avenue. (Note: The NRHP nomination form lists the address vaguely as, "off U.S. 99/WA 1".) Immediately to the west is the city's Pennsylvania Avenue-West Side Historic District, a listed district on the NRHP.

The Burlington Northern station, along with the NRHP-listed Centralia Union Depot, served as a halfway point between the Columbia River and Puget Sound.

== Operations and ownership ==
At the time of the NRHP nomination, the building was considered privately owned by Burlington Northern though in the process of "public acquisition". By 1999, Burlington Northern was offering to sell the building for approximately $200,000, but the society did not have funds to purchase the depot at the time.

The depot and museum building, as of 2026, is owned by Lewis County and maintenance falls under their jurisdiction; the county does not charge the LCHS rent for use of the facility.

Joint Great Northern/Northern Pacific/ Union Pacific service
Preceding station	Great Northern Railway	Following station
Napavine toward Portland	Portland–Seattle Line	Centralia toward Seattle
Preceding station	Northern Pacific Railway	Following station
Napavine toward Portland	Portland–Seattle Line	Centralia toward Seattle
Preceding station	Union Pacific Railroad	Following station
Napavine toward Portland	Portland–Seattle Line	Centralia toward Seattle

== Architecture and site features ==
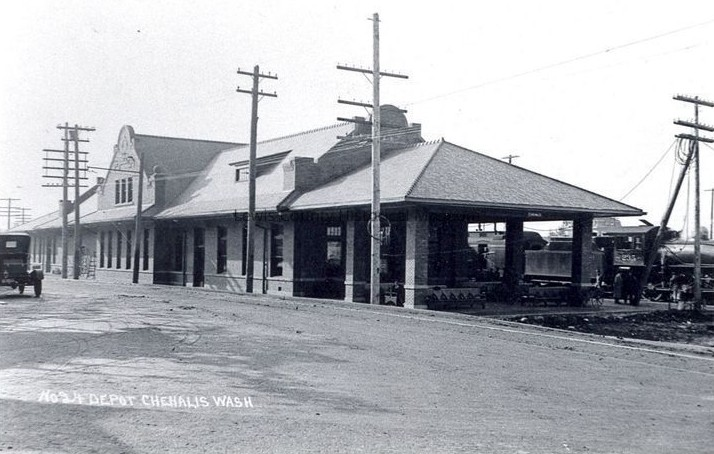
Northern Pacific Depot, main entrance, 1912

Unless otherwise noted, the details provided are based on the 1974 National Register of Historic Places (NRHP) nomination form and may not reflect updates or changes to the Northern Pacific Depot/Lewis County Historical Museum in the interim.

The depot is a one-story, rectangular building measuring approximately 45 ft × 160 ft (14 m × 49 m). The station is situated parallel to the railroad tracks and is nearly one block long. The building is described in several different styles, but most predominately as Mission Revival architecture.

=== Exterior ===
Although a continuous structure, the depot is constructed in a manner that visually separates the building into five sections. The medium-pitched roof contains parapet gables in the second through fourth sections. The sloped, capped gables contain a semi-circular protrusion as well as corbels and decorative brickwork. The middle section is a cross gable roof and is the building's center peak, standing slightly above the adjoining sections. The main roof contains a slight bellcast at the eaves. This overhang and cornice detail continues uninterrupted around the entirety of the depot, insetting or expanding as the plane of the exterior walls change from section to section, creating a consistent soffit width. At the 100th anniversary of the building in 2012, sections of the tiled roof were noted to still remain in its original form.

The bookended sections contain a shallower, three-quarter hip roof and rest slightly below the parapet gables. The north end section is a covered porch, once the main entrance to the original waiting room. Six posts, of which two are attached to the building, are split three to a side and support the porch roof. At the time of the NRHP nomination, stenciled warnings were added to each side of all posts, declaring, "DO NOT SPIT".

The south end, the location of the freight office, is enclosed and inset to the fourth section which was the original baggage handling area. The walls of the third section extend several feet out from the attached waiting and baggage sections, and contains a rectangular bay window. Long, vertical windows, originally for use of railroad personnel to observe approaching trains, provide views of the tracks from the second and fourth sections.

The central area once contained the railroad office and a telegraph room. The layout of the building was efficient, requiring minimum use of connecting hallways and seamless transitions for passengers from the waiting room to the baggage area.

The walls contain a continuous course of stone above a beginning stone base layer. The stone course is interrupted only by doorways and the windows rest upon its top course. Double-door entrances are located at the freight and baggage area and contained multi-pane transom windows. Three doors provide access to the waiting room, one located under the covered porch and two side entrances opposite each other on the east and west walls. Windows, usually double-hung with multi-pane transoms, are set in a consistent manner with exceptions at the baggage area.

Exterior architectural features

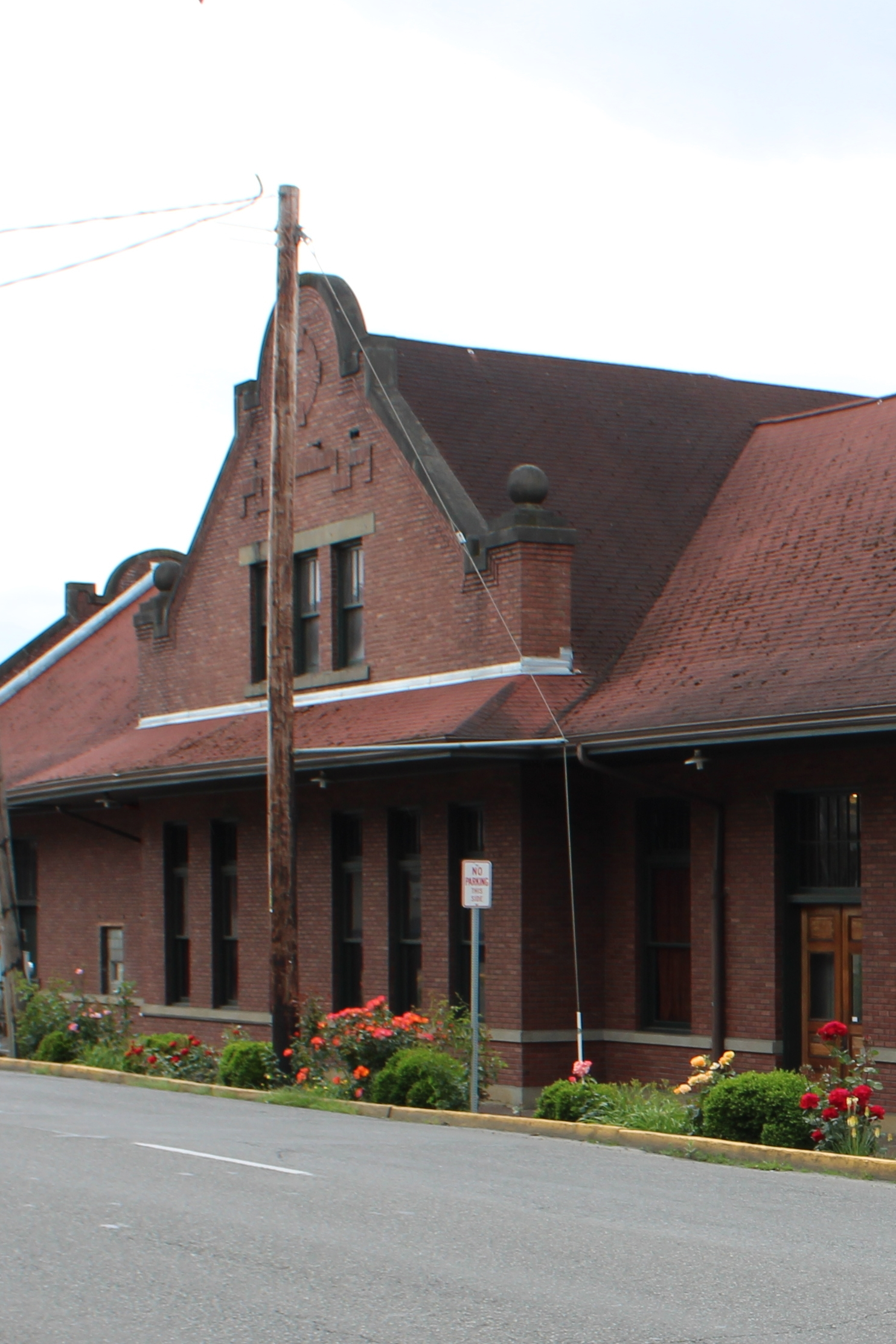
Center cross gable, 2024

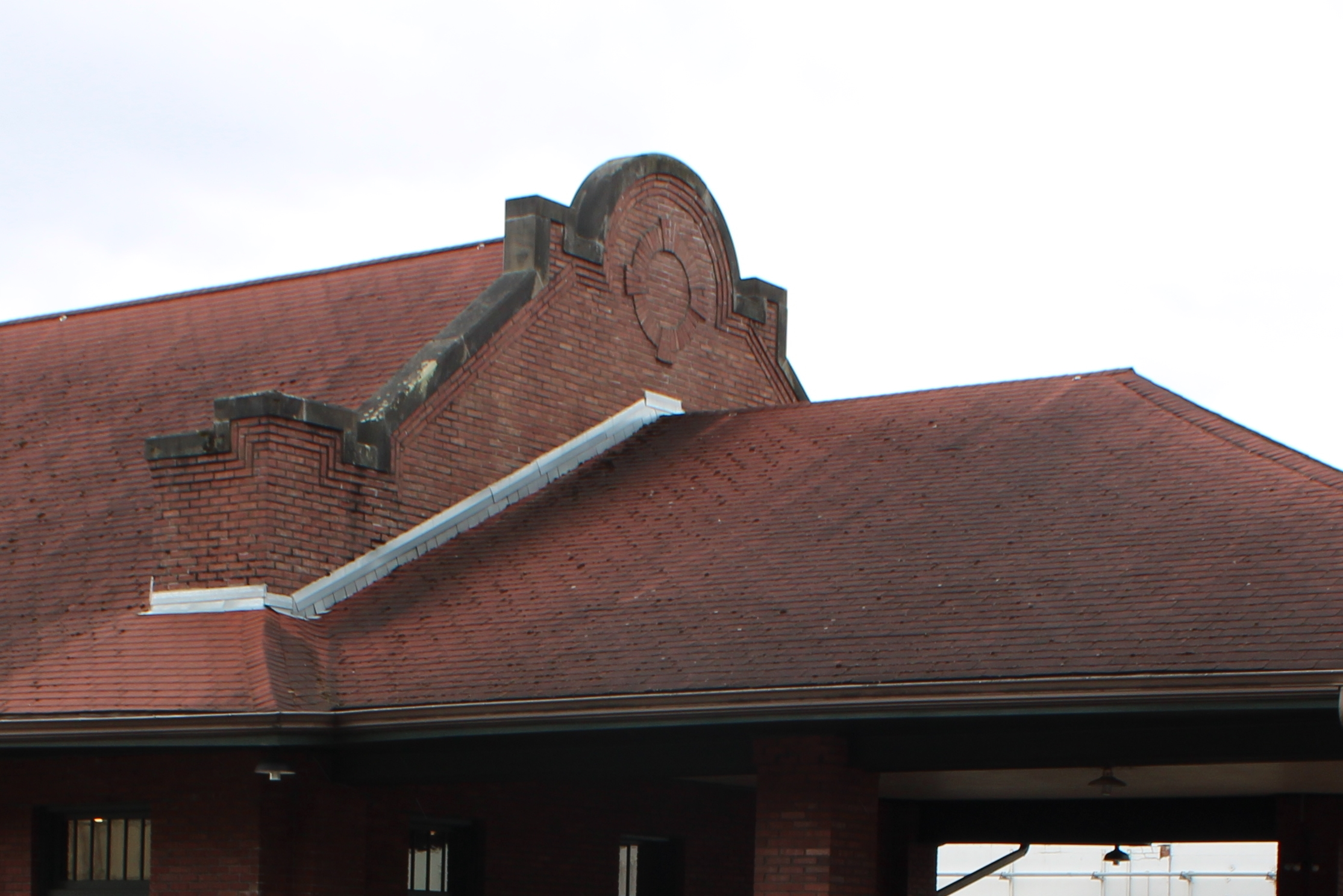
End gable over main entrance, 2024

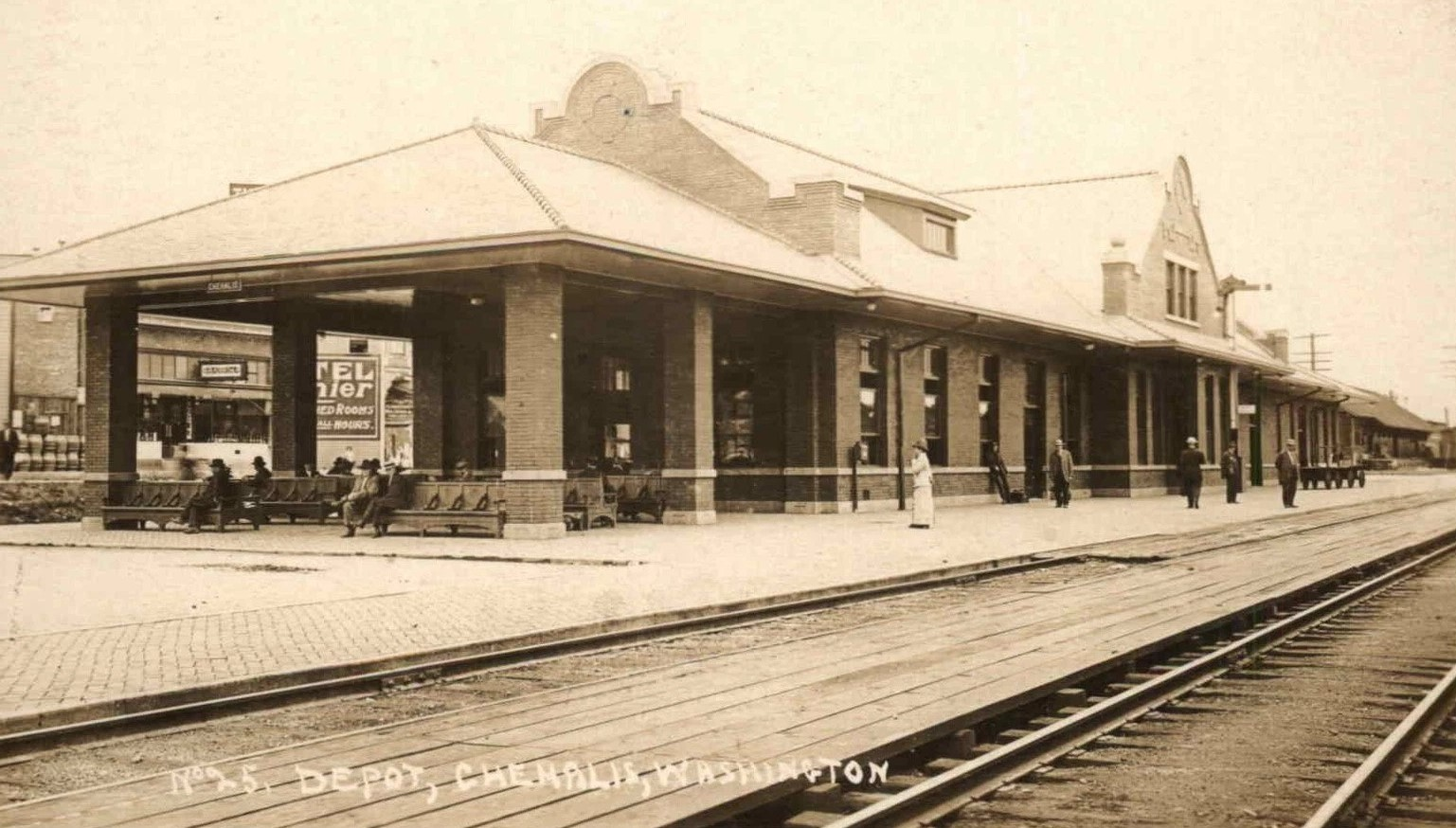
Outdoor seating, ca. 1920s

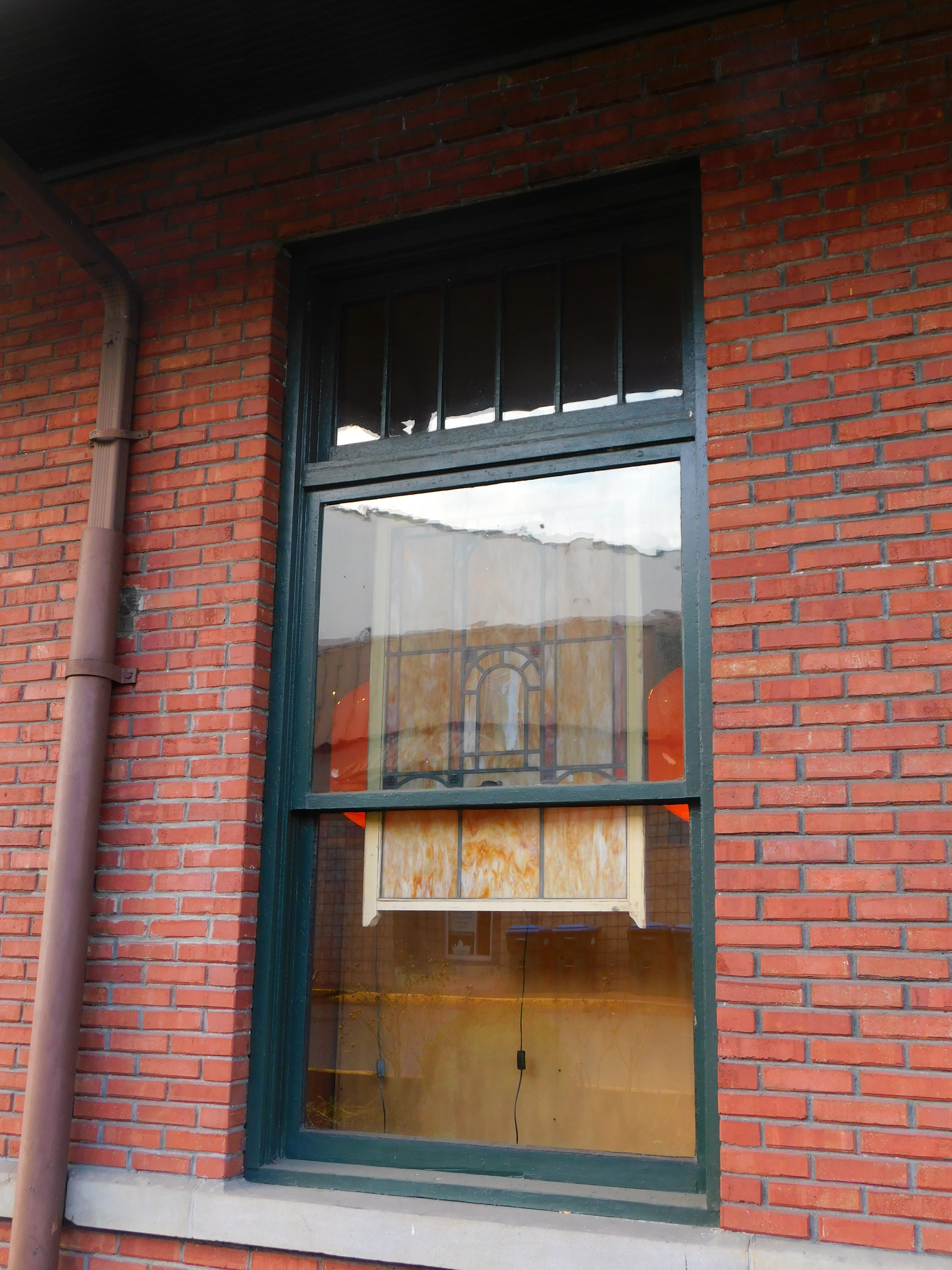
Window detail, 2025

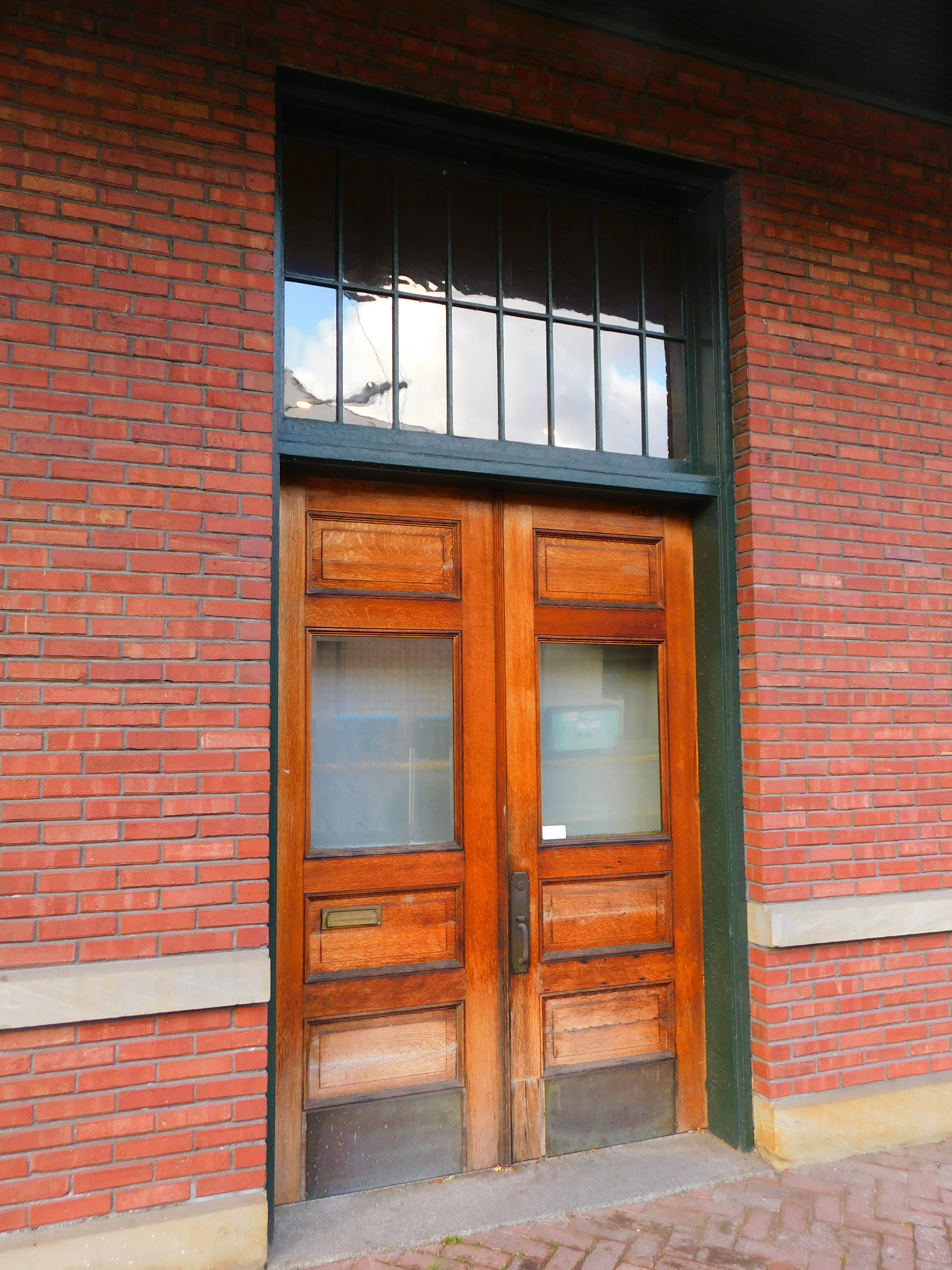
Side door to passenger room, 2025

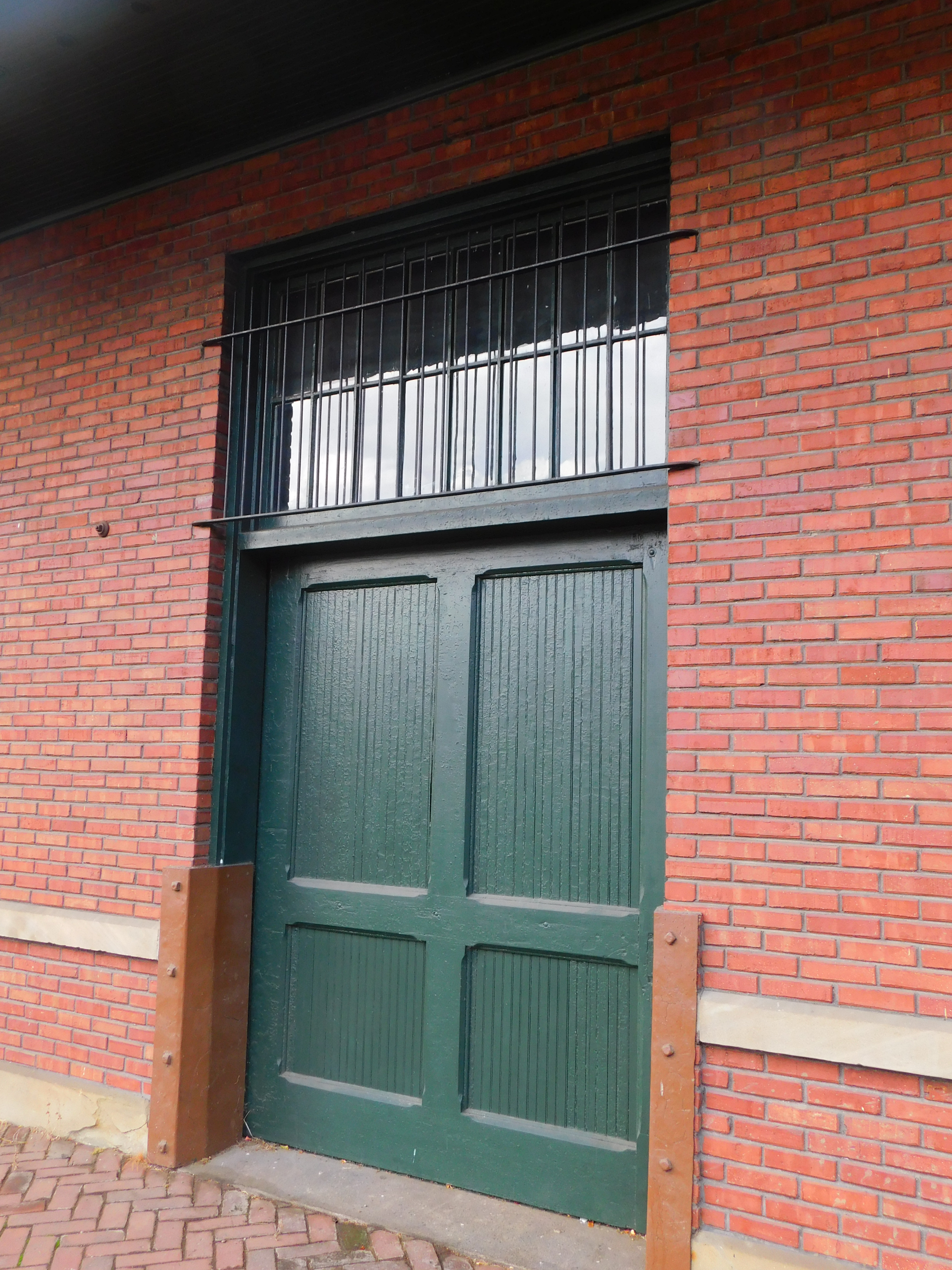
Freight room door, 2025

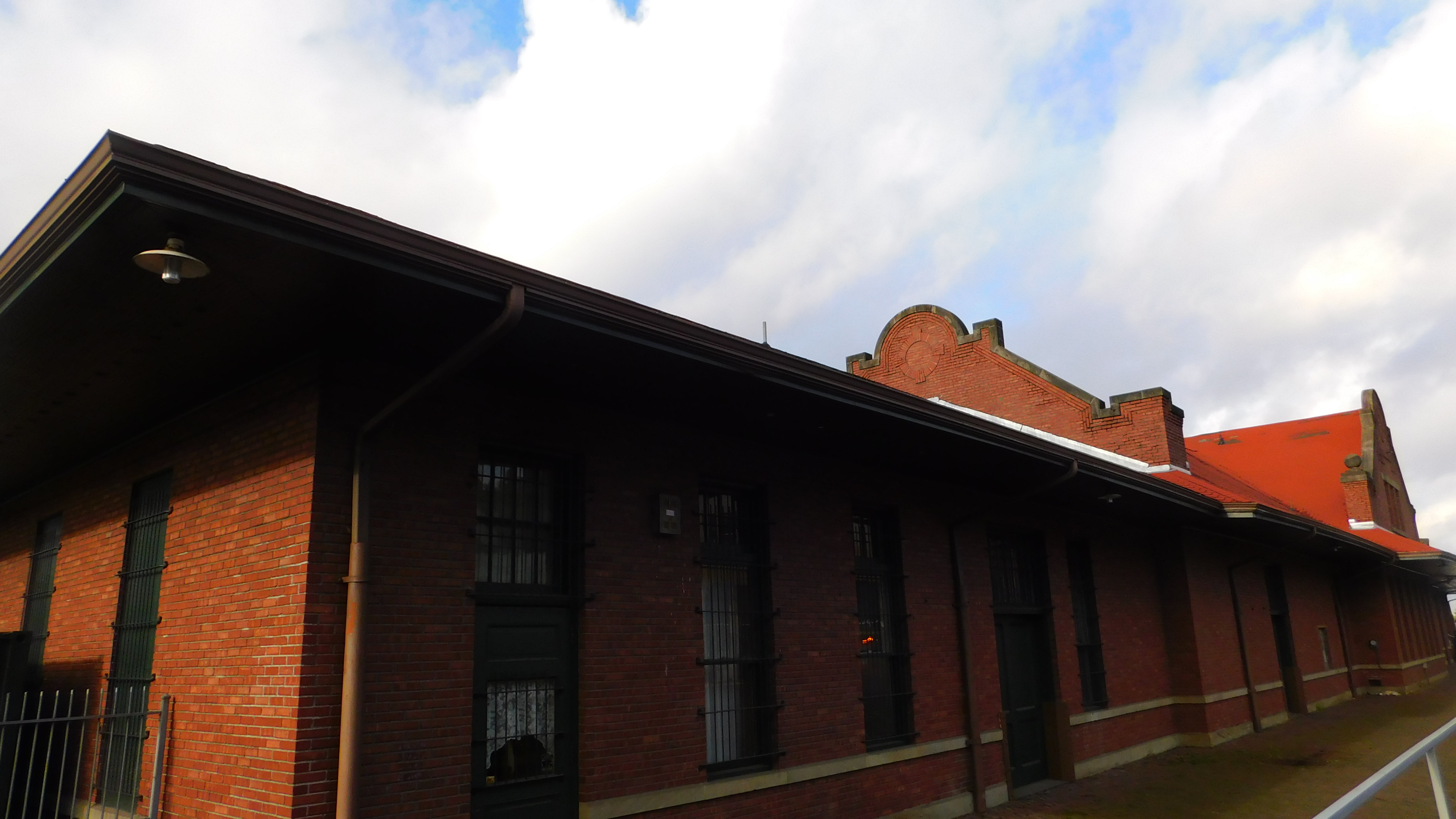
View from freight room, 2025

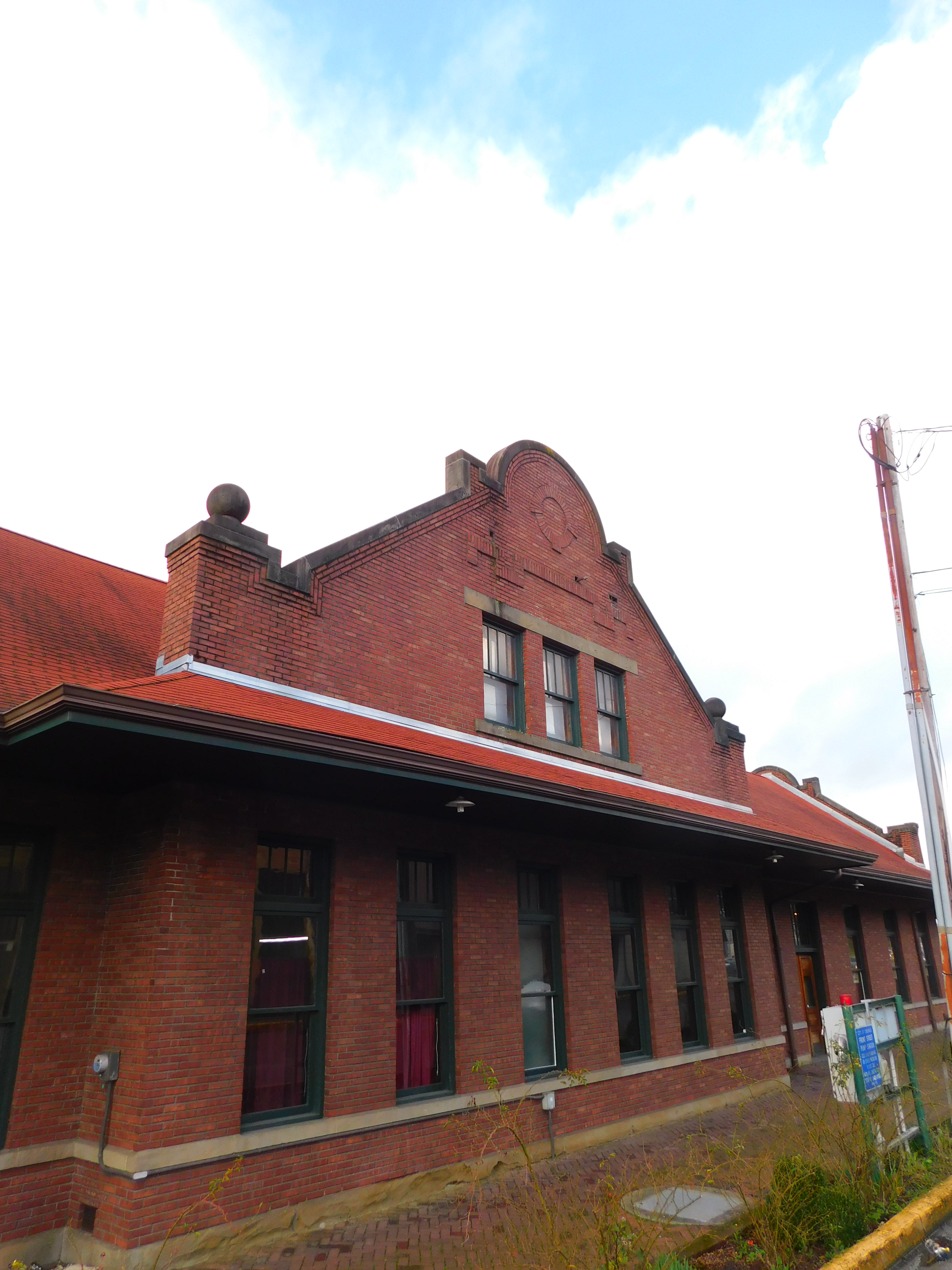
Cross gable at center peak, 2025

=== Interior ===
The waiting room off the covered porch section is noted for a cove ceiling with an "unusually large radius". The walls contain Neoclassical architecture pilasters that become ribs that equally converge across the ceiling. At the time of the NRHP nomination, the chest-high wainscotting was white-glazed and the floor was terrazzo. The passenger room, converted along with other parts of the floor as a display area for the museum, is approximately 4,600 square feet (430 m^{2}) in size.

Interior features

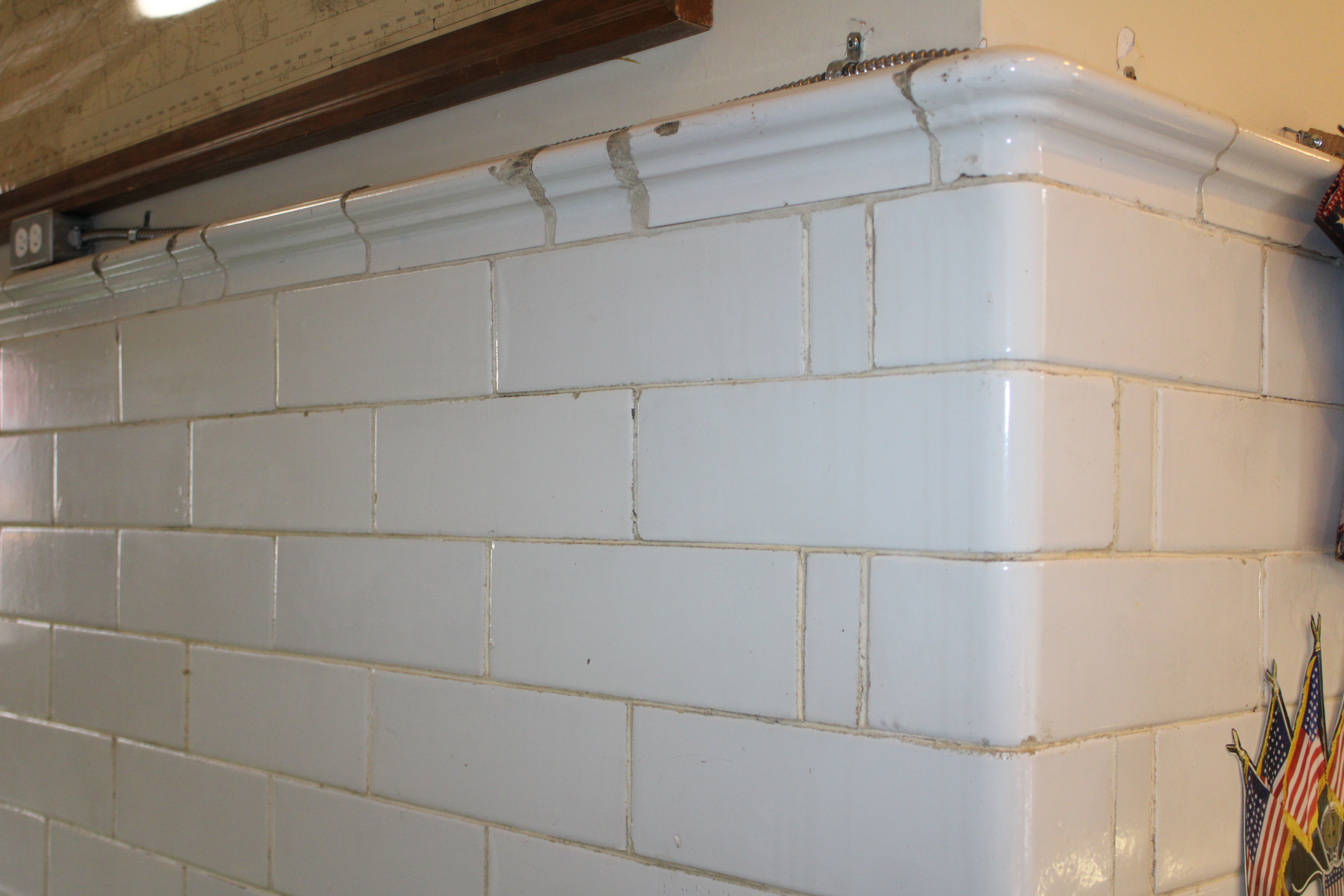
Ceramic tile interior walls, 2024

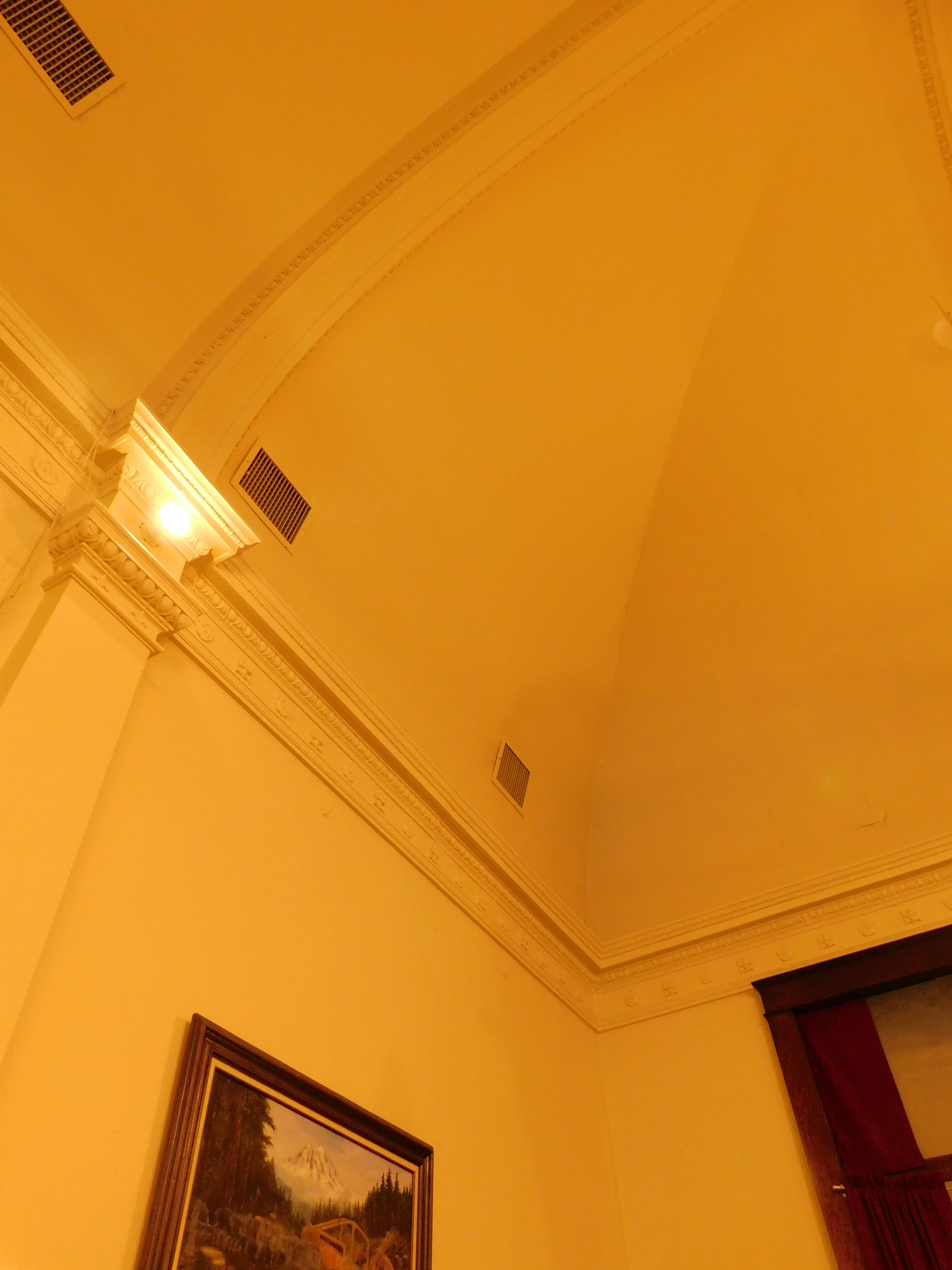
Ceiling detail passenger waiting room, 2025

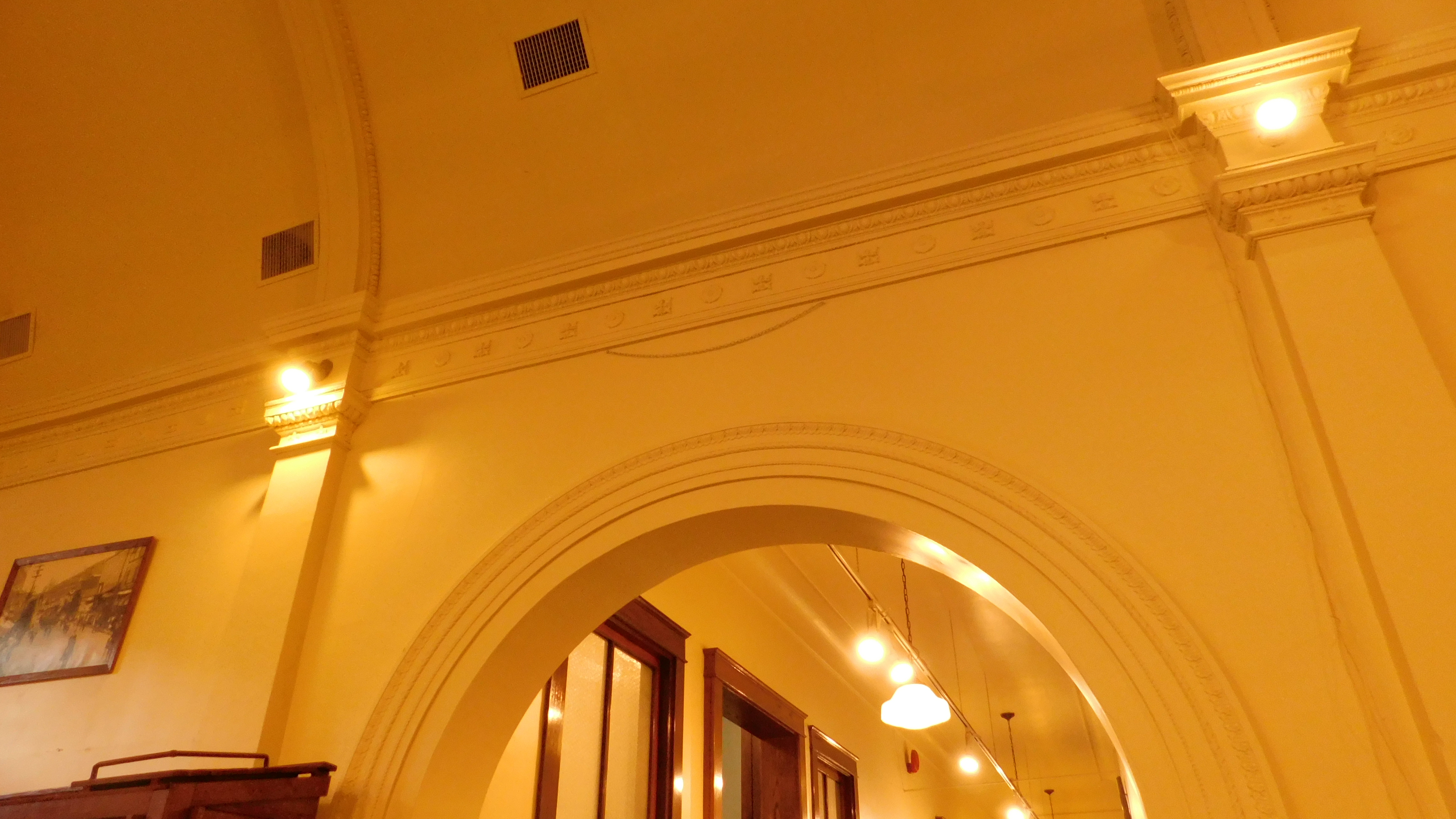
Doorway arch detail, 2025

=== Extinct features ===
The station once contained a public telephone booth, installed before February 1922. Two grass lawn areas were located immediate to the north and south entrances of the station after the 1912 construction.

== Significance ==
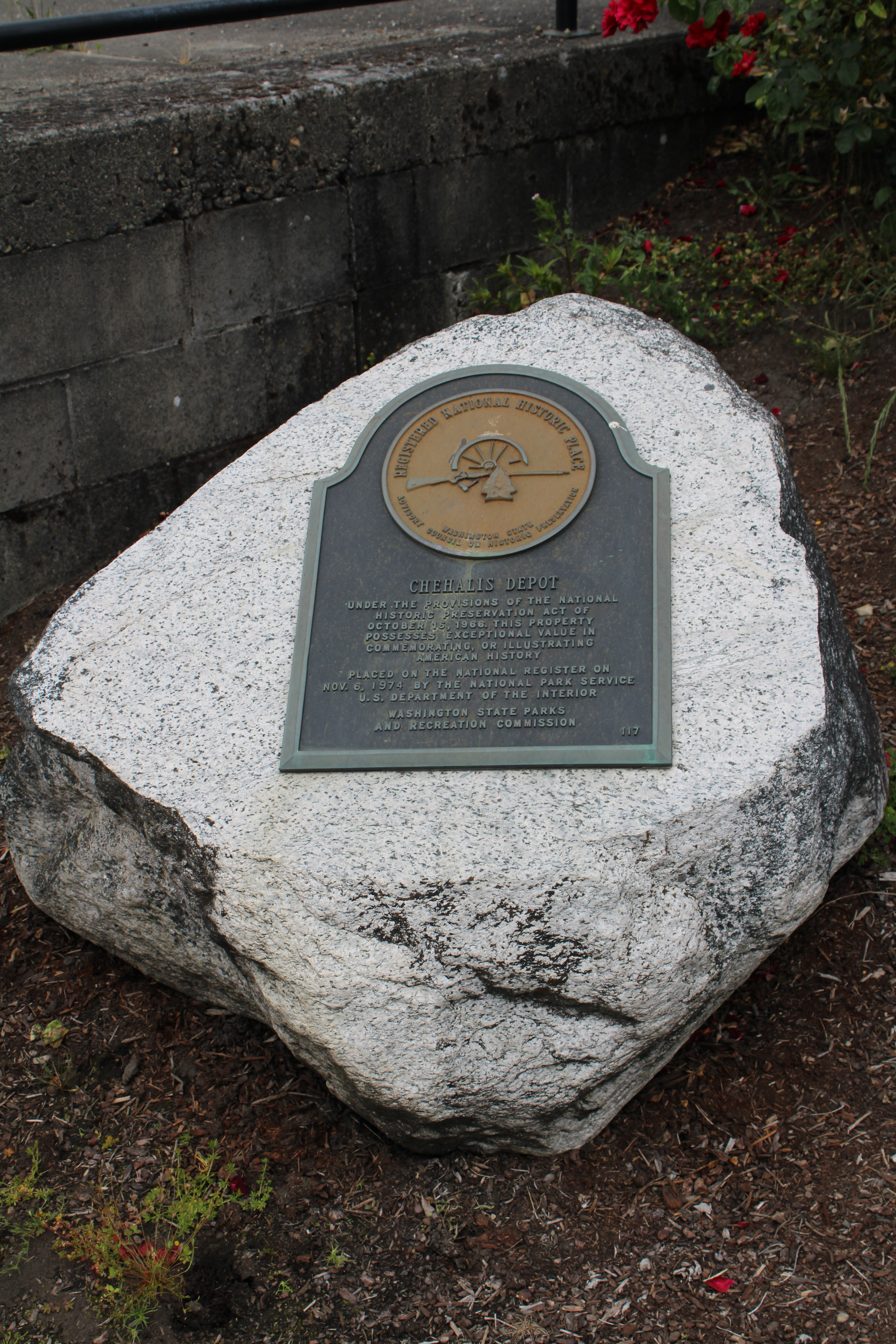
NRHP plaque, 2024

Prior to the National Register of Historic Places (NRHP) listing, the station was added to the Washington State Heritage Register on March 8, 1974. The depot was added to the NRHP on November 6, 1974. (Note: Sourcing since 1974 has mentioned differing dates for the NRHP acceptance, including December 29, 1974.) The NRHP nomination declared the station to be in "good condition" and in a mostly unaltered state. The depot was considered a "distinctive historical asset" and noted as a focal point in the city's business district.

Architecturally, the depot's design and style was recognized as a "good example" of the standard for train stations in medium-sized cities such as Chehalis in the early 20th century. The NRHP form also noted the connection of Theodore Roosevelt's visit to the city and the McKinley Stump.

After the depot was built in 1912, the Chehalis Bee-Nugget newspaper wrote that the first station in 1890 was borne out of the community's pride and flag stop efforts in the 1870s, declaring the moment as "typical" of the Chehalis spirit and a show of the town's character. The overall work was considered crucial to the 1912 historic station, deeming the excitement over the new structure and its usefulness to the community to be deserved.

A documentary, focusing on both Twin City depots at their respective 100th anniversaries, was filmed by KBTC-TV in 2012. Since 2019, the building has been hosting a live camera feed of the train tracks behind the building.
