= Newaukum, Washington =

Unincorporated community in Lewis County, Washington

- Unincorporated community
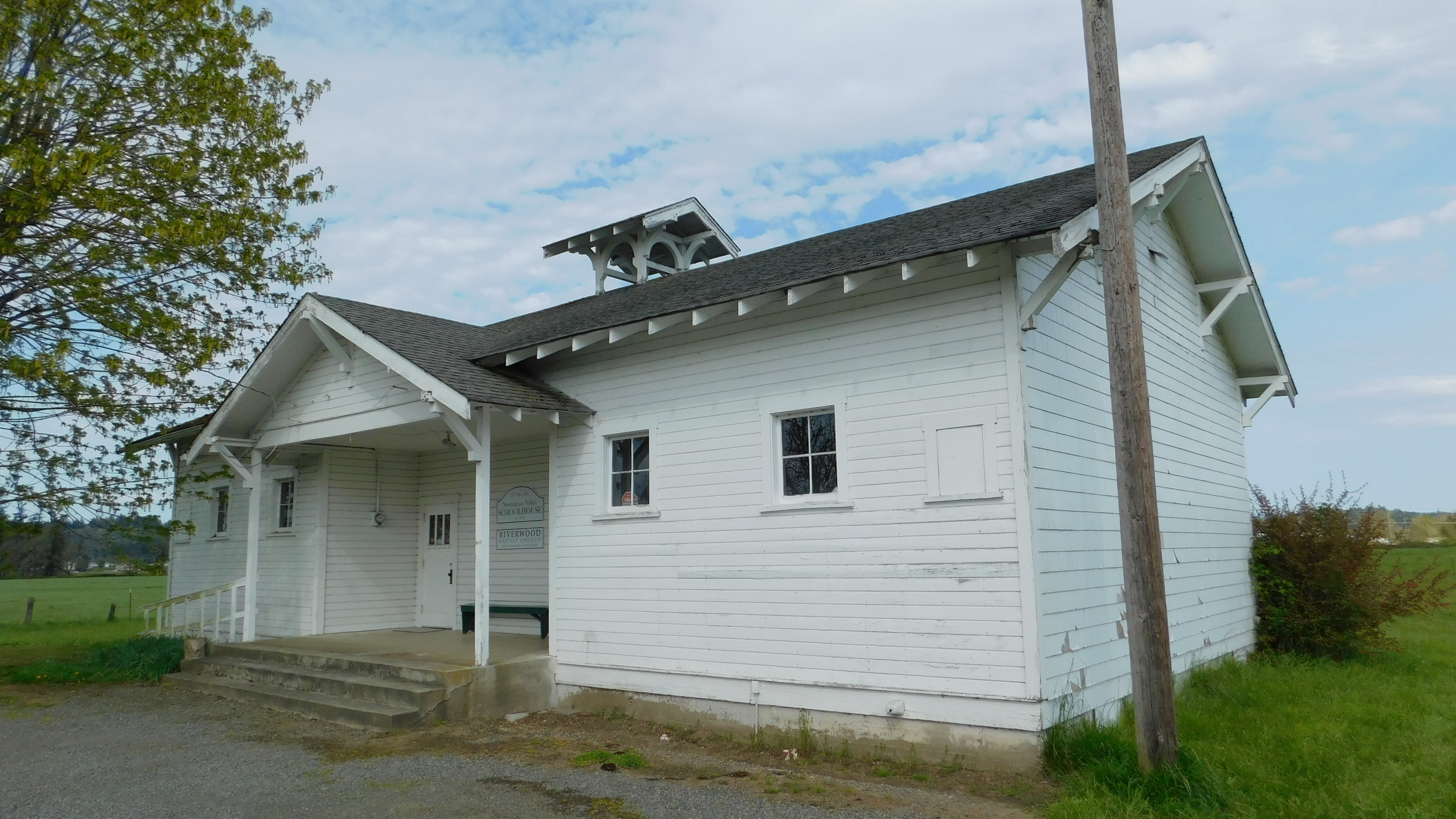
- Newaukum Valley Schoolhouse, 2022

- Location within Washington (state) Location within the United States
- Coordinates: 46°37′41.37″N 122°58′3.46″W
- Country: United States
- State: Washington
- County: Lewis
- Established: 1856
- Elevation: 318 ft (97 m)
- Time zone: UTC-8 (Pacific (PST))
  - Summer (DST): UTC-7 (PDT)
- ZIP Code: 98532
- Area code(s): 360, 564
- GNIS feature ID: 1511180

Newaukum, Washington is an unincorporated community located directly south of Chehalis, Washington in Lewis County. The community's name, which is theorized to mean "gently flowing waters", was spelled in various ways during its early formation, including Naw-waw-kum and Newaucum.

Settlement of the town began in 1852 and a first post office was established in 1856. The community grew after the construction of a Northern Pacific Railroad line in 1872 which bisected the area. After the railroad company requested a main depot on the tracks in Lewis County, Chehalis was ultimately chosen over Newaukum due to a combination of petitioning by Chehalis residents and travel difficulties through Newaukum. A small station was built in Newaukum and the town further developed to accompany the increase in the shipment of grain and timber production in the region. The community increased in size enough to briefly be considered as a county seat. By the turn of the 20th century, Newaukum contained a school, several shops and stores, and continued to be home to several sawmills and lumber manufacturing facilities.

With the creation of new mail routes in the county, the Newaukum post office was discontinued in 1907. The Newaukum Grange was created the same year and the community constructed the Newaukum Valley Schoolhouse in 1914. By the 1940s, the school was no longer used but both the building, and the grange organization, remained an active part of the community into the 21st century.

== Etymology ==
Named after the Newaukum River, the town began under the spelling, Neivaucum, and was located on the expanse of the Newaukum Prairie, also listed as "Nowaukum". Maps in the early days of non-Native settlement included the spelling of the prairie as "Naw-waw-kum". The name is a phrase or word possibly of French or indigenous origin. No official translation has been found, however it has been reported to mean, "gently flowing waters".

Two locations, both known as Newaukum Prairie, are known to have been labeled in Lewis County. A prairie landform is located north of Napavine and encompassed approximately 1,000 acres (400 ha). A potential settlement, established on March 11, 1878, existed near Glenoma. Most likely a donation land claim, the community was possibly relocated and became known as the town of Vern.

== History ==
=== 19th century ===
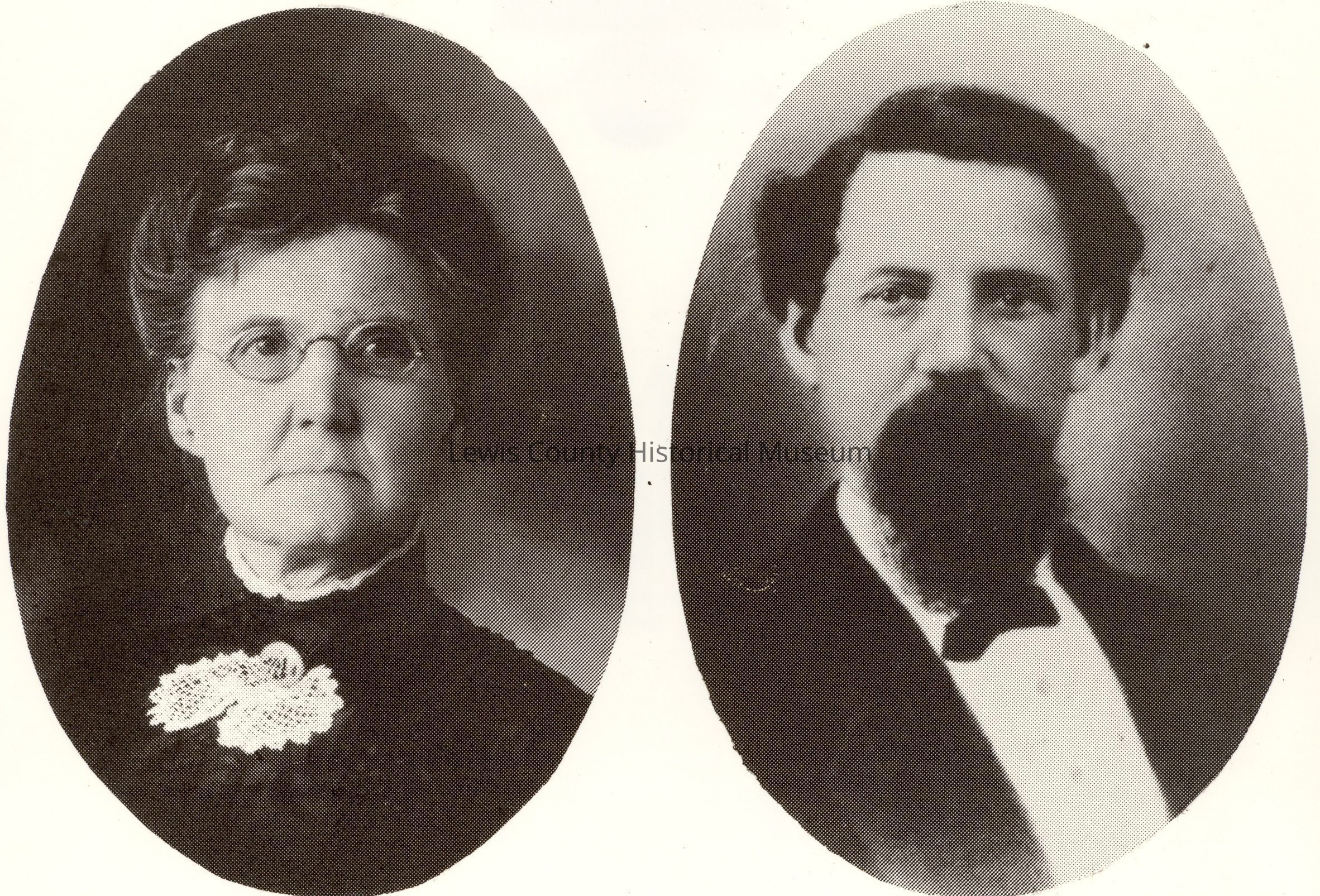
Anna and Hiram Shorey, 1870s

Among the earliest non-indigenous settlers at Newaukum were Anna and Hiram Shorey, arriving approximately in 1852. Anna's kinfolk, the Rue family, arrived from Illinois shortly thereafter. Native Americans continued to populate the area, often harvesting various berries and trading them at stores and outposts for other goods.

The first post office at Newaukum, spelled as "Newaucum", was overseen by postmaster Lewis Johnson and was operational by December 1856. It was listed as closed on March 25, 1863. The post office was restarted, spelled as "Newaueum" or "Nawaukum", on January 21, 1873. (Note: The first postmaster for the 1873 post office has been listed under several names including Luther J. Davis, Hiram Shorey, and Taylor Rue.) Luther Davis is reported to have briefly been the first postmaster, from January into June, 1873, followed by Shorey. Anne Shorey was the first "postmistress" of Newaukum between 1879 and 1893.

The Northern Pacific Railroad (NPR) began constructing a line through present-day Newaukum in 1872 and the company platted a town site; the first house in the officially formed community was begun in October of that year. The Lewis County portion of the track was completed in 1873 and crossed through the land claim of Elizabeth Saunders, known as the matriarch of the city of Chehalis. Then known as Saundersville, NPR requested land for a depot but Saunders refused the offered deal; the plan required her to donate a portion of her claim. Barrett increased the price of her holdings and the company opted for a newly platted site upon Newaukum Hill in the community of Newaukum; the site was chosen by J.W. Sprague, a superintendent for the railroad company. Sprague nominally purchased 40 acres (16 ha) on the hill and proceeded to survey and plat for a town site; (Note: Early notices of the new town of Newaukum reported that the community was being platted by a "General Tilton".) he had plans to sell plots at inflated prices. Residents of Chehalis continued, including via petition, to press for the main station. (Note: In reports of the efforts to place the depot in Chehalis, the petition was mentioned as requesting the station be placed on the farm of Obadiah B. McFadden.) Though Sprague denied the requests, he sent the petition to NPR's headquarters and allowed the returning train to drop off three railroad representatives in Chehalis rather than Newaukum.

Chehalis businessmen and residents began flagging down trains after being informed that locomotives were legally required to stop after being flagged. The efforts succeeded and the railroad company began regular train stops in Saundersville in 1874. The promise to build a larger depot in Newaukum was reported to be unfulfilled, but a small station, with a sidetrack and water pump, was constructed. The main track was built upon a continuous wooden trestle spanning over wetlands. Chehalis eventually became home to a depot in 1890 and the Northern Pacific Depot in 1912. Despite the loss of a main depot, Newaukum became recognized by the late 1870s as a large shipment center for grain in the region.

A general merchandise store was built and operated by the Shorey family, and lots were put up for sale. The community was considered as a site for the county seat for Lewis County, but residents in the surrounding valley objected to the proposal due to difficult travel over Newaukum Hill. Non-railroad travel for farmers and visitors in the area remained difficult due to the terrain and travel to the Newaukum station was considered "almost inaccessible"; people were required to walk along the tracks to reach the depot.

Over time, the settlement grew to include several businesses, such as a blacksmith shop, hotel, and a saloon. A sawmill was built in 1875, with two other mills constructed for shingle and lumber production in the 1880s. The Prindle sawmill and factory was destroyed by an "incendiary" fire in August 1882. A school was built and opened approximately in 1900 on Newaukum Hill, opposite the site of the present-day grange hall.

=== 20th century ===
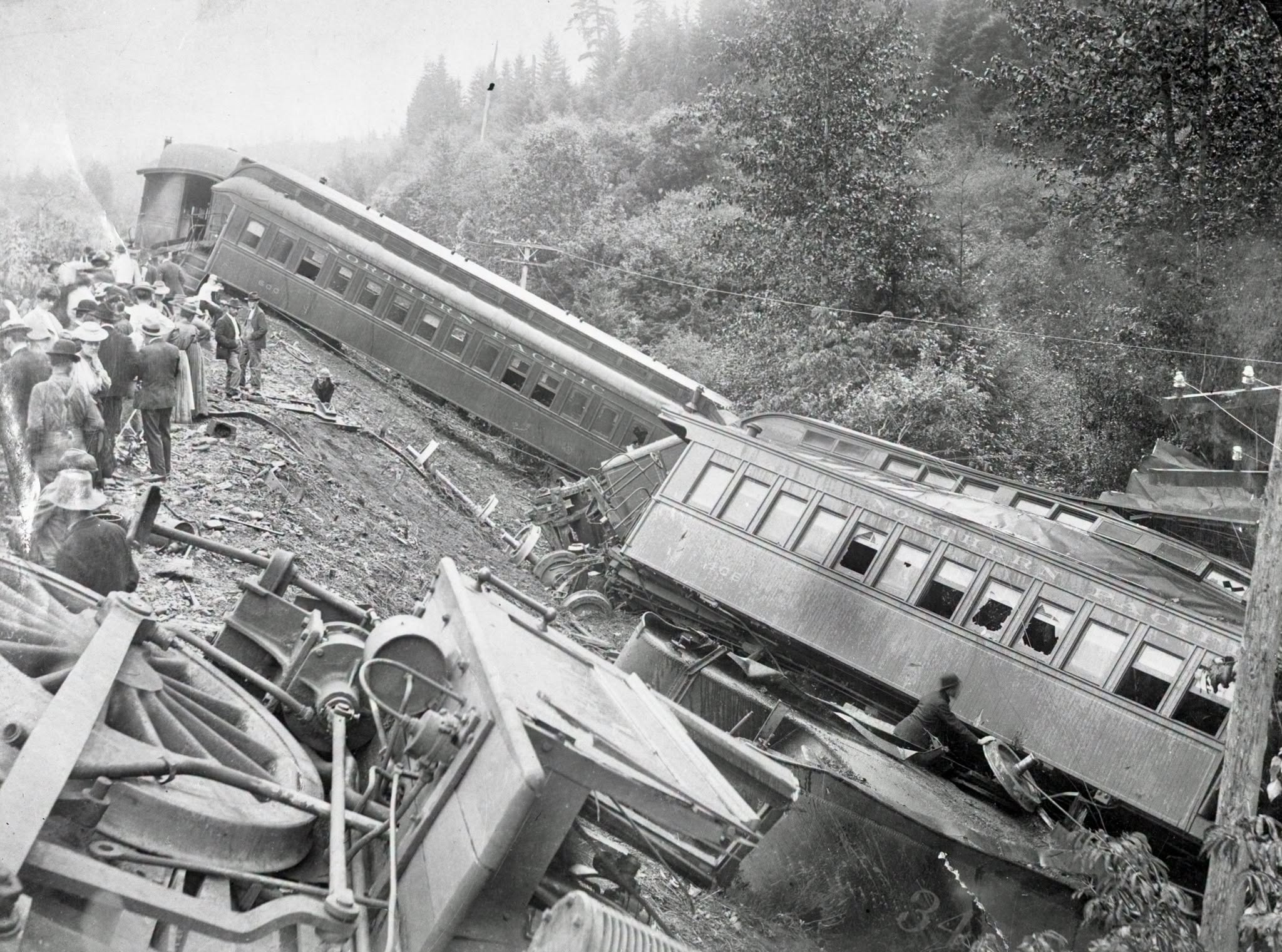
Train wreck at Newaukum, either 1901 or 1903

The population of the Newaukum precinct was 201 during the 1900 census, increasing to 281 during the 1910 count.

The railroad tracks at or near Newaukum had gained notoriety for the number of accidents and derailments at the turn of the 20th century. Train incidents included a 15-car wreck in March 1901. No fatalities were reported but a pusher engine was overturned. On August 22, 1903, a crash occurred after a boiler exploded on a Northern Pacific engine that was pulling seven coaches full of members of the Benevolent and Protective Order of Elks. A passenger car next to the tender came loose, leaving the tracks and falling down a 30 foot (9.1 metres) embankment, crushing itself against a tree stump. Several passengers were killed and early reports mentioned between 30 and 100 were injured. A derailment of seven cars, as well as an overturned engine, took place in the Newaukum yards in February 1907 after air brakes failed on a train coming down the hill. No serious injuries were reported except for "slight bruises" amongst the crew.

With the creation of a new rural route to Newaukum in 1906, the post office was proposed to be discontinued. The Newaukum post office, considered one of the oldest in the state, shuttered on either the first or second of January 1907. Officially closed due to the reconfiguration of routes in the county towards Morton, the Newaukum community was served instead by a rural route from the Chehalis Post Office. (Note: In an article from The Chehalis Bee-Nugget on the 1907 post office closure, the paper stated that the Newaukum office had been created in the 1860s and remained in continuous operation. See sources about the Newaukum post office history in the 19th century section for evidence of the discrepancy.)

In 1974, a group known as the Newaukum Hill Protective Association (NHPA) was formed for the purpose to work with the county for "orderly development" and planning. The NHPA had a survey conducted in early 1975 that determined that almost 60% of residents in Newaukum preferred a more agricultural community while opposing high density housing in the area; approximately 44% of owners listed their property to be used for farming. About 40% of respondents were noted to be against mobile homes. Members of the survey were 66% in favor of working with the association in "citizen planning" of the community.

The NHPA attempted to block the construction of a 95-unit mobile home development, known as Rolling Hills Mobile Estates, on Newaukum Hill near Nix Road in August 1975. The group sued Lewis County, who had approved the project without requiring an environmental impact statement. A Thurston County judge ruled in favor of the county and the planned development. The NHPA filed an appeal with the Washington Court of Appeals the next day, citing additional concerns over septic and sewage system overload and "other serious problems" the development may cause for the Newaukum community. The NHPA was led at the time by Warren Smith, who was a candidate for the Washington State Senate. Construction at the 40-acre (16 ha) site was allowed to continue, producing only one home, and three septic tanks, by August 1976. In June 1977, the development company filed a notice with the county that only 17 lots were to be built. The change was noted to be unaffiliated with any action due to the court case or potential settlement.

== Geography ==
The original plat of Newaukum was located west of the Newaukum River on the slopes of Newaukum Hill. After the build of railroad lines in the 1870s, the community is believed to have been split, with plots on hillsides paralleling the tracks. The platted center of Newaukum is generally believed to have been near the crossing of the railroad line with Rogers Road.

Forest fires in 1853 and 1857 led to a second-growth forest of Douglas fir on Newaukum Hill; the woodland was considered one of the "finest, mature stands" of its type in Southwest Washington. The forest became owned by the state as "common school trust land". By the mid-20th century, the land was managed by the Washington State Department of Natural Resources and the forest was logged during the 1960s to provide funding for Washington's school system. After harvesting, the hill was replanted in 1966 for potential use as a logging site in the 21st century.

== Arts and culture ==
=== Historic buildings and sites ===
The Newaukum Grange, associated with the Patrons of Husbandry, was founded on February 9, 1907, organizing and holding meetings at a saloon in the town. Known as No. 198, the organization registered 30 charter members in its first two months. The association later purchased a 1-acre (0.40 ha) lot for $50 (equivalent to $1,728 in 2025) and began constructing a grange hall in several phases. The first hall, measuring 32 ft × 68 ft (9.8 m × 20.7 m) with a 24 foot (7.3 m) ceiling, was completed and opened in December 1908. A present-day hall is located near the intersection of Old Highway 603 and Brown Road.

The community's first annual fair was held at the grange hall in 1921. The grange held a strawberry shortcake dinner every year since 1958; the event ceased in the late 1990s due to lack of grange membership. A 100th anniversary was held in April 2007; at the time, twenty members were listed as active with a total membership of 93 people.

The Newaukum Hill Cemetery was officially begun in 1902 by John Bower but the site was used as a cemetery possibly as early as 1886 with the first known burial, that of Maria Bower. Encompassing 1-acre (0.40 ha), the burial grounds are home to several early pioneers and settlers of Lewis County. The last internment was recorded in the 1970s. As of 2021, upkeep and maintenance of the burial grounds are based on volunteer efforts.

== Education ==
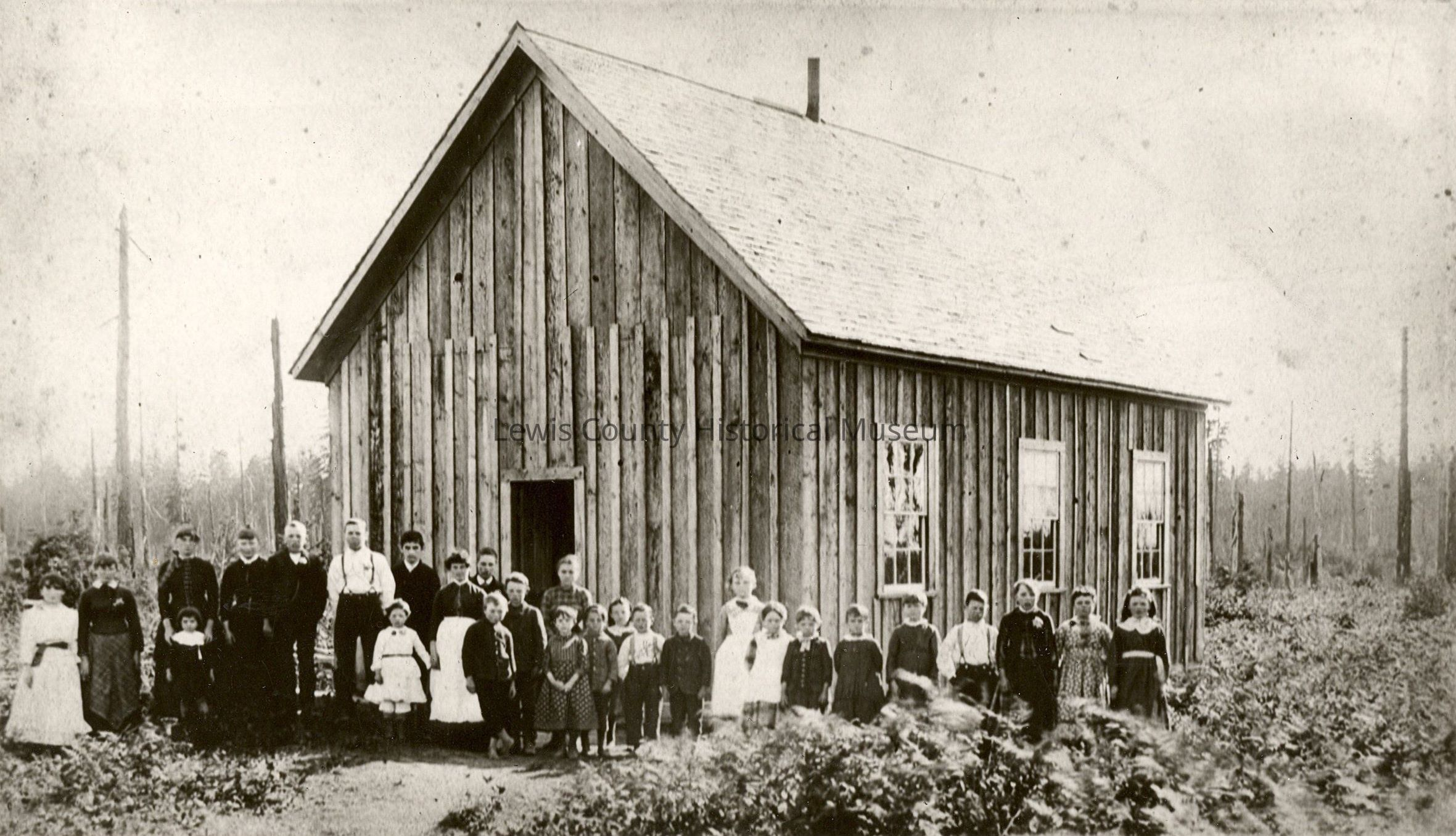
Newaukum schoolhouse, 1880s

In the early 20th century, the Newaukum school district, known as No. 27, recorded low enrollment numbers, such as 26 students in 1900, 37 pupils during the 1904 school year, and 40 children by 1922. During 1927, the district reached 50 enrollees and purchased an "orange and black" school bus, considered by the students to be "much more comfortable than the old bus".

A school building, known as the Newaukum Valley Schoolhouse, was constructed in Newaukum in 1914. The two-room, L-shaped building measured 26 ft × 65 ft (7.9 m × 19.8 m) and was built for $2,799 (equivalent to $89,968 in 2025). The school was originally heated by two wood-burning stoves that remained operational into 1967. Described as "big monsters", the stoves had to be fired early in order to warm the spacious school before an event. The schoolhouse had two rooms, hosting separate classrooms for first to fourth grades and fifth through eighth grades.

By the early 1940s, the schoolhouse was no longer used as an educational facility and was "saved from decay" by residents of Newaukum, The building was repurposed as a community meeting hall after it was purchased by a local group in the 1950s. An annual Christmas pageant has been held at the Newaukum Valley school building at least since the mid-1950s, continuing a tradition once held by students.

== Government and politics ==
Presidential Elections Results
| Year | Republican | Democratic | Third parties |
|---|---|---|---|
| 2008 | 65.7% 530 | 32.3% 261 | 2.0% 16 |
| 2012 | 70.7% 347 | 27.9% 137 | 1.4% 7 |
| 2016 | 67.1 316 | 25.3% 119 | 7.6% 36 |
| 2020 | 64.7% 383 | 33.3% 197 | 2.0% 12 |
| 2024 | 66.3% 455 | 31.2% 214 | 2.5% 17 |

The 2020 election included votes for candidates of the Libertarian Party and 5 votes for write-in candidates. In the 2024 election, there were 4 votes cast for write-in candidates and 9 votes were tallied for Robert F. Kennedy Jr..

== Infrastructure ==
Newaukum was connected to Winlock after the construction of a plank road in 1894. In January 1907, the community received its first telephone line service; eight customers were noted to have subscribed.

By 1906, Northern Pacific Railroad had been considering "cutting off the grade" on Newaukum Hill after the company purchased Union Pacific tracks that went around the landform. The following year, an early attempt to circumvent the "time-losing" hill was undertaken. However, the track over the hill was doubled instead during a 1909 project that consisted of over 2,000 laborers. The Newaukum Hill tracks were considered the "heaviest grade on the whole line" between Portland and Tacoma. In the 1910s, the Newaukum Railroad Company operated out of the station, providing service to Onalaska.
