= List of Pacific Northwest windstorms =

Pacific Northwest windstorms are extratropical cyclones which form in the Pacific basin, and affect land areas in the Pacific Northwest of the United States and British Columbia, Canada. Despite cold waters preventing tropical cyclones from approaching the area, the area is often affected by extratropical cyclones. These cyclones can produce winds equivalent to a Category 2-3 hurricane. The area's trees greatly enhance the damage, and these storms have caused at least $10 billion ($15 billion in 2025) in damage since 1950. The closest analog to these storms are European windstorms, which develop over the eastern portion of the North Atlantic Ocean as opposed to the North Pacific.

Pacific Northwest windstorms
Storm	Image	Winds (Note: All winds are gusts unless otherwise stated.) (Note: Winds measured with four-cup brass anemometers (before 1928) are not comparable to modern three-cup anemometers.) / MSLP	Maximum known rainfall / snowfall	Damage / Deaths	Notes	Refs.
January 1862 North American Megastorm/1861-1862 ARkStorm	Lithograph showing a flooded street in Sacramento caused by the January 1862 North American Megastorm	Unknown winds Unknown pressure	102 in (2,600 mm) of rain at Sonora, California, 15 ft (180 in; 460 cm) feet of snow in the Sierra Nevada	$100 million ($3.23 billion in 2025) >4000 deaths	Caused the Great Flood of 1862. The ARkStorm scenario draws inspiration from this event. Impacts extended all the way down to Mexico. An estimated one-third of the state's property was destroyed and one-quarter of California's economy was destroyed.	
Great Gale of 1880	N/A	138 mph (222 km/h) (estimated) "along the coast" 955 mbar (28.2 inHg)	9.87 in (251 mm) of rain at Portland, Oregon 48 in (120 cm; 4.0 ft) of snow at Port Townsend, Washington	Unknown damage >=5 deaths	Unusually heavy snow was recorded, collapsing structures in Seattle.	
Great Olympic Blowdown of 1921	An aerial view of trees blown down by the Great Olympic Blowdown	140 mph (230 km/h) (3-minute sustained) near Grays Harbor, Washington (Note: Highest estimated gusts are 150 mph (241 km/h), although the storm was "said to have a velocity of 180 miles per hour".) <28.78 inHg (975 mbar)	Unknown amount of rain Unknown amount of snow	$150 million ($2.71 billion in 2025) >=1 death	Biggest blowdown in US history at the time. The event felled eight times more trees than the 1980 eruption of Mount St. Helens. The entire Olympic coastline had at least a 20% loss of trees.	
The Great Pacific-Northwest Storm of October 21, 1934	N/A	109 mph (175 km/h) at North Head Light, Washington "probably" 28.6 inHg (970 mbar)	1.4 in (36 mm) of rain on Salem, Oregon Unknown amount of snow	$1.7 million ($40.9 million in 2025) 19-22 deaths		
Columbus Day storm of 1962	Surface weather map showing the Columbus Day storm	179 kn (332 km/h; 206 mph) at Cape Blanco (Oregon) ~955 mbar (28.2 inHg)	20 in (510 mm) of rain at Blue Canyon, California Unknown amount of snowfall	$230 million ($2.45 billion in 2025) >=46 deaths	The storm formed from the remnants of Typhoon Freda. This storm is sometimes referred to the most powerful windstorm to strike the Pacific Northwest.	
November 13–15, 1981 windstorm	The first of two low-pressure systems to impact the Pacific Northwest on November 13–15, 1981	121.8 mph (196.0 km/h) (1-minute sustained) at Whiskey Run, Oregon <950 mbar (28 inHg)	Unknown amount of rain 4 ft (48 in; 120 cm) of snow in the Sierra Nevada	$50 million ($177 million in 2025) 12 deaths	This event consisted of two low-pressure systems, one after the other.	
Inauguration Day windstorm of 1993	The Inauguration Day storm on the morning of January 20, 1993	98 mph (158 km/h) near Tillamook, Oregon 976 mbar (28.8 inHg)	>6 in (150 mm) of rain at Venado, California and Healdsburg, California 1 ft (12 in; 30 cm) of snow in the Cascade Range in Oregon	$159 million ($354 million in 2025) 6 deaths	Sometimes referred to as the worst storm since the Columbus Day storm.	
December 12, 1995 windstorm	The December 12, 1995 storm on the afternoon of December 11	134 mph (216 km/h) at Kregor Peak, California 955 mb (28.2 inHg)	15.01 in (381 mm) of rain at the Russian River (California) Unknown amounts of snow	$240 million ($507 million in 2025) 3 deaths	Sometimes referred to as the strongest wind event since the Columbus Day storm.	
South Valley Surprise of 2002	An infrared satellite image of the South Valley Surprise of 2002	121 mph (195 km/h) in central Douglas County, Oregon 995-996 mb (29.4 inHg)	Unknown amounts of rain 18 in (46 cm; 1.5 ft) of snow at Timberline Lodge, Oregon	$10–12 million ($16.9-20.3 million in 2023) Unknown deaths, 4 injuries	A Presidential Disaster Declaration was issued for five counties in Oregon.	
Hanukkah Eve windstorm of 2006	The Hanukkah Eve Storm offshore Washington Coast taken on December 15, 2006 at 2:00 UTC.	115 mph (185 km/h) at Estevan Point, British Columbia 970 mbar (29 inHg)	~150 mm (5.9 in) of rain in the Olympic Mountains >10 in (25 cm; 0.83 ft) of snow in Okanogan County, Washington	$500 million-1 billion ($756 million-1.51 billion in 2023) (estimates vary) 13-18 deaths (sources vary)	Most (8-11)fatalities were caused by carbon monoxide poisoning. 1.8 million people were left without power. Washington governor Christine Gregoire declared a state of emergency for parts of the state, and a federal disaster declaration was approved for parts of Washington and Oregon, with over $30 million ($46.6 million in 2025) in federal funding for Washington and $5 million ($7.76 million in 2025) for Oregon.	
Great Coastal Gale of 2007	The third low-pressure system on December 3, 2007 at 9:30 UTC	130 kn (240 km/h; 150 mph) along the coast 952 mbar (28.1 inHg)	17.4 in (440 mm) of rain at Cushman Dam 12-20 in (30-51 cm, 1.0-1.7 ft) of snow in the Cascade Range	>$1 billion ($1.55 billion in 2025) 18 deaths	This storm was composed of three low-pressure systems, with the third being the strongest. The storm moved much slower than normal storms in this area, leading to a long period of hurricane-force gusts. This storm dropped unusually large amounts of rain, with several flood and rainfall records being broken in Washington and Oregon. This storm resulted in the first hurricane force wind warning ever issued.	
January 2010 North American winter storms	Three of the storm systems on January 17, 2010	94 mph (151 km/h) in Ajo, Arizona 960 mbar (28 inHg)	>20 in (510 mm) of rain in the higher elevations of California >90 in (230 cm; 7.5 ft) of snow around Mammoth Lakes, California	>=$3 million ($4.43 million in 2025) >=10 deaths	Several systems impacted the United States. Seven tornadoes were reported. Several pressure records were broken in California.	
December 2014 North American storm complex	Satellite image of the system off the coast of California, on December 10, 2014	139 mph (224 km/h) at White Mountain Peak, California 960 mbar (28 inHg)	14.6 in (370 mm) of rain at Petrified Forest (California) 19.8 in (50 cm; 1.65 ft) of snow at Lodgepole, California	>=$100 million ($136 million in 2025) 3 deaths	A tornado was observed in Los Angeles.	
August 29, 2015, windstorm	Downed power lines from the August 29, 2015, windstorm	145 km/h (90 mph) at Destruction Island, Washington 985 mbar (29.1 inHg)		>$45,021,594 ($61.2 million in 2025) 2 deaths	At least 400,000 homes and 710,000 people lost power in British Columbia, marking the largest power outage in BC Hydro history.	
October 2021 Northeast Pacific bomb cyclone	Satellite image of the bomb cyclone prior to reaching its peak intensity on October 24, 2021	159 mph (256 km/h) at Mammoth Mountain, California 942 mbar (27.8 inHg)	16.56 in (421 mm) of rain at Middle Peak, California 42 inches (110 cm; 3.5 ft) of snow at Mount Rose, Nevada	>$400 million ($475 million in 2025) >=2 deaths	This was the most intense storm ever recorded in the Northeastern Pacific Ocean, later tied by the November 2024 Northeast Pacific bomb cyclone.	
November 2024 Northeast Pacific bomb cyclone	Picture of a bomb cyclone off the Pacific Northwest coast on the afternoon of November 19, 2024	101 mph (163 km/h) offshore Vancouver Island 942 mbar (27.8 inHg)	22.57 in (57.3 cm) of rain at Venado, California	>$41 million 4 deaths	This storm is tied with the October 2021 Northeast Pacific bomb cyclone as the most intense storm recorded in the Northeastern Pacific Ocean.	
