= Big Blow =

The Big Blow may refer to:

== Storms ==
- An 1880 storm on the Great Lakes
- Great Lakes Storm of 1913
- Great Olympic Blowdown of 1921
- Columbus Day Storm of 1962

== Other instances ==
- The Big Blow (novel), a 2000 novel
- "The Big Blow Out" episode of Teenage Mutant Ninja Turtles
- Operation Big Blow in World War II
- "The Big Blow-Up" episode of Arthur
- "The Big Blow Up" episode of ChalkZone
- An altercation between Billy Joe Mantooth and Dan Fowler (1981)
