= Pacific Northwest windstorm =

Type of extratropical cyclone

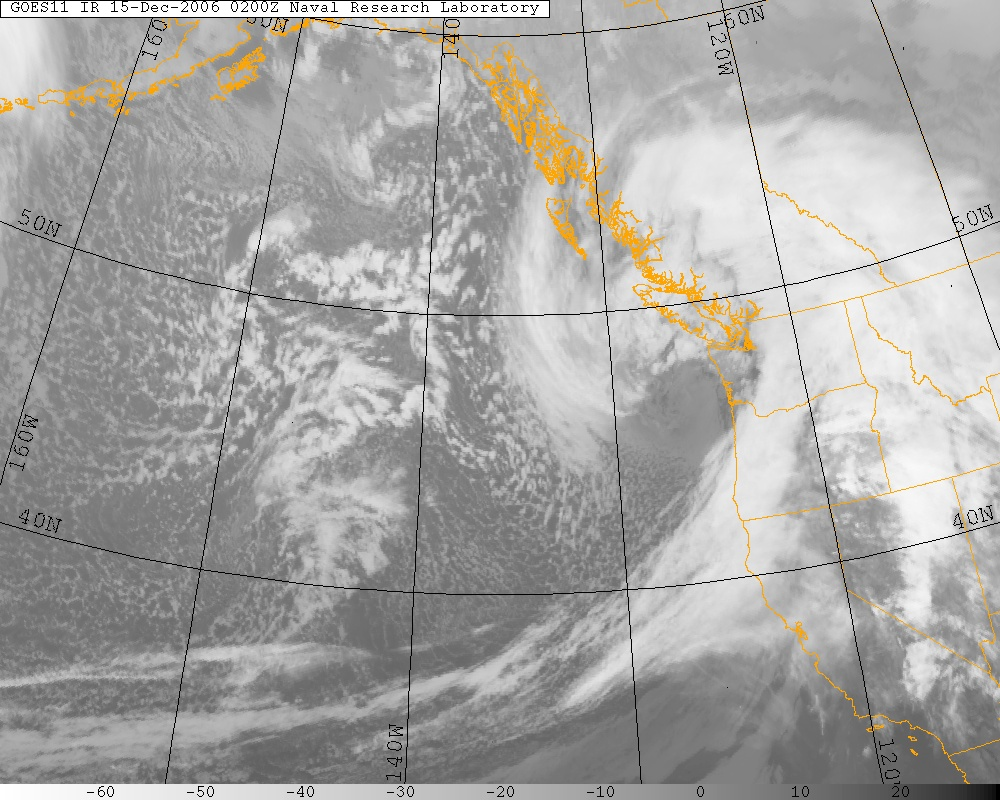
Hanukkah Eve windstorm of 2006 off the Washington Coast on December 15, 2006, at 02:00 UTC.

Pacific Northwest windstorms, sometimes colloquially known as Big Blows, are extratropical cyclones which form in the Pacific basin, and affect land areas in the Pacific Northwest of the United States and British Columbia, Canada. They form as cyclonic windstorms associated with areas of low atmospheric pressure that track across the North Pacific Ocean towards western North America. Deep low pressure areas are relatively common over the North Pacific. They are most common in the winter months. On average, the month when most windstorms form is November or December.

The closest analogue to these storms are European windstorms, which develop over the eastern portion of the North Atlantic Ocean as opposed to the North Pacific. Nor'easters, a similar class of extratropical cyclones, commonly affect the east coast of North America. While the storms on the East Coast are named "nor'easters", the Pacific Northwest windstorms are not called "nor'westers" because the cyclones' primary winds can blow from any direction, while the primary winds in nor'easters usually blow from the northeast.

The largest storm events have struck the Pacific Northwest every 15 to 30 years according to modern records. Among the strongest were the 1962 Columbus Day storm, which formed from the remnants of Typhoon Frieda/Freda and killed 50 people; the 1993 Inauguration Day windstorm, which killed 6 people; and the 2006 Hanukkah Eve windstorm, which killed 14 people and caused widespread power outages for 11 days.

== Categories and frequency ==
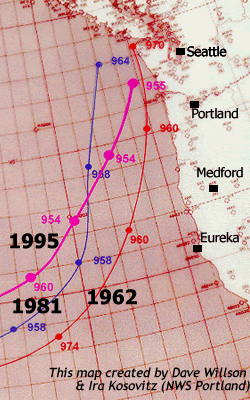
Storm tracks of the central low pressure of the storms which hit the Pacific Northwest in 1962, 1981 and 1995

Office of Washington State Climatologist Windstorm Categories
Average Peak Instant Gust (mph)	Windstorm Category	Approximate Return Interval
39–44	Minor	Several per year
45–54	Moderate	Annual
55–64	Major	Once every 20–30 years
65–74	Extreme	Once every 50–100 years
75+	Phenomenal	Once every 250–500 years

=== Notable Pacific Northwest windstorms ===
- 1880: Great Gale of 1880
- 1921: January 29, the Great Olympic Blowdown.
- 1962: Columbus Day Storm began life as tropical storm Typhoon Frieda/Freda.
- 1979: February 13 windstorm leads to the catastrophic failure of the Hood Canal Bridge.
- 1981: Friday the 13th Windstorms, November 13–15
- 1990: November 22–24, Mercer Island bridge sinking Washington state
- 1993: Inauguration Day windstorm, January 20. Claimed six lives, 750,000 homes and businesses without power with total damage in Western Washington of $130 million, and later tied with November 2024 Bomb Cyclone. Also caused $500,000 in damage to the Evergreen Point Floating Bridge.
- 1995: December 11–12
- 1999: March 2–3, 1999
- 2000: January 16, 2000
- 2002: South Valley Surprise of 2002
- 2006: The Hannukah Eve windstorm caused hundreds of millions of dollars in damage, left over 1.8 million residences and businesses without power, and killed eighteen. Most deaths were caused by carbon monoxide poisoning in the days following the storm because of improper use of barbecue cookers and generators indoors.
- 2007: Great Coastal Gale of 2007
- 2012: November 19
- 2013: Remnants of Typhoon Pabuk on September 28–29, 2013 caused heavy rain in Portland, Oregon had the wettest September ever on record. The moisture from the Pineapple Express coming from Hawaii.
- 2014: December 11: Brought the strongest recorded wind gust to Portland since 1995, of 59 MPH
- 2015: August 29–30 windstorm knocking out power to 710,000 customers in British Columbia's Lower Mainland region. Several municipalities in Metro Vancouver were without power for three days; at the time it was the largest outage in BC Hydro's recorded history.
- 2015, December 21
- 2016: March 9
- 2016: Ides of October storm, Typhoon Songda transitioned into an extratropical storm as it crossed the North Pacific and approached the west coast of North America. Originally, expected to be a historic windstorm to make a direct hit on Washington State, the worst of the storm ended up staying offshore. Despite this, coastal regions reported winds as high as 100 mph and an EF-2 tornado touched down in Manzanita.
- 2018: December 20, as winds approached (and occasionally exceeded) 100 km/h, trees came down, high seas cancelled ferries and over 750,000 customers in British Columbia lost power; causing the largest outage in BC Hydro's recorded history. One man needed to be rescued by helicopter from the damaged White Rock Pier and a woman was killed in Duncan after being struck by a tree.
- 2021: October 2021 Northeast Pacific bomb cyclone. Powerful storm system that underwent rapid bombogenesis with air pressure bottoming out at 942 hPa. Heavy rain and snow along with strong winds were reported.
- 2024: November 2024 Northeast Pacific bomb cyclone. Powerful storm system that tied the October 2021 bomb cyclone for the lowest pressure recorded in the Pacific Northwest, and even since Inauguration Day Storm of 1993.

== See also ==
- Nor'easter – A similar class of powerful extratropical cyclones that affects the east coast of North America.
