= Northeast Pacific bomb cyclone =

Northeast Pacific bomb cyclone may refer to one of the following:

- November 2014 Bering Sea cyclone
- October 2021 Northeast Pacific bomb cyclone
- November 2024 Northeast Pacific bomb cyclone
