= January 2012 Pacific Northwest snowstorm =

Weather event in North America

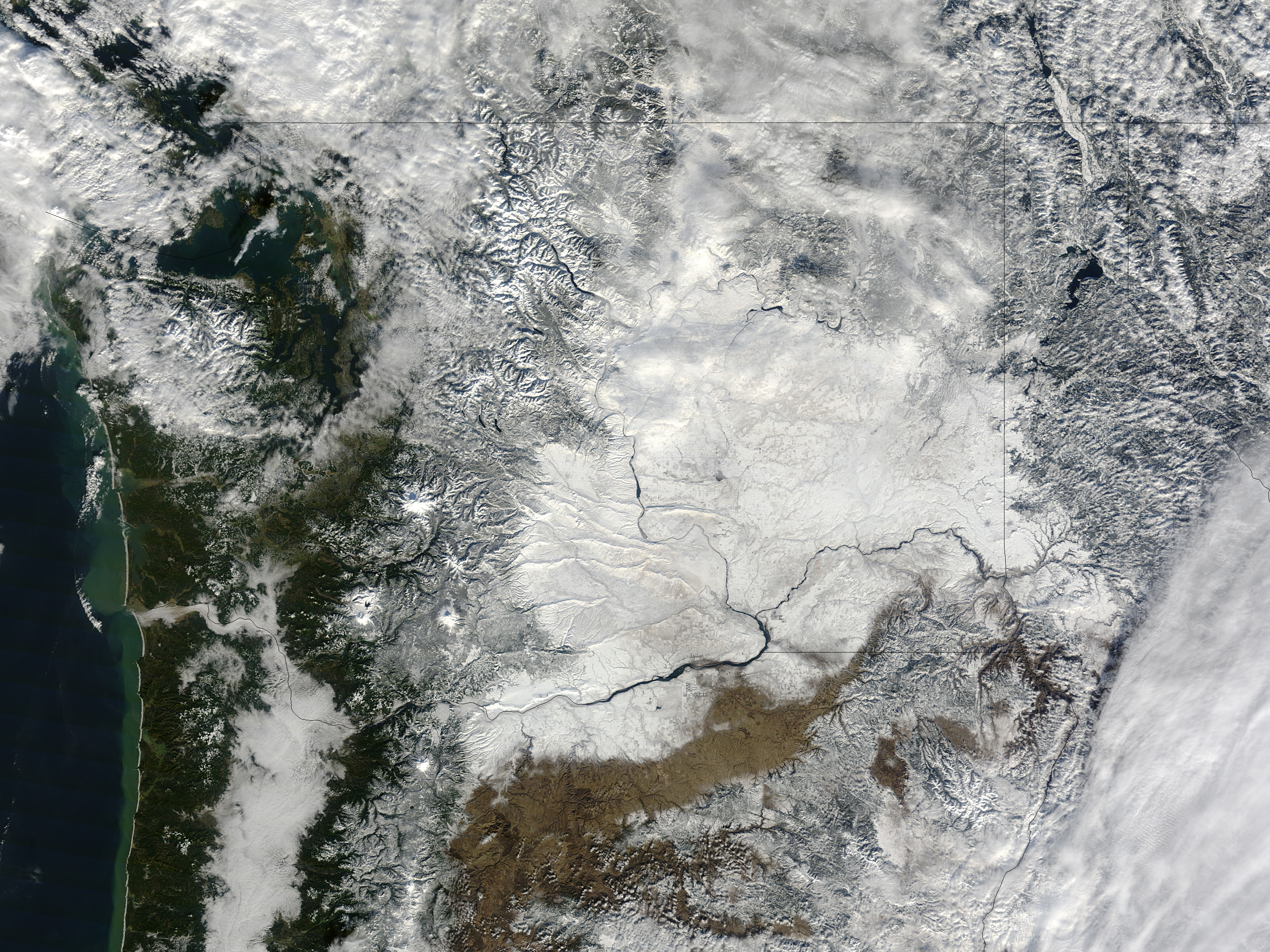
- Satellite view of Oregon and Washington on January 23, 2012, showing clouds and snow

Meteorological history
- Formed: January 16, 2012
- Dissipated: January 20, 2012

Extratropical cyclone
- Lowest pressure: 992 mb (29.3 inHg)
- Max. snowfall: 50 in (1,300 mm) snowfall — reported in Mount Hood Meadows, Oregon

Overall effects
- Fatalities: 3 fatalities
- Damage: $50 million (2012 USD)
- Areas affected: Washington, Oregon, California, Idaho, Wyoming, Utah, Montana, British Columbia
- Power outages: 200,000
- Part of the 2011–12 North American winter

The January 2012 Pacific Northwest snowstorm was a large extratropical cyclone that brought record snowfall to the Pacific Northwest in January 2012. The storm produced very large snowfall totals, reaching up to 50 inches (1,300 mm) in Oregon. A 110 mph (180 km/h) wind gust was reported at Otter Rock, Oregon. A mother and child were killed in Oregon after the car they were in slid into a creek, while a man was killed in the Seattle area. About 200,000 homes were without power in the Greater Seattle area after the storm.

== Meteorological synopsis ==
The storm was first noted just off the coast of British Columbia on January 16, with a central pressure of 1,018 millibars (30.1 inHg). The center of the low pressure area had then moved south to about 300 miles (480 km) off the Oregon Coast. At the same time, the storm had attained peak intensity of 992 millibars (29.3 inHg). The storm then began to move closer to the coastline, and by 2000 UTC on January 18, the storm was located about 40 miles (64 km) off the coast of Washington. By 0200 UTC the next day, 28.9 inches (730 mm) of snow had already fallen in Stanley, Idaho.

== Impact ==
=== United States ===
The National Weather Service (NWS) began issuing severe weather warnings for the whole of the Pacific Northwest on January 17 and 18. A hurricane-force wind warning was issued for offshore Oregon at about 1600 UTC on January 18. A storm warning was also issued for parts of California and Oregon. Numerous flights were cancelled due to heavy snow and rain. The NWS office in Missoula, Montana, said that this storm ranked in the top seven of the top snowfall events in the area.

Interstate 5 near Centralia, Washington, was closed temporarily due to powerlines brought down by snowfall; the standard detour route was also blocked by trees and powerlines. Amtrak service between Portland and Seattle was canceled due to trees and debris left on tracks. More than 12 Oregon highways were closed due to storm damage, and many more were partly closed. Oregon Route 213 near Molalla closed for several days due to an undermined roadbed beside a culvert.

== Non-winter weather events ==
=== Rainfall ===
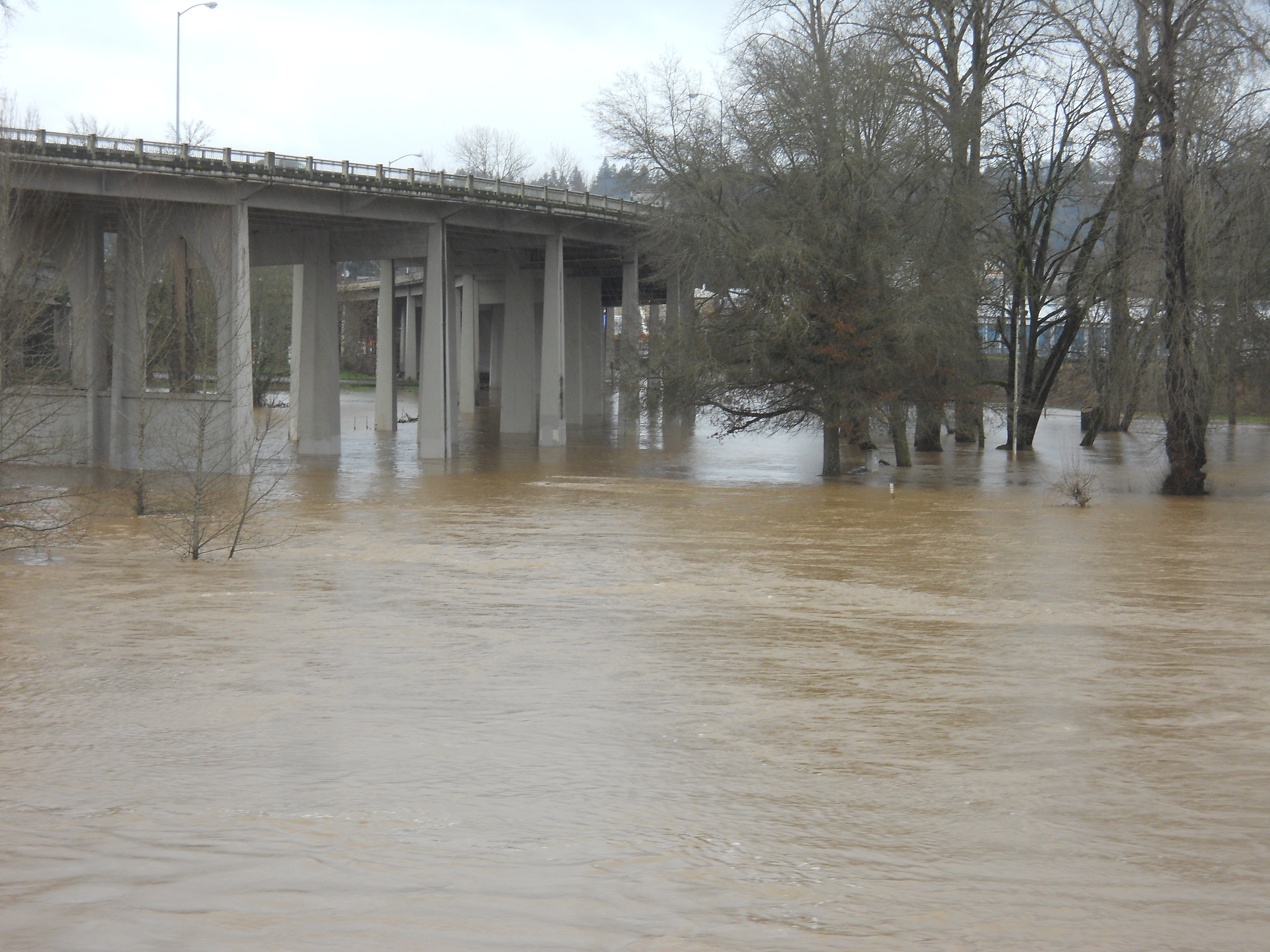
Flooding of the Willamette River in Salem, Oregon, in the aftermath of the storm

A Pineapple Express event brought heavy precipitation to Western Oregon, generally more so than to western Washington, with most precipitation in the form of rain instead of snow. Eugene broke its precipitation record for January 18, and Salem came within 0.07 inches (1.8 mm) of breaking its record for January 19. The weather was attributed to La Niña.

Precipitation recorded at select Pacific Northwest locations, January 18–20
Place	Precipitation (inches)
Salem, Oregon	5.25
Eugene, Oregon	4.34
Astoria, Oregon	4.10
Portland, Oregon	3.50
Olympia, Washington	3.05
Tofino, British Columbia	2.31
Seattle, Washington	1.91
Medford, Oregon	1.74
Quillayute Airport (Washington)	1.37
Victoria, British Columbia	0.94
Klamath Falls, Oregon	0.83
Vancouver, British Columbia	0.72
Redmond, Oregon	0.25

== See also ==
- 2006 Central Pacific cyclone
- Great Gale of 1880
- Columbus Day Storm of 1962
- South Valley Surprise of 2002
- Hanukkah Eve windstorm of 2006
- Great Coastal Gale of 2007
