= South Valley Surprise of 2002 =

Wind storm in the United States

South Valley Surprise
Meteorological history
- Formed: February 7, 2002
- Dissipated: February 7, 2002

Extratropical cyclone
- Highest gusts: 88 mph in Bandon, Oregon
- Lowest pressure: 994 mb (hPa)

Overall effects
- Damage: $22.1 million (2002 USD)
- Areas affected: British Columbia, Washington, Oregon, Northern California, Nevada, Idaho, and Western Montana

The South Valley Surprise of 2002 was a Pacific Northwest windstorm that affected the U.S. states of Oregon, Washington, California, Nevada, and Idaho on February 7, 2002.

== Overview ==
The storm underwent rapid cyclogenesis just before travelling inland. The circulation was so small in area that the isobars were compacted tightly, thanks to a strong ridge of high pressure to the south, resulting in sustained winds of 50 mph with gusts above 70 mph. The South Valley Surprise was second only to the Columbus Day Storm in terms of wind speed for the southern Willamette Valley. The "surprise" was how rapidly the storm organized and matured, and its unanticipated strength. Thus, the public had no idea of the impending storm. The storm was able to tap into the jet stream and aim it towards the surface the phenomenon known as "Jet stream enhancement", which usually occurs in the unstable air found in a cold front in a mid latitude cyclone. The result was extensive damage to structures both directly and indirectly from falling trees and debris.

== See also ==
- Hanukkah Eve windstorm of 2006
- Great Coastal Gale of 2007
- January 2012 Pacific Northwest snowstorm
