= Great Olympic Blowdown =

The Great Olympic Blowdown, also called the Big Blow, was a compact, intense windstorm that struck the coast of Washington on January 29, 1921. The storm is remembered for the massive number of trees destroyed. At the time, it was the greatest loss of timber in the country, according to the Forest Service. In the twentieth century, only the Columbus Day Storm of 1962 was stronger.

== Description ==
The storm started southwest of Washington and tracked northeast. Barometric pressure dropped, reaching a low of 979 millibars (28.90 inches) at which time winds were 40 miles per hour (64 km/h). Wind velocity quickly increased to 100 miles per hour (160 km/h). The wind hit at noon in Grays Harbor and moved up the peninsula. The North Head Lighthouse recorded sustained winds at 113 miles per hour (182 km/h) and gusts estimated at 150 miles per hour (240 km/h) before the anemometer was blown away. Inland, gusts reached 64 miles per hour (103 km/h) in Seattle, 48 miles per hour (77 km/h) in Tacoma, and 47 miles per hour (76 km/h) as far inland as Walla Walla.

An observer on the M. S. Sierra off the coast of Oregon reported:

At 9 a. m. on the 29th the wind, which previously had died down to force 3, increased to force 5, SSE.; by noon it had increased to force 12 and changed to S. and a little later to WSW., when it started to lose its force. A high and choppy sea was running and the vessel was rolling, pitching, and shipping heavy seas. For a while it seemed that we would lose our deck load of lumber and this would have happened had the wind not moderated when it did. When the wind was at its highest force, between 11 a. m. and 12 noon, the water of the sea was driven in the air in sheets just like heavy rain driven by a strong wind.

An observer for the Weather Bureau at North Head, thinking that the worst of the storm had passed, drove into town for supplies only to be caught by rapidly increasing winds. In his report, he states:

The southeast wind roared through the forest, the falling trees crashed to the ground in every direction from where we stood. Many were broken off where their diameter was as much as 4 feet. A giant spruce fell across the roadway burying itself through the planks within 10 feet of where we stood. Three tops broke off and sailed through the air, some of the trees fell with a crash, others toppled over slowly as their roots were torn from the earth. In a few minute there were but two trees left standing that were dangerous to us and we watched every movement of their large trunks and comparatively small tops.

The center of the storm did not make landfall. Because the coast was sparsely populated, damage was to trees, animals, and structures; only one person died in the Great Olympic Blowdown. A weaker windstorm in 1934 killed twenty-one people, injuring more than 100, because its track took it over land.

== Damage ==
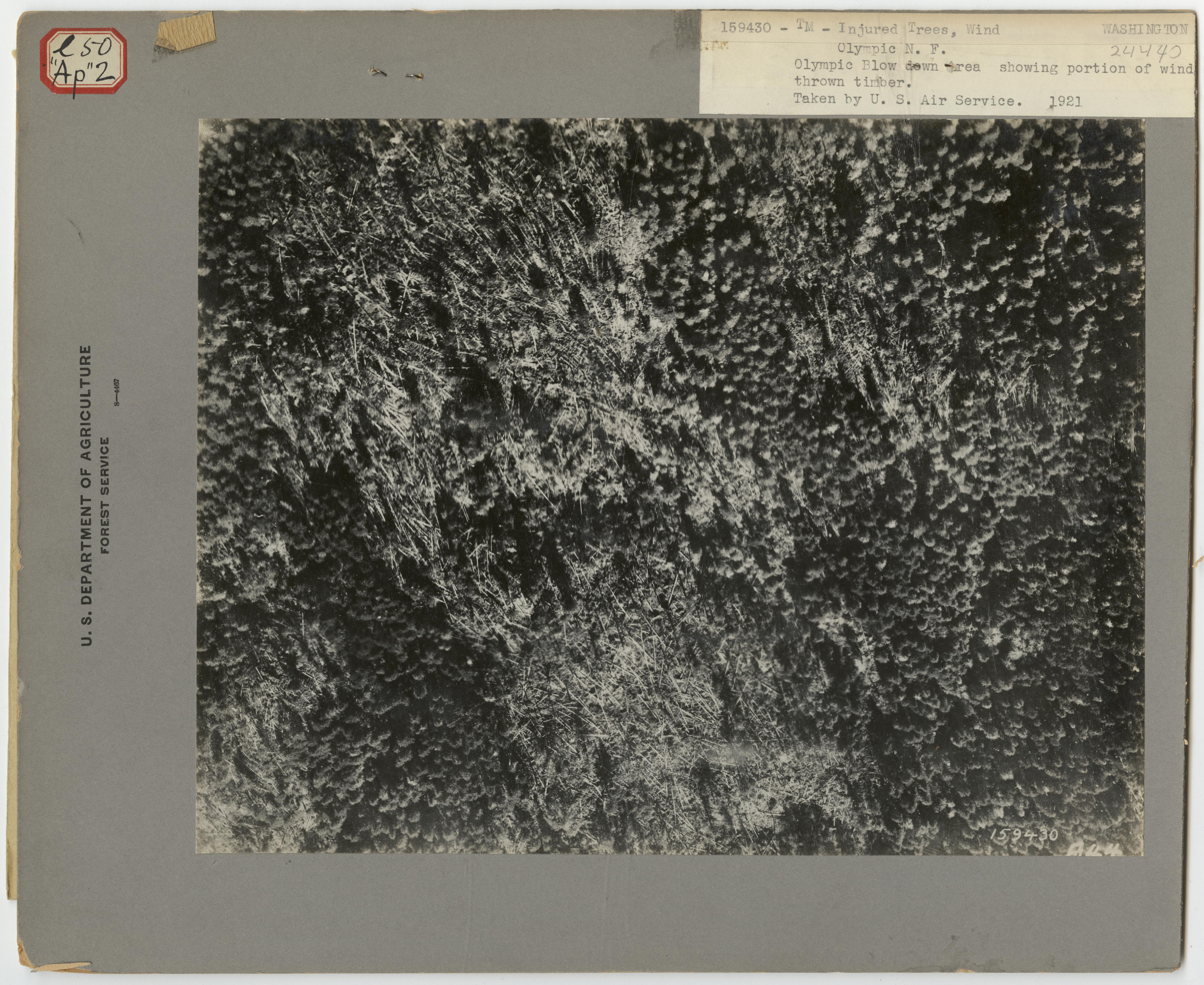
Aerial photograph of wind-blown timber, 1921

Hurricane-force winds destroyed billions of board-feet of timber across the Olympic Peninsula. Over 40 percent of the trees on the southwest side of the Olympic Mountains were blown down. The Great Olympic Blowdown felled eight times more trees than the eruption of Mount St. Helens. The old-growth timber that was destroyed created a fire hazard, and fire suppression crews were deployed by the U.S. Forest Service, the state of Washington, and the Washington Forest Fire Association (WFFA). Air patrols to support the fire suppression crews were provided by the U.S. Army at Camp Lewis, with the state and WFFA contributing money for gas.

A herd of 200 Roosevelt elk were killed near Forks by tree branches and flying debris and hundreds of domestic farm animals were killed.

Sixteen homes in La Push were destroyed. Power and telephone lines were downed. Moored boats were dashed on the beaches. Twenty-one barges were adrift in Puget Sound after breaking from their mooring lines. Smokestacks and chimneys collapsed. Chief engineer Alfred A. Anderson was killed at an Aberdeen mill when a collapsing smokestack filled the room with steam, scalding Anderson to death.

== See also ==
- Pacific Northwest windstorm
- Great Gale of 1880
- February 13, 1979 windstorm
