= October 2021 Northeast Pacific bomb cyclone =

North American bomb cyclone in 2021

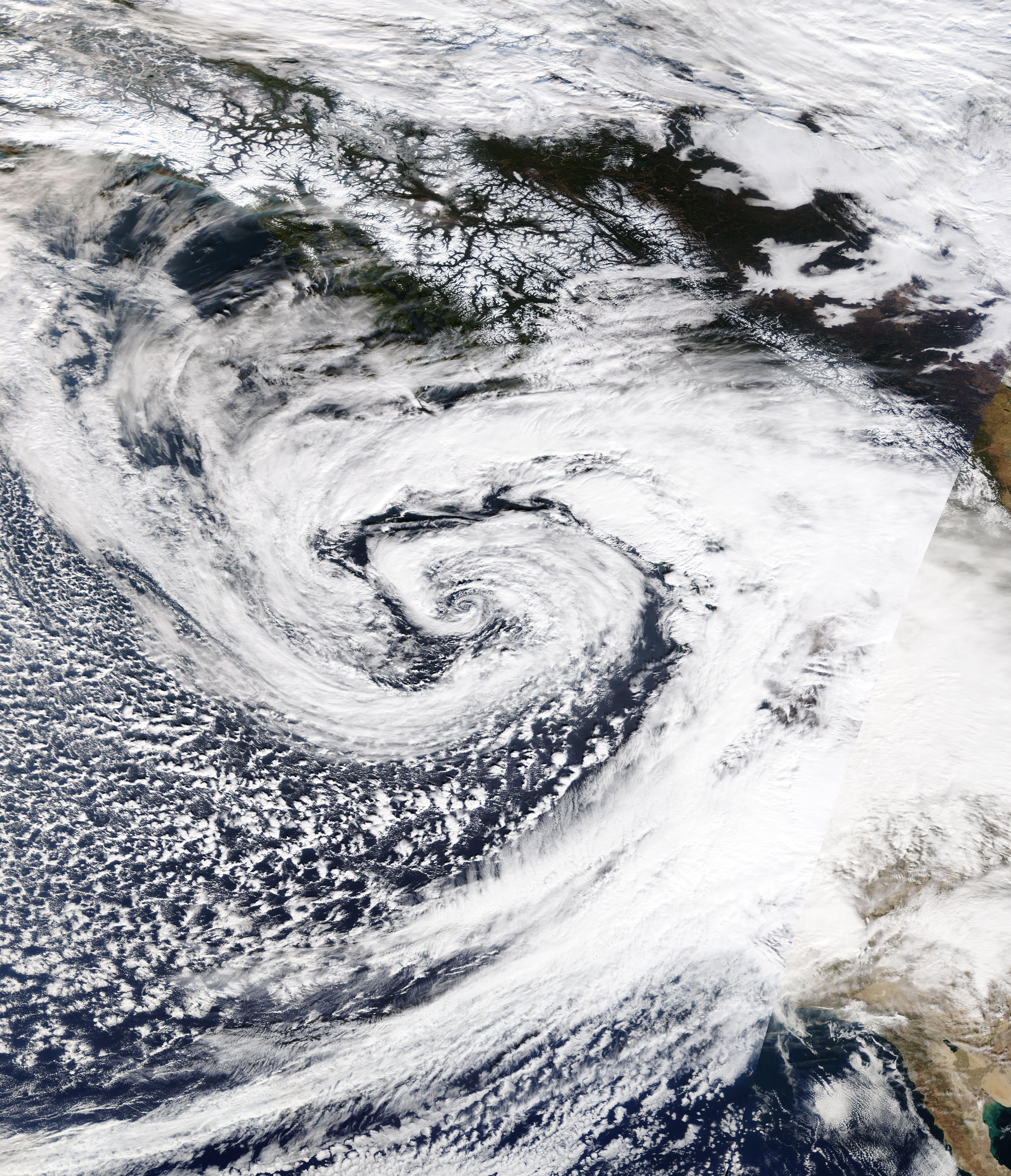
- Satellite image of the bomb cyclone several hours prior to reaching its peak intensity off the Pacific Northwest, on October 24, 2021

Meteorological history
- Formed: October 19, 2021
- Dissipated: October 26, 2021

Extratropical cyclone
- Highest winds: 120 km/h (75 mph)
- Highest gusts: 256 km/h (159 mph)
- Lowest pressure: 942 hPa (mbar); 27.82 inHg
- Max. rainfall: 16.56 inches (421 mm) of rain at Middle Peak, Sierra Nevada, California
- Max. snowfall: 42 inches (110 cm) of snow at Mount Rose, Nevada

Overall effects
- Fatalities: At least 2
- Damage: >$400 million (2021 USD)
- Areas affected: Russian Far East, Japan, Alaska, Western United States, Western Canada
- Power outages: >370,500
- Part of the 2021–22 North American winter

An extremely powerful extratropical cyclone began in late October 2021 in the Northeast Pacific and struck the Western United States and Western Canada. The storm was the third and the most powerful cyclone in a series of powerful storms that struck the region within a week. The cyclone tapped into a large atmospheric river and underwent explosive intensification, becoming a bomb cyclone on October 24. The bomb cyclone had a minimum central pressure of 942 millibars (27.8 inHg) at its peak, making it the most powerful cyclone recorded in the Northeast Pacific. The system had severe impacts across Western North America, before dissipating on October 26. The storm shattered multiple pressure records across parts of the Pacific Northwest. Additionally, the bomb cyclone was the most powerful storm on record to strike the region, in terms of minimum central pressure. The bomb cyclone brought powerful gale-force winds and flooding to portions of Western North America. At its height, the storm cut the power to over 370,500 customers across the Western U.S. and British Columbia. The storm killed at least two people; damage from the storm was estimated at several hundred million dollars (2021 USD). The bomb cyclone was compared to the Columbus Day Storm of 1962, in terms of ferocity.

== Meteorological history ==
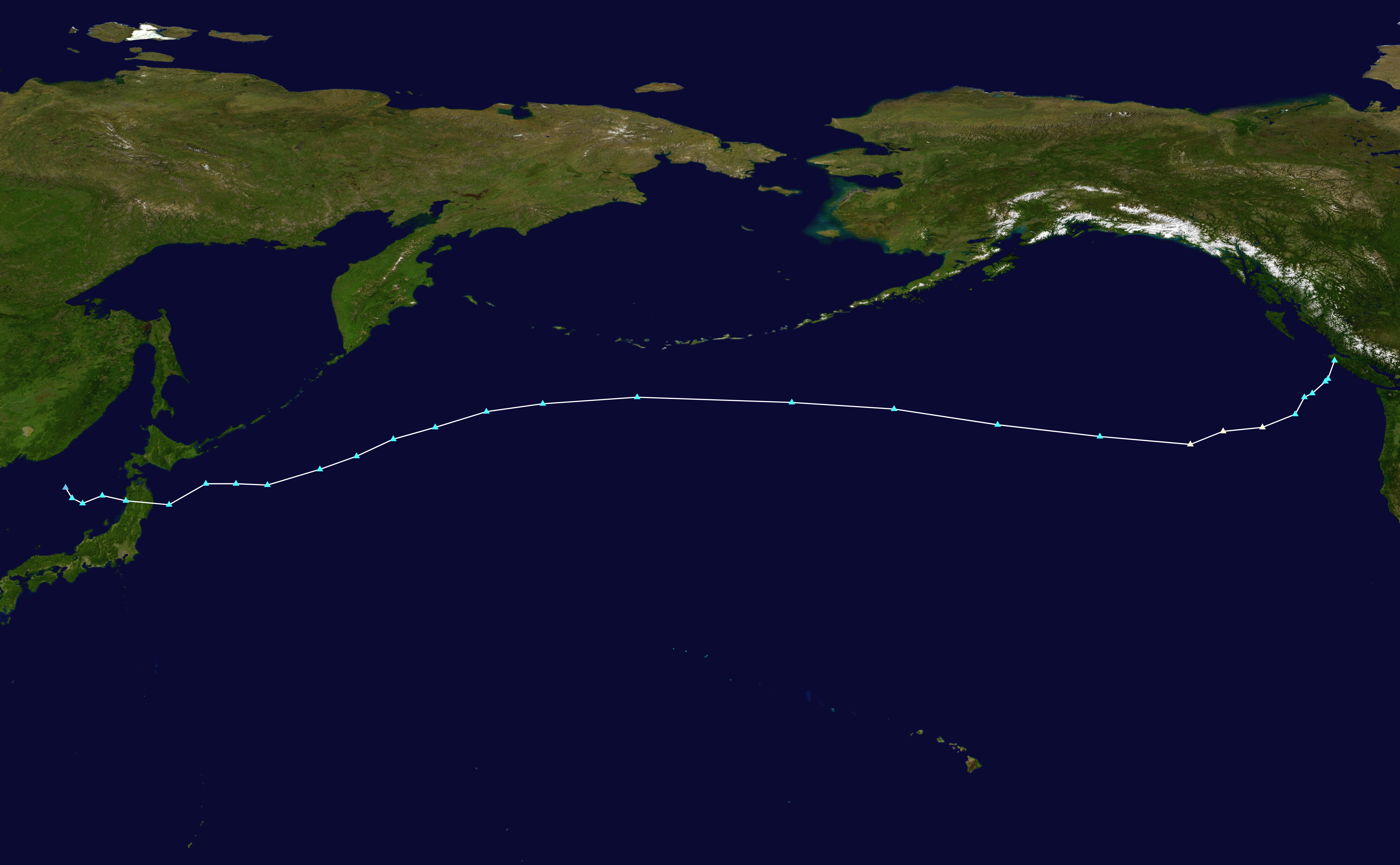
Map plotting the storm's track and intensity, according to the Saffir–Simpson scale Map key Saffir–Simpson scale Tropical depression (≤38 mph, ≤62 km/h) Tropical storm (39–73 mph, 63–118 km/h) Category 1 (74–95 mph, 119–153 km/h) Category 2 (96–110 mph, 154–177 km/h) Category 3 (111–129 mph, 178–208 km/h) Category 4 (130–156 mph, 209–251 km/h) Category 5 (≥157 mph, ≥252 km/h) Unknown Storm type Tropical cyclone Subtropical cyclone Extratropical cyclone, remnant low, tropical disturbance, or monsoon depression

In late October 2021, a Pineapple express, an atmospheric river that often affects Western North America, opened into the Pacific Northwest, channeling a series of three powerful cyclones into the region. On October 21, the first storm, the extratropical remnant of Severe Tropical Storm Namtheun reached the Northeast Pacific, undergoing explosive cyclogenesis and developing into a bomb cyclone on October 21, reaching an extratropical peak of 951 millibars (28.1 inHg), while situated off the coast of the Pacific Northwest. Namtheun's remnant brought heavy rain and powerful winds to the Pacific Northwest during this time. Afterward, the system curved northward and then north-northwestward, while gradually weakening, before being absorbed into another approaching extratropical cyclone from the west, late on October 22. This second cyclone also developed into a powerful storm, peaking at 970 millibars (29 inHg) in the Gulf of Alaska; however, the system curved northwestward and stayed out at sea.

On October 19, a third extratropical cyclone developed over the Northwest Pacific, over the Sea of Japan. Over the next several days, the system quickly moved eastward across the North Pacific, moving into the Northeast Pacific on October 23. Soon afterward, the system began to quickly intensify while slowing down, though at 00:00 UTC on October 24, the cyclone underwent a center relocation, with the storm's center shifting slightly eastward. The system quickly underwent explosive intensification, with the storm's central pressure dropping 21 millibars (0.62 inHg) in just 12 hours on October 24, from 964 millibars (28.5 inHg) to 943 millibars (27.8 inHg), becoming a powerful bomb cyclone as it moved towards the Pacific Northwest. A "bomb cyclone" is a powerful cyclone that undergoes extreme intensification, with the central pressure dropping at least 24 millibars (0.71 inHg) within a 24-hour period. Around this time, the system's rainbands began moving ashore in Western North America, bringing severe impacts to the region. The system ended up triggering a Category 5 Atmospheric River event, the highest rating on a scale devised by the Scripps Institute of Oceanography in 2019 for ranking the severity of atmospheric river storms, from 1 to 5. Later that day, at 18:00 UTC, the storm reached its peak intensity off the coast of the Pacific Northwest, with a minimum central pressure of 942 millibars (27.8 inHg), making it the most powerful cyclone on record to strike Western North America, in terms of pressure. The storm's central pressure had dropped 46 millibars (1.4 inHg) over a 24-hour period, from 988 millibars (29.2 inHg) to 942 millibars (27.8 inHg). Afterward, the cyclone gradually weakened as it slowly moved towards the coast of British Columbia, with a new low developing over California, as the eastern portion of the system broke off and became a new storm. Early on October 26, the cyclone rapidly weakened while making landfall in British Columbia, before being absorbed into a larger approaching extratropical cyclone to the west, several hours later, at 09:00 UTC that day. However, the new storm that broke off from the bomb cyclone continued moving eastward across the United States for the next several days, before developing into a powerful cyclone that struck the Eastern United States around the Halloween weekend, producing 3.01 in (76 mm) of rain in Baltimore, and resulting in the George Washington Parkway shutting down.

== Preparation, impact, and records ==
In anticipation of the storm's impacts, the National Weather Service (NWS) issued Flash flood watches and warnings across portions of Central California, including the San Francisco Bay Area. The NWS also issued a winter storm warning for parts of the Sierra Nevada through October 26. The NWS issued evacuation orders for residents around the Santa Cruz Mountains, due to concerns of debris flows from the burn scar of the CZU Lightning Complex fires in 2020. They also warned residents near the burn scars around Sacramento to be ready to evacuate, and to take shelter in the highest part of their homes if they were unable to evacuate in the event of an evacuation order. In San Francisco, city authorities sent text alerts to residents, warning them of flooded streets and downed trees and power lines. All of downtown San Rafael was closed to non-essential traffic, as the roads flooded.

The hardest-hit areas were in Northern and Central California, and in southern Oregon. In Central California, the bomb cyclone brought several inches of rain to multiple regions, ending a 212-day streak with no measurable precipitation in the region and also effectively ending the state's wildfire season that year. The storm channeled an atmospheric river into Central California and moved slower than expected, triggering flooding across the Bay Area and flooding multiple highways. Downtown San Francisco recorded 4.02 inches (102 mm) of rain on October 24, making it the wettest October day recorded in the city's history. In downtown Sacramento, a 24-hour rainfall total of 5.44 inches (138 mm) of rain was recorded on the morning of October 25, breaking the previous record of 5.28 inches (134 mm) set in 1880. On October 24, Blue Canyon recorded 10.40 inches (264 mm) of rain, and Santa Rosa recorded 7.83 inches (199 mm) of rain; these measurements broke the records for the single-wettest day recorded in both areas. In Marin County, Mount Tamalpais recorded over 16 inches (410 mm) of rain. Central California saw multiple areas record rainfall totals of at least 5–10 inches (130–250 mm) of rain, with a maximum total of 16.56 inches (421 mm) of rain recorded at Middle Peak, in the Sierra Nevada. The storm dumped over a few feet of snow across the Sierra Nevada. Rainfall from the storm resulted in flash flooding and mudslides in areas with wildfire burn scars, including a landslide that forced the closure of SR 70 in both directions. In Placer County, I-80 was closed in both directions. In San Rafael, many roads were submerged under 2 feet (0.61 m) of water, and in some parts of the city, the water level reached waist-height; and there were over 330 calls for firefighter or police assistance, which was four times the average amount. Multiple reservoirs experienced a significant increase in their water levels during the storm. Lake Oroville's water level rose by about 23 feet (7.0 m), though this was still about 80 feet (24 m) below its level in October 2020. About 45 miles (72 km) south of San Francisco, the heavy rain affected an NFL game at Levi's Stadium, between the Indianapolis Colts and the San Francisco 49ers. A tornado warning was also issued for the area just west of Wasco, on the afternoon of October 25, marking the first tornado warning issued in the San Joaquin Valley in 592 days. However, no tornadoes touch downs were confirmed from the storm. Large portions of the state experienced winds of 40–60 mph (64–97 km/h) or higher. Multiple locations in the Sierra Nevada experienced wind gusts well over 100 mph (160 km/h). On October 24, Squaw Mountain reported a wind gust of 141 mph (227 km/h), Kirkwood Mountain reported a gust of 112 mph (180 km/h), and Mammoth Mountain reported a maximum wind gust of 159 mph (256 km/h). In California, over 160,000 homes and businesses lost power. The storm and its intensity was linked to climate change, with some scientists predicting that a warmer climate would likely make such powerful storms more frequent, along with more severe droughts. This helped give California their 4th wettest October on record.

In Reno, Nevada, 2.59 inches (66 mm) of rain was recorded, from October 24–25, just short of the October daily record of 2.65 inches (67 mm) set in 2010. At Reno–Tahoe International Airport, a total of 1.03 inches (26 mm) of rain was recorded on October 25, breaking the daily rainfall record for October. A maximum snowfall total of 42 inches (110 cm) was recorded at Mount Rose. Winnemucca recorded over 2 inches (5.1 cm) of rain, which is more rainfall than the area normally sees in October and November combined. This helped give Nevada their 5th wettest October on record.

The storm brought heavy rain, thunderstorms, and powerful winds to Oregon. Multiple downed trees were reported in the Portland metropolitan area, and a small outdoor greenhouse was destroyed in Eastwood Elementary School, in Hillsboro. Winds from the storm cut the power to over 28,000 customers in the state.

In Washington state, powerful winds from the bomb cyclone toppled a tree onto a car, killing a mother and her son inside. Amtrak's Coast Starlight train was stuck south of Kelso, due to downed trees blocking the tracks. Winds from the storm gusting up to 61 mph (98 km/h) resulted in power outages for over 170,000 customers, around the Seattle metropolitan area and around Puget Sound. The highest winds recorded in Washington state were 85 mph (137 km/h) gusts on the Long Beach Peninsula.

The storm also generated 40-foot (12 m) waves off the coast of the Pacific Northwest.

In British Columbia, winds from the storm cut the power to over 12,500 customers, including 5,500 customers on Vancouver Island. Ferry trips were also cancelled, due to the bad weather. On October 23, large waves produced by the storm caused 40 containers on the Zim Kingston cargo ship to be thrown overboard, about 5 miles (8.0 km) off the coast of Victoria, some of which then ignited a chemical fire. The storm prevented firefighters from dealing with the chemical fire until after the passage of the storm.

The bomb cyclone was considered the most powerful storm to strike the Western United States in 26 years, in addition to being the most intense storm recorded in the Northeast Pacific. The cyclone was estimated to have caused at least several hundred million dollars in damages, on the U.S. West Coast. The bomb cyclone was compared to the Columbus Day Storm of 1962, in terms of ferocity and impacts. While both systems were powerful cyclones that had severe effects on the Pacific Northwest, the October 2021 cyclone was the more intense system of the two, but the Columbus Day Storm tracked closer to the coast than the later storm did, which made the former more severe than the latter.

== See also ==
- Great Gale of 1880
- Columbus Day Storm of 1962
- Great Coastal Gale of 2007
- January 2008 North American storm complex
- January 2010 North American winter storms
- October 2010 North American storm complex
- December 2010 North American blizzard
- November 2011 Bering Sea cyclone
- January 2013 Northwest Pacific cyclone
- March 2014 North American winter storm
- November 2014 Bering Sea cyclone
- 2017 California floods
- January 31 – February 3, 2021 nor'easter – Another powerful cyclone that struck the West Coast of the U.S. and triggered extensive atmospheric river flooding there, before later striking the East Coast
- Pacific Northwest windstorm
- November 2024 Northeast Pacific bomb cyclone
