= February 13, 1979, windstorm =

Windstorm in the northwestern United States and southwestern Canada

Map of the storm; most of the peak gusts are recorded by official stations

The February 13, 1979, windstorm was a natural phenomenon which happened in the West Coast region of Canada and the Pacific Northwest. During the early morning, an intense wave cyclone moved across southern Vancouver Island in British Columbia. South of the low center, a strong atmospheric pressure gradient was carried across Washington, with associated high winds. With a cold airflow moving toward the northeast interacting with the high terrain of the Olympic Mountains, a lee low developed east of the Olympics. The mesoscale low caused a particularly intense pressure gradient across the Kitsap Peninsula region.

== Wind velocity ==
At 6 mb (millibars) over 8 miles, the geostrophic wind potential easily exceeded 200 knots (roughly translating to about 100 knots in a geostrophic flow over the Earth's rough surface, or 115 mph). As reported by the crew of the Hood Canal Bridge, average winds reached at least 80 mph out of the south, with gusts in the triple digits. The wind velocities were cross-checked on two different anemometers at the bridge control tower.

== Damage ==
Extensive damage to trees on surrounding private timberland corroborated the extreme intensity of the tempest. The pressure of winds and waves on the Hood Canal Bridge stressed the structure enough to cause catastrophic failure. It is suspected that a severe list in the bridge exposed pontoon access hatches to the waves, which then tore the covers loose allowing water to enter the flotation devices, causing sections to sink. It took nearly three years and over $140 million to rebuild the bridge.

== See also ==
- Storm
