= Great Gale of 1880 =

1880 winter storm in the Northwest United States

Meteorological history
- Formed: January 1880
- Dissipated: After January 19, 1880

Extratropical cyclone
- Lowest pressure: 955 hPa (mbar); 28.20 inHg

Winter storm
- Max. snowfall: Unknown

Overall effects
- Fatalities: >=5
- Damage: At least several million dollars (1880 USD)
- Areas affected: British Columbia, Pacific Northwest

The Great Gale of 1880 was an intense extratropical cyclone (possibly deeper than 955 millibars or 28.20 inHg) that impacted the Northwest United States on January 9, 1880.

The greatest snowstorm, and perhaps overall worst storm in SW Washington and NW Oregon history, was that dubbed the ‘Storm King’ event of January 9, 1880.... Little data is available for the so-called ‘Storm King’ of January 1880, but it appears the storm center came ashore just south of Astoria, Oregon, on January 9th when a barometric pressure of 28.45” was registered in the town. Portland bottomed out at 28.56.

Winds gusted over 70 miles per hour (61 kn) in Portland, probably exceeding 100 miles per hour (87 kn) along the Pacific coast and causing extensive damage and several deaths. Enormous damage was done to the forests of both Oregon and Washington (where a few days earlier over five feet of snow had fallen in Seattle). Great tree losses were reported; outside of Portland, 500 to 600 trees were blown down over just 10 miles of railroad tracks.

Gusts of an estimated 138 miles per hour (222 km/h) destroyed buildings, barns, and fences. The storm blew a three-masted schooner onto the beach at Coos Bay where it broke in two.

== Newspaper reports and anecdotes ==
On January 19, 1880, a letter to The Daily Oregonian from an Astoria resident reads,

From the graphic, and, in some cases, the heart-rending accounts published in the Oregonian descriptive of the disasters resulting from the late severe windstorms in other portions of the state and the neighboring territory, it would appear that our town and county suffered less injury than almost any other.

Parts of the lower Columbia seem to have experienced a blizzard, as related from Westport:

On the 9th at 2 o-clock P.M., a storm of snow and wind set in and continued for two hours with all the fury of a hurricane.

As documented in the Morning Oregonian, Polk County reported "the heaviest wind storm ever known in these parts" and the Dallas Itemizer said "The storm of Friday was considered very severe here at that time, but since the reports of the havoc in other places, we have concluded that we had no storm here to speak of."

An article printed on January 12, 1880, noted,

The storm near the mouth of the Columbia seems to have been entirely distinct from the one which swept through the Willamette Valley, and scarcely as severe or prolonged. The wind was from the northwest, and did not commence to blow violently until nearly 2 o'clock Friday afternoon.

In the Fort Clatsop area along the Lewis and Clark River, it was reported

The wind changed suddenly to the west, and while the trees were heavily laden with snow, struck the forest with terrific effect.

In contrast to the north coast, a letter from Newport printed in The Oregonian on January 17, 1880, reported

We have just experienced one of the severest gales; nothing like it has occurred since the settlement of the bay. It was southeast, lasted about five hours, and was terrible in force… The tide rose seven feet higher than was ever known; nearly all the old wharves are taken away.

There was no snowfall on the coastal hills around Newport, but "several miles from here it is five inches, and gradually deepens as you go east. Said to be 18 inches deep at Siletz, Oregon." Further south, it was reported on January 19 that Gardiner was struck with a "perfect gale" that threw large breakers ashore and shoved water into a warehouse, threatening livestock. "The rain came down in torrents," and the Umpqua River and Smith River flooded high, adding to the wet mess. "The storm raged with great violence at Coos Bay." The three-masted schooner Emma Utter dragged anchor and was smashed ashore.

The powerful gale struck much of the Willamette Valley in the mid to late morning. For example, "the heaviest windstorm ever known in these parts" struck Monmouth, in Polk County, at about 11 am. The strong winds also struck the city of Corvallis at 11 am, with the gale lasting until about 3 pm, and started around 9 am in Blodgett in the coast range to the west. In Portland, the powerful wind began at 11 am, and lasted until about 2:30 pm.

== See also ==
- Extratropical cyclone
- Windstorm
- Columbus Day Storm of 1962
- Hanukkah Eve windstorm of 2006
- Great Coastal Gale of 2007
- 2011 Bering Sea superstorm
- November 2014 Bering Sea cyclone
- SS Alpena lost in October 1880
- List of storms on the Great Lakes
