= November 2024 Northeast Pacific bomb cyclone =

North American Bomb Cyclone in 2024

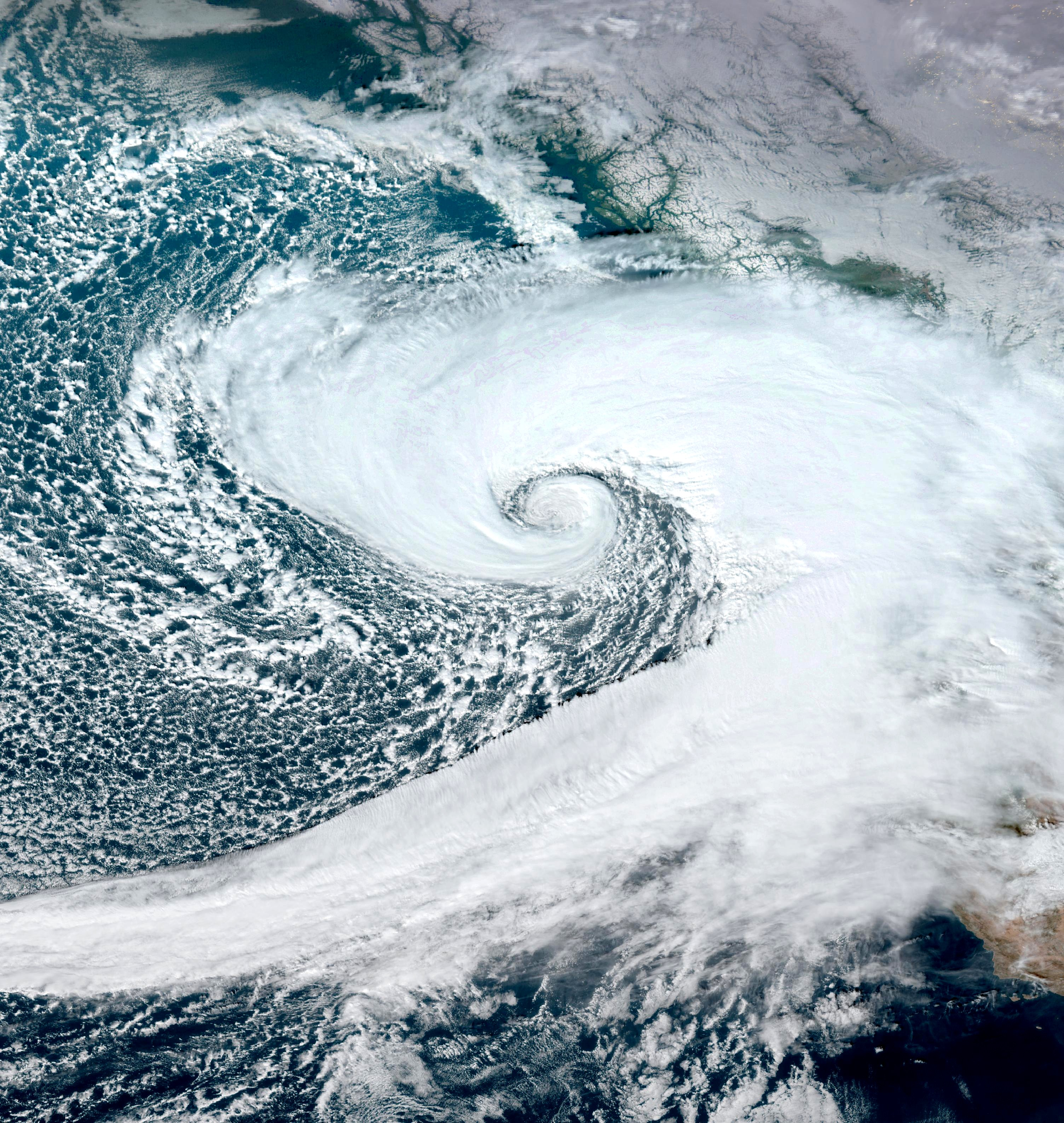
- Picture of bomb cyclone off the Pacific Northwest coast on the afternoon of November 19, 2024

Meteorological history
- Formed: c. November 18, 2024

Extratropical cyclone
- Highest gusts: 101 miles per hour (163 km/h) (Note: Observed offshore in Canadian waters. Maximum wind on land was 99 mph.)
- Lowest pressure: 942 hPa (mbar); 27.82 inHg
- Max. rainfall: 22.57 inches (573 mm)

Overall effects
- Fatalities: ≥4
- Areas affected: British Columbia, Washington, Oregon, California
- Power outages: ≥953,000
- Part of the 2024–25 North American winter

A powerful extratropical cyclone developed c. November 18, 2024, in the Northeast Pacific and struck the Western United States and Western Canada. The storm underwent bombogenesis, rapidly dropping its central pressure to a record-tying level of 942 millibars (27.8 inHg). This storm was the first of two storm systems to impact the U.S. West Coast during a three-day period. The storm was associated with an atmospheric river that dropped large amounts of rain in Oregon and California. The Weather Prediction Center (WPC) issued a rare high risk of excessive rainfall in parts of Northern California, warning of "life-threatening flooding".

== Impact ==
=== British Columbia ===
Map plotting the storm's track and intensity, according to the Saffir–Simpson scale Map key Saffir–Simpson scale Tropical depression (≤38 mph, ≤62 km/h) Tropical storm (39–73 mph, 63–118 km/h) Category 1 (74–95 mph, 119–153 km/h) Category 2 (96–110 mph, 154–177 km/h) Category 3 (111–129 mph, 178–208 km/h) Category 4 (130–156 mph, 209–251 km/h) Category 5 (≥157 mph, ≥252 km/h) Unknown Storm type Tropical cyclone Subtropical cyclone Extratropical cyclone, remnant low, tropical disturbance, or monsoon depression

In British Columbia, Canada, over 200,000 customers of BC Hydro were left without power. Highways 4, 14, 18, and 28—all on Vancouver Island—were closed due to debris and downed power lines. On Sartine Island, a gust of 159 kilometres per hour (99 mph) was reported.

=== Washington ===
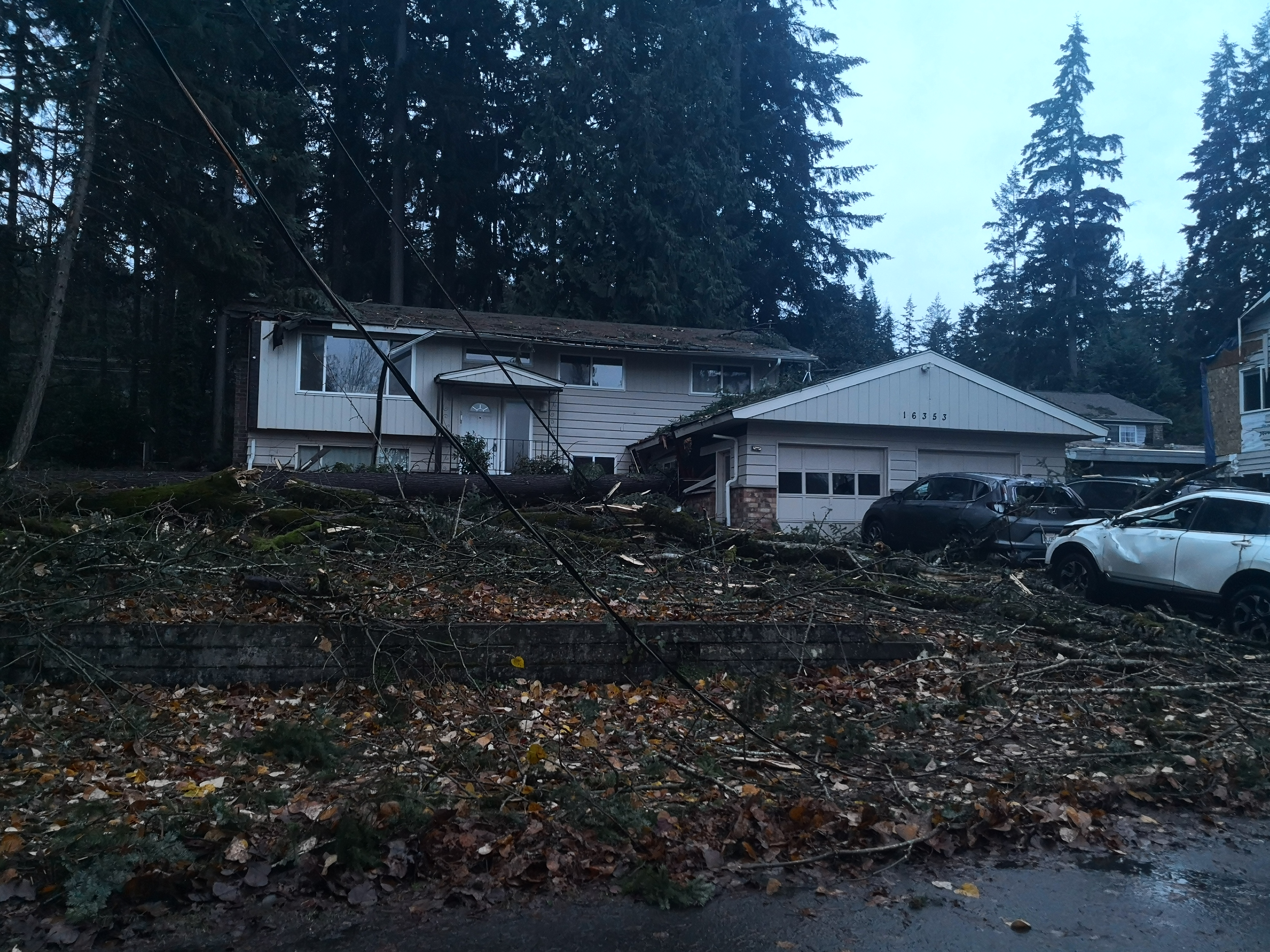
Downed electrical power distribution line (left), garage and vehicles dented by falling trees in Cougar Hills, near Eastgate, Bellevue

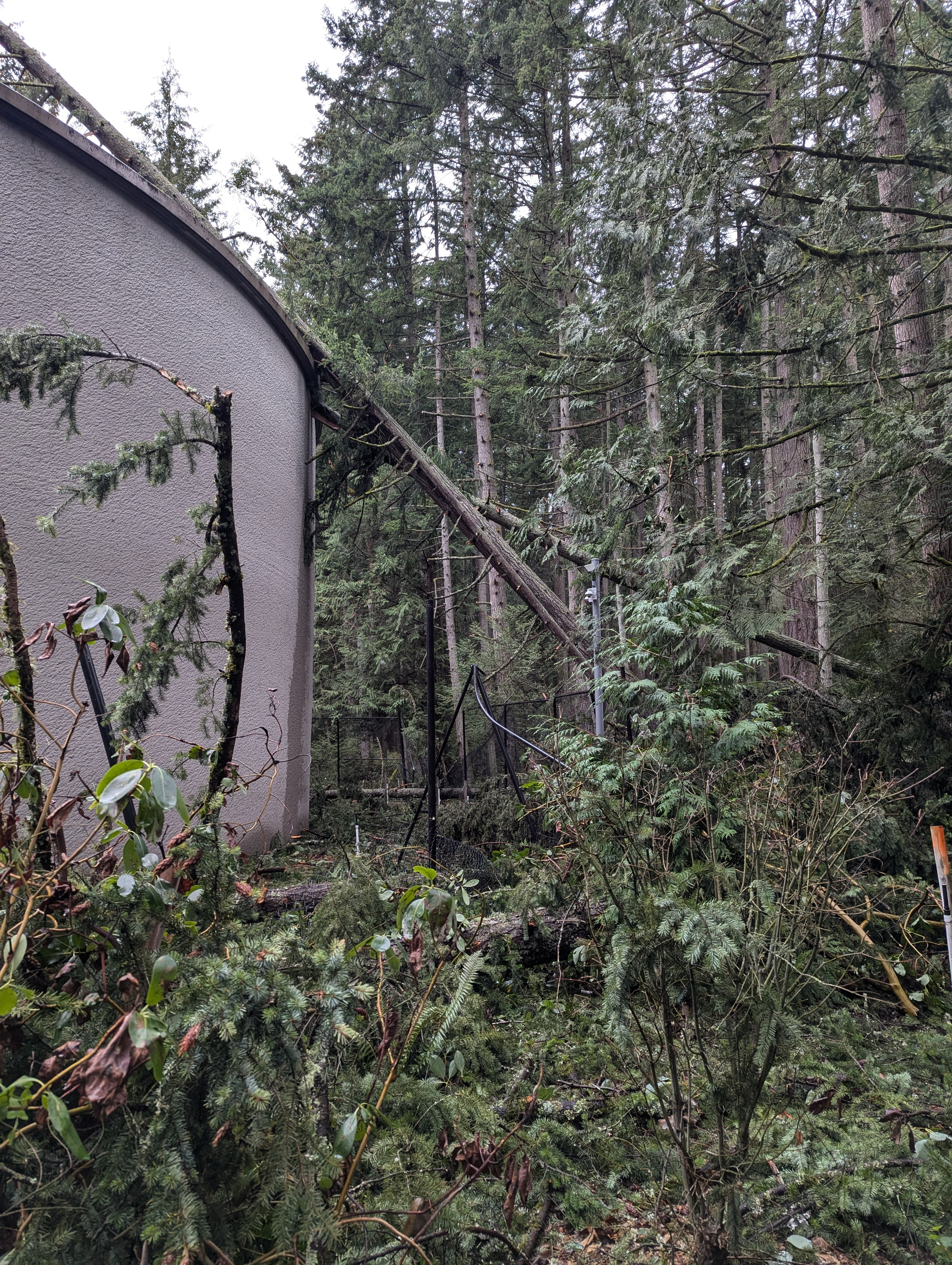
Fallen trees and damaged infrastructure in Bridle Trails State Park

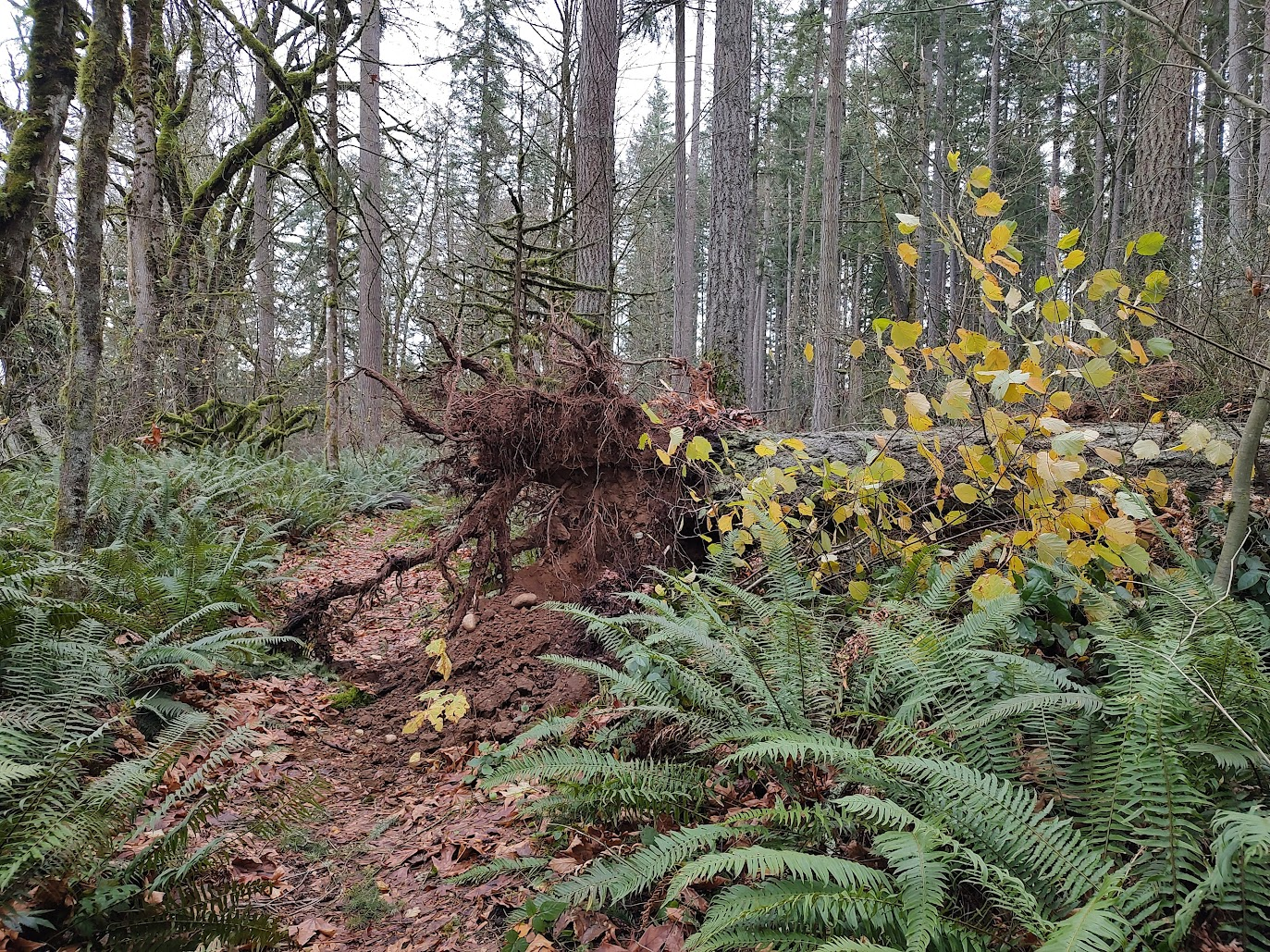
Tree at Green River College in Auburn uprooted by bomb cyclone winds.

Around 650,000 people were left without power across western Washington. In Lynnwood, Washington, a woman in her 50s was killed by a large tree that fell onto a homeless encampment. In the Bridle Trails neighborhood of Bellevue, a woman was killed when a tree hit a home. A gust of 77 miles per hour (124 km/h) was reported at Sunrise in Mount Rainier National Park, while 74 miles per hour (119 km/h) gusts were recorded in Enumclaw. A tornado warning was issued near Tokeland due to a waterspout being spotted offshore.

The Eastside region of King County was the most heavily affected area of the Puget Sound region. The area's electricity provider, Puget Sound Energy (PSE), reported that more than 400 miles (640 km) of its transmission lines were impacted by high winds and it had contacted line crews from outside of the state to assist. PSE repaired 47 of its 49 substations by November 23, but 66,000 customers still lacked service. The Snohomish County Public Utility District had over 135,000 customers in Snohomish County and Camano Island without power; by November 25, it had restored service to 99% of customers. Four northbound lanes of Interstate 405 were closed by a tree that fell into the highway near the Interstate 90 interchange in Bellevue. The National Weather Service weather radio transmitter on Cougar Mountain near Issaquah went off the air during the storm.

An Amtrak Cascades train struck a fallen tree in Silvana, between Stanwood and Marysville, at around 7:50 p.m. The tree pierced the locomotive's windshield but did not seriously injure the engineer or anyone onboard; service was temporarily disrupted while the damaged locomotive was towed away. Amtrak cancelled several Empire Builder and Coast Starlight trips through the region in anticipation of the storm. Link light rail service in the Seattle area was also disrupted by power outages; the northernmost section of the 1 Line was closed for several hours on November 19 and replaced by bus shuttles between Northgate and Lynnwood City Center stations. The entire 2 Line between Bellevue and Redmond was suspended on November 20 and replaced by buses. Washington State Ferries cancelled several sailings on its Port Townsend–Coupeville ferry route due to high winds across the Admiralty Inlet.

=== Oregon ===
Wind gusts up to 73 miles per hour was recorded in Oregon at the Yaquina Bay Bridge in Newport. Corbett, Eugene, and Florence recorded peak gusts of 50, 52, and 67 miles per hour (80, 84, and 108 km/h), respectively. Winds of 45 miles per hour (72 km/h) were recorded at Portland International Airport. Approximately 10,000 people in the Portland metropolitan area lost power.

=== California ===
The cyclone was associated with an atmospheric river reaching California from the tropics.

Near the Oregon-California border, Interstate 5 was closed due to heavy snow. In addition, the Avenue of the Giants was closed amid flooding. On Mattole Road in Humboldt County, a 98 mph gust was recorded, and at Crescent City Harbor in Del Norte County, an 80 mph gust was recorded. Over 430 flights were delayed and 60 cancelled at San Francisco International Airport. 23,000 power outages were reported in California. Two people were reported dead in Sonoma County, with the first being found dead in a creek and the second in a flooded vehicle.

== Aftermath ==
In January 2025, as Governor Jay Inslee was preparing to leave office, Washington applied for federal aid to cover an estimated US$34 million in damage, a figure jointly estimated by the state and FEMA. In April, FEMA denied the request in a letter that gave no reason. A spokesperson for the Washington Military Department said it was the first time "in recent memory" that the state had met the criteria for public assistance and been denied. Governor Bob Ferguson appealed in May, and FEMA reaffirmed the denial in a letter dated June 19, reported the next day.

According to a KUOW analysis of FEMA records, between February and June 2025 President Donald Trump denied 6 of 10 major-disaster requests from Democratic governors and approved 14 of 15 from Republican governors; the lone Republican denial included Arkansas, whose request was later approved on appeal.

== See also ==
- Great Coastal Gale of 2007
- Hanukkah Eve windstorm of 2006
- October 2021 Northeast Pacific bomb cyclone
- Pacific Northwest windstorm
