= Charlene Strong =

American civil rights activist

Charlene D. Strong (born May 6, 1963) is an American civil rights advocate and a former member of the Washington State Human Rights Commission.

== Biography ==
Strong began her advocacy career in 2006. In December of that year, Strong's partner of nine years, Kate Fleming, died suddenly when a flash flood trapped her inside the flooded basement of her Madison Valley, Seattle, recording studio during the Hanukkah Eve Wind Storm. Arriving at the hospital, Strong was initially prevented from joining Fleming, despite their long partnership, because Washington State did not recognize domestic partners.

In January 2007, she testified before the Washington State Senate Committee in support of a bill creating a statewide Domestic Partnership Registry. In April 2007, she stood beside Governor Christine Gregoire as that domestic partnership bill was signed into law. The Governor opened her remarks by retelling Strong's story. In February 2009, Gregoire appointed Strong to the Washington State Human Rights Commission. Strong's second term expired in 2017.

Strong is also a co-producer of the film For My Wife..., which tells the story of how Strong became an advocate for equality following Fleming's death. The film won the Best Documentary prize at the 2008 Seattle Lesbian and Gay Film Festival.

Strong works closely with Equal Rights Washington and has endowed a fellowship at the National Gay and Lesbian Task force in Washington, D.C.
