= 2006 storms in Vancouver =

Weather events in Vancouver, Canada

The 2006 storms in Vancouver were a series of storms beginning with the remnants of Typhoon Cimaron November 5 and then followed by another on November 15 that caused landslides into Vancouver's three main reservoirs. This led to the water system becoming contaminated far beyond the legal safety limit and forced the city to implement a boil water advisory for all of the city's two-million residents for more than a week—the largest such advisory in Canadian history. The advisory affected the local food industry, forcing supermarkets and restaurants to stop selling produce which couldn't be safely washed, and causing the majority of the city's many coffee shops to close. Although no dangerous bacteria levels were observed, the water was still considered unclean and unsafe to drink, wash vegetables or brush teeth with, without boiling it first for at least 1 minute. Bottled water was in high demand and became scarce in many areas. The storms were caused by an Aleutian Low's steering current, which allowed low pressure areas from the central subtropics of the North Pacific Ocean to track northeast and near areas of British Columbia, sometimes bringing more than 100 mm (4 in) of rain from each low.

As the low pressure systems were slowly replaced by an Arctic ridge, temperatures on November 25 dipped to −12 °C (10 °F) at Vancouver International Airport and the cities of Metro Vancouver and the Fraser Valley were hit with a series of heavy snowstorms. The highest recorded one-day snowfall from the event was the 44.1 cm (17.4 in) which occurred in Abbotsford. The short burst of heavy snow produced long traffic delays and widespread school closures.

Three weeks later on December 14 came the Hanukkah Eve windstorm, breaking and uprooting around 10,000 trees in Stanley Park next to downtown Vancouver. At its peak, BC Hydro reported that over 250,000 customers were without power.

== See also ==
- Climate of Vancouver
- Typhoon Freda -1962
- Global storm activity of 2006
- Great Coastal Gale of 2007
- January 2012 Pacific Northwest snowstorm
