= Climate of Vancouver =

Burrard Inlet (Vancouver Harbour, 1991–2020)

Climate chart (precipitation, max. and min. temperature)
| J | F | M | A | M | J | J | A | S | O | N | D |
| 237 7 3 | 117 8 3 | 163 11 5 | 118 14 7 | 73 18 10 | 66 20 13 | 44 23 15 | 49 23 15 | 71 19 12 | 157 14 9 | 245 10 5 | 200 7 3 |
- █ Average max. and min. temperatures in °C
- █ Precipitation totals in mm
Imperial conversion
| J | F | M | A | M | J | J | A | S | O | N | D |
| 9.3 45 38 | 4.6 47 38 | 6.4 51 40 | 4.6 57 44 | 2.9 64 50 | 2.6 68 55 | 1.7 73 59 | 1.9 73 59 | 2.8 67 54 | 6.2 57 47 | 9.7 49 42 | 7.9 45 38 |
- █ Average max. and min. temperatures in °F
- █ Precipitation totals in inches

The city of Vancouver, located in British Columbia, Canada, has a temperate oceanic climate (Köppen climate classification Cfb). Its summer months are typically dry and moderately warm, while the rest of the year is rainy, especially between October and March. The region has frequent cloudy and overcast skies during late fall, winter, and spring.

Like the rest of the British Columbia Coast, the city is tempered by the Alaska Current, which has its origins in the milder North Pacific current and is also, to an extent, sheltered by the mountains of Vancouver Island to the west.

== General climate ==
The climatology of Vancouver applies to the entire Greater Vancouver region and not just to the City of Vancouver itself. While Vancouver's coastal location serves to moderate its temperatures, sea breezes and mountainous terrain make Greater Vancouver a region of microclimates, with local variations in weather sometimes being more exaggerated than those experienced in other coastal areas.

Predicting precipitation in the Greater Vancouver area is particularly complex. It is a rule of thumb that for every rise of 100 m (330 ft) in elevation, there is an additional 100 mm (3.9 in) (30 mm [1.2 in] per 30 m [100 ft]) of precipitation, so places such as the District of North Vancouver in the North Shore Mountains get more rain. Snow is problematic for meteorologists to predict due to temperatures remaining close to freezing during snow events.

=== Temperatures ===
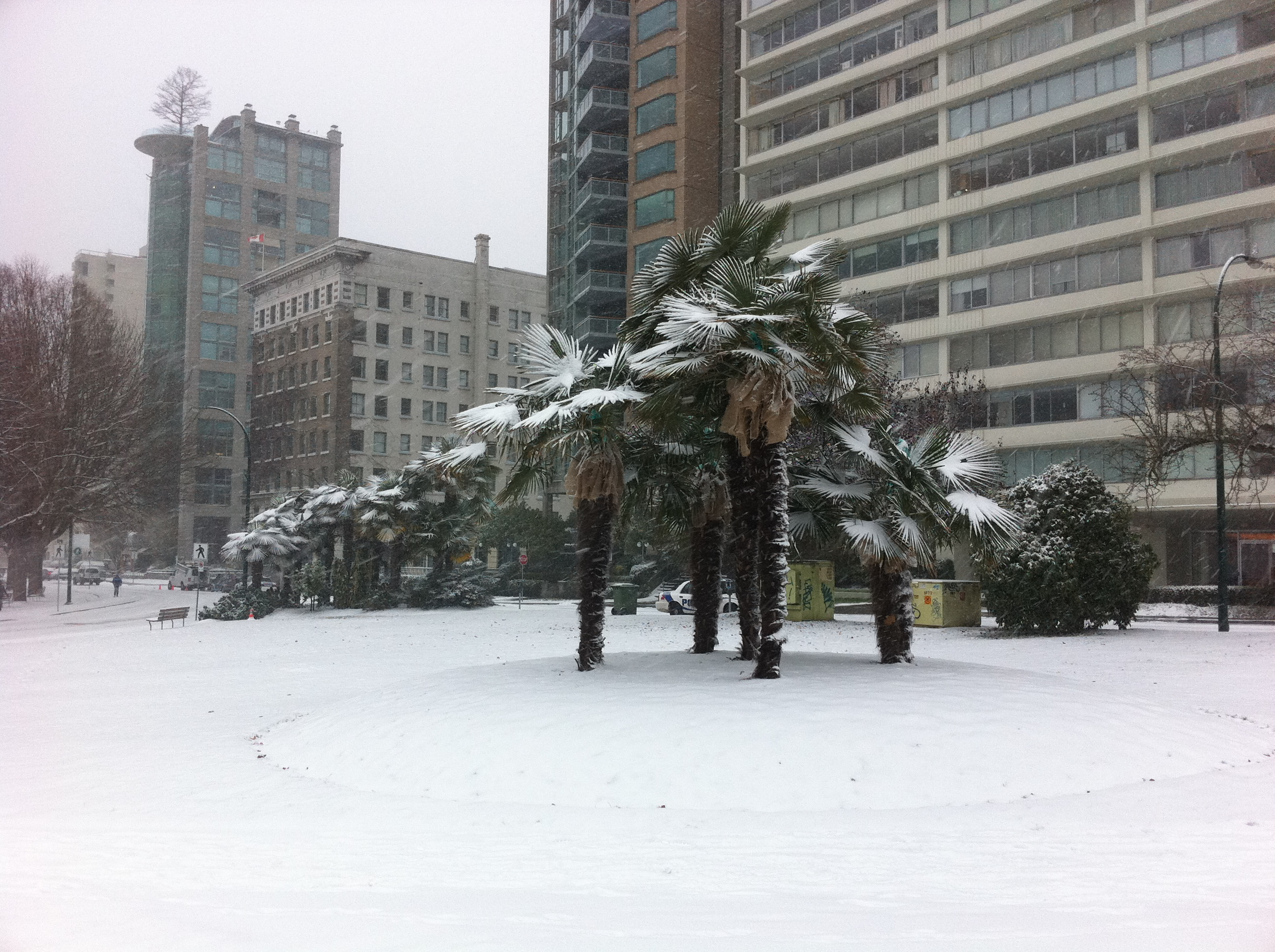
Windmill palm trees in Vancouver. Some subtropical plants can survive high west coast latitudes in oceanic climates.

The average annual temperature in Vancouver is 11.0 °C (51.8 °F) downtown and 10.4 °C (50.7 °F) at Vancouver International Airport in Richmond. This is one of the warmest in Canada. Greater Vancouver is in USDA plant hardiness zone 8, similar to other coastal or near-coastal cities such as Seattle, Portland, Amsterdam, and London, as well as places such as Dallas, Texas, and Raleigh, North Carolina, far to the south (however, these locations have far more growing degree days due to their hot summers). The semi-mild climate sustains plants such as the Windmill Palm, known to be the hardiest palm tree in the world. Vancouver's growing season averages 221 days, from March 29 until November 5. This is 72 days longer than Toronto's and longer than any other major urban centre in Canada.

Despite normally semi-mild winters (for its latitude) due to the onshore airflow over the North Pacific Current, occasional cold squamish or Arctic outflow (sinking cold continental air that flows down through the Fraser Valley coastward) in winter can sometimes last a week or more. These Arctic outflows occur on average one to three times per winter. The coldest month on record at Vancouver International Airport was January 1950 when an Arctic air inflow moved in from the Fraser Valley and remained locked over the city, with an average low of −9.7 °C (14.5 °F) and an average high of only −2.9 °C (26.8 °F), making for a daily average of −6.3 °C (20.7 °F),which is 10 °C (18 °F) colder than normal. The coldest temperature ever recorded in the city was −18.3 °C (−0.9 °F) on December 29, 1968, The coldest temperature across Metro Vancouver, however, is −23.3 °C (−10 °F) recorded in Pitt Meadows on January 23, 1969.

With snow being an infrequent occurrence over a typically cool to mild winter, many cold hardy flowers remain in bloom and are common in gardens and office exteriors throughout the winter. The arrival of spring is often first noticed in late February with slightly milder temperatures and the return of flowering perennials. It is also not uncommon for cherry trees to begin blooming later in the month, as was seen prominently during the 2010 Winter Olympics. However, in some years there are also snowstorms and cold temperatures.

The Greater Vancouver region is also subject to significant variations in summer temperatures, which can differ by as much as 5–10 °C (9–18 °F) between inland areas of the Fraser Valley and the ocean-tempered coastal regions when localized on-shore breezes are in effect. Conversely, winter temperatures tend to be cooler inland by a couple of degrees.

=== Daylight ===
The relatively high latitude of 49° 15′ 0″ N (similar to Paris, France, at 48° 85′ 66″) means sunsets as early as 4:10 PM and sunrises as late as 8:12 AM. From November to February, at the sunshine measuring station at the airport in Richmond, on average, more than 70% of the already short daytime is completely cloudy. The percentage of cloudiness is higher in Vancouver and especially the North Shore because upslope winds going up the mountainsides lead to the development of clouds. In a typical winter, Vancouver averages less sunshine than any other major city in Canada.

While fleeting, summers, in contrast, are characterized by a nearly opposite weather pattern, with consistent high pressure and sunshine. July and August are the sunniest months. Near the summer solstice, there are less than 8 hours between sunset and sunrise, which in combination with most of British Columbia observing daylight savings time means that civil twilight can last past 10 pm.

== Precipitation ==
=== Rain ===
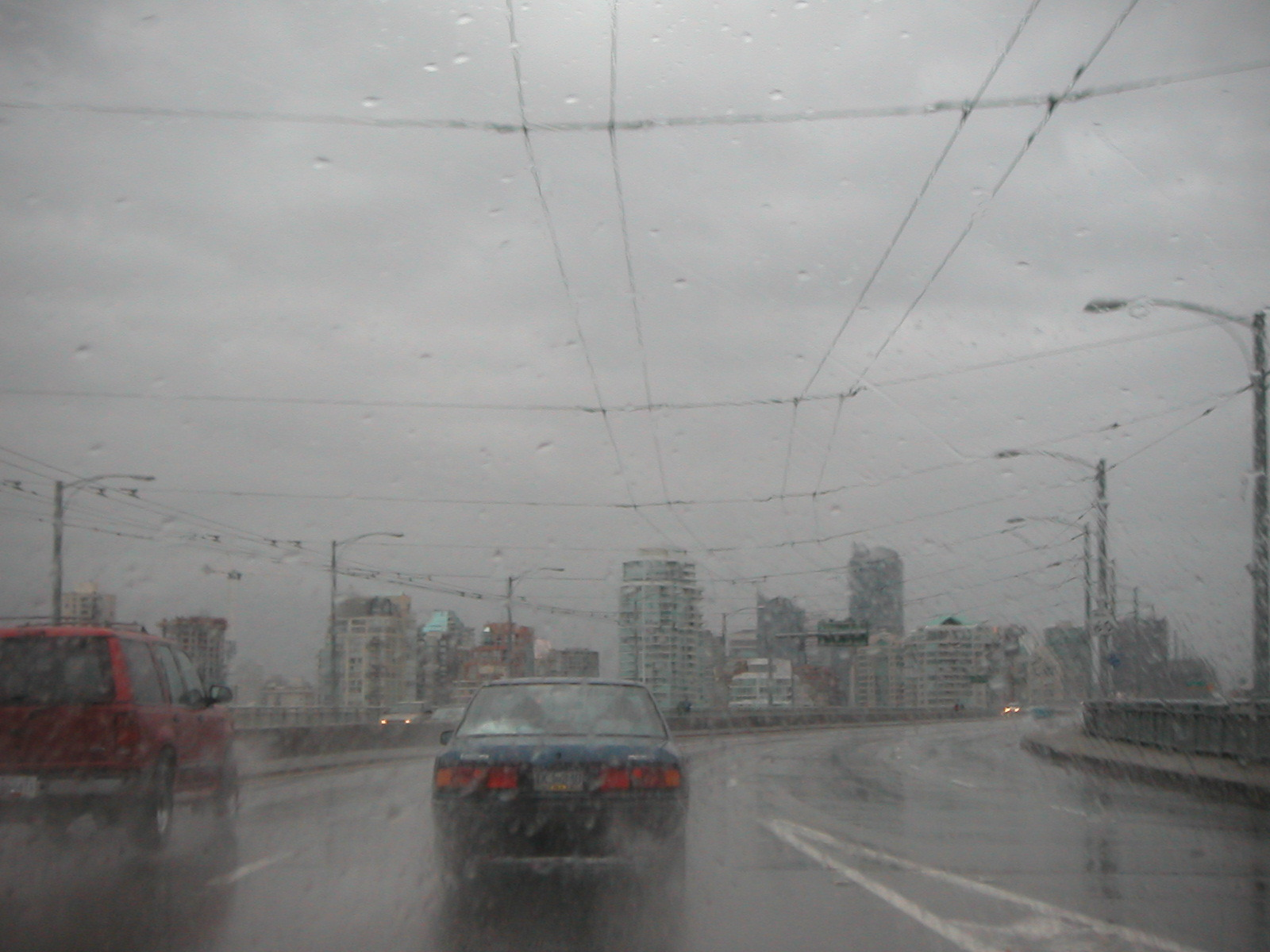
Vancouver on a rainy day

Vancouver is Canada's third rainiest city, with 169 rainy days per year. As measured at Vancouver Airport in Richmond, Vancouver receives 1,189 mm (46.8 in) of rain per year. In North Vancouver, about 20 km (12 mi) away from the Vancouver airport, the amount of rain received doubles to 2,477 mm (97.5 in) per year as measured at the base of Grouse Mountain.

Since Vancouver lacks a hot summer, convective storms are uncommon. Thunderstorms are rare, with an average of 6.1 thunderstorm days per year. The grass-cutting season often begins in March and continues through October. Summers can be quite dry, and, as such, grass that has not been watered may not need to be cut for a month or even longer. July and August can go several weeks without rain. July.2021 did not receive any rain at all. In contrast other Julys and Augusts might have several very wet days in a row. In addition, Vancouver is one of the driest cities in Canada during the summer season, but the rest of the year the high pressure that locks in during the summer moves out and is replaced by the usual low pressure systems (rainy weather) by fall through to mid-spring. The weather in spring and autumn is usually showery, cool, and overcast.

July is historically the driest month in Vancouver and, in fact, Vancouver International Airport recorded no rainfall at all during the whole month of July 2013; the first time ever in recorded history. Many other Julys have recorded less than 1 mm (0.04 in) of rain in Vancouver.

=== Snow ===
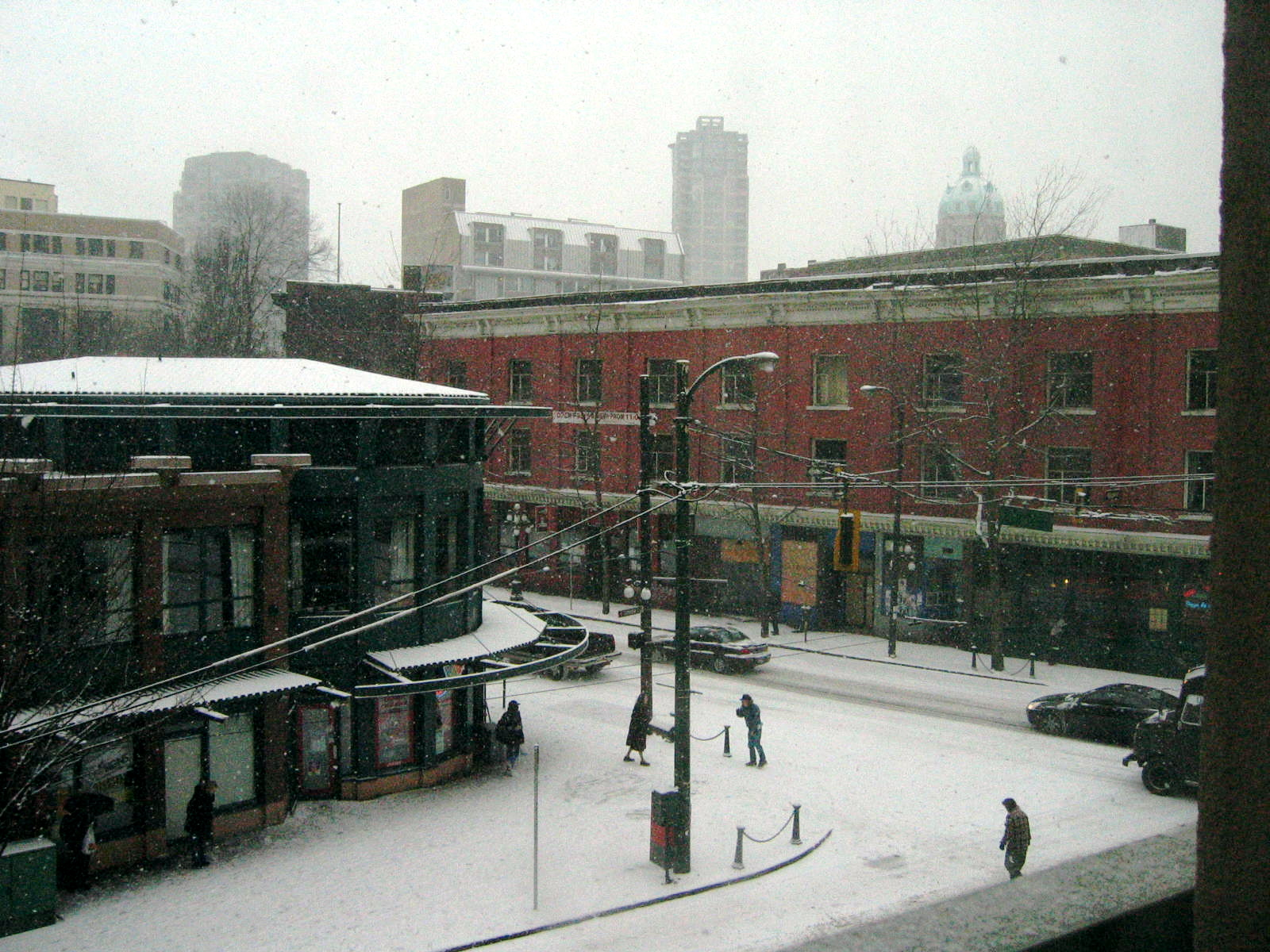
A snowy day in Gastown in January 2004

Snow falls in the higher-lying areas of Greater Vancouver, such as Burnaby Mountain, Coquitlam, and North and West Vancouver, every winter. It is also common in places close to or at sea level, however in lesser amounts. There is a general misconception among visitors and residents of other parts of Canada that Vancouver does not receive any snow at all, but in fact there has never been a year in which traceable snow has not been observed at Vancouver International Airport. The year 2015 marked an entire year of no measurable snow; only a trace was recorded on December 17, 2015. Environment Canada has ranked Vancouver in 3rd place under the category of "lowest snowfall" among 100 major Canadian cities as the annual average of days with snowfall above 0.2 cm (0.08 in) is only at 8.7 days. Vancouver's coastal climate has nonetheless allowed it to be ranked in 59th place under the category of "Most huge snowfall days (25 cm or more)", placing it above cities like Calgary and Toronto as Vancouver averages 0.13 days annually with snowfall accumulations above 25 cm (9.8 in) (within a calendar day).

Snow in Vancouver tends to be quite wet, which, combined with typical winter temperatures rising above and falling below 0 °C (32 °F) throughout the course of the day, can make for icy road conditions.

Years or months with snowfall surpassing 100 cm (39 in) are not completely exceptional. Snowfall exceeding 100 cm (39 in) occurred twice during the 1990s, and, in January 1971 alone, there was more than 120 cm (47 in) of snow. The snowiest year on record at Vancouver International Airport was 1971, which received a total of 242.6 cm (95.5 in), and the greatest snow depth reported was 61 cm (24 in) on January 15 of that year.

Although the 30–60 cm (12–24 in) which fell across Greater Vancouver and the Lower Mainland in a 24‑hour period in November 2006 was out of the ordinary, snow has in fact accumulated at sea level in all months except for June, July, and August. However, even small amounts of snow in the Vancouver area can cause school closures, as well as produce traffic problems. The low frequency of snowfall makes it hard to justify the public works infrastructure necessary for more effective snow removal, as the city is usually in a thaw situation long before plowing of streets are completed. The City budgets $400,000 per year for the maintenance of snow removal equipment, for the purchasing of de-icing salt, and for the training of staff, but the costs of actual snow removal are funded separately from contingency reserve funds, and vary widely from season to season. For example, $1.1 million was spent in 1998, compared to $0 in 2001. Blizzards are extremely rare, but heavy snowfall events are more common. One such event in 1996 resulted in over 60 cm (24 in) of snow in Vancouver and was responsible for millions of dollars in damage.

According to Environment and Climate Change Canada (2011), Vancouver now has a 20% chance of a White Christmas (up from 11%). Vancouver experienced a White Christmas in 2008 after weeks of record breaking cold temperatures and four consecutive snow storms, leaving over 60 cm (24 in) of snow on the ground across Metro Vancouver. New snow also accumulated on Christmas Eve and Christmas Day giving it the title for Canada's whitest Christmas in 2008 with 41 cm (16 in) on ground (48 cm (19 in) at one point on Christmas Eve). Snow was also present for Christmas 2007, when 1 cm (0.39 in) was measured at the Vancouver International Airport. The previous official White Christmas occurred in 1998 when 20 cm (7.9 in) of snow was on the ground on Christmas Day following 31 cm (12 in) of snow and 20 mm (0.79 in) of rain. Despite higher frequency of snow during certain periods of the season (pattern unknown), generally, annual winter snowfall has decreased over the last 20 years.

== Severe weather ==
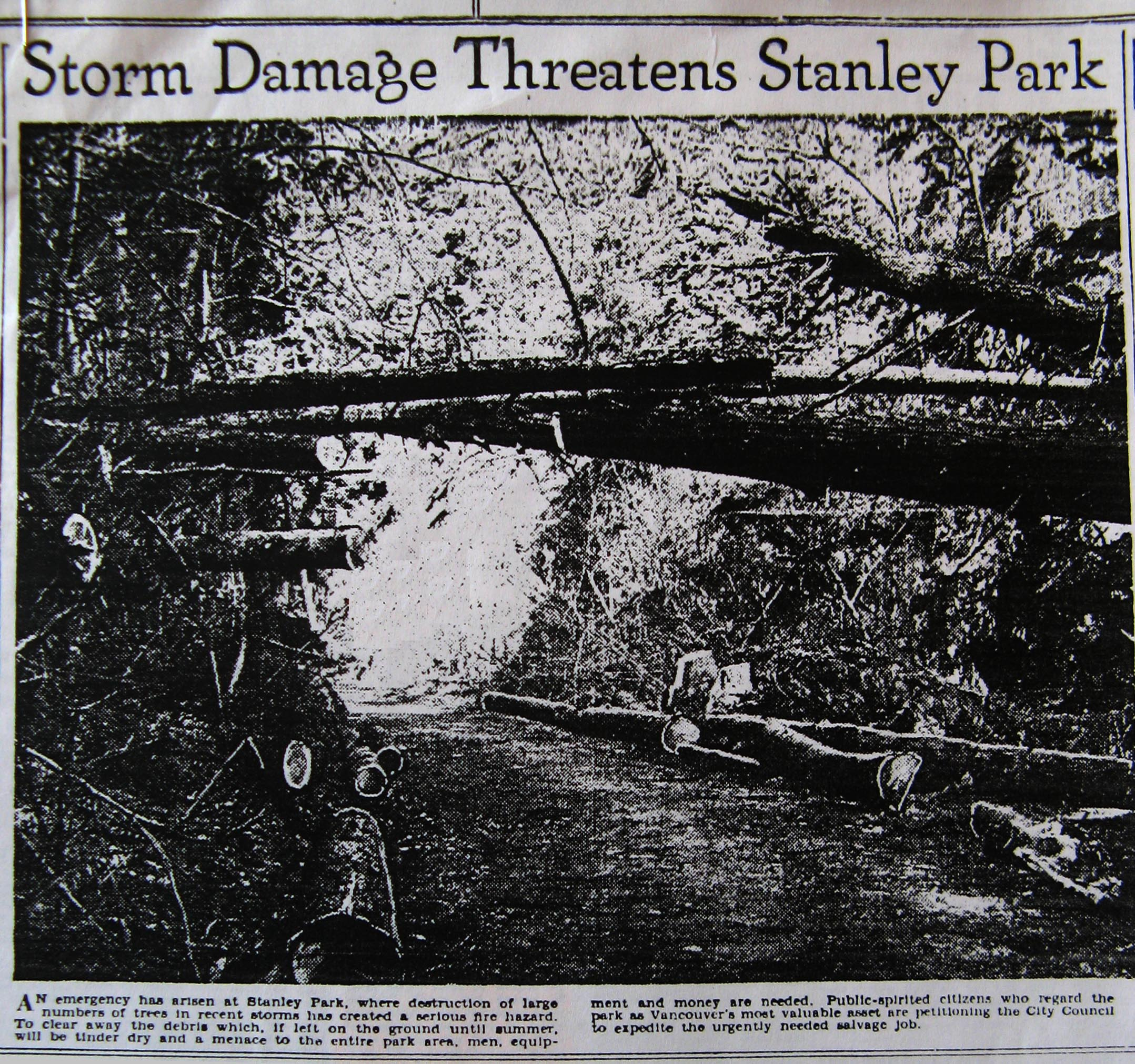
Photograph of damage caused by the 1934 storm published in the February 8, 1935, edition of Vancouver Daily Province

Gales are unlikely during the autumn months in Greater Vancouver. Three wind storms in the city's history have knocked down large swathes of trees in the forest of Stanley Park, the first having occurred in October 1934, with a blizzard the following January compounding its impact. The second wind storm to hit Stanley Park was the remnant of Typhoon Freda in 1962 that levelled a 2.4-hectare (6-acre) tract of forest. This is now site of the park's miniature railroad.

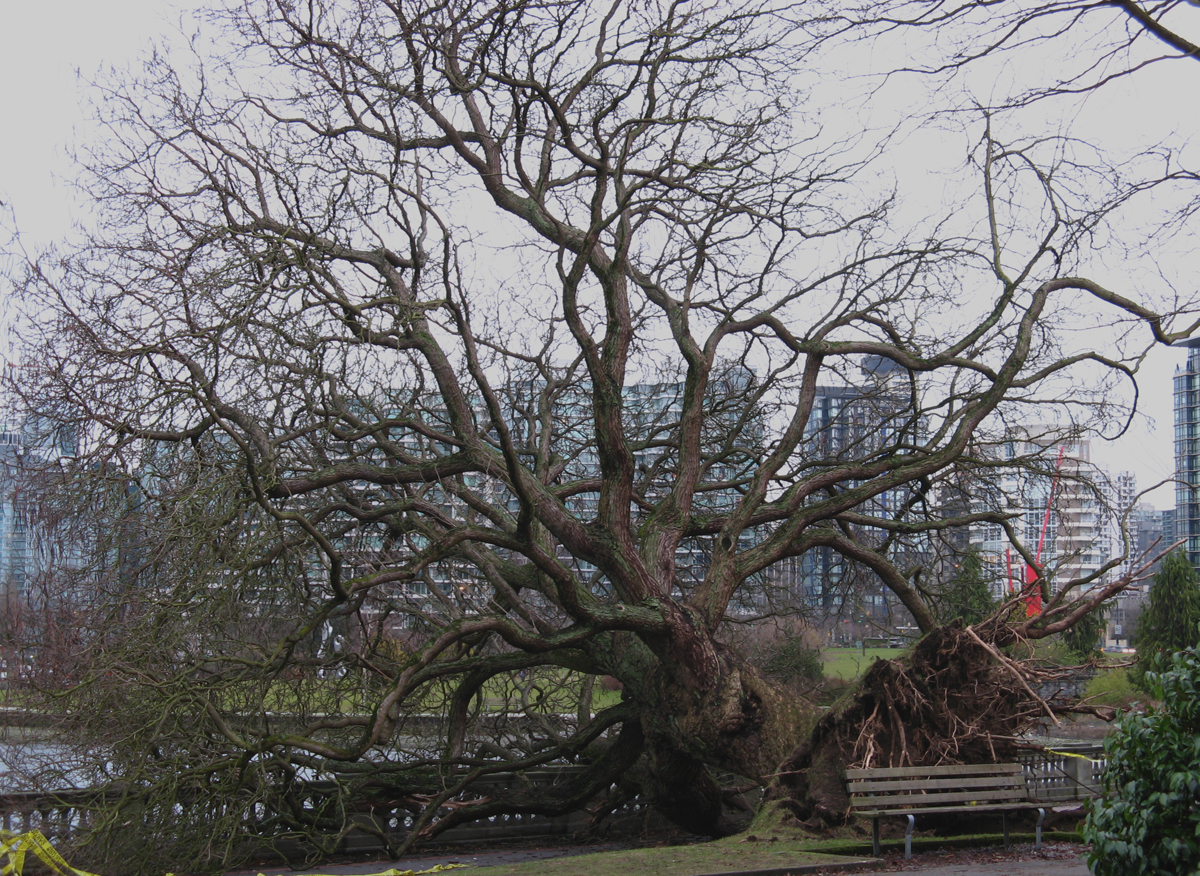
Tree uprooted by the Hanukkah Eve windstorm of 2006 on December 15, 2006

=== 2006 storms ===
In November 2006, the Greater Vancouver region experienced above-average levels of rainfall and snowfall, breaking the previously established record of 18.1 cm (7.1 in) when 25.5 cm (10.0 in) of rain fell within the first 16 days of the month. The heavy rain washed sediment into the city's reservoirs, and, as result, many businesses were advised to stop serving beverages prepared from tap water due to water contamination.

At Vancouver International Airport, 28 cm (11 in) of snow was recorded from the night of November 25 to the morning of November 27. The temperature dropped to −12 °C (10 °F) on November 28, 1.8 °C (3.2 °F) higher than the record low for the day, which was set in November 1985. On November 29, 10 cm (3.9 in) more snow fell on the city. The snowfall resulted in the closure of a number of public institutions and caused power outages throughout Surrey and Langley.

The Hanukkah Eve windstorm of 2006 swept through Greater Vancouver on December 15, 2006, with winds reaching from 70 to 125 km/h (43 to 78 mph). In Stanley Park, it damaged or uprooted over 5,000 trees, and caused mudslides, one of which destroyed a section of the seawall. Insured damages throughout the province were expected to reach CA$40 million and repairs to Stanley Park were expected to cost $9 million.

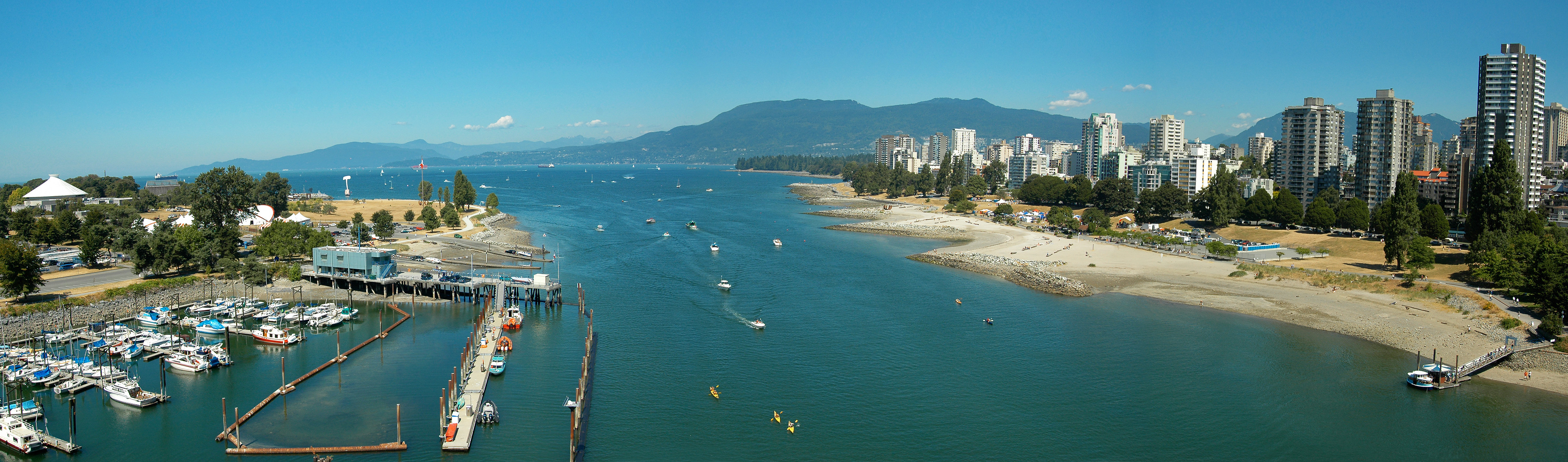
The view from the Burrard Bridge of the mouth of False Creek on a dry summer day

== Statistics ==
=== 1991–2020 normals ===
==== Vancouver International Airport ====
YVR maximum records:

- Record high temperature of 34.4 °C (93.9 °F) recorded on July 30, 2009
- Record high daily minimum of 22.4 °C (72.3 °F) recorded on July 30, 2009
- Record high dew point of 23.0 °C (73.4 °F) recorded on July 29, 2022
- Most humid month with an average monthly dew point of 16.5 °C (61.7 °F) recorded during August 2022
- Warmest month with an average monthly mean temperature of 20.6 °C (69.1 °F) recorded during July 1958
  - Warmest monthly average daily maximum of 25.5 °C (77.9 °F) recorded during July 1958
  - Warmest monthly average daily minimum of 15.6 °C (60.1 °F) recorded during July 1958
  - July 1958 saw no daily maximum temperature below 21.7 °C (71.1 °F)
  - August 2004 saw no temperature below 13.2 °C (55.8 °F)
  - August 2014 saw no dew point below 10.8 °C (51.4 °F)

The lowest yearly maximum dew point is 16.5 °C (61.7 °F) recorded in 1996; the lowest yearly maximum daily minimum temperature is 15.0 °C (59.0 °F) recorded 5 times between 1937 and most recently in 1966; and the lowest yearly maximum temperature is 24.4 °C (75.9 °F) recorded in 1954.

The average yearly maximum dew point is 18.7 °C (65.7 °F) and the average yearly maximum daily minimum temperature is 18.0 °C (64.4 °F).

Climate data for Richmond (Vancouver International Airport) Climate ID: 1108447; coordinates 49°11′42″N 123°10′55″W; elevation: 4.3 m (14 ft); 1991–2020 normals, extremes 1898–present (Note: 1981–2010 normals are for Vancouver International Airport, while extreme high and low temperatures are from Vancouver PMO (October 1898 to May 1945), and Vancouver International Airport (January 1937 to present).)
| Month | Jan | Feb | Mar | Apr | May | Jun | Jul | Aug | Sep | Oct | Nov | Dec | Year |
|---|---|---|---|---|---|---|---|---|---|---|---|---|---|
| Record high humidex | 17.2 | 18.0 | 20.3 | 24.7 | 33.7 | 38.4 | 38.3 | 35.9 | 33.0 | 27.2 | 21.1 | 16.6 | 38.4 |
| Record high °C (°F) | 15.3 (59.5) | 18.4 (65.1) | 20.0 (68.0) | 26.1 (79.0) | 30.4 (86.7) | 33.3 (91.9) | 34.4 (93.9) | 33.3 (91.9) | 30.0 (86.0) | 25.0 (77.0) | 23.3 (73.9) | 15.7 (60.3) | 34.4 (93.9) |
| Mean maximum °C (°F) | 12.2 (54.0) | 12.8 (55.0) | 15.2 (59.4) | 18.8 (65.8) | 23.5 (74.3) | 25.9 (78.6) | 27.8 (82.0) | 27.3 (81.1) | 24.6 (76.3) | 19.1 (66.4) | 14.6 (58.3) | 11.7 (53.1) | 28.9 (84.0) |
| Mean daily maximum °C (°F) | 6.8 (44.2) | 7.9 (46.2) | 10.1 (50.2) | 13.1 (55.6) | 16.9 (62.4) | 19.6 (67.3) | 22.4 (72.3) | 22.4 (72.3) | 19.1 (66.4) | 13.5 (56.3) | 9.3 (48.7) | 6.6 (43.9) | 14.0 (57.2) |
| Daily mean °C (°F) | 4.1 (39.4) | 4.7 (40.5) | 6.7 (44.1) | 9.4 (48.9) | 13.0 (55.4) | 15.8 (60.4) | 18.2 (64.8) | 18.2 (64.8) | 15.2 (59.4) | 10.3 (50.5) | 6.4 (43.5) | 3.9 (39.0) | 10.5 (50.9) |
| Mean daily minimum °C (°F) | 1.4 (34.5) | 1.5 (34.7) | 3.3 (37.9) | 5.7 (42.3) | 9.0 (48.2) | 11.9 (53.4) | 13.9 (57.0) | 14.0 (57.2) | 11.2 (52.2) | 7.0 (44.6) | 3.6 (38.5) | 1.2 (34.2) | 7.0 (44.6) |
| Mean minimum °C (°F) | −6.5 (20.3) | −4.1 (24.6) | −2.0 (28.4) | 1.2 (34.2) | 4.4 (39.9) | 8.2 (46.8) | 10.6 (51.1) | 10.8 (51.4) | 6.8 (44.2) | 0.9 (33.6) | −3.6 (25.5) | −5.9 (21.4) | −8.8 (16.2) |
| Record low °C (°F) | −17.8 (0.0) | −16.1 (3.0) | −9.4 (15.1) | −3.3 (26.1) | 0.6 (33.1) | 3.9 (39.0) | 6.1 (43.0) | 3.9 (39.0) | −1.1 (30.0) | −6.1 (21.0) | −14.3 (6.3) | −17.8 (0.0) | −17.8 (0.0) |
| Record low wind chill | −22.6 | −21.2 | −14.5 | −5.4 | 0.0 | 0.0 | 0.0 | 0.0 | 0.0 | −11.4 | −21.3 | −27.8 | −27.8 |
| Average precipitation mm (inches) | 174.0 (6.85) | 90.8 (3.57) | 106.4 (4.19) | 85.5 (3.37) | 59.1 (2.33) | 51.1 (2.01) | 34.1 (1.34) | 36.1 (1.42) | 51.9 (2.04) | 123.9 (4.88) | 174.6 (6.87) | 172.2 (6.78) | 1,159.5 (45.65) |
| Average rainfall mm (inches) | 162.1 (6.38) | 84.6 (3.33) | 104.1 (4.10) | 85.2 (3.35) | 59.1 (2.33) | 51.1 (2.01) | 34.1 (1.34) | 36.1 (1.42) | 51.9 (2.04) | 123.7 (4.87) | 171.2 (6.74) | 155.8 (6.13) | 1,119.2 (44.06) |
| Average snowfall cm (inches) | 12.3 (4.8) | 4.5 (1.8) | 2.6 (1.0) | 0.1 (0.0) | 0.0 (0.0) | 0.0 (0.0) | 0.0 (0.0) | 0.0 (0.0) | 0.0 (0.0) | 0.1 (0.0) | 3.2 (1.3) | 13.9 (5.5) | 36.6 (14.4) |
| Average precipitation days (≥ 0.2 mm) | 20.0 | 15.5 | 17.6 | 15.3 | 12.7 | 11.6 | 6.2 | 6.4 | 8.6 | 15.4 | 19.6 | 20.5 | 169.5 |
| Average rainy days (≥ 0.2 mm) | 18.8 | 14.7 | 17.3 | 15.3 | 12.7 | 11.6 | 6.2 | 6.4 | 8.6 | 15.4 | 19.3 | 19.7 | 166.0 |
| Average snowy days (≥ 0.2 cm) | 2.7 | 1.2 | 0.84 | 0.12 | 0.0 | 0.0 | 0.0 | 0.0 | 0.0 | 0.04 | 0.64 | 1.9 | 7.4 |
| Average relative humidity (%) (at 15:00 LST) | 81.1 | 74.8 | 70.1 | 65.7 | 63.7 | 62.0 | 61.2 | 62.2 | 67.9 | 76.2 | 80.0 | 81.9 | 70.6 |
| Average dew point °C (°F) | 2.1 (35.8) | 1.7 (35.1) | 3.1 (37.6) | 5.2 (41.4) | 8.4 (47.1) | 10.6 (51.1) | 12.8 (55.0) | 13.3 (55.9) | 11.4 (52.5) | 7.8 (46.0) | 4.2 (39.6) | 1.9 (35.4) | 6.9 (44.4) |
| Mean monthly sunshine hours | 60.2 | 91.0 | 134.8 | 185.0 | 222.5 | 226.9 | 289.8 | 277.1 | 212.8 | 120.7 | 60.4 | 56.5 | 1,937.5 |
| Percentage possible sunshine | 22.3 | 31.8 | 36.6 | 45.0 | 46.9 | 46.8 | 59.3 | 62.1 | 56.1 | 36.0 | 21.9 | 22.0 | 40.6 |
| Average ultraviolet index | 1 | 1 | 3 | 4 | 6 | 6 | 7 | 6 | 4 | 2 | 1 | 1 | 4 |
Source 1: Environment and Climate Change Canada (sun 1981–2010)
Source 2: Weather Atlas(UV) weatherstats.ca (for dewpoint and monthly/yearly average absolute maximum/minimum temperature)

==== Vancouver Harbour ====
Vancouver Harbour CS maximum records:

- Record high temperature of 34.9 °C (94.8 °F) recorded on July 29, 2009
- Record high daily minimum of 21.1 °C (70.0 °F) recorded on July 30, 2009
- Record high dew point of 21.0 °C (69.8 °F) recorded on July 29, 2022
- Most humid month with an average monthly dew point of 15.2 °C (59.4 °F) recorded during August 2022
- Warmest month with an average monthly mean temperature of 21.0 °C (69.8 °F) recorded during August 2022
  - Warmest monthly average daily maximum of 25.5 °C (77.9 °F) recorded during August 2022
  - Warmest monthly average daily minimum of 16.4 °C (61.5 °F) recorded during August 2022
  - August 2017 saw no daily maximum temperature below 21.3 °C (70.3 °F)
  - July 2021 saw no temperature below 14.8 °C (58.6 °F)
  - August 2016 saw no dew point below 10.2 °C (50.4 °F)

The lowest yearly maximum dew point is 16.1 °C (61.0 °F) recorded in 1976; the lowest yearly maximum daily minimum temperature is 16.1 °C (61.0 °F) recorded in 1976; and the lowest yearly maximum temperature is 25.0 °C (77.0 °F) recorded in 1976.

The average yearly maximum dew point is 18.1 °C (64.6 °F) and the average yearly maximum daily minimum temperature is 18.2 °C (64.8 °F).

Climate data for Vancouver Harbour CS (normals 1991–2020, extremes 1958-present)
| Month | Jan | Feb | Mar | Apr | May | Jun | Jul | Aug | Sep | Oct | Nov | Dec | Year |
|---|---|---|---|---|---|---|---|---|---|---|---|---|---|
| Record high humidex | 14.4 | 14.7 | 18.4 | 25.8 | 33.9 | 38.0 | 38.8 | 34.5 | 32.6 | 25.8 | 19.8 | 15.9 | 38.8 |
| Record high °C (°F) | 15.6 (60.1) | 16.4 (61.5) | 19.8 (67.6) | 26.7 (80.1) | 32.7 (90.9) | 33.8 (92.8) | 34.9 (94.8) | 32.2 (90.0) | 28.5 (83.3) | 24.2 (75.6) | 18.0 (64.4) | 15.3 (59.5) | 34.9 (94.8) |
| Mean maximum °C (°F) | 12.1 (53.8) | 12.5 (54.5) | 15.8 (60.4) | 20.0 (68.0) | 24.7 (76.5) | 26.4 (79.5) | 28.9 (84.0) | 28.4 (83.1) | 24.9 (76.8) | 19.3 (66.7) | 14.4 (57.9) | 11.9 (53.4) | 29.9 (85.8) |
| Mean daily maximum °C (°F) | 7.4 (45.3) | 8.4 (47.1) | 10.5 (50.9) | 13.9 (57.0) | 17.8 (64.0) | 20.2 (68.4) | 23.0 (73.4) | 23.0 (73.4) | 19.4 (66.9) | 13.9 (57.0) | 9.7 (49.5) | 7.1 (44.8) | 14.5 (58.1) |
| Daily mean °C (°F) | 5.3 (41.5) | 5.9 (42.6) | 7.6 (45.7) | 10.4 (50.7) | 14.0 (57.2) | 16.5 (61.7) | 19.0 (66.2) | 18.9 (66.0) | 15.8 (60.4) | 11.2 (52.2) | 7.5 (45.5) | 5.2 (41.4) | 11.4 (52.5) |
| Mean daily minimum °C (°F) | 3.3 (37.9) | 3.3 (37.9) | 4.6 (40.3) | 6.9 (44.4) | 10.2 (50.4) | 12.8 (55.0) | 14.9 (58.8) | 14.8 (58.6) | 12.1 (53.8) | 8.6 (47.5) | 5.3 (41.5) | 3.2 (37.8) | 8.3 (46.9) |
| Mean minimum °C (°F) | −2.7 (27.1) | −1.1 (30.0) | 0.1 (32.2) | 2.8 (37.0) | 6.1 (43.0) | 9.0 (48.2) | 11.8 (53.2) | 11.7 (53.1) | 8.6 (47.5) | 3.6 (38.5) | −0.2 (31.6) | −2.2 (28.0) | −4.9 (23.2) |
| Record low °C (°F) | −13.3 (8.1) | −6.7 (19.9) | −5 (23) | −1.1 (30.0) | 1.1 (34.0) | 2.8 (37.0) | 2.8 (37.0) | 5.0 (41.0) | 1.7 (35.1) | −3.2 (26.2) | −9.9 (14.2) | −15.6 (3.9) | −15.6 (3.9) |
| Record low wind chill | −11 | −9 | −9 | — | — | — | — | — | — | −8 | −15 | −15 | −15 |
| Average precipitation mm (inches) | 236.6 (9.31) | 117.0 (4.61) | 162.5 (6.40) | 117.7 (4.63) | 72.6 (2.86) | 65.7 (2.59) | 43.5 (1.71) | 48.6 (1.91) | 71.4 (2.81) | 156.8 (6.17) | 245.2 (9.65) | 199.9 (7.87) | 1,537.4 (60.53) |
| Average precipitation days (≥ 0.2 mm) | 21.0 | 16.2 | 18.5 | 16.4 | 12.1 | 11.7 | 7.2 | 7.1 | 9.8 | 16.9 | 21.7 | 20.7 | 179.1 |
| Average dew point °C (°F) | 2.8 (37.0) | 1.7 (35.1) | 2.7 (36.9) | 5.0 (41.0) | 8.4 (47.1) | 10.4 (50.7) | 12.8 (55.0) | 13.1 (55.6) | 11.3 (52.3) | 7.8 (46.0) | 4.2 (39.6) | 2.3 (36.1) | 6.9 (44.4) |
| Mean monthly sunshine hours | 51.1 | 79.6 | 124.7 | 161.3 | 222.8 | 223.5 | 276.8 | 256.6 | 178.3 | 127.3 | 66.9 | 49.6 | 1,818.4 |
Source 1: Environment and Climate Change Canada June record high
Source 2: Environment and Climate Change Canada (sun, 1961–1990)

==== West Vancouver ====
West Vancouver maximum records:

- Record high temperature of 40.6 °C (105.1 °F) recorded on June 27, 2021
- Record high daily minimum of 24.5 °C (76.1 °F) recorded on June 28, 2021
- Record high dew point of 21.2 °C (70.2 °F) recorded on July 20, 1997
- Most humid month with an average monthly dew point of 15.0 °C (59.0 °F) recorded during July 1998
- Warmest month with an average monthly mean temperature of 20.5 °C (68.9 °F) recorded during August 2022
  - Warmest monthly average daily maximum of 26.1 °C (79.0 °F) recorded during August 2022
  - Warmest monthly average daily minimum of 16.5 °C (61.7 °F) recorded during August 2022
  - August 2003 saw no daily maximum temperature below 21.6 °C (70.9 °F)
  - August 2014 saw no temperature below 13.0 °C (55.4 °F)
  - July 1998 saw no dew point below 10.3 °C (50.5 °F)

The lowest yearly maximum dew point is 16.0 °C (60.8 °F) recorded in 2015; the lowest yearly maximum daily minimum temperature is 16.0 °C (60.8 °F) recorded in 1997; and the lowest yearly maximum temperature is 27.6 °C (81.7 °F) recorded in 1999.

The average yearly maximum dew point is 18.1 °C (64.6 °F) and the average yearly maximum daily minimum temperature is 19.0 °C (66.2 °F).

Climate data for West Vancouver (1991–2020 normals, extremes 1992–present)
| Month | Jan | Feb | Mar | Apr | May | Jun | Jul | Aug | Sep | Oct | Nov | Dec | Year |
|---|---|---|---|---|---|---|---|---|---|---|---|---|---|
| Record high humidex | — | — | — | 27 | 33 | 46 | 39 | 38 | 35 | 27 | — | — | 46 |
| Record high °C (°F) | 17.9 (64.2) | 17.9 (64.2) | 24.3 (75.7) | 28.8 (83.8) | 31.7 (89.1) | 40.6 (105.1) | 36.0 (96.8) | 35.5 (95.9) | 33.6 (92.5) | 25.0 (77.0) | 19.2 (66.6) | 15.6 (60.1) | 40.6 (105.1) |
| Mean maximum °C (°F) | 12.7 (54.9) | 13.6 (56.5) | 17.0 (62.6) | 21.4 (70.5) | 26.1 (79.0) | 28.2 (82.8) | 30.0 (86.0) | 30.1 (86.2) | 27.0 (80.6) | 20.8 (69.4) | 15.2 (59.4) | 12.0 (53.6) | 32.1 (89.8) |
| Mean daily maximum °C (°F) | 6.9 (44.4) | 8.3 (46.9) | 10.5 (50.9) | 13.8 (56.8) | 17.8 (64.0) | 20.2 (68.4) | 23.1 (73.6) | 23.4 (74.1) | 20.1 (68.2) | 14.0 (57.2) | 9.2 (48.6) | 6.3 (43.3) | 14.5 (58.0) |
| Daily mean °C (°F) | 4.0 (39.2) | 4.3 (39.7) | 6.1 (43.0) | 8.7 (47.7) | 12.5 (54.5) | 15.1 (59.2) | 17.8 (64.0) | 17.9 (64.2) | 14.9 (58.8) | 10.0 (50.0) | 6.1 (43.0) | 3.5 (38.3) | 10.1 (50.2) |
| Mean daily minimum °C (°F) | 1.7 (35.1) | 1.7 (35.1) | 3.1 (37.6) | 5.1 (41.2) | 8.6 (47.5) | 11.1 (52.0) | 13.5 (56.3) | 13.9 (57.0) | 11.4 (52.5) | 7.3 (45.1) | 3.6 (38.5) | 1.3 (34.3) | 6.9 (44.4) |
| Mean minimum °C (°F) | −4.9 (23.2) | −3.3 (26.1) | −1.4 (29.5) | 1.1 (34.0) | 4.0 (39.2) | 7.4 (45.3) | 9.9 (49.8) | 10.3 (50.5) | 7.1 (44.8) | 2.5 (36.5) | −2.1 (28.2) | −4.5 (23.9) | −7.8 (18.0) |
| Record low °C (°F) | −12.8 (9.0) | −9.5 (14.9) | −6.0 (21.2) | −1.6 (29.1) | 0.6 (33.1) | 4.9 (40.8) | 7.1 (44.8) | 7.3 (45.1) | 3.4 (38.1) | −1.8 (28.8) | −10.5 (13.1) | −13.0 (8.6) | −13.0 (8.6) |
| Record low wind chill | −16 | −10 | −9 | −4 | — | — | — | — | — | −4 | −13 | −17 | −17 |
| Average precipitation mm (inches) | 274.9 (10.82) | 161.7 (6.37) | 222.8 (8.77) | 126.0 (4.96) | 112.3 (4.42) | 82.7 (3.26) | 49.4 (1.94) | 49.9 (1.96) | 99.0 (3.90) | 206.0 (8.11) | 296.4 (11.67) | 282.5 (11.12) | 1,963.6 (77.3) |
| Average dew point °C (°F) | 2.0 (35.6) | 1.2 (34.2) | 2.5 (36.5) | 4.0 (39.2) | 7.4 (45.3) | 10.0 (50.0) | 12.2 (54.0) | 12.4 (54.3) | 10.6 (51.1) | 7.1 (44.8) | 3.8 (38.8) | 1.6 (34.9) | 6.3 (43.3) |
Source: weatherstats.ca

==== Pitt Meadows ====
Pitt Meadows maximum records:

- Record high temperature of 41.4 °C (106.5 °F) recorded on June 28, 2021
- Record high daily minimum of 21.5 °C (70.7 °F) recorded on June 29, 2021
- Record high dew point of 21.8 °C (71.2 °F) recorded on July 22, 2006
- Most humid month with an average monthly dew point of 15.8 °C (60.4 °F) recorded during August 2004
- Warmest month with an average monthly mean temperature of 21.5 °C (70.7 °F) recorded during August 2022
  - Warmest monthly average daily maximum of 28.0 °C (82.4 °F) recorded during August 2022
  - Warmest monthly average daily minimum of 15.8 °C (60.4 °F) recorded during August 2025
  - August 2017 saw no daily maximum temperature below 23.0 °C (73.4 °F)
  - July 2023 saw no temperature below 12.7 °C (54.9 °F)
  - August 2004 saw no dew point below 11.5 °C (52.7 °F)

The lowest yearly maximum dew point is 16.9 °C (62.4 °F) recorded in 2019; the lowest yearly maximum daily minimum temperature is 15.4 °C (59.7 °F) recorded in 2005; and the lowest yearly maximum temperature is 29.6 °C (85.3 °F) recorded in 1999.

The average yearly maximum dew point is 18.9 °C (66.0 °F) and the average yearly maximum daily minimum temperature is 17.4 °C (63.3 °F).

Climate data for Pitt Meadows CS WMO ID: 71775; normals 1991–2020 normals, extremes 1993–present
| Month | Jan | Feb | Mar | Apr | May | Jun | Jul | Aug | Sep | Oct | Nov | Dec | Year |
|---|---|---|---|---|---|---|---|---|---|---|---|---|---|
| Record high humidex | 19.5 | 19.4 | 24.8 | 29.6 | 34.0 | 47.0 | 44.2 | 40.2 | 37.8 | 31.2 | 23.0 | 19.1 | 47.0 |
| Record high °C (°F) | 17.1 (62.8) | 19.6 (67.3) | 25.0 (77.0) | 29.8 (85.6) | 33.2 (91.8) | 41.4 (106.5) | 37.6 (99.7) | 36.6 (97.9) | 34.4 (93.9) | 27.7 (81.9) | 20.0 (68.0) | 16.5 (61.7) | 41.4 (106.5) |
| Mean maximum °C (°F) | 12.8 (55.0) | 14.5 (58.1) | 18.7 (65.7) | 23.7 (74.7) | 27.8 (82.0) | 30.3 (86.5) | 32.9 (91.2) | 32.2 (90.0) | 29.3 (84.7) | 22.2 (72.0) | 15.7 (60.3) | 12.5 (54.5) | 34.0 (93.2) |
| Mean daily maximum °C (°F) | 6.8 (44.2) | 8.8 (47.8) | 11.3 (52.3) | 14.9 (58.8) | 19.0 (66.2) | 21.3 (70.3) | 25.0 (77.0) | 25.1 (77.2) | 21.5 (70.7) | 15.0 (59.0) | 9.6 (49.3) | 6.1 (43.0) | 15.4 (59.7) |
| Daily mean °C (°F) | 3.6 (38.5) | 4.6 (40.3) | 6.8 (44.2) | 9.7 (49.5) | 13.5 (56.3) | 16.1 (61.0) | 18.8 (65.8) | 18.8 (65.8) | 15.7 (60.3) | 10.5 (50.9) | 6.0 (42.8) | 3.1 (37.6) | 10.6 (51.1) |
| Mean daily minimum °C (°F) | 0.5 (32.9) | 0.4 (32.7) | 2.3 (36.1) | 4.5 (40.1) | 7.9 (46.2) | 10.8 (51.4) | 12.6 (54.7) | 12.4 (54.3) | 9.8 (49.6) | 5.9 (42.6) | 2.4 (36.3) | 0.1 (32.2) | 5.8 (42.4) |
| Mean minimum °C (°F) | −8.0 (17.6) | −6.1 (21.0) | −3.4 (25.9) | −0.7 (30.7) | 2.2 (36.0) | 6.4 (43.5) | 8.5 (47.3) | 8.4 (47.1) | 4.6 (40.3) | −0.6 (30.9) | −5.0 (23.0) | −7.5 (18.5) | −10.7 (12.7) |
| Record low °C (°F) | −15.7 (3.7) | −12.4 (9.7) | −7.7 (18.1) | −3.1 (26.4) | −1.0 (30.2) | 3.8 (38.8) | 5.2 (41.4) | 5.1 (41.2) | 0.9 (33.6) | −6.0 (21.2) | −12.8 (9.0) | −16.3 (2.7) | −16.3 (2.7) |
| Record low wind chill | −23.0 | −14.9 | −11.6 | −5.0 | 0.0 | 0.0 | 0.0 | 0.0 | 0.0 | −7.3 | −16.7 | −20.0 | −23.0 |
| Average precipitation mm (inches) | 252.4 (9.94) | 133.6 (5.26) | 173.4 (6.83) | 104.5 (4.11) | 95.3 (3.75) | 68.9 (2.71) | 47.6 (1.87) | 36.3 (1.43) | 94.0 (3.70) | 180.0 (7.09) | 249.0 (9.80) | 214.1 (8.43) | 1,649 (64.92) |
| Average precipitation days (≥ 0.2 mm) | 22.2 | 17.8 | 20.3 | 15.2 | 13.2 | 12.8 | 8.7 | 7.5 | 11.3 | 18.0 | 21.4 | 21.8 | 189.8 |
| Average dew point °C (°F) | 1.8 (35.2) | 1.1 (34.0) | 2.7 (36.9) | 4.7 (40.5) | 8.0 (46.4) | 10.5 (50.9) | 12.7 (54.9) | 13.1 (55.6) | 11.3 (52.3) | 7.6 (45.7) | 3.9 (39.0) | 1.4 (34.5) | 6.6 (43.9) |
Source 1: Environment Canada
Source 2: weatherstats.ca (for dewpoint and monthly/yearly average absolute maximum/minimum temperature)

==== White Rock ====
White Rock maximum records:

- Record high temperature of 38.5 °C (101.3 °F) recorded on June 28, 2021
- Record high daily minimum of 20.9 °C (69.6 °F) recorded on June 28, 2021
- Record high dew point of 22.0 °C (71.6 °F) recorded on July 29, 2009
- Most humid month with an average monthly dew point of 15.9 °C (60.6 °F) recorded during July 1998
- Warmest month with an average monthly mean temperature of 19.3 °C (66.7 °F) recorded during August 2022
  - Warmest monthly average daily maximum of 25.2 °C (77.4 °F) recorded during July 1941
  - Warmest monthly average daily minimum of 15.2 °C (59.4 °F) recorded during August 2022
  - July 1937 saw no daily maximum temperature below 21.1 °C (70.0 °F)
  - August 2004 saw no temperature below 13.3 °C (55.9 °F)
  - July 1998 saw no dew point below 11.1 °C (52.0 °F)

The lowest yearly maximum dew point is 17.8 °C (64.0 °F) recorded in 2019; the lowest yearly maximum daily minimum temperature is 13.9 °C (57.0 °F) recorded in 1955; and the lowest yearly maximum temperature is 22.8 °C (73.0 °F) recorded in 1954.

The average yearly maximum dew point is 19.3 °C (66.7 °F) and the average yearly maximum daily minimum temperature is 17.8 °C (64.0 °F).

Climate data for White Rock (1991–2020 normals, extremes 1929–present)
| Month | Jan | Feb | Mar | Apr | May | Jun | Jul | Aug | Sep | Oct | Nov | Dec | Year |
|---|---|---|---|---|---|---|---|---|---|---|---|---|---|
| Record high humidex | — | — | — | 28 | 32 | 46 | 39 | 41 | 35 | 26 | — | — | 46 |
| Record high °C (°F) | 17.2 (63.0) | 20.5 (68.9) | 25.8 (78.4) | 27.4 (81.3) | 31.5 (88.7) | 38.5 (101.3) | 36.2 (97.2) | 37.0 (98.6) | 31.7 (89.1) | 28.9 (84.0) | 20.6 (69.1) | 17.3 (63.1) | 38.5 (101.3) |
| Mean maximum °C (°F) | 13.1 (55.6) | 14.3 (57.7) | 17.3 (63.1) | 21.7 (71.1) | 25.0 (77.0) | 26.7 (80.1) | 28.8 (83.8) | 28.1 (82.6) | 25.9 (78.6) | 20.6 (69.1) | 15.7 (60.3) | 12.7 (54.9) | 30.8 (87.4) |
| Mean daily maximum °C (°F) | 7.7 (45.9) | 9.2 (48.6) | 11.3 (52.3) | 14.1 (57.4) | 17.4 (63.3) | 19.7 (67.5) | 22.1 (71.8) | 22.1 (71.8) | 19.4 (66.9) | 14.5 (58.1) | 10.3 (50.5) | 7.3 (45.1) | 14.6 (58.3) |
| Daily mean °C (°F) | 4.8 (40.6) | 5.4 (41.7) | 7.3 (45.1) | 9.9 (49.8) | 13.1 (55.6) | 15.5 (59.9) | 17.7 (63.9) | 17.6 (63.7) | 14.9 (58.8) | 10.7 (51.3) | 7.1 (44.8) | 4.4 (39.9) | 10.6 (51.1) |
| Mean daily minimum °C (°F) | 2.2 (36.0) | 2.5 (36.5) | 4.1 (39.4) | 6.2 (43.2) | 9.2 (48.6) | 11.8 (53.2) | 13.6 (56.5) | 13.6 (56.5) | 11.1 (52.0) | 7.5 (45.5) | 4.3 (39.7) | 2.0 (35.6) | 7.3 (45.2) |
| Mean minimum °C (°F) | −5.1 (22.8) | −3.2 (26.2) | −1.4 (29.5) | 1.6 (34.9) | 4.5 (40.1) | 8.2 (46.8) | 10.2 (50.4) | 10.0 (50.0) | 6.4 (43.5) | 1.5 (34.7) | −2.4 (27.7) | −4.5 (23.9) | −7.6 (18.3) |
| Record low °C (°F) | −17.2 (1.0) | −15.6 (3.9) | −11.7 (10.9) | −3.3 (26.1) | −1.7 (28.9) | 1.7 (35.1) | 3.3 (37.9) | 3.9 (39.0) | 0.0 (32.0) | −5.6 (21.9) | −14.5 (5.9) | −20.0 (−4.0) | −20.0 (−4.0) |
| Record low wind chill | −22 | −13 | −11 | −2 | — | — | — | — | — | −3 | −16 | −20 | −22 |
| Average precipitation mm (inches) | 160.5 (6.32) | 84.4 (3.32) | 113.0 (4.45) | 76.7 (3.02) | 65.8 (2.59) | 47.6 (1.87) | 32.0 (1.26) | 31.4 (1.24) | 63.2 (2.49) | 124.7 (4.91) | 157.6 (6.20) | 141.9 (5.59) | 1,098.8 (43.26) |
| Average precipitation days (≥ 0.2 mm) | 19.2 | 14.4 | 19.1 | 14.6 | 11.9 | 11.6 | 7.4 | 6.9 | 10.2 | 17.6 | 18.7 | 18.8 | 170.4 |
| Average dew point °C (°F) | 2.4 (36.3) | 1.9 (35.4) | 3.6 (38.5) | 5.8 (42.4) | 9.0 (48.2) | 11.1 (52.0) | 13.3 (55.9) | 13.7 (56.7) | 11.9 (53.4) | 8.2 (46.8) | 4.7 (40.5) | 1.9 (35.4) | 7.3 (45.1) |
Source: weatherstats.ca

=== Historical ===
Historical climate data

==== Vancouver International Airport ====
===== 1971–2000 normals =====
Climate data for Vancouver International Airport (Sea Island, Richmond) (1971–2000)
| Month | Jan | Feb | Mar | Apr | May | Jun | Jul | Aug | Sep | Oct | Nov | Dec | Year |
|---|---|---|---|---|---|---|---|---|---|---|---|---|---|
| Mean daily maximum °C (°F) | 6.1 (43.0) | 8.0 (46.4) | 10.1 (50.2) | 13.1 (55.6) | 16.5 (61.7) | 19.2 (66.6) | 21.7 (71.1) | 21.9 (71.4) | 18.7 (65.7) | 13.5 (56.3) | 9.0 (48.2) | 6.2 (43.2) | 13.7 (56.7) |
| Daily mean °C (°F) | 3.3 (37.9) | 4.8 (40.6) | 6.6 (43.9) | 9.2 (48.6) | 12.5 (54.5) | 15.2 (59.4) | 17.5 (63.5) | 17.6 (63.7) | 14.6 (58.3) | 10.1 (50.2) | 6.0 (42.8) | 3.5 (38.3) | 10.1 (50.2) |
| Mean daily minimum °C (°F) | 0.5 (32.9) | 1.5 (34.7) | 3.1 (37.6) | 5.3 (41.5) | 8.4 (47.1) | 11.2 (52.2) | 13.2 (55.8) | 13.4 (56.1) | 10.5 (50.9) | 6.6 (43.9) | 3.1 (37.6) | 0.8 (33.4) | 6.5 (43.7) |
| Average precipitation mm (inches) | 153.6 (6.05) | 123.1 (4.85) | 114.3 (4.50) | 84.0 (3.31) | 67.9 (2.67) | 54.8 (2.16) | 39.6 (1.56) | 39.1 (1.54) | 53.5 (2.11) | 112.6 (4.43) | 181.0 (7.13) | 175.7 (6.92) | 1,199 (47.20) |
| Average rainfall mm (inches) | 139.1 (5.48) | 113.8 (4.48) | 111.8 (4.40) | 83.5 (3.29) | 67.9 (2.67) | 54.8 (2.16) | 39.6 (1.56) | 39.1 (1.54) | 53.5 (2.11) | 112.5 (4.43) | 178.5 (7.03) | 160.6 (6.32) | 1,154.7 (45.46) |
| Average snowfall cm (inches) | 16.6 (6.5) | 9.6 (3.8) | 2.6 (1.0) | 0.4 (0.2) | 0.0 (0.0) | 0.0 (0.0) | 0.0 (0.0) | 0.0 (0.0) | 0.0 (0.0) | 0.1 (0.0) | 2.5 (1.0) | 16.3 (6.4) | 48.2 (19.0) |
| Average precipitation days (≥ 0.2 mm) | 18.5 | 16.3 | 17.0 | 13.9 | 13.0 | 11.2 | 6.9 | 6.8 | 8.6 | 14.3 | 19.7 | 19.8 | 166.1 |
| Average rainy days (≥ 0.2 mm) | 16.9 | 15.4 | 16.7 | 13.9 | 13.0 | 11.2 | 6.9 | 6.8 | 8.6 | 14.2 | 19.5 | 18.2 | 161.3 |
| Average snowy days (≥ 0.2 cm) | 3.7 | 1.9 | 0.9 | 0.2 | 0.0 | 0.0 | 0.0 | 0.0 | 0.0 | 0.1 | 0.8 | 3.3 | 10.9 |
Source: Environment and Climate Change Canada

===== 1941–1970 normals =====
Climate data for Vancouver International Airport (Sea Island, Richmond) (1941–1970)
| Month | Jan | Feb | Mar | Apr | May | Jun | Jul | Aug | Sep | Oct | Nov | Dec | Year |
|---|---|---|---|---|---|---|---|---|---|---|---|---|---|
| Mean daily maximum °C (°F) | 5.2 (41.4) | 7.7 (45.9) | 9.6 (49.3) | 12.9 (55.2) | 16.8 (62.2) | 19.6 (67.3) | 22.2 (72.0) | 21.6 (70.9) | 18.5 (65.3) | 13.7 (56.7) | 9.2 (48.6) | 6.6 (43.9) | 13.6 (56.5) |
| Daily mean °C (°F) | 2.4 (36.3) | 4.4 (39.9) | 5.8 (42.4) | 8.9 (48.0) | 12.4 (54.3) | 15.3 (59.5) | 17.4 (63.3) | 17.1 (62.8) | 14.2 (57.6) | 10.1 (50.2) | 6.1 (43.0) | 3.8 (38.8) | 9.8 (49.6) |
| Mean daily minimum °C (°F) | −0.4 (31.3) | 1.1 (34.0) | 2.1 (35.8) | 4.9 (40.8) | 7.9 (46.2) | 10.9 (51.6) | 12.7 (54.9) | 12.5 (54.5) | 9.9 (49.8) | 6.4 (43.5) | 2.9 (37.2) | 1.1 (34.0) | 6.0 (42.8) |
| Average precipitation mm (inches) | 147.3 (5.80) | 116.6 (4.59) | 93.7 (3.69) | 61.0 (2.40) | 47.5 (1.87) | 45.2 (1.78) | 29.7 (1.17) | 37.1 (1.46) | 61.2 (2.41) | 122.2 (4.81) | 141.2 (5.56) | 165.4 (6.51) | 1,068.1 (42.05) |
| Average rainfall mm (inches) | 125.7 (4.95) | 109.0 (4.29) | 89.2 (3.51) | 60.7 (2.39) | 47.5 (1.87) | 45.2 (1.78) | 29.7 (1.17) | 37.1 (1.46) | 61.2 (2.41) | 122.2 (4.81) | 138.9 (5.47) | 151.4 (5.96) | 1,017.8 (40.07) |
| Average snowfall cm (inches) | 22.4 (8.8) | 7.9 (3.1) | 5.3 (2.1) | 0.1 (0.0) | 0.0 (0.0) | 0.0 (0.0) | 0.0 (0.0) | 0.0 (0.0) | 0.0 (0.0) | 0.0 (0.0) | 2.3 (0.9) | 14.5 (5.7) | 52.3 (20.6) |
Source: Environment and Climate Change Canada

==== Vancouver Harbour ====
===== 1971–2000 normals =====
Climate data for Vancouver Harbour CS (1971–2000)
| Month | Jan | Feb | Mar | Apr | May | Jun | Jul | Aug | Sep | Oct | Nov | Dec | Year |
|---|---|---|---|---|---|---|---|---|---|---|---|---|---|
| Mean daily maximum °C (°F) | 6.8 (44.2) | 8.4 (47.1) | 10.6 (51.1) | 13.5 (56.3) | 16.8 (62.2) | 19.6 (67.3) | 22.0 (71.6) | 22.3 (72.1) | 19.0 (66.2) | 13.9 (57.0) | 9.3 (48.7) | 6.8 (44.2) | 14.1 (57.4) |
| Daily mean °C (°F) | 4.8 (40.6) | 5.9 (42.6) | 7.6 (45.7) | 10.0 (50.0) | 13.2 (55.8) | 15.9 (60.6) | 18.1 (64.6) | 18.3 (64.9) | 15.4 (59.7) | 11.1 (52.0) | 7.1 (44.8) | 4.8 (40.6) | 11.0 (51.8) |
| Mean daily minimum °C (°F) | 2.7 (36.9) | 3.4 (38.1) | 4.6 (40.3) | 6.5 (43.7) | 9.5 (49.1) | 12.2 (54.0) | 14.1 (57.4) | 14.4 (57.9) | 11.6 (52.9) | 8.2 (46.8) | 4.8 (40.6) | 2.8 (37.0) | 7.9 (46.2) |
| Average precipitation mm (inches) | 178.8 (7.04) | 183.8 (7.24) | 155.8 (6.13) | 117.9 (4.64) | 86.7 (3.41) | 69.9 (2.75) | 53.4 (2.10) | 50.8 (2.00) | 73.3 (2.89) | 147.8 (5.82) | 239.2 (9.42) | 231.3 (9.11) | 1,588.6 (62.54) |
| Average rainfall mm (inches) | 143.6 (5.65) | 173.5 (6.83) | 153.1 (6.03) | 117.0 (4.61) | 86.7 (3.41) | 69.9 (2.75) | 49.1 (1.93) | 48.3 (1.90) | 71.0 (2.80) | 131.9 (5.19) | 219.5 (8.64) | 211.5 (8.33) | 1,474.9 (58.07) |
| Average snowfall cm (inches) | 15.3 (6.0) | 10.2 (4.0) | 2.7 (1.1) | 0.9 (0.4) | 0.0 (0.0) | 0.0 (0.0) | 0.0 (0.0) | 0.0 (0.0) | 0.0 (0.0) | 0.0 (0.0) | 2.7 (1.1) | 11.8 (4.6) | 43.6 (17.2) |
| Average precipitation days (≥ 0.2 mm) | 18.3 | 16.4 | 16.6 | 14.9 | 12.9 | 11.6 | 7.6 | 7.7 | 9.4 | 14.9 | 19.8 | 19.1 | 169.1 |
| Average rainy days (≥ 0.2 mm) | 14.8 | 16.3 | 15.9 | 14.2 | 13.2 | 10.7 | 7.6 | 7.7 | 9.8 | 12.0 | 16.8 | 16.2 | 154.5 |
| Average snowy days (≥ 0.2 cm) | 2.8 | 1.9 | 0.89 | 0.24 | 0.0 | 0.0 | 0.0 | 0.0 | 0.0 | 0.05 | 0.88 | 2.9 | 9.6 |
Source: Environment and Climate Change Canada

===== 1951–1980 normals =====
Climate data for Vancouver Harbour CS (1951–1980)
| Month | Jan | Feb | Mar | Apr | May | Jun | Jul | Aug | Sep | Oct | Nov | Dec | Year |
|---|---|---|---|---|---|---|---|---|---|---|---|---|---|
| Mean daily maximum °C (°F) | 5.1 (41.2) | 7.7 (45.9) | 9.3 (48.7) | 13.0 (55.4) | 15.9 (60.6) | 19.0 (66.2) | 21.9 (71.4) | 21.6 (70.9) | 18.3 (64.9) | 13.7 (56.7) | 8.9 (48.0) | 6.8 (44.2) | 13.4 (56.1) |
| Daily mean °C (°F) | 3.4 (38.1) | 5.2 (41.4) | 6.1 (43.0) | 9.3 (48.7) | 12.5 (54.5) | 15.3 (59.5) | 17.6 (63.7) | 17.2 (63.0) | 14.6 (58.3) | 10.7 (51.3) | 6.8 (44.2) | 4.7 (40.5) | 10.3 (50.5) |
| Mean daily minimum °C (°F) | 1.2 (34.2) | 2.8 (37.0) | 3.6 (38.5) | 5.9 (42.6) | 8.5 (47.3) | 11.1 (52.0) | 13.3 (55.9) | 13.6 (56.5) | 11.0 (51.8) | 7.7 (45.9) | 4.2 (39.6) | 2.4 (36.3) | 7.1 (44.8) |
| Average precipitation mm (inches) | 217.8 (8.57) | 155.7 (6.13) | 152.8 (6.02) | 91.2 (3.59) | 68.4 (2.69) | 62.7 (2.47) | 42.7 (1.68) | 54.5 (2.15) | 78.9 (3.11) | 159.3 (6.27) | 213.7 (8.41) | 242.6 (9.55) | 1,540.3 (60.64) |
| Average rainfall mm (inches) | 193.1 (7.60) | 146.7 (5.78) | 146.2 (5.76) | 91 (3.6) | 68.4 (2.69) | 62.7 (2.47) | 42.7 (1.68) | 54.5 (2.15) | 78.9 (3.11) | 159.3 (6.27) | 210.9 (8.30) | 227.9 (8.97) | 1,482.3 (58.36) |
| Average snowfall cm (inches) | 26.5 (10.4) | 9.5 (3.7) | 6.4 (2.5) | 0.2 (0.1) | 0.0 (0.0) | 0.0 (0.0) | 0.0 (0.0) | 0.0 (0.0) | 0.0 (0.0) | 0.0 (0.0) | 2.6 (1.0) | 14.8 (5.8) | 60.0 (23.6) |
Source: Environment and Climate Change Canada
