= Kate Fleming =

American actress (1965–2006)

- Born: October 6, 1965; Arlington, Virginia, U.S.
- Died: December 14, 2006 (aged 41); Seattle, Washington, U.S.
- Occupations: Actress, artist, singer, audiobook narrator, producer
- Years active: 1993–2006
- Spouse: Charlene Strong (m. 1997)

Kathryn Ann Fleming (October 6, 1965 – December 14, 2006) was an American actress, artist, singer, and audiobook narrator and producer. She was the owner and executive producer at Cedar House Audio, an audio production company specializing in spoken word, that is located in Seattle, Washington. She is also known for voicing Princess Daisy in the first Mario tennis game for Nintendo 64.

== Early life and education ==
Fleming was born in Arlington, Virginia in 1965. She grew up in the Washington, D.C. area and graduated from the College of William and Mary in 1987 (Bachelor of Arts, Religion). Fleming studied at the Actors Theatre of Louisville, Kentucky, and was an alumna of the 1987/1988 Apprentice Company.

== Work ==
After a stint as a professional actor, she branched into audiobooks in the mid-1990s. Fleming recorded well over 200 titles, many under the stage name Anna Fields.

In 2004, Fleming won the Audie Award for Unabridged Fiction for her performance of Ruth Ozeki's All Over Creation. In a July 1, 2005 interview with the William & Mary Alumni Association, Fleming noted several of her favorite narration projects: Bel Canto by Ann Patchett, The Falls by Joyce Carol Oates, Baker Towers by Jennifer Haigh, and "any title" by Louise Erdrich. In addition to her work on audiobooks, she also narrated the Military Channel's six-episode series Navy Seals, which chronicled the six-month basic training process for US Navy Seals in 2001. Another military-themed narration was for the Discovery Channel documentary Secrets of the Stealth: Nighthawk, on the F-117 Nighthawk, the US Air Force's first stealth plane, and its crucial role in winning the first Gulf War.

== Death ==
Fleming was killed when she was trapped inside the flooded basement of her Madison Valley studio during the Hanukkah Eve windstorm of 2006. She is survived by her wife and partner of nine years, Charlene Strong. At the hospital, Strong was denied access to see Fleming until permission was granted by an out-of-state relative. The experience led Strong to advocate for legislation that was eventually passed as Washington's domestic partnership law.

After Fleming's death, the City of Seattle commissioned a report to determine the cause of flash flooding in Fleming's neighborhood. As of 2013, the house where Fleming died had been replaced by a garden, and the city had completed a stormwater project in the neighborhood. The project features a reservoir capable of holding excess storm runoff when the rest of the system is over capacity. A memorial at the site is inscribed with words that Fleming would say before going on stage as an actress: "Be a light. Be a flame. Be a beacon."

== Filmography ==
=== Film ===
Year	Title	Role	Notes
1993	Hard Candy	Teacher	Film short
2001	Navy SEALs: BUDS Class 234	Narrator	Educational
2006	In the Shadow of the Himalayas: How People Live in Nepal	Narrator	Educational Short

=== Video games ===
Year	Title	Role
1999	Freddi Fish 4: The Case of the Hogfish Rustlers of Briny Gulch	Calico Catfish, Fluke
1999	Mario Golf	Azalea
2000	Mario Tennis	Princess Daisy
