= Bridle Trails, Washington =

Community in Bellveue, Washington

Coordinates: 47°39′18.7″N 122°11′8.2″W

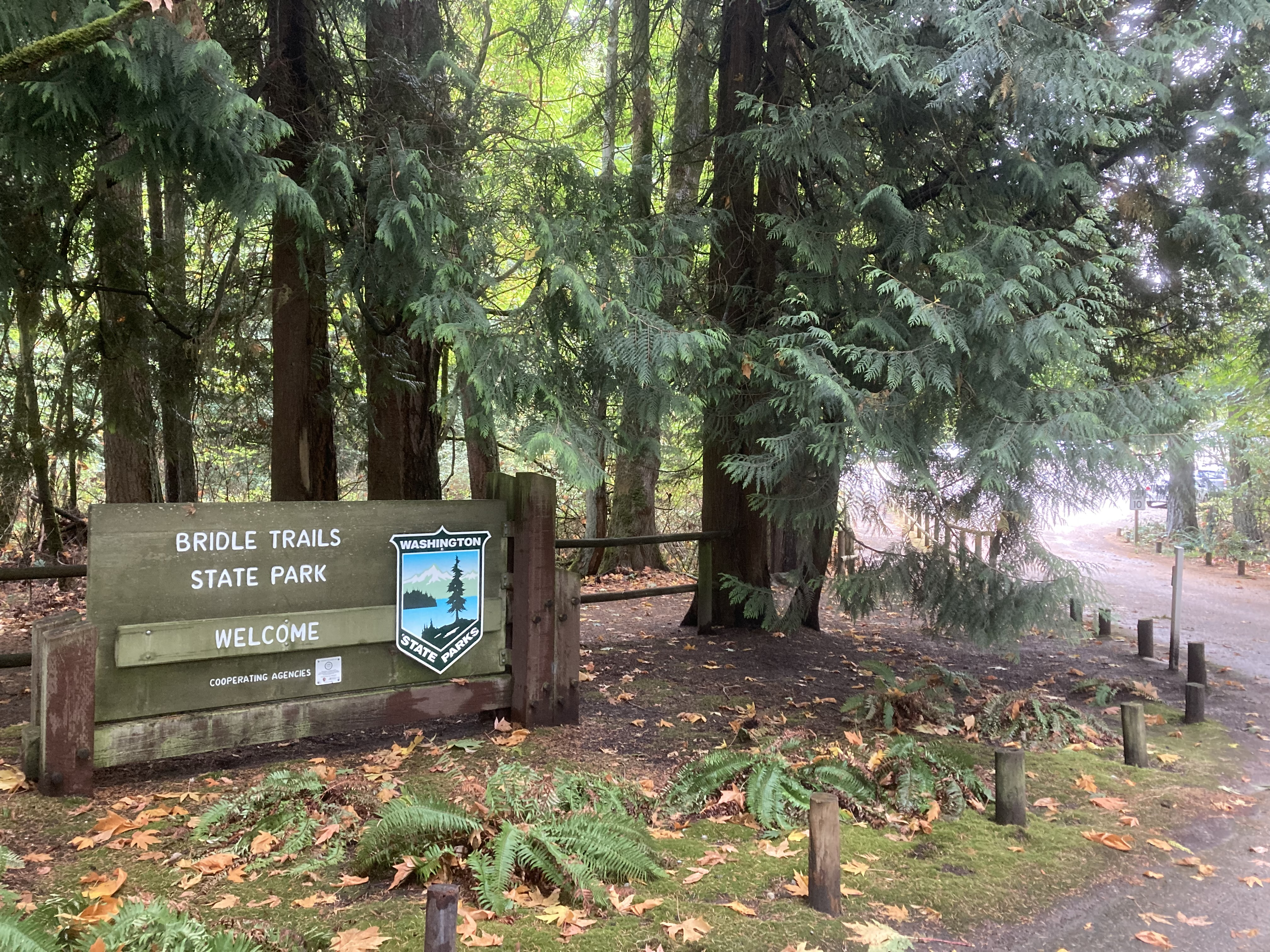
Entrance to Bridle Trails State Park

The Bridle Trails neighborhood can refer to a neighborhood which intersects with the following cities: Bellevue, Washington; Kirkland, Washington; or Redmond, Washington. It is so named for being adjacent to Bridle Trails State Park. Many of the properties in these neighborhoods have equestrian facilities such as barns and pastures.
