= Bridle Trails State Park =

State park in the U.S. state of Washington

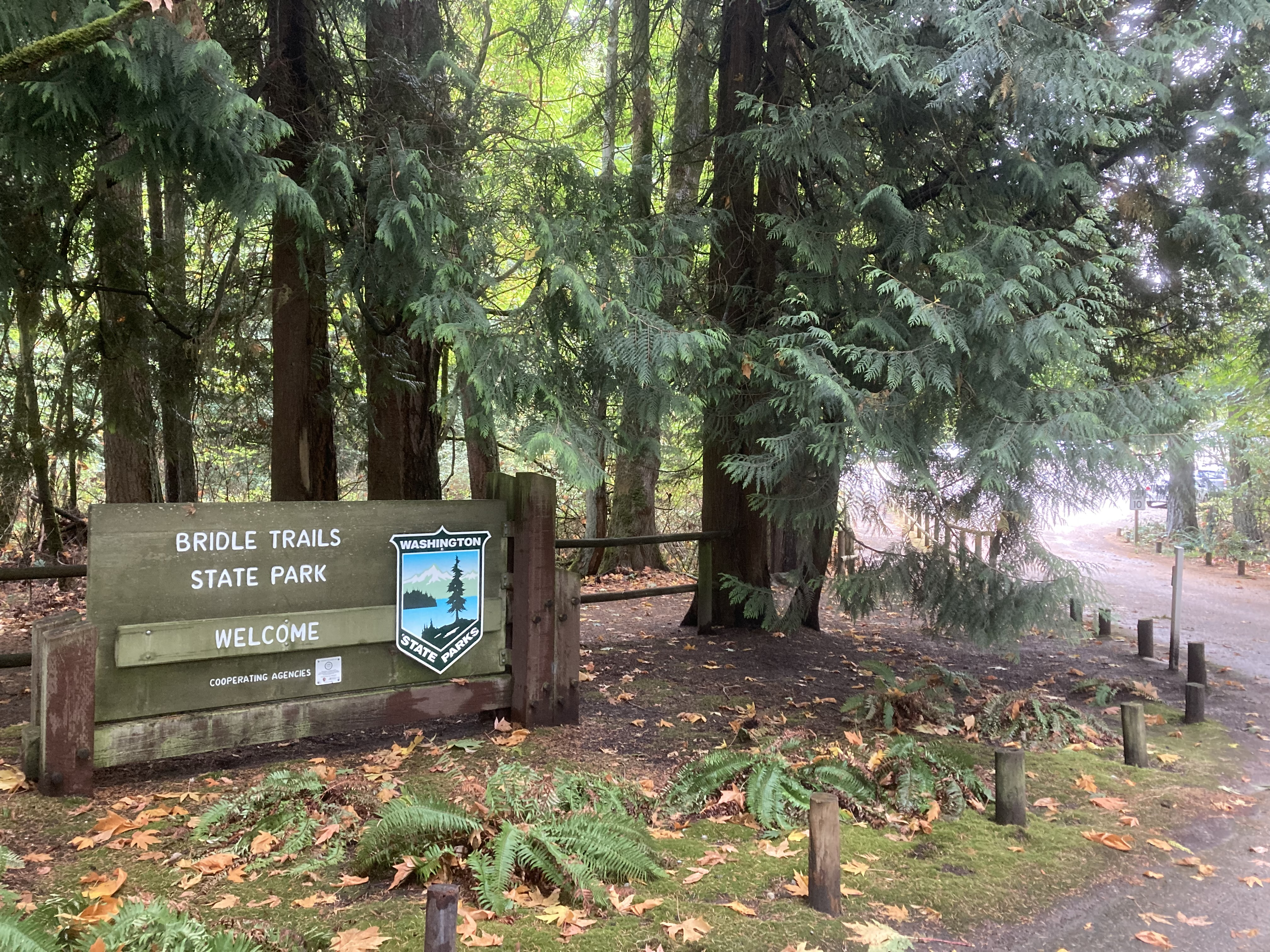
- The entrance to the park at 116th Avenue NE

- Location within Washington (state) Location within the United States
- Interactive map of Bridle Trails State Park
- Location: King County, Washington, United States
- Coordinates: 47°39′12″N 122°10′25″W
- Area: 489 acres (198 ha)
- Elevation: 509 ft (155 m)
- Established: 1932
- Administrator: Washington State Parks and Recreation Commission
- Website: Official website

Bridle Trails State Park is a 489-acre (198 ha) public recreation area in the Bridle Trails neighborhood in an unincorporated part of the Eastside area of King County, Washington. Established in 1932 and developed in 1933 by the Civil Works Administration, primary features of the state park include a forested trail system shared by pedestrians and equestrians and an outdoor arena used for equestrian purposes.

== Description ==
Just outside the city of Redmond, Bridle Trails State Park borders the Eastside cities of Kirkland to the north and west and Bellevue to the south and east. It is bounded by 116th Avenue NE and I-405 to the west, NE 60th Street to the north, 132nd Avenue NE to the east, and suburban housing to the south. The primary entry point to the park is off of 116th Avenue NE, where a parking lot for Discover Pass holders allows access to the park's trailhead for drivers. The park is home to one of Kirkland's two water reservoirs, the 11,200,000 US gallons (42,000 m^{3}) capacity South Reservoir.

== History ==
The area around modern-day Bellevue and Kirkland was first inhabited by several indigenous Coast Salish groups, among which were the Duwamish. A small branch known as "the lake people" (properly known as: "Tabtabiux") lived on the east side of Lake Washington. Much of the land included in the park was set aside "for the purpose of being applied to common schools" when Washington Territory was created in 1853. Initially, timber sales were used from the park in order to support local public schools. That land became a state park in 1932 after efforts of local advocates, primarily from different equestrian communities. During this time there were around 3,500 horses in and around Bellevue; a formal horse-riding group called the Lake Washington Saddle Club was formed during this period. Workers with the Civil Works Administration cleared brush, burned logging debris, built trails and fences, and other efforts in initial park development. The Bridle Trails Park Foundation was established in 2002 to pay half the cost of park operations after funding from the state was reduced. This payment was the result of an agreement with the state government, who would be required to keep the park open and undeveloped for 40 years starting in 2003.

Originally the park was surrounded by properties with stables, but suburbanization has increased the density of nearby residential housing. This change has resulted in conflict between pedestrians, particularly those accompanied by dogs, and horse riders within the park. In 2015, a spooked horse ran from the trail and was struck by a motor vehicle, resulting in the animal's euthanization.

== Activities and amenities ==
The park offers an unpaved 28-mile (45 km) trail system for horseback riding and hiking through thick forests, contrasting the suburban setting immediately surrounding the park and the dense urban setting of nearby Downtown Bellevue. It incorporates a lowland forest, with the majority of trees being Douglas firs and Western hemlocks. The main pathways of Bridle Trails include the 3.7-mile-long (6.0 km) Coyote Trail that forms a loop around the park, the 0.97-mile-long (1.56 km) Raven Trail, and the 1.16-mile-long (1.87 km) Trillium Trail. The 2.13-mile-long (3.43 km) Bridle Crest Trail provides bicycle and pedestrian access between the park and Marymoor Park, the trailhead for the Sammamish River Trail in Redmond. This connection to Marymoor Park links Bridle Trails State Park to other parks included in the Mountains to Sound Greenway. Four outdoor arenas are used for equestrian shows. The park has an area with picnic tables, restroom, water fountain, and barbeque pit.

=== Restrictions ===
Cycling, camping, and off-leash dogs are not permitted within the park. Pedestrians are required to yield just off of the trail to passing equestrian traffic. The park is closed after dusk and opens at 6:30 a.m. most of the year. During the winter, most of the park opens at 8:00 a.m., but some areas close entirely for the season. Residents have reported sightings of a black bear leaving the state park annually during the summer season.

== See also ==
- List of Washington state parks
- Saint Edward State Park
- Lake Sammamish State Park
