= Hanukkah Eve windstorm of 2006 =

Weather event in the Pacific Northwest

- Satellite image of the storm intensifying off the coast of the Pacific Northwest, on December 14, 2006.

Meteorological history
- Formed: December 13, 2006
- Dissipated: December 17, 2006

Extratropical cyclone
- Highest winds: 74 mph (119 km/h) at Hood Canal Bridge
- Highest gusts: 114 mph (183 km/h) at Mt. Hebo, Oregon
- Lowest pressure: 970 hPa (mbar); 28.64 inHg

Overall effects
- Casualties: 18
- Damage: US$267 million+ in US ($426 million in 2025 dollars); CA$89 million+ in Canada ($134 million in 2025 dollars)
- Areas affected: Washington, Oregon, Idaho, Vancouver Island, Southern British Columbia, central Canada
- Power outages: ~1.8 million

The Hanukkah Eve windstorm of 2006 was a powerful Pacific Northwest windstorm in the Pacific Northwest region of the United States and southern British Columbia, Canada between December 13, 2006, and December 15, 2006. The storm produced hurricane-force wind gusts and heavy rainfall, causing hundreds of millions of dollars in damage and leaving over 1.8 million residences and businesses without power. Eighteen people were killed, many of whom died of carbon monoxide poisoning in the days following the storm because of improper use of barbecue cookers and generators indoors. The name of the storm was chosen in a contest run by the National Weather Service (NWS) office in Seattle from about 8,000 entries.

== Impact ==
=== Washington ===
Map plotting the storm's track and intensity, according to the Saffir–Simpson scale Map key Saffir–Simpson scale Tropical depression (≤38 mph, ≤62 km/h) Tropical storm (39–73 mph, 63–118 km/h) Category 1 (74–95 mph, 119–153 km/h) Category 2 (96–110 mph, 154–177 km/h) Category 3 (111–129 mph, 178–208 km/h) Category 4 (130–156 mph, 209–251 km/h) Category 5 (≥157 mph, ≥252 km/h) Unknown Storm type Tropical cyclone Subtropical cyclone Extratropical cyclone, remnant low, tropical disturbance, or monsoon depression

The storm left extensive devastation across Washington, especially tree damage, which knocked down numerous power lines. Fallen trees also led to several road closures, including a section of I-5 near Chehalis. For the first time in its history, the Tacoma Narrows Bridge was closed. Seattle-Tacoma International Airport partially lost power, canceling most flights. Flooding was also reported in low-lying areas from the heavy rain.

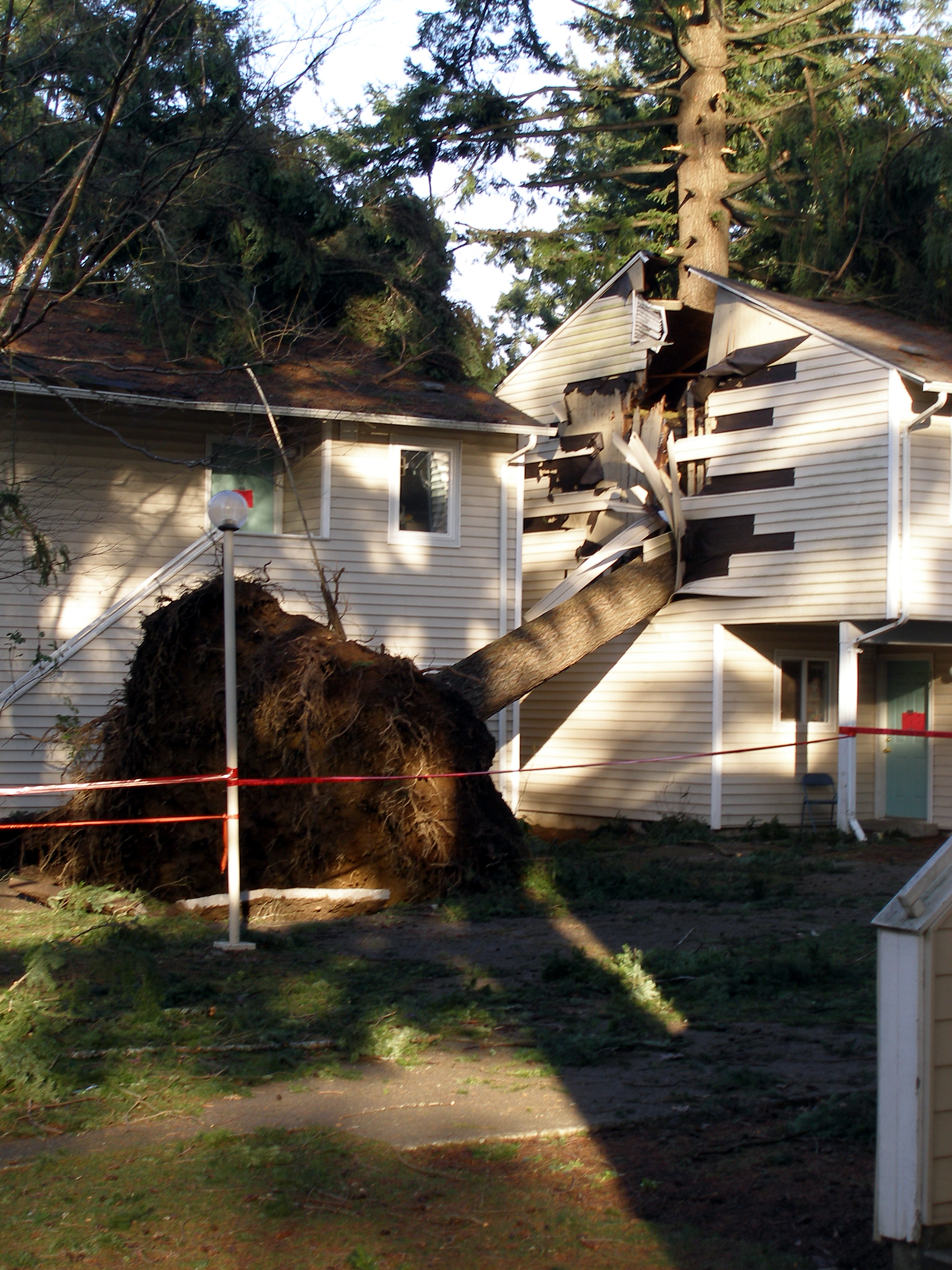
Storm damage at an Olympia, Washington apartment complex

The electricity grid was hit very hard, as about 1.2 million customers lost power in the state, and Puget Sound Energy (PSE) reported that more than 75% of its circuits were damaged. Municipal utilities also suffered severe damage. In the Seattle area, hundreds of thousands of families still remained without power several days after the storm, and many had to leave their homes and move into hotels or emergency shelters coping with the inclement weather. Major employers in the area were affected; the power outage forced Microsoft to shut down large portions of its campus in Redmond on December 15.

The Seattle School District and many surrounding districts closed, marking the first time Seattle schools were closed for a weather-related reason other than snow.

It was described as the worst storm to hit the region since the Inauguration Day storm of January 20, 1993.

==== Deaths ====
Fourteen people were killed in Western Washington. One of them was 41-year-old voice actress Kate Fleming (aka Anna Fields) who was trapped in a flooded basement in Seattle's Madison Valley. In Grays Harbor County, Markus Stickles was killed by a tree that fell into his home in McCleary. In Gig Harbor, Washington, Pritchard Miller and his dog were electrocuted after stepping on a downed power line. In Pierce County, two motorists were hit by falling trees. Eatonville resident Harold Fox, 47, was killed while trying to avoid a fallen tree south of Spanaway. Near McKenna, 37-year-old Roy resident Bonnie Bacus died as the result of a tree falling onto the cab of a truck, in which she was a passenger; her husband, who was driving the truck, died three months later. Steven Thielen died in Spanaway as a result of a house fire caused by the use of candles for light.

Eight deaths occurred as a result of carbon monoxide poisoning. Five of those were members of a single Burien family. Adam Butcher, his wife Jackie Harris, and two sons, Jason Shane Butcher, 14 and Raymond Zachary Butcher, 21, died of asphyxiation because of a generator running in a closed garage attached to their home. Another son, Rick Taylor Butcher, 24, died in a hospital on January 20, 2007, as a result of his injuries. Alejandro Nava-Solis of Kirkland, Juan Figueroa-Gomez of Renton, and Shah Fazli of Kenmore were also among the carbon monoxide deaths.

==== Newspapers ====
For the first time in 70 years, on December 15 the Seattle Post-Intelligencer was not able to publish copies of its newspaper. As a result of a power outage at a printing plant in Bothell, the Seattle Times was only able to publish 13,000 copies of its Friday edition.

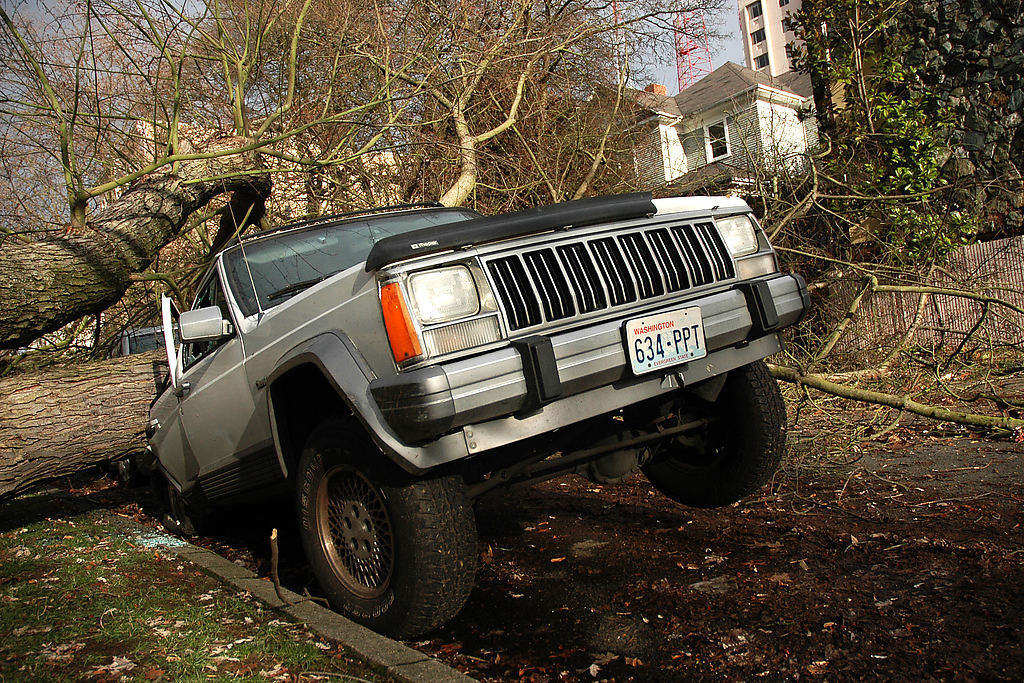
Wind damage in the Capitol Hill neighborhood in Seattle

The following day, both newspapers had to be printed by The News Tribune of Tacoma by virtue of an agreement to use each others' printing presses during emergencies.

For its December 20 edition, the Seattle Times put carbon monoxide warnings on its front page in English, Spanish, Chinese, Vietnamese, Somali, and Russian to get the word out to the immigrant community about the dangers of carbon monoxide in light of recent deaths.

==== State of Emergency and recovery ====
On December 18, Washington Governor Christine Gregoire declared a State of Emergency in Western Washington as a result of the damages. On January 11, the Governor requested a federal disaster declaration and on February 14, the declaration was approved by President Bush.

==== Air quality ====
In the wake of the storm, the quality of air deteriorated due to the increased use of wood stoves and fireplaces while the air was stagnant.

==== Contributing factors ====
Just previous to the windstorm, Seattle set a new record for rainfall in a single month with nearly 16 inches (410 mm) of rain falling in November 2006, much of it from a series of Pineapple Express rain storms in the first week of the month. Combined with several days of snow and ice later in the month, and continuing rain throughout the first half of December 2006, the ground in the Puget Sound region was extremely waterlogged and loose.

Additionally, large portions of the planted trees in the Seattle metropolitan area were at the end of their lifespan, being some 60 to 70 years of age or more. To compound this, many tree species had shallow root systems that did not extend past the waterlogged soil.

The result of these factors was that many thousands of large, old trees easily uprooted and tipped over, frequently with tons of mud captured in their roots, and crashed into homes and power lines.

The major tree loss in old growth areas was at borders where more recent logging has occurred. Forest cover holds together as a group during strong winds and these cuts into the original areas created open edges for trees to be hit horizontally by wind.

=== Oregon ===
The high winds also left damage in Oregon. Extensive tree damage was reported, some of which fell on houses or on power lines. More than 350,000 customers lost power at the peak of the storm. Shelters were opened in the coastal regions as a result of the storm damage. Governor Ted Kulongoski requested a federal disaster declaration on January 31, 2007.

Two people were killed due to a house fire in Seaside during a power outage. The severe weather also hampered the rescue efforts of three missing climbers on Mount Hood; one climber was later found dead and the other two are missing and presumed dead. On the Oregon Coast, three sailors hired to sail a catamaran from South Africa to Seattle went missing. The 50 ft (15 m) boat was found overturned on a beach near Lincoln City the morning of December 15. The crew was last seen leaving San Francisco on December 8. The search for the three sailors was called off on the afternoon of December 16.

Animation of Hanukkah Eve Storm approaching the West Coast of North America

=== British Columbia ===
For British Columbia, the storm followed several others that occurred in the preceding weeks. The most high-profile damage caused by the storm was the breaking and uprooting of around 10,000 trees in Stanley Park in downtown Vancouver. In addition to Stanley Park, extensive damage was reported to trees around the Lower Mainland, which also took power lines down with them as well as a number of houses, notably on exposed areas of West Vancouver facing west over Howe Sound. BC Ferries service was disrupted along the coast, along with other transit disruption, closed roads, and closed schools. At its peak, BC Hydro reported that over 250,000 customers were without power.

An elderly couple died of asphyxiation as a result of carbon monoxide poisoning in Burnaby.

== Total damage ==
Washington and Oregon suffered a total of $220 million ($279,988,194.44 in 2019) in insured damage according to the Northwest Insurance Council. Washington suffered $170 million in damage and Oregon $50 million. $47 million in damage to public property resulted from the windstorm in Washington state with "several million dollars in damage" to public property in Oregon.

In British Columbia, insured damage was expected to reach $80 million and at Vancouver's Stanley Park repairs were expected to cost $9 million because of numerous fallen trees and damage to the seawall.

== Post-storm controversy ==
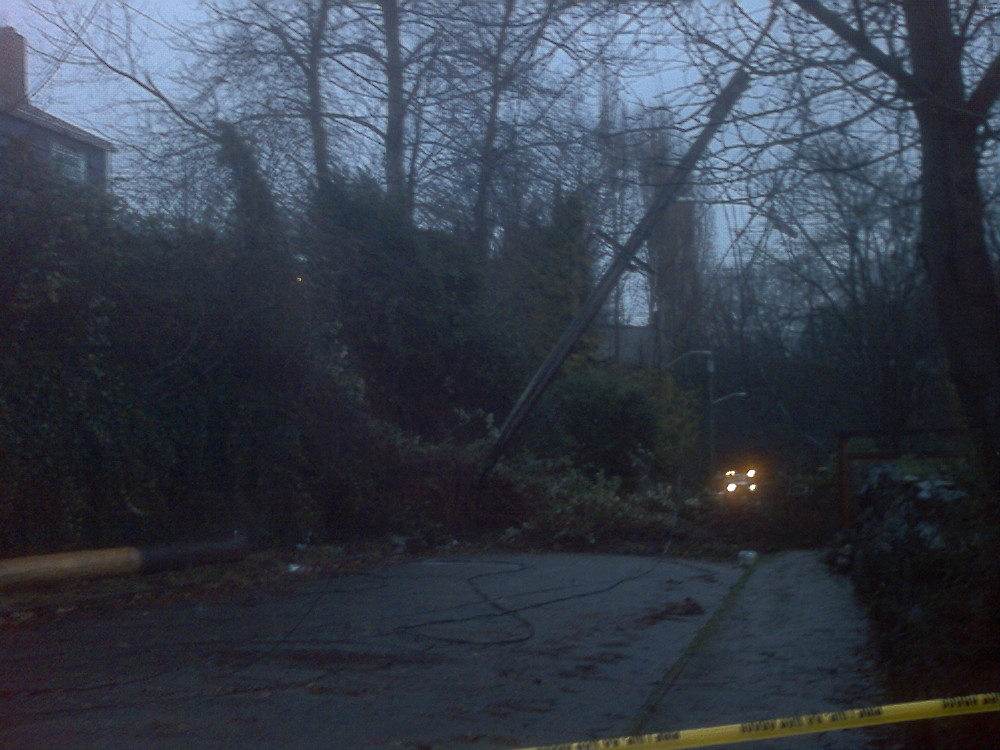
Landslide in the Madison Valley neighborhood of Seattle

Soon after the windstorm, controversy began in Seattle over the drowning death of Kate Fleming as well as the issue of possible problems with storm water drainage which some believe may have led to her death and the flood damage of several homes on the evening of December 14. Seattle received 0.86 inches (22 mm) of rain between 4 p.m. and 5 p.m., leading to major urban flooding. A city report released on February 27, 2007 stated that sweeping changes were necessary in emergency response services to better mitigate the effects of a natural disaster on the city, such as the establishment of a 311 hot line for non-emergency calls, the installment of emergency generators in every fire station in the city and reconsideration of relying on builders to ensure that storm drains aren't clogged by sediment filters.

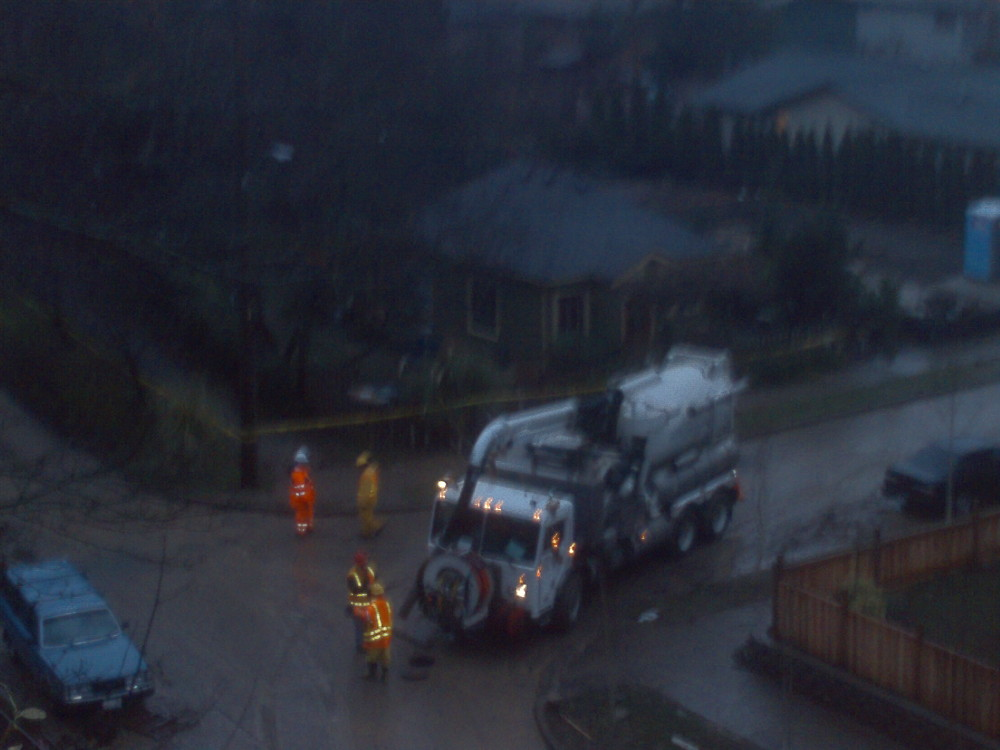
Home of Kate Fleming, killed in the storm

The flooding which led to the death of Fleming was investigated by Denver-based engineering firm CH2M Hill on behalf of the City of Seattle. In its report, released in April 2007, investigators identified several factors, including an unprecedented and unanticipated amount of rainfall, the failure of a nearby retaining wall, and the inadequate design of the drainage system around Fleming's home.

== Peak wind gusts ==
Wind gusts were as high as 70 to 100 mph or more in some locations along the Washington and Oregon coasts, as well as the mountains. Interior locations of Puget Sound and Willamette Valley had gusts in the 50-80 mph+ range. The Seattle–Tacoma International Airport reached a wind-speed record of 69 mph; the mark would remain the historic high at the airfield as of 2016.

In addition to the wind, record-breaking rainfall fell in Seattle with nearly an inch in a one-hour period the afternoon of December 14. Such a rainfall event is only expected in Seattle an average of once every 99 years.

== See also ==
- Global storm activity of 2006
- 2006 storms in Vancouver
- Great Gale of 1880
- Columbus Day Storm of 1962
- South Valley Surprise of 2002
- Great Coastal Gale of 2007
- December 2008 North American snowstorms
- January 2012 Pacific Northwest snowstorm
- October 2021 Northeast Pacific bomb cyclone
- November 2024 Northeast Pacific bomb cyclone
