= Coldwater Lake (Washington) =

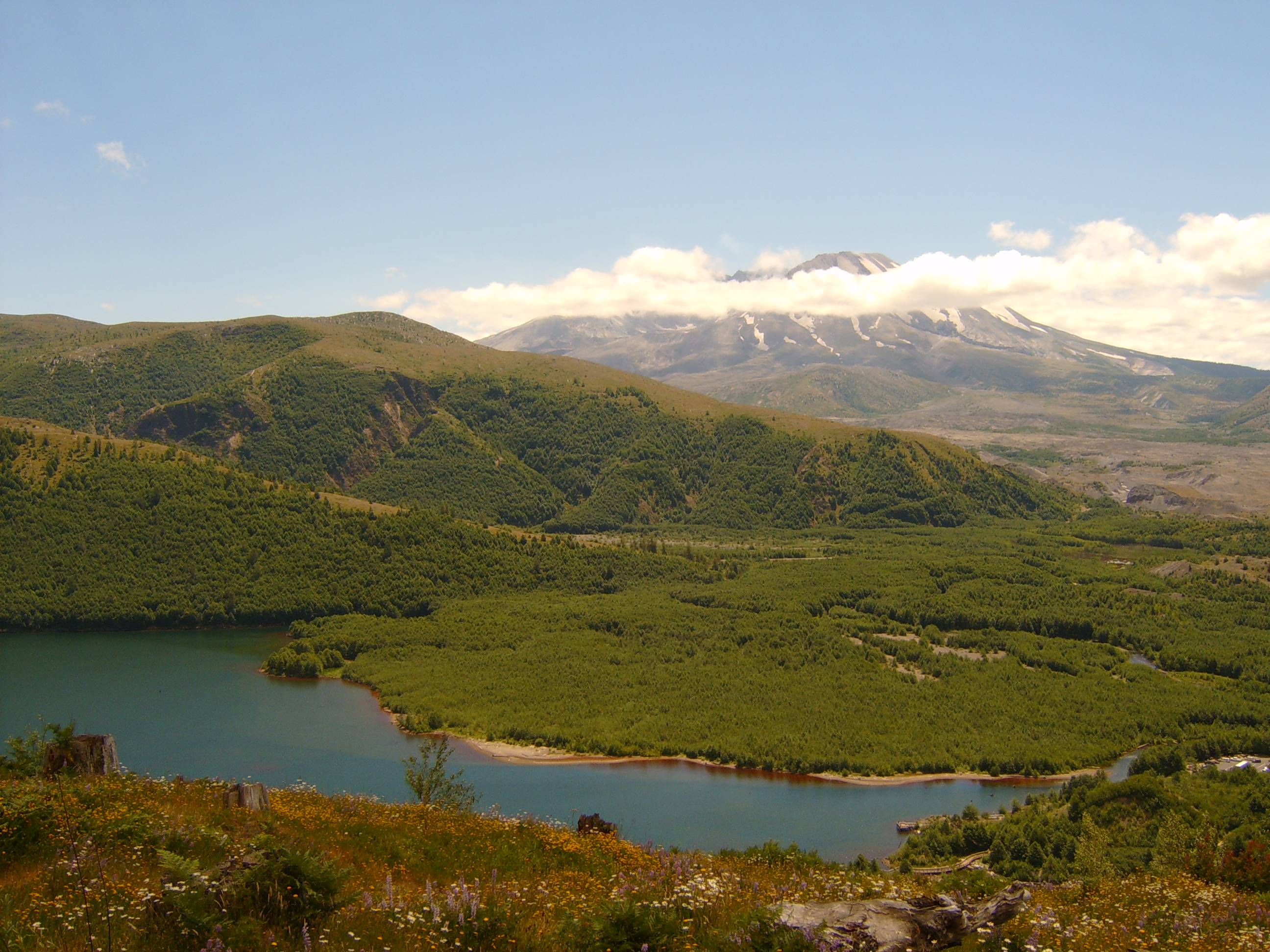
- Coldwater Lake is seen here from the Coldwater Ridge Visitor Center. Mount St. Helens is in the background.

- Location of Coldwater Lake in Washington
- Location: Washington, U.S.
- Coordinates: 46.304°N 122.237°W
- Type: Landslide-dammed lake
- Primary inflows: Coldwater Creek; South Coldwater Creek
- Primary outflows: Coldwater Creek
- Catchment area: 16.55 mi^{2} (42.9 km^{2})
- Basin countries: United States
- First flooded: May 18, 1980
- Max. length: 5 mi (8 km)
- Max. width: 0.5 mi (0.8 km)
- Surface area: 773.2 acres (312.9 ha)
- Average depth: 87 ft (27 m)
- Max. depth: 180 ft (55 m)
- Water volume: 67,300 acre⋅ft (83,000,000 m^{3})
- Surface elevation: 2,503 ft (763 m)
- Islands: Kim Island is the only permanent island, sutuated toward the west end of the lake. There are a few very shallow areas that break the surface depending on water levels.

Coldwater Lake is a barrier lake on the border of Cowlitz County and Skamania County, Washington in the United States. The lake was created during the 1980 eruption of Mount St. Helens, which blocked its natural outlet, Coldwater Creek, with volcanic debris. It is one of several lakes in the area that were created or otherwise enlarged by the eruption.

== Geography ==
The lake runs from northeast to southwest, with the west end in Cowlitz County and the east end in Skamania County. The portion of the lake in Skamania County is part of Gifford Pinchot National Forest. Coldwater Creek drains the lake on its southwest end and flows into the North Fork of the Toutle River, a tributary of the Cowlitz River, in turn a tributary of the Columbia River. Coldwater Lake is located 8 miles (13 km) north of Mount St. Helens, 5 miles (8 km) west of Spirit Lake. Castle Lake, formed in the same manner as Coldwater Lake during the 1980 eruption, is located about 3 miles (4.8 km) to the south. The area is about 50 miles (80 km) northeast of Longview and 100 miles (160 km) north of Portland, Oregon.

Coldwater is a ribbon lake, occupying the trough of a glacial valley. The surrounding ridges rise dramatically to heights of more than 1,000 feet (300 m) above the water. The length of the lake is about 5 miles (8.0 km) while the maximum width is no more than half a mile (0.8 km). The water surface is 2,503 feet (763 m) above sea level and the surface area is 773 acres (313 ha). The total watershed of Coldwater Lake is about 16.6 mi^{2} (43 km^{2}). Coldwater Creek drains 5.4 square miles (14 km^{2}) or 33% of the total, South Fork Coldwater Creek drains 6.3 square miles (16 km^{2}) or 38%, and another 4.9 square miles (13 km^{2}) or 30% drains directly into the lake. Several smaller lakes or glacial tarns are part of the watershed; the named ones are Heart Lake and Snow Lake, which both flow into Coldwater Creek before entering Coldwater Lake. Mount Whittier, the highest point in the basin at 5,883-foot (1,793 m), sits at the head of the Coldwater Creek valley.

== History ==
The eruption of Mount St. Helens on May 18, 1980, created a lahar or debris avalanche that rushed down the North Fork of the Toutle River, burying the whole valley up to 600 feet (180 m) deep. The lahar backed up Coldwater Creek for more than a mile (1.6 km), damming the creek and its tributary South Fork Coldwater Creek to a height of 180 feet (55 m). Over the next few months, almost 100,000 acre-feet (120,000,000 m^{3}) of water collected to form a lake 5 miles (8 km) in length. At the rate the lake was filling, it was anticipated to overtop the landslide dam by late 1981 or 1982. Because the material forming the dam consisted of soft volcanic debris and ash, it would erode quickly if overtopped, causing serious flooding downstream.

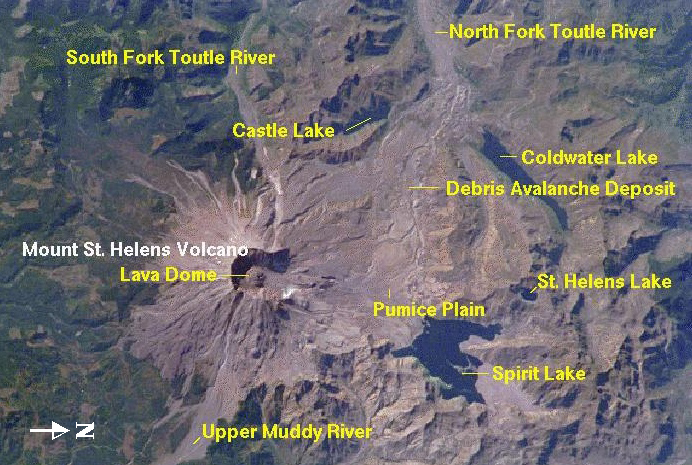
Map showing lakes and other features in the Mount St. Helens area affected by the eruption. West is up.

In early 1981, the U.S. Army Corps of Engineers excavated a spillway and outlet channel for the lake, stabilizing it at 2,503 feet (763 m) above sea level with a volume of 67,300 acre-feet (83,000,000 m^{3}). In May 1985 a tunnel was excavated to connect Spirit Lake to South Coldwater Creek. The eruption had blocked the outlet of Spirit Lake causing it to rise to dangerous levels. The tunnel allowed excess water from Spirit Lake to drain into Coldwater Lake, and from there into the Toutle River. The landslide dam forming Coldwater Lake was closely monitored until 1998, when its stability was no longer deemed a serious concern.

The lake has since been shrinking slowly due to erosion of the approximately 17-square-mile (44 km^{2}) watershed, which was largely stripped of vegetation during the 1980 eruption. However, the area has recovered significantly in the intervening decades with second-growth forest returning. Several deltas have formed around the lake, the largest formed at South Coldwater Creek, whose valley sits closest to the blast zone.

== Recreation ==
The lake is now part of Mount St. Helens National Volcanic Monument, designated in 1982. Washington State Route 504 (the Spirit Lake Highway) provides access from Interstate 5 at Castle Rock. Coldwater Ridge Visitor Center, located on the cliffs west of the lake, provides a panoramic view of the valley; on weekends a Science and Learning Center is open to the public here. The Coldwater Lake Recreation Area, located on the south end of the lake, is available for day use only as the area is located within the restricted zone of the National Monument. The recreation area includes a picnic area, restrooms and boat ramp (non-motorized watercraft only). The 0.6-mile (1 km) Birth of a Lake Trail is a boardwalk trail accessible from the recreation area, and includes interpretive displays discussing the formation of the lake by the eruption. The Lakes Trail runs along the western shore and allows access to the Mount Margaret Backcountry beyond the lake.

The lake has had resident rainbow trout and cutthroat trout since the Washington State Department of Fish and Wildlife (DFW) stocked it in the 1980s. Pre-1980 fish populations in Coldwater Creek and the Toutle River were wiped out by the eruption of Mount St. Helens. The DFW no longer stocks the lake but continues to manage it as a trout fishery. The daily catch limit is one fish, minimum length 18 inches (46 cm).

== See also ==
- Toutle River Sediment Retention Structure
- Volcanic dam
