= Washington State Route 504 =

State highway in southwestern Washington, US

State Route 504
- Spirit Lake Memorial Highway
- Map of the Toutle River Valley in southwestern Washington with SR 504 highlighted in red

Route information
- Auxiliary route of I-5
- Maintained by WSDOT
- Length: 51.76 mi (83.30 km)
- Existed: 1964–present
- Tourist routes: Spirit Lake Memorial Highway

Major junctions
- West end: I-5 / SR 411 in Castle Rock
- SR 505 near Toutle
- Eastern end: Johnston Ridge Observatory in Mount St. Helens NVM

Location
- Country: United States
- State: Washington
- Counties: Cowlitz, Skamania

Highway system
- State highways in Washington; Interstate; US; State; Scenic; Pre-1964; 1964 renumbering; Former
← SR 503	→ SR 505

State Route 504 (SR 504, designated as the Spirit Lake Memorial Highway) is a state highway in southwestern Washington state in the United States. It travels 52 miles (84 km) along the North Fork Toutle River to the Mount St. Helens area, serving as the main access to the Mount St. Helens National Volcanic Monument. The highway begins at an interchange with Interstate 5 (I-5) and SR 411 in Castle Rock and terminates at the Johnston Ridge Observatory near Spirit Lake.

The Cowlitz County government built the Spirit Lake Highway in 1903 and paved it in the early 1930s before it was transferred to state control, becoming Secondary State Highway 1R (SSH 1R) in 1937. SSH 1R initially ended at the boundary of Columbia National Forest (now Gifford Pinchot National Forest), but was extended in 1961 to the timberline of the mountain. It was renumbered to SR 504 in 1964 and remained popular with loggers and tourists, requiring bridges and sections to be rebuilt.

A major section of SR 504 was destroyed in the May 18, 1980, eruption of Mount St. Helens and its subsequent lahar on the North Fork Toutle River. The state government rebuilt most of the highway from 1988 to 1997, relocating it further north and connecting to new interpretive centers at Coldwater Ridge and Johnston Ridge. A part of the old alignment near the Toutle River Sediment Dam is signed as a spur route. Continued volcanic activity at Mount St. Helens, particularly in the mid-2000s, has resulted in closures and evacuations along the highway at various times.

== Route description ==
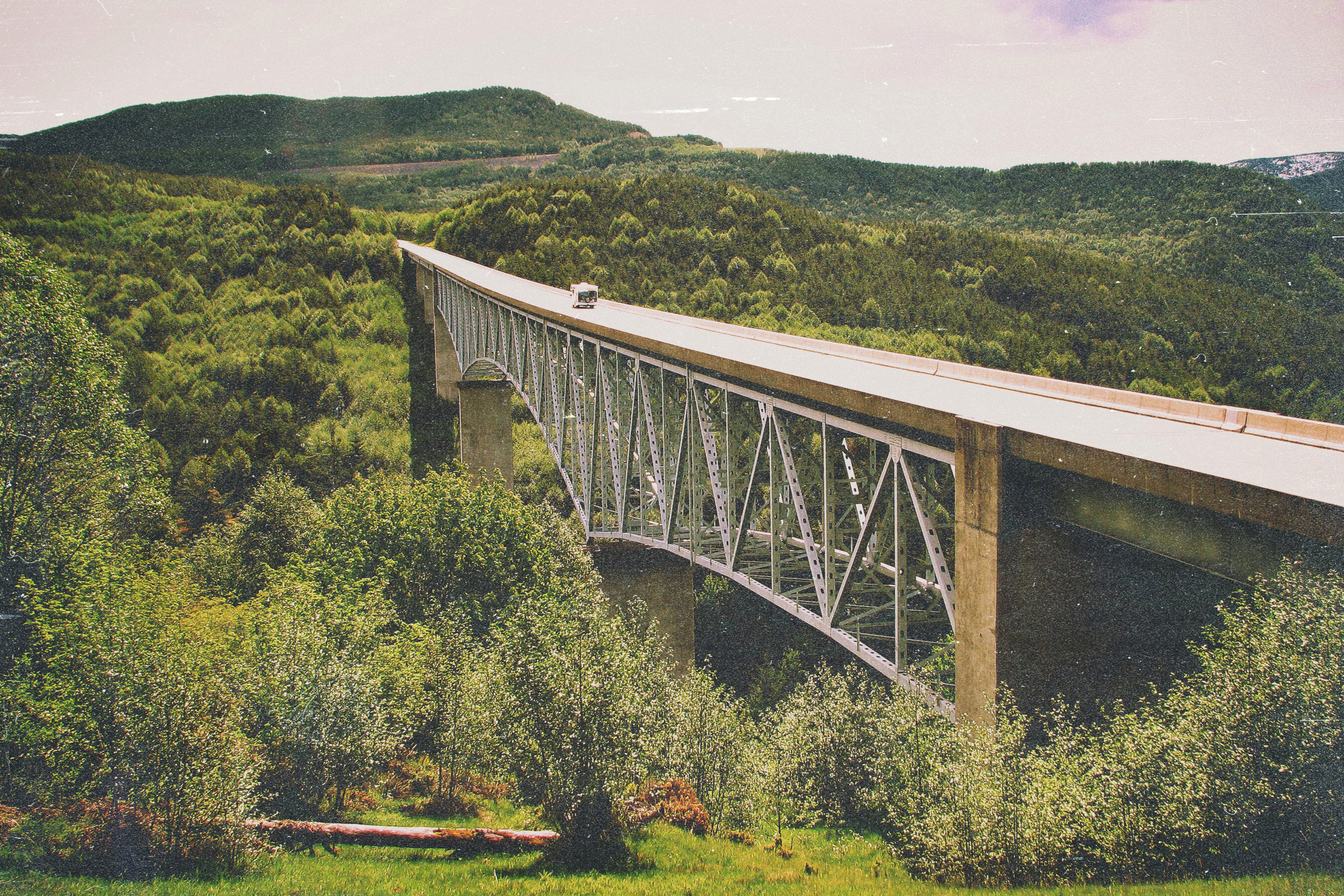
The Hoffstadt Creek Bridge on SR 504, located near the Toutle River Sediment Dam

SR 504 begins as an extension of Huntington Avenue at an interchange with I-5 northeast of Castle Rock. The street continues southwest into downtown Castle Rock as SR 411 and I-5 Business. SR 504 travels northeasterly through a small commercial area before ascending into the hills above Salmon Creek, passing several farms and wineries along the way. The highway follows a minor stream heading southeast into the wetlands around Silver Lake, where the Mount St. Helens visitor center and Seaquest State Park lie. SR 504 continues along the north side of the lake and passes through the town of Toutle at the confluence of the Toutle River's two forks.

The highway crosses over the river on the Coal Bank Bridge and continues along the north side of the North Fork Toutle River, following the narrow valley to the east of Beigle Mountain. Near the Riverdale Raceway, SR 504 intersects the east end of SR 505, which provides connections to I-5 and Toledo. The highway continues northeast into Kid Valley, home to camping sites and a few homes, and follows the south side of the narrower valley as the river meanders north and south around various mountains. At a third crossing of the river, SR 504 intersects a short spur route on Sediment Dam Road that leads to a viewpoint overlooking the Toutle River Sediment Dam. The highway continues along the northeast side of the earthen dam and its reservoir, climbing uphill and running through cuts in the cliffs.

Further southeast along the river, SR 504 passes the privately owned Eco Park resort, a youth camp, and a heliport near the Hoffstadt Bluffs Viewpoint. The highway then crosses over Hoffstadt Creek on a 2,340-foot (710 m) steel truss bridge that sits 370 feet (110 m) above the valley floor; it is the longest of 13 bridges on SR 504. The bridge also marks the western extent of the "blast zone," where trees were felled during the 1980 eruption of Mount St. Helens, located 12 miles (19 km) away. The area has large forests of young fir, pine, and cottonwood trees planted by Weyerhaeuser in the 1980s as part of a regeneration and restoration project. The company also operates the Charles W. Bingham Forest Learning Center, a museum that overlooks the North Fork Toutle River and also includes a rest area.

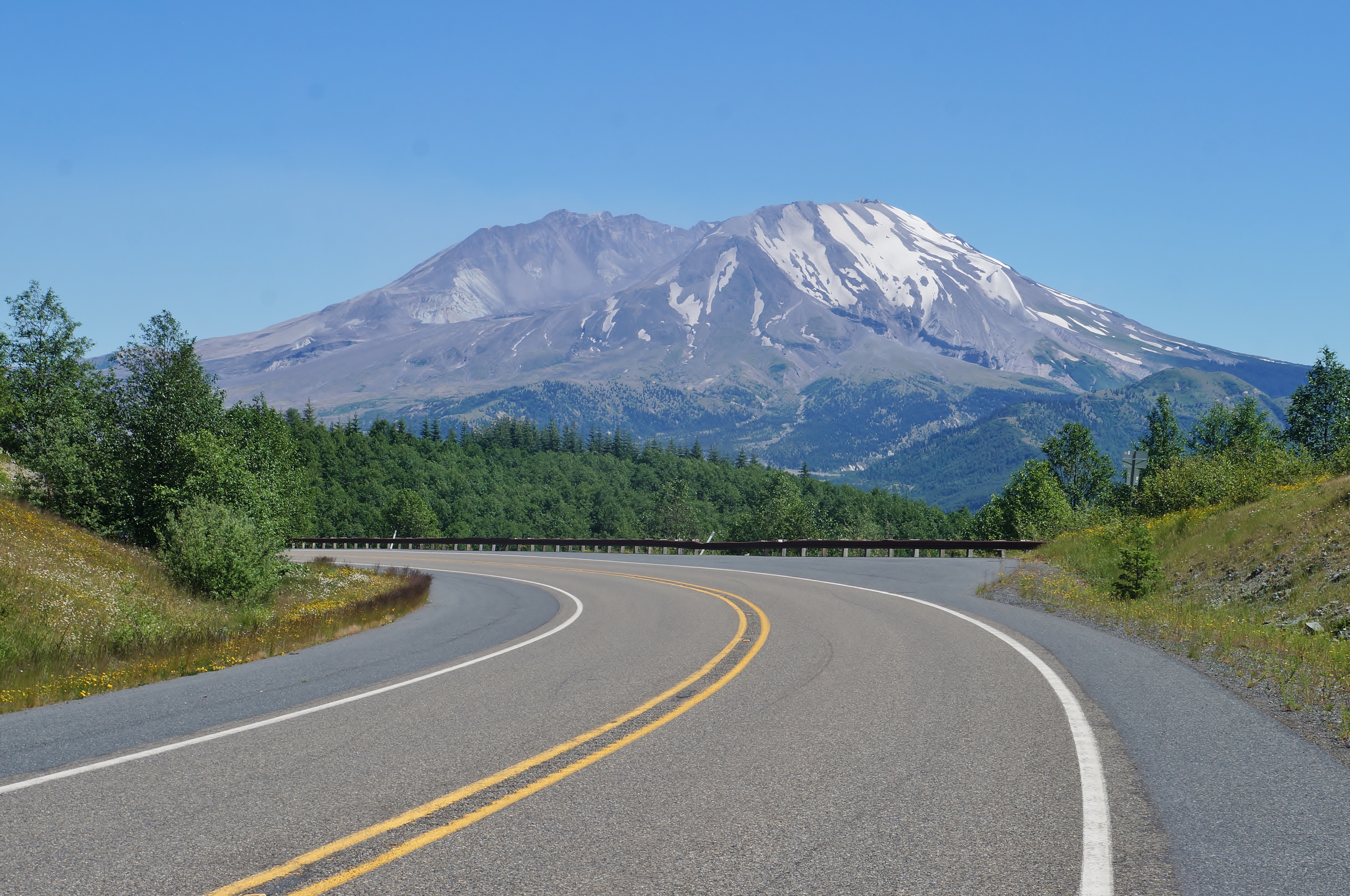
A curve on SR 504 as it approaches Mount St. Helens from the northwest

SR 504 continues further into the mountains, crossing Bear Creek and traveling around Elk Rock to a viewpoint on its southeast side. From the Elk Rock area, the highway forms the northern boundary of the Mount St. Helens National Volcanic Monument and encounters more mountainous terrain that results in several hairpin turns between other scenic viewpoints. After crossing several branches of Maratta Creek, SR 504 reaches a partial cloverleaf interchange with an access road that serves the Coldwater Science and Learning Center, a visitor center that overlooks the mountain and open from autumn to spring. The highway heads west before completing a hairpin turn to travel south around the end of Coldwater Lake. Beyond milepost 45, SR 504 is closed during the winter months due to hazardous conditions for drivers and potential avalanches. It typically reopens in time for the May 18 anniversary of the 1980 eruption.

The highway continues into the National Volcanic Monument and turns east before reaching the border between Cowlitz and Skamania counties. SR 504 follows South Coldwater Creek upstream through a narrow valley to its headwaters near Spirit Lake, passing several trailheads, and turns west to continue its ascent. The treeless landscape is home to winter herds of Rocky Mountain elk and deer. The highway turns east once again near the Loowit Viewpoint and reaches the Johnston Ridge Observatory, the volcano's main visitor center open from spring to autumn and situated at an elevation of 4,314 feet (1,315 m). SR 504 terminates downhill from the observatory at its parking lot, located 5.5 miles (8.9 km) north of the Mount St. Helens crater.

SR 504 is maintained by the Washington State Department of Transportation (WSDOT), which conducts an annual survey on state highways to measure traffic volume in terms of annual average daily traffic. Average traffic volumes on the highway in 2016 ranged from a minimum of 500 vehicles near Coldwater Lake to a maximum of 14,000 vehicles at the I-5 interchange in Castle Rock. SR 504 is the main route for a majority of the 3 million annual visitors to the Mount St. Helens area. It is designated by the state government as the Spirit Lake Memorial Highway, a state scenic byway, and a National Forest Scenic Byway by the United States Forest Service.

== History ==
=== Early history and state acquisition ===
The Spirit Lake Highway was completed in 1903 by the Cowlitz County government, connecting Castle Rock to the shore of Spirit Lake by following the North Fork Toutle River. The 47-mile (76 km) highway was initially unpaved and characterized as rough and narrow, and several sections were improved or bypassed in the 1910s. It was added to the state highway system in 1937 as Secondary State Highway 1R (SSH 1R), terminating at the western boundary of the Columbia National Forest near Spirit Lake. The state government paved sections of the highway in the late 1930s and early 1940s, with only a short section at the east end remaining unpaved by 1944. The remaining section of the highway within Columbia National Forest was improved and paved by the federal Bureau of Public Roads in the late 1930s for $1.2 million (equivalent to $21.3 million in 2024 dollars).

Expanded logging and a planned ski resort on Mount St. Helens hastened the construction of a modern highway linking Spirit Lake to the timberline on the mountain's northern slopes in the 1950s. Despite support from the state government, the Forest Service, and Bureau of Public Roads, the highway project was put on hold for several years due to funding shortfalls. The state legislature approved funds for the five-mile (8.0 km) extension of SSH 1R into the national forest, which began in late 1959. The SSH 1R designation was extended onto the new timberline highway, which opened to traffic on September 29, 1962.

During the 1964 state highway renumbering, SSH 1R was designated SR 504 under the modern "sign route" (now state route) system. The state highway department completed construction of a new bridge over the Toutle River at Kid Valley in November 1965, replacing a narrower truss bridge. By the 1970s, several new campgrounds, trailheads, and recreation areas had been established along the highway by the Forest Service and logging companies like Weyerhauser to serve tourists visiting the Mount St. Helens area. A major flood in December 1977 left eight sections of the highway washed out and only passable by one lane of traffic until repairs were completed the following year.

=== 1980 eruption and rebuilding ===
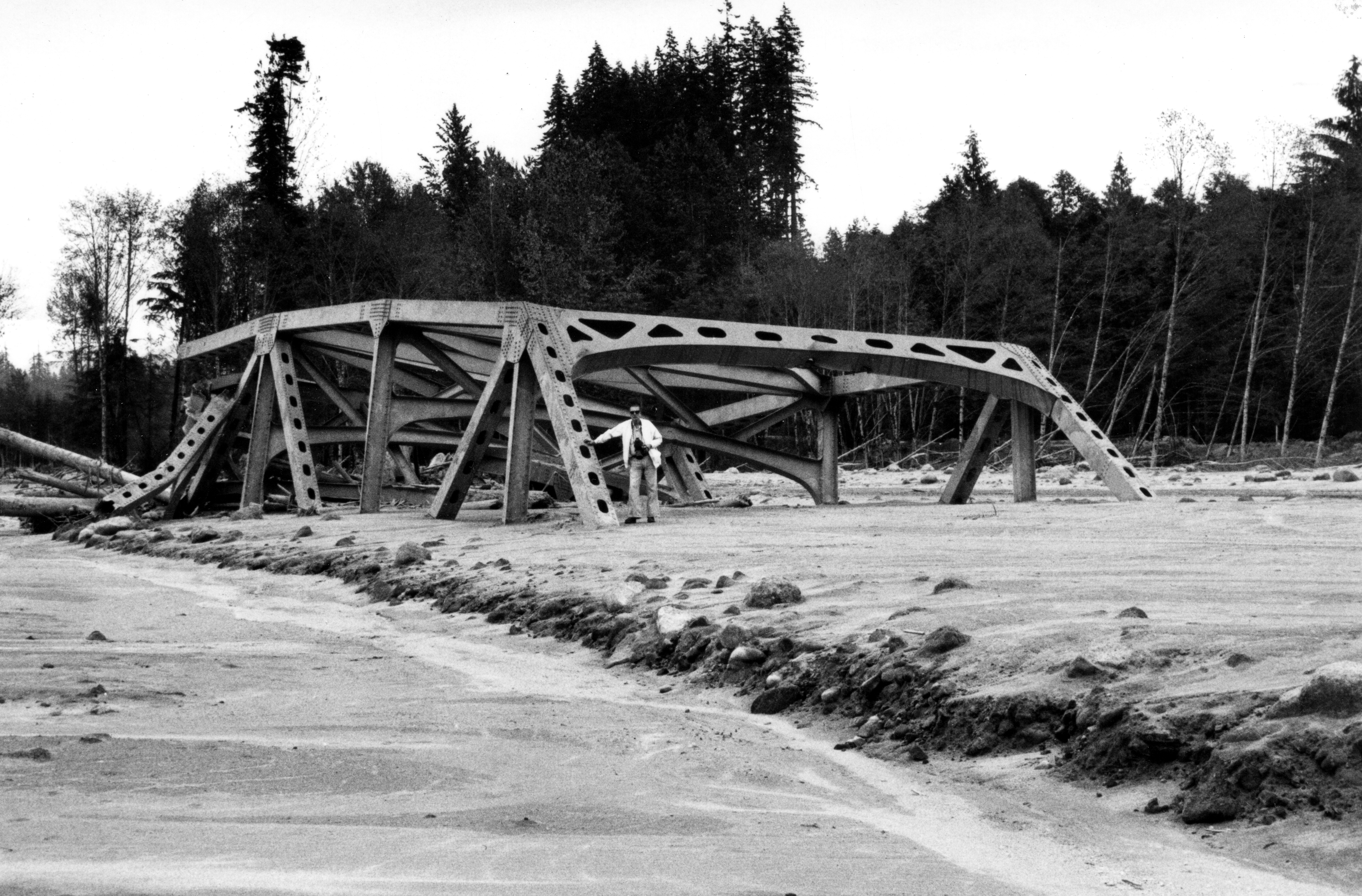
A truss bridge carrying SR 504 over the North Fork Toutle River that was destroyed by the May 1980 eruption's lahar

In March 1980, Mount St. Helens was struck by an earthquake swarm that indicated potential eruptive activity for the volcano, which had been dormant for over a century. The Forest Service established a roadblock on SR 504 approximately 4 miles (6.4 km) west of Spirit Lake on March 28 because of potential avalanche risks. In the following days, the roadblock was moved to 15 miles (24 km) west of the lake and later 30 miles (48 km) west as the risk of an imminent eruption grew. Many local residents and sightseers violated the roadblock, which was planned to be moved further west by an order from Governor Dixy Lee Ray to take effect on May 19. An exception was made on May 17, allowing for the retrieval of belongings from various buildings during a four-hour period that was monitored by local authorities in case of a mass evacuation.

On May 18, 1980, the north face of Mount St. Helens slid away and triggered a massive eruption that created a lahar that devastated the North Fork Toutle River. The lahar destroyed about 25 miles (40 km) of SR 504, including seven of the highway's eight major bridges, leaving only the Kid Valley bridge standing because of its sufficient clearance. The remaining section between Toutle and Kid Valley was buried in up to 6 feet (1.8 m) of sediment, but was able to re-open by September with temporary Bailey bridges and other structures. Several vehicles on the highway were swept away by the lahar, including those carrying some of the eruption's 57 victims.

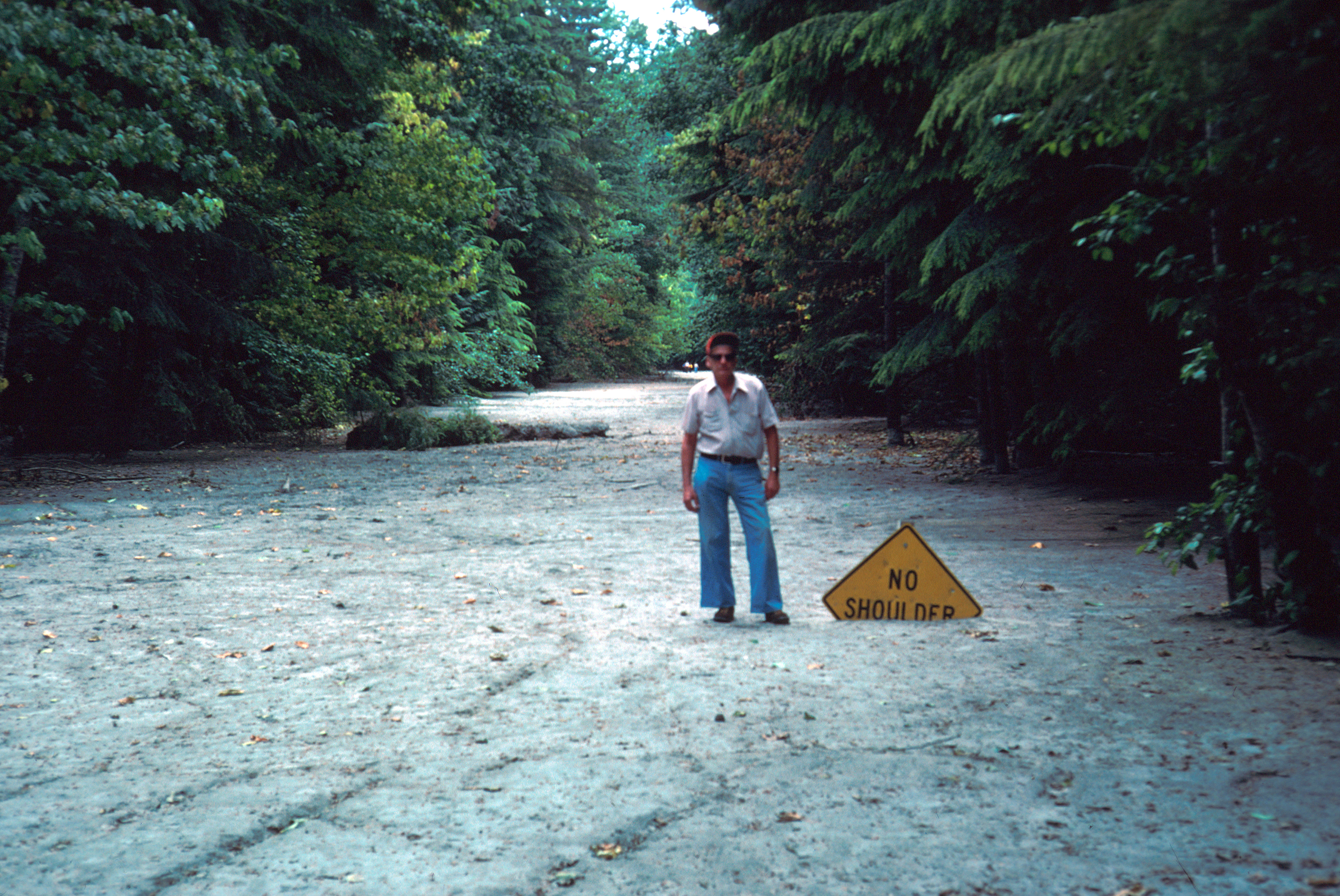
A section of SR 504 near Coal Bank buried under a lahar deposit

The highway was closed beyond the town of Toutle, controlled by a roadblock and an existing turnaround loop installed by Weyerhaeuser. Access to Kid Valley was restored by early September using a temporary Bailey bridge over the Toutle River. The highway was extended to the debris and sediment dam and Weyerhaeuser's Camp Baker site in 1987 at a cost of $11 million (equivalent to $26 million in 2024 dollars). In 1982, the federal government designated the area around the volcano as the Mount St. Helens National Volcanic Monument and the state government designated SR 504 as the Spirit Lake Memorial Highway to honor the victims of the eruption. A visitor center was also opened at Silver Lake in 1987 to serve the growing number of tourists to the area, but the highway would remain closed beyond the sediment dam.

Preliminary plans for a replacement for the highway to serve the north side of Mount St. Helens were approved by the state government in 1986. The highway would include 23 miles (37 km) of new road built at a higher elevation between Kid Valley and the newly formed Coldwater Lake, crossing over various creeks with ten major bridges. The project's $118 million cost (equivalent to $286 million in 2024 dollars) was paid from emergency funds from the Federal Highway Administration. Construction of the new highway and its scenic viewpoints began in 1988 and the first section to the Coldwater Ridge visitor center was completed on October 16, 1992. The expected influx of tourists and their potential impact on the recovering habitat around the volcano alarmed scientists looking to preserve areas for sensitive research. After finding that elk herds were leaving areas with improved highway access, the Forest Service established restricted zones within the national monument that prohibited off-trail hiking, pets, fires, and camping.

Two additional visitor centers, Weyerhaeuser's Forest Learning Center and the former Hoffstadt Bluffs Visitor Center, opened in 1995 at milepost 33 and 1996 at milepost 27, respectively. In May 1997, SR 504 was extended 7.5 miles (12.1 km) to its current terminus at the newly opened Johnston Ridge Observatory, named for volcanologist David A. Johnston. Construction of the extension included underground blasting to compact soil and provide one of the highway's bridges with a stable foundation. It replaced an original plan to build a forest road that would be used by shuttle buses between Coldwater Ridge and the Johnston Ridge facility.

=== 21st century ===
A long-proposed extension of SR 504 to the eastern side of the Mount St. Helens area gained traction in the early 2000s, sparking outcry from scientists and environmentalists. The 7-to-17-mile (11 to 27 km) route, connecting Coldwater Lake to the existing Forest Highway 99 near Windy Ridge and beyond to Forest Highway 25, was supported by officials from Cowlitz and Lewis counties as a tourist draw and a potential evacuation route. WSDOT studied several options for the proposed highway, which enjoyed mixed public support, and estimated a cost of $18.5 million to construct one option and $44 million for another (equivalent to $31.2 million and $74.2 million, respectively, in 2024 dollars). The proposed highway was rejected by state legislators due to its cost, despite attempts at salvaging the cheaper proposal by converting it into a toll road.

From 2004 until 2006, increased volcanic activity at Mount St. Helens caused a surge in tourist traffic on SR 504, along with periodic shutdowns of the Johnston Ridge section. An evacuation of the area was ordered in early October 2004 due to seismic activity, indicating a possible buildup of magma, forcing 2,500 visitors to leave the Coldwater and Johnston centers for several days. The evacuation was later cancelled and other restrictions were relaxed after steam eruptions diffused pressure inside the volcano. A minor mudslide in March 2007 blocked a section of SR 504 near Kid Valley and was removed after a week-long cleanup by WSDOT crews.

A mudslide and debris flow, known as the 2023 South Coldwater Slide, occurred on May 14, 2023, destroying the 85-foot (26 m) Spirit Lake Outlet Bridge and severing SR 504 northeast of Johnston Ridge Observatory at milepost 49. Twelve people were airlifted from the area beyond the mudslide; the observatory's seasonal reopening was postponed and the highway east of Coldwater Lake was closed to all traffic. WSDOT contractors cleared debris over the highway by July and created a temporary gravel road to access Johnston Ridge for vehicle retrieval and to prepare for reopening in 2024, but the interim roadway was washed out in November due to a collapsed culvert caused by heavy rainfall and erosion unrelated to the earlier landslide. WSDOT announced in early 2024 that because of the costs and difficulties in making repairs to the bypass, based on a limited construction window due to weather and elevation as well as the steepness of the terrain, the highway and access to the observatory was to remain closed until 2026. In April 2026, WSDOT announced the beginning of the reconstruction of the Spirit Lake Outlet Bridge to commence that month, with a possible reopening of the highway later that year.

== Major intersections ==
County	Location	mi	km	Destinations	Notes
Cowlitz	Castle Rock	0.00	0.00	I-5 / SR 411 south / I-5 BL south (Huntington Avenue) – Portland, Seattle, Castle Rock	Western terminus
Cowlitz		14.69	23.64	SR 505 west to I-5 – Toledo	
Cowlitz		21.03	33.84	SR 504 Spur (Sediment Dam Road)	Former alignment of SR 504
Cowlitz	Mount St. Helens NVM	44.32	71.33	Mount St. Helens National Volcanic Monument boundary	
Skamania	Mount St. Helens NVM	51.76	83.30	Johnston Ridge Observatory	Eastern terminus
1.000 mi = 1.609 km; 1.000 km = 0.621 mi

== Spur route ==
State Route 504 Spur
- Location: Cowlitz County
- Length: 0.87 mi (1,400 m)
- Existed: 1991–present

SR 504 has a short spur route east of Kid Valley that runs along Sediment Dam Road. It follows a 0.87-mile (1.40 km) section of the former highway and terminates near the Toutle River Sediment Dam at a viewpoint and WSDOT maintenance facility An average of 50 vehicles use the road on a daily basis, according to annual daily traffic data measured by WSDOT in 2016.
