= Green River (North Fork Toutle River tributary) =

River in Washington state

Location
- Country: United States
- State: Washington
- Counties: Lewis, Skamania, Cowlitz

Physical characteristics
- Source: Near Spirit Lake
  - location: Gifford Pinchot National Forest, Lewis County
  - coordinates: 46°18′02″N 122°05′33″W
  - elevation: 4,765 ft (1,452 m)
- Mouth: North Fork Toutle River
  - location: Toutle, Cowlitz County
  - coordinates: 46°22′22″N 122°34′57″W
  - elevation: 741 ft (226 m)
- Length: 37.4 mi (60.2 km)
- Basin size: 131 mi^{2} (340 km^{2})
- Discharge
  - location: near Kid Valley
  - average: 479 cu ft/s (13.6 m^{3}/s)
  - minimum: 34.2 cu ft/s (0.97 m^{3}/s)
  - maximum: 14,500 cu ft/s (410 m^{3}/s)

Basin features
- Geographic Names Information System: 1520325

The Green River is the largest tributary of the North Fork Toutle River in the U.S. state of Washington. Situated near Mount St. Helens in the Cascade Range in the southern part of the state, it flows generally west through Mount St. Helens National Volcanic Monument and industrial timberlands for 37.4 miles (60.2 km). The river drains more than 130 square miles (340 km^{2}) in parts of three Washington counties: Skamania, Lewis, and Cowlitz.

As with most other parts of the Toutle River and Cowlitz River systems, the upper part of the Green River was heavily affected by the 1980 eruption of Mount St. Helens.

== Course ==
It rises from snowmelt on the opposite side of a ridge from Spirit Lake, in the Gifford Pinchot National Forest in Skamania County. The river initially flows north, but turns northwest after the confluence with Grizzly Creek. Turning west, it crosses into Lewis County, then back south into Skamania, and almost immediately afterwards flows into Cowlitz County. Shultz Creek enters from the left then Devils Creek from the right. The river empties into the North Fork Toutle River near the unincorporated community of Toutle.

== See also ==
- List of geographic features in Lewis County, Washington
