= Kid Valley, Washington =

Unincorporated community in Washington, United States

- Unincorporated community
- Location in the state of Washington Kid Valley (the United States)
- Coordinates: 46°22′22″N 122°37′09″W
- Country: United States
- State: Washington
- County: Cowlitz
- Elevation: 778 ft (237 m)
- Time zone: UTC−8 (PST)
  - Summer (DST): UTC−7 (PDT)
- ZIP Code: 98649
- Area code(s): 360, 564
- FIPS code: 53-35730
- GNIS feature ID: 1521651

Kid Valley is an unincorporated community in Cowlitz County, Washington. Kid Valley is located east of the city of Castle Rock and along the North Fork Toutle River. Kid Valley is reached by traveling 17.8 miles (28.6 km) east of Castle Rock along Washington State Route 504, which is also known as the Spirit Lake Memorial Highway. The Kid Valley community is part of the Toutle Lake School District, a K-12 school district of about 600 students.

Kid Valley is located 23.86 miles (38.40 km) northwest of Mount St. Helens. The eruption of Mount St. Helens on May 18, 1980, was the deadliest and most economically destructive volcanic event in the history of the United States.

== Geography ==
The Kid Valley Bridge carries State Highway 504 from the north to the south side of the North Fork of the Toutle River. This bridge was the only bridge on the highway not damaged or completely destroyed by mudflows following the 1980 eruption of Mount St. Helens. Its survival was due to its high clearance.

There was a logging camp, 19 mile, in Kid Valley. Some of the bridges destroyed by Mount St. Helens were owned by logging companies. Another natural disaster that affected logging in Kid Valley was a storm in February 1996 which caused multiple debris flows. It was mostly logging roads that were damaged, but State Highway 504 was also blocked in two places near Kid Valley.

There is a forest campsite in Kid Valley.
