= Castle Rock High School =

Location
- 5180 West Side Highway; Castle Rock, Washington 98611; United States; 46.28219°N 122.920039°W

Information
- Type: Public
- School district: Castle Rock School District
- Principal: Brook French
- Teaching staff: 28.10 (FTE)
- Grades: 9-12
- Enrollment: 438 (2023–2024)
- Student to teacher ratio: 15.59
- Colors: Red and White
- Athletics conference: Trico 1A
- Nickname: The Rockets
- Rivals: La Center High School
- Accreditation: NAAS
- Website: www.crschools.org

Castle Rock High School is a rural public high school in Castle Rock, Washington.

== Academics ==
14% of Castle Rock students take an Advanced Placement (AP) exam, with 2% passing the AP exam. 18% of Castle Rock students are proficient in math and 55% are proficient in reading. Castle Rock is well below the state median both graduation rates and proficiency scores.

Castle Rock has a graduation rate of 80%.

== Demographics ==
1. White (79.0%)
2. Hispanic (12.0%)
3. Two or More Races (6.00%)
4. American Indian/Alaskan Native (2.00%)
5. Asian (1.00%)
6. Other (1.00%)

Castle Rock is a predominantly white high school, with 79% of its students considering themselves white. The two other most popular racial/ethnic groups are Hispanic and Two or more races.

47% of students are female, and 53% are male. 47% are economically disadvantaged, with 48% forming part of the free or reduced lunch programs.

== Sports ==
Castle Rock is a member of the Washington Interscholastic Activities Association (WIAA) and competes in the Southwest Washington District 4 Trico 1A league. The Trico 1A consists of eight teams.

=== State championships ===
- Baseball: 1988
- Boys Basketball: 1932, 1969
- Boys Track: 1983, 1985, 1990, 1991
- Boys Wrestling: 1984, 1985
- Football: 1988
- Softball: 2007, 2010
- Volleyball: 1987, 1993, 2013

=== State runners-up ===
- Baseball: 1987
- Boys Track: 1974, 1975, 1984
- Boys Wrestling: 1981, 1982
- Girls Basketball: 1982, 2013
- Softball: 2008, 2009
- Volleyball: 1983, 2008, 2011

== Notable people ==
- Benji Radach - mixed martial arts fighter
