= Olequa, Washington =

Unincorporated community in Washington, United States

- Unincorporated community
- Location in the state of Washington Olequa (the United States)
- Coordinates: 46°22′31″N 122°56′25″W
- Country: United States
- State: Washington
- County: Cowlitz
- Elevation: 98 ft (30 m)
- Time zone: UTC−8 (PST)
  - Summer (DST): UTC−7 (PDT)
- ZIP Code: 98611
- Area code(s): 360, 564
- FIPS code: 53-51130
- GNIS feature ID: 1511203

Olequa, also known as Olequah, is an unincorporated community in Cowlitz County, Washington. Olequa is located north of the city of Castle Rock on the west bank of the Cowlitz River. Olequa is accessed by traveling 7.5 miles (12.1 km) north on West Side Highway from Castle Rock. The Olequa community is part of the Castle Rock School District, a K-12 school district of about 1,300 students.

== Etymology ==
Named after Olequa Creek, circa 1872, by General J.W. Sprague, two competing theories of the Cowlitz Indian word, Olequa, exist. One hypothesis is considered to come from a vague association of the term "cametze", translated to mean "where the salmon come to spawn". A second theory suggests the name came from the sound associated with a nickname of an elder, well-known Cowlitz tribal member, "Old Laquash".

== History ==
The community originally was situated on a main line of the Northern Pacific Railroad. A post office called Olequa was established in 1875, and remained in operation until 1912.
