= Toutle River Sediment Retention Structure =

Sediment Retention Structure
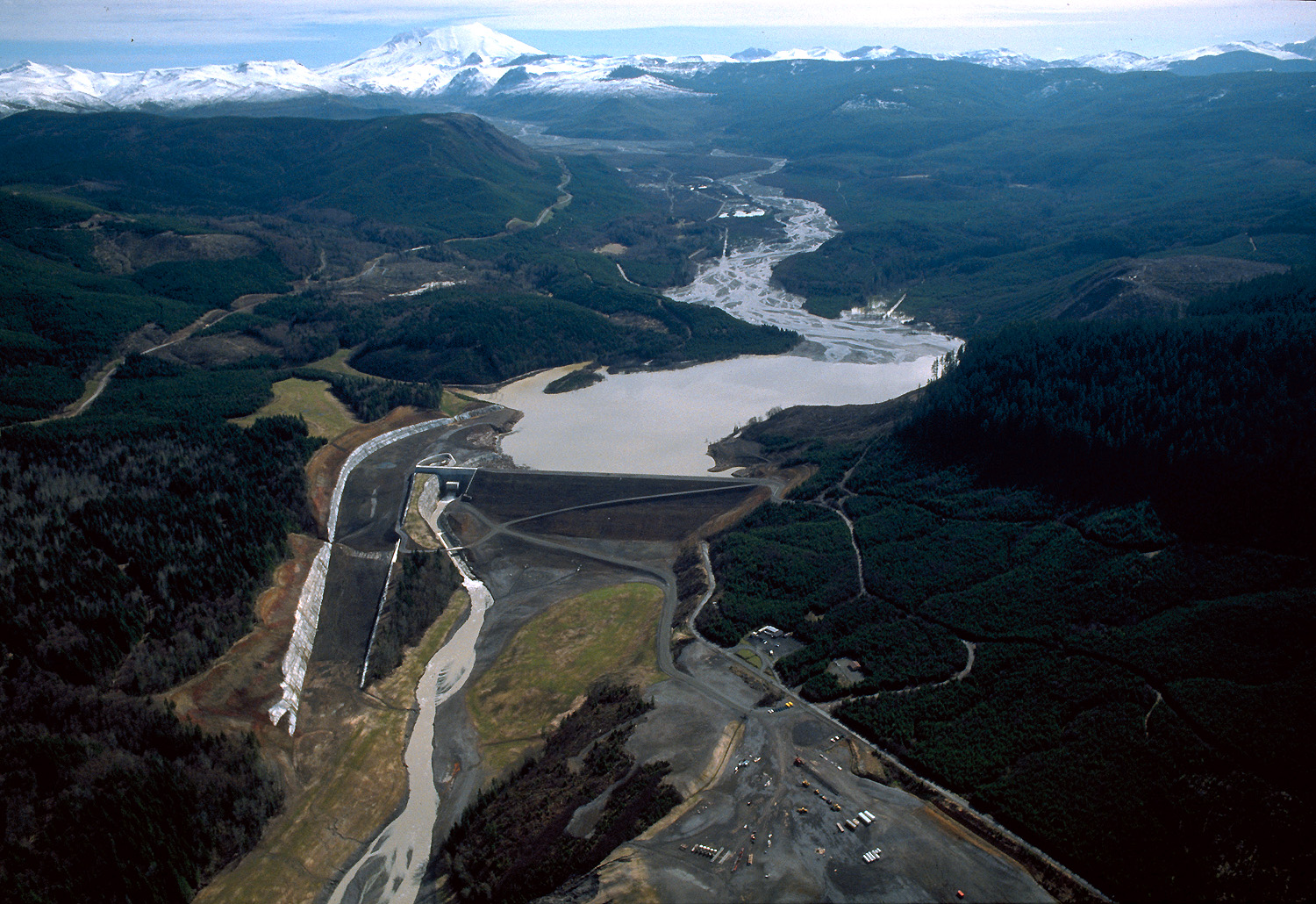
- Aerial photograph looking upriver with Mount St. Helens in the background
- Interactive map of Sediment Retention Structure
- Official name: Sediment Retention Structure
- Location: Cowlitz County, Washington, U.S.
- Coordinates: 46°21′41″N 122°33′06″W
- Construction began: December 1986
- Opening date: December 1989
- Construction cost: $65 million
- Operator: US Army Corps of Engineers

Dam and spillways
- Impounds: North Fork Toutle River
- Height: 184 ft (56 m)
- Length: 1,888 ft (575 m)

Reservoir
- Total capacity: 160,000 acre⋅ft (200,000,000 m^{3}) (now silted)
- Surface area: 3,200 acres (13 km^{2})

The Sediment Retention Structure is an earthen dam, 1,887 feet (575 m) long and 184 feet (56 m) high, on the North Fork Toutle River in the U.S. state of Washington. Completed by the United States Army Corps of Engineers in 1989, it is meant to prevent sediment from the 1980 eruption of Mount St. Helens from increasing flood risks along the Toutle and Cowlitz rivers.

The Corps initially expected the basin behind the dam to be filled by 2035 with 258 million cubic yards (197 million m^{3}) of sediment. However, additional debris flows from Mount St. Helens plus sediment from storm-related riverbank failures quickly filled the basin. It was nearly full by 2012, and large amounts of sediment overflowed the SRS and continued downstream.

In July 2012, the Corps awarded a $4.5 million contract to LKE Corporation of Washougal, to raise the spillway by 7 feet (2.1 m). In 2013, the contractor raised the dam's spillway by 7 feet (2.1 m) to increase the ability of the SRS to trap sediment. The higher spillway reduces the slope of the sediment plain behind the dam, thus allowing more debris to accumulate on top of existing debris. The Corps estimated that the higher spillway would maintain the trapping efficiency of the SRS at or above 31 percent—the fraction being trapped without the higher spillway—for 5 to 10 years after completion of the project.

The SRS is about 13 miles (21 km) upstream from the confluence of the North Fork Toutle River with the Toutle River and 30.5 miles (49.1 km) from the larger river's mouth on the Cowlitz River. The structure is about 45 miles (72 km) north-northeast of Portland, Oregon. Large communities downstream of the SRS include Castle Rock, Kelso, and Longview.

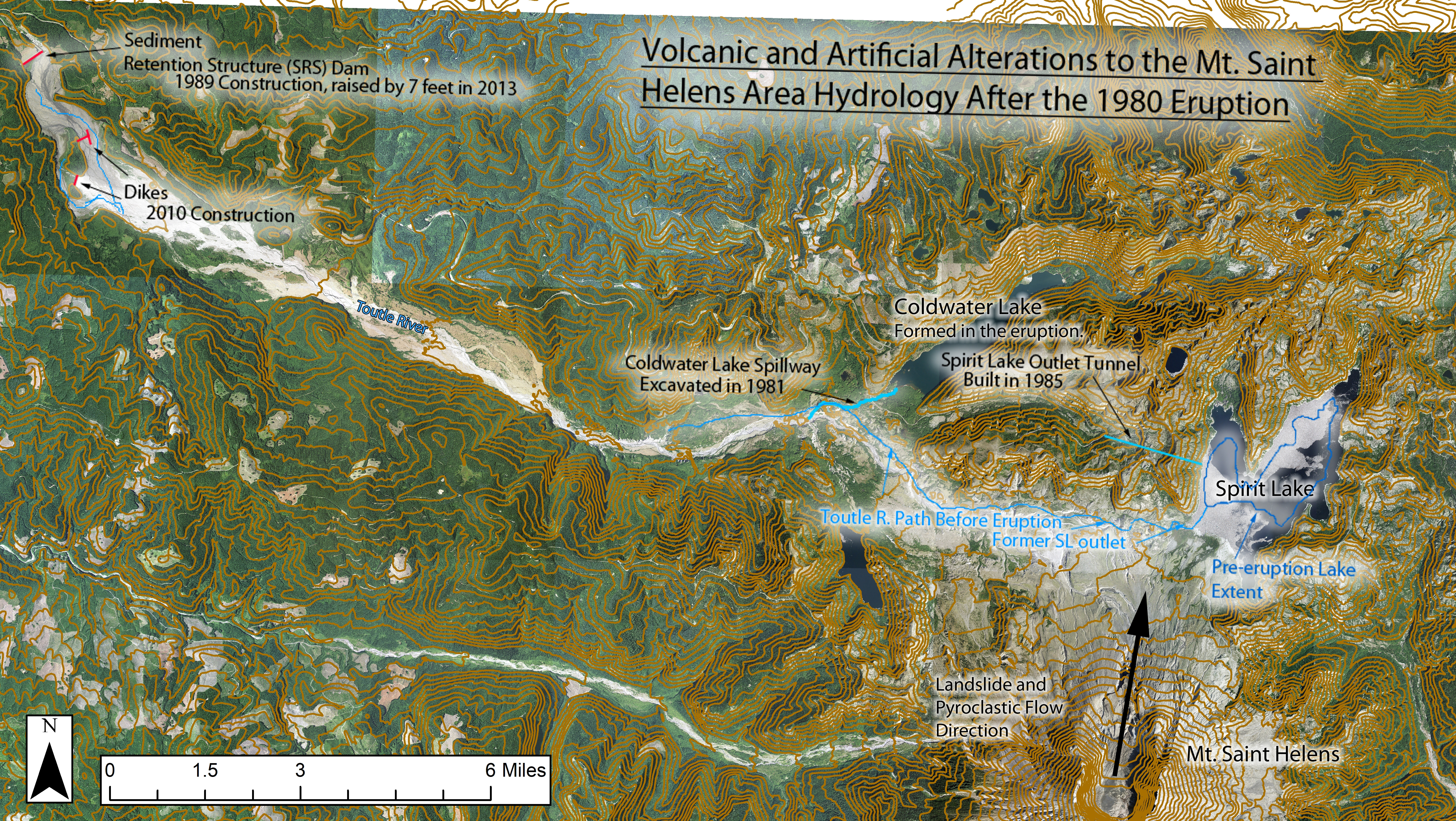
Major changes in hydrology of Mt. Saint Helens after its 1980 eruption, including artificial modifications designed to mitigate sediment and water flow
