= Castle Rock, Washington =

- City
- Nickname: The Rock
- Location of Castle Rock, Washington
- Coordinates: 46°15′46″N 122°53′48″W
- Country: United States
- State: Washington
- County: Cowlitz
- Incorporated: June 20, 1890

Government
  - Mayor: Paul Helenberg

Area
  - City: 2.32 sq mi (6.01 km^{2})
  - Land: 2.09 sq mi (5.42 km^{2})
  - Water: 0.23 sq mi (0.59 km^{2})
- Elevation: 46 ft (14 m)

Population (2020)
  - City: 2,446
  - Density: 1,097/sq mi (423.6/km^{2})
  - Urban: 2,154
- Time zone: UTC−8 (Pacific (PST))
  - Summer (DST): UTC−7 (PDT)
- ZIP Code: 98611
- Area code: 360, 564
- FIPS code: 53-10565
- GNIS feature ID: 2409409
- Website: ci.castle-rock.wa.us

Castle Rock is a city in Cowlitz County, Washington, United States. Located between the Willapa Hills and the western base of Mount St. Helens, Castle Rock is at the heart of Washington timber country in the Pacific temperate rain forest. Castle Rock is part of the Longview, Washington Metropolitan Statistical Area; the population was 2,446 as of the 2020 census.

== History ==
Castle Rock is named for a volcanic rock outcropping over the Cowlitz River, "The Rock", rising 190 feet high on the south side of the city. The rock formation, resembling a castle, became a geographic landmark for Cowlitz Indians and Hudson's Bay Company traders as early as 1832. Today, it is the location of The Rock Community Park, with hiking trails, picnic tables, and a historical marker.

Castle Rock is centered primarily on the donation land claim of Eliza and William Huntington, who settled at the location in 1852. The city was platted December 12, 1888 and incorporated on June 20, 1890. Castle Rock prospered as a Cowlitz River steamboat port and trading center for valley farms. The local sawmill was the first to produce cedar shingles, using the Western red cedar, which grows in abundance in the region.

By 1940, the population had reached 1,182 and was supported by dairy farming, truck farming, and lumber manufacturing. Sword ferns, common in the region, were picked each year by several hundred people to be processed into medicine. In the spring, large quantities of Cascara Sagrada bark were gathered, dried, and shipped.

== Geography ==
Castle Rock is located 117 miles south of Seattle and 58 miles north of Portland, Oregon. Castle Rock is situated between the Cowlitz River and Interstate 5, one mile south of the confluence of the Cowlitz and the Toutle River. According to the United States Census Bureau, the city has a total area of 1.76 square miles (4.56 km^{2}), of which, 1.59 square miles (4.12 km^{2}) is land and 0.17 square miles (0.44 km^{2}) is water. It is the northernmost city in Cowlitz County.

== Transportation ==
Spirit Lake Memorial Highway (State Route 504) connects the city to the Mount St. Helens National Volcanic Monument, the Spirit Lake recreation area, Seaquest State Park and Silver Lake. The State Route 504 Spur extends to Gifford Pinchot National Forest.

West Side Highway, running north along the Cowlitz River, connects Castle Rock to Cloud Mountain and the communities of Olequa and Vader, Washington. Continuing south, West Side Highway / State Route 411 connects Castle Rock to Longview, Washington, and Ocean Beach Highway (State Route 4), putting Castle Rock 75 miles from Willapa National Wildlife Refuge and the Pacific Ocean.

The Castle Rock Park & Ride is located on Huntington Avenue next to Interstate 5 Exit 49. Bus service is provided by Lower Columbia CAP Rural Public Transit to Longview and Castle Rock, via Interstate 5.

The Riverfront Trail, a multi-use off-road trail, runs along both sides of the Cowlitz River. On the east side, the trail begins at Lions Pride Park, runs past the Rock Community Park, and 1.5 miles later reaches the PH10 bridge. On the west side, the trail runs 1100 feet to the Castle Rock Sports Complex. The City of Castle Rock was awarded the Association of Washington Cities 2004 Municipal Achievement Gold Medal Award for the city's trail system.

== Demographics ==
Historical population
Census	Pop.	Note	%±
1890	681		—
1900	750		10.1%
1910	998		33.1%
1920	829		−16.9%
1930	1,239		49.5%
1940	1,182		−4.6%
1950	1,255		6.2%
1960	1,424		13.5%
1970	1,647		15.7%
1980	2,162		31.3%
1990	2,067		−4.4%
2000	2,130		3.0%
2010	1,982		−6.9%
2020	2,446		23.4%
U.S. Decennial Census; 2020 Census

=== 2020 census ===
As of the 2020 census, Castle Rock had a population of 2,446. The median age was 37.7 years, 23.8% of residents were under the age of 18, and 16.6% were 65 years of age or older. For every 100 females, there were 92.8 males, and for every 100 females age 18 and over there were 91.1 males age 18 and over.

95.0% of residents lived in urban areas, while 5.0% lived in rural areas.

There were 933 households in Castle Rock, of which 36.9% had children under the age of 18 living in them. Of all households, 40.6% were married-couple households, 20.8% were households with a male householder and no spouse or partner present, and 28.4% were households with a female householder and no spouse or partner present. About 25.4% of all households were made up of individuals and 11.6% had someone living alone who was 65 years of age or older.

There were 988 housing units, of which 5.6% were vacant. The homeowner vacancy rate was 1.0% and the rental vacancy rate was 4.0%.

Racial composition as of the 2020 census
Race	Number	Percent
White	2,111	86.3%
Black or African American	14	0.6%
American Indian and Alaska Native	62	2.5%
Asian	13	0.5%
Native Hawaiian and Other Pacific Islander	8	0.3%
Some other race	42	1.7%
Two or more races	196	8.0%
Hispanic or Latino (of any race)	153	6.3%

=== 2010 census ===
As of the 2010 census, there were 1,982 people, 784 households, and 519 families living in the city. The population density was 1,246.5 inhabitants per square mile (481.3/km^{2}). There were 863 housing units at an average density of 542.8 per square mile (209.6/km^{2}). The racial makeup of the city was 91.4% White, 0.1% African American, 2.2% Native American, 0.2% Asian, 0.4% Pacific Islander, 1.7% from other races, and 4.0% from two or more races. Hispanic or Latino of any race were 4.9% of the population.

There were 784 households, of which 32.7% had children under the age of 18 living with them, 43.5% were married couples living together, 16.3% had a female householder with no husband present, 6.4% had a male householder with no wife present, and 33.8% were non-families. 27.7% of all households were made up of individuals, and 10.9% had someone living alone who was 65 years of age or older. The average household size was 2.53 and the average family size was 3.06.

The median age in the city was 39.3 years. 24.4% of residents were under the age of 18; 8.1% were between the ages of 18 and 24; 24.7% were from 25 to 44; 27% were from 45 to 64; and 15.9% were 65 years of age or older. The gender makeup of the city was 47.5% male and 52.5% female.

=== 2000 census ===
As of the 2000 census, there were 2,130 people, 833 households, and 562 families living in the city. The population density was 1,597.3 people per square mile (618.3/km^{2}). There were 890 housing units at an average density of 667.4 per square mile (258.4/km^{2}). The racial makeup of the city was 93.19% White, 0.23% African American, 2.02% Native American, 0.28% Asian, 0.38% Pacific Islander, 1.64% from other races, and 2.25% from two or more races. Hispanic or Latino of any race were 3.33% of the population. 18.7% were of American, 18.3% German, 12.9% English, 6.9% Irish and 6.1% Norwegian ancestry. 96.5% spoke English, and 3.0% Spanish as their first language.

There were 833 households, out of which 33.9% had children under the age of 18 living with them, 46.3% were married couples living together, 16.6% had a female householder with no husband present, and 32.5% were non-families. 28.2% of all households were made up of individuals, and 13.4% had someone living alone who was 65 years of age or older. The average household size was 2.53 and the average family size was 3.07.

In the city, the age distribution of the population shows 29.4% under the age of 18, 7.5% from 18 to 24, 26.9% from 25 to 44, 22.7% from 45 to 64, and 13.6% who were 65 years of age or older. The median age was 36 years. For every 100 females, there were 86.0 males. For every 100 females age 18 and over, there were 83.5 males.

The median income for a household in the city was $37,212, and the median income for a family was $44,125. Males had a median income of $38,289 versus $25,000 for females. The per capita income for the city was $15,661. About 10.7% of families and 17.3% of the population were below the poverty line, including 20.9% of those under age 18 and 7.5% of those age 65 or over.

== Education ==
There are four schools in Castle Rock: Castle Rock Elementary, Castle Rock Intermediate School, Castle Rock Middle School, and Castle Rock High School. The middle school's mascot was the Pirate but was recently changed to the Rocket to match the elementary school and high school.
