= Cowlitz River =

River in Cowlitz and Lewis counties, Washington state

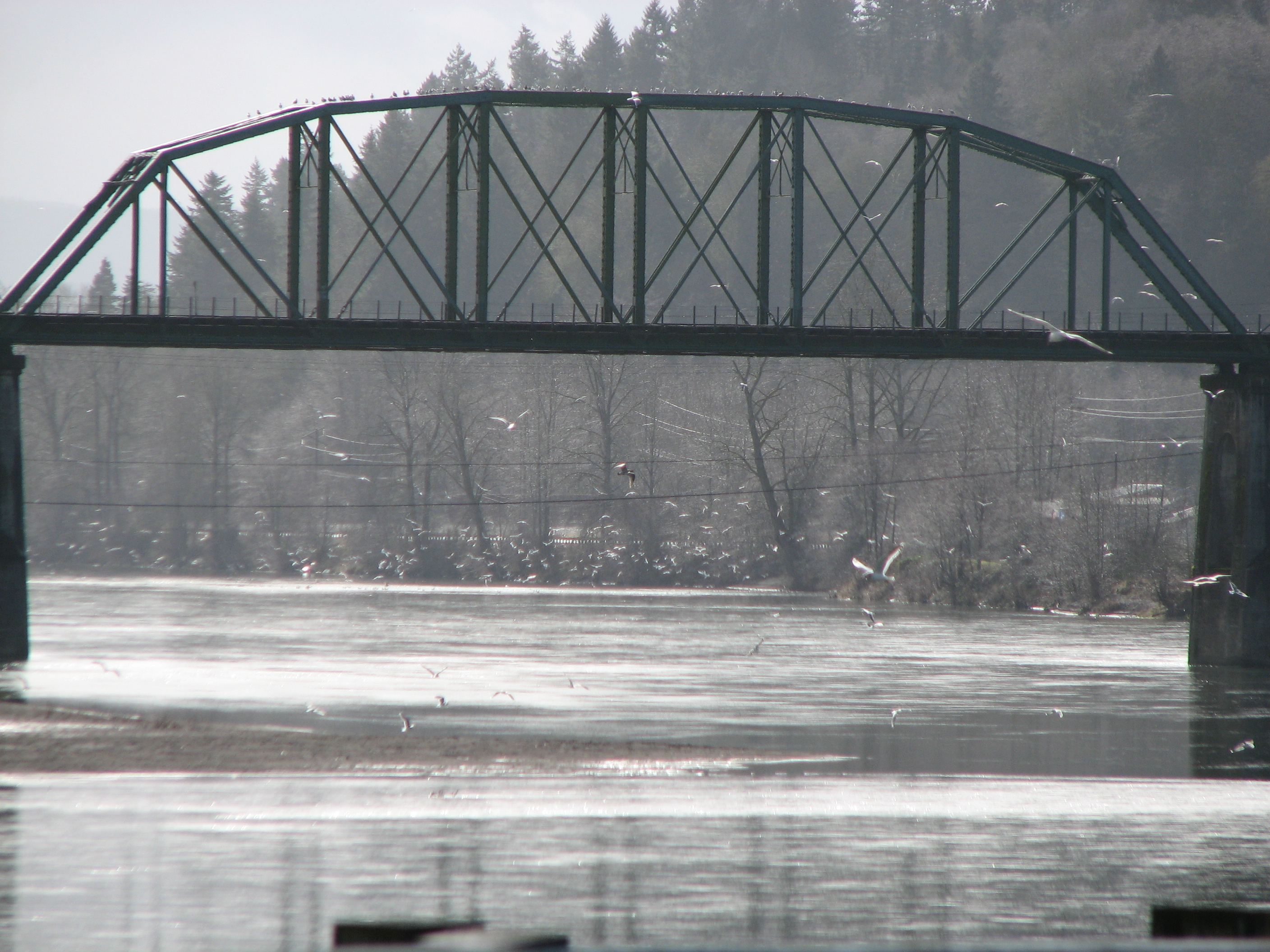
- Cowlitz River at Kelso, Washington, 2012

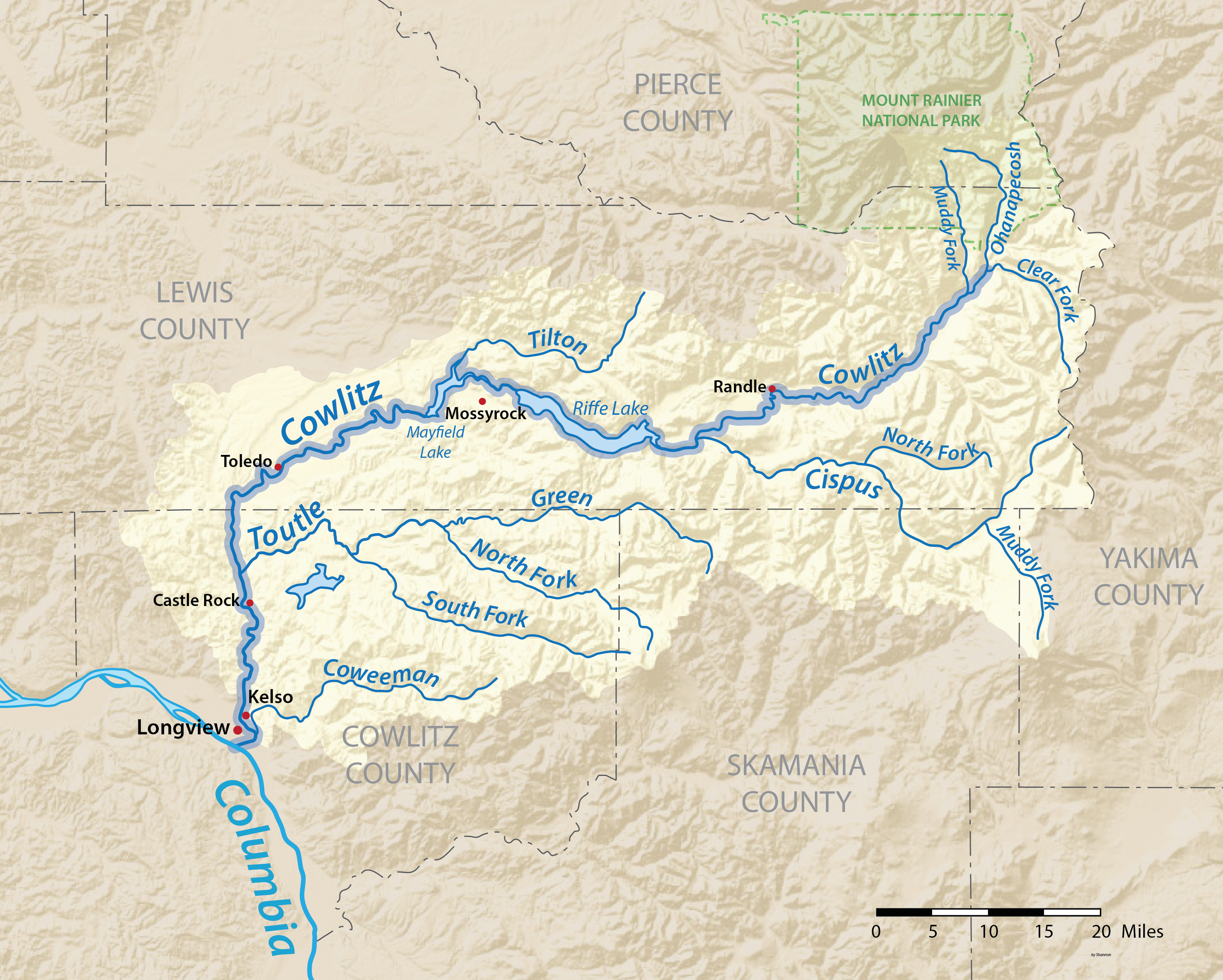
- Map of the Cowlitz River watershed

- Mouth of the Cowlitz River in Washington
- Etymology: from the Salish, tawallitch, perhaps meaning "capturing the medicine spirit"

Location
- Country: United States
- State: Washington
- Region: Lewis County, Cowlitz County
- Cities: Packwood, Randle, Mossyrock, Toledo, Castle Rock, Longview, Kelso

Physical characteristics
- Source
  - location: Packwood
  - coordinates: 46°39′16″N 121°37′13″W
  - elevation: 1,190 ft (360 m)
- Mouth: Columbia River
  - location: Longview
  - coordinates: 46°5′52″N 122°54′40″W
  - elevation: 3 ft (0.91 m)
- Length: 105 mi (169 km)
- Basin size: 2,586 sq mi (6,700 km^{2})
- Discharge
  - location: Castle Rock
  - average: 9,122 cu ft/s (258.3 m^{3}/s)
  - minimum: 998 cu ft/s (28.3 m^{3}/s)
  - maximum: 139,000 cu ft/s (3,900 m^{3}/s)

Basin features
- Tributaries
  - left: Cispus River, Toutle River
  - right: Tilton River

The Cowlitz River is a river in the state of Washington in the United States, a tributary of the Columbia River. Its tributaries drain a large region including the slopes of Mount Rainier, Mount Adams, and Mount St. Helens.

The Cowlitz has a 2,586-square-mile (6,698 km^{2}) drainage basin, located between the Cascade Range in eastern Lewis County, Washington and the cities of Kelso and Longview. The river is roughly 105 miles (169 km) long, not counting tributaries.

Major tributaries of the Cowlitz River include the Cispus River and the Toutle River, which was overtaken by volcanic mudflows (lahars) during the May 1980 eruption of Mount St. Helens.

When the smelt spawn in the Cowlitz River, the gulls go into a feeding frenzy that lasts for weeks. Kelso, Washington is known as the "Smelt Capital of the World".

== History ==
=== Flooding ===
A flood in December 1867, according to a report by The Oregonian, was to have "lacked a few inches" over the floor of a former hotel at Olequa owned by William Pumphrey. The location, determined via GLO records, placed the flood elevation about 10 feet (3.0 m) above the modern estimated 1% probability flood elevation for that location. The flood also destroyed the settlement of Monticello on the lower Cowlitz River.

The Cowlitz River exceeded flood stage during the 2025 Pacific Northwest floods. Communities such as Packwood, where the river peaked at 12.24 feet (3.7 m) and Randle, where gauges measured a high mark of 24.17 feet (7.4 m) suffered heavy flooding as a result.

The record peak of the Cowlitz River in Packwood is recorded at 14.6 feet (4.5 m); the highest recorded peak at Randle is 25.2 feet (7.7 m), set in 2006.

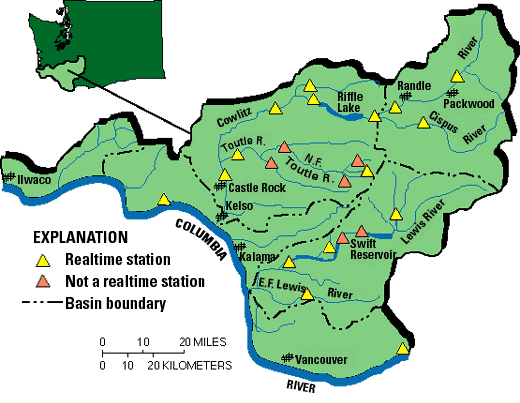
USGS stream gaging stations on the Cowlitz River

== Dams ==
The Cowlitz River has three major hydroelectric dams, with several small-scale hydropower and sediment retention structures within the Cowlitz Basin.

The Cowlitz Falls Project is a 70 megawatt hydroelectric dam built in the early 1990s and completed in 1994. The dam is 140 feet (43 m) high and 700 feet (210 m) wide. The Cowlitz Falls Project produces on average 260 GWh annually for Lewis County PUD. Its reservoir, Lake Scanewa, is located at the confluence of the Cowlitz and Cispus Rivers downstream of Randle.

Mossyrock Dam began generating power for Tacoma City Light in 1968. It rises 605 feet (184 m) from bedrock and created the 23-mile (37 km) long Riffe Lake (previously Davisson Reservoir). It is the highest dam in the Pacific Northwest. The dam is named for the nearby city of Mossyrock, and the lake for the town of Riffe, which, along with Kosmos, was destroyed by the flooding of the Cowlitz River valley above the dam.

The Mayfield Dam is 850 feet (260 m) long and 185 feet (56 m) high. An 860-foot (260 m) tunnel connects the reservoir to the powerhouse. The dam began producing electricity in 1963. Mayfield Lake offers many recreational opportunities: there are several county and state parks and the lake is below the Mossyrock Dam. The modulated inflow from the Mossyrock Dam allows Mayfield Lake to maintain a water level that rarely fluctuates more than a few feet. It is located several miles downstream of Mossyrock.

Packwood Lake was dammed in 1964 by the Washington Public Power Supply System (now called Energy Northwest). The dam holds back the lake (previously held back by an ancient landslide), redirecting streamflow to a 27 megawatt hydroelectric generator in the Cowlitz River valley floor 2,000 feet (600 m) below just outside the town of Packwood. When designing and building the dam, care was taken so as not to affect the abundant wildlife of the lake and surrounding area: the dam raised the water level by only a few feet.

A serious side effect of the Mount St. Helens 1980 eruption has been the annual downstream movement of an average of 3 million tons of sediment through the North Fork Toutle River. The rate is 10 times pre-eruption levels. The Toutle River Sediment Retention Structure was constructed to trap this sediment before it was carried farther downstream, where it could clog the river channel, exacerbate floods along the lower Toutle and Cowlitz Rivers, and fill the Columbia River shipping channel, which still requires periodic dredging. An overflow channel has been added to divert lahars around the dam. As of 2025, the efficiency of the retention dam in capturing ash sediment has fallen from 80% to 20%. Downstream communities, such as Castle Rock, Longview, and Toutle, have seen increasing contamination in their water supply and difficulties in maintaining water infrastructure due to the subsequent increase of downstream sediment.

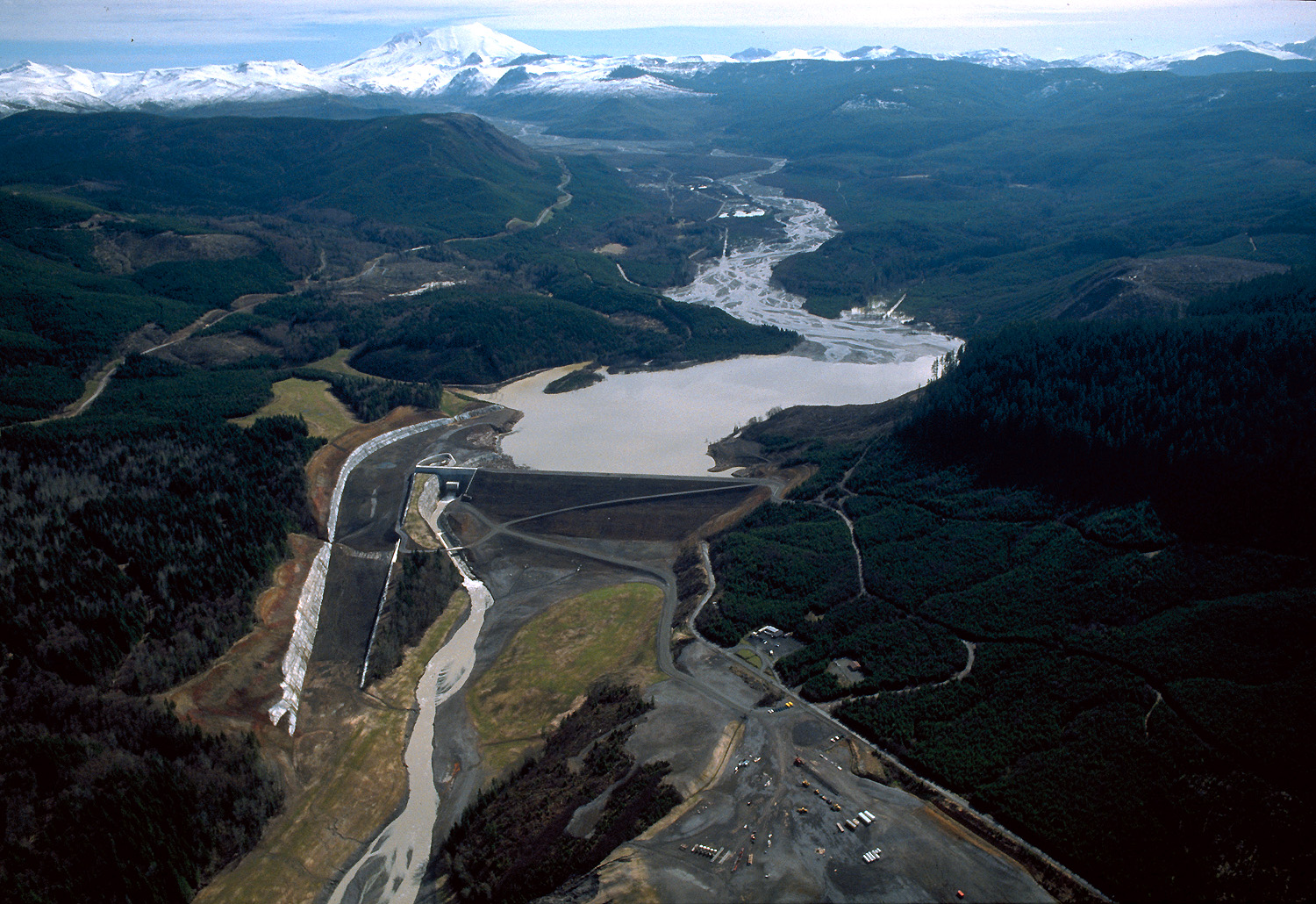
Sediment retention structure on the North Fork Toutle River, 1990

== Bridges ==
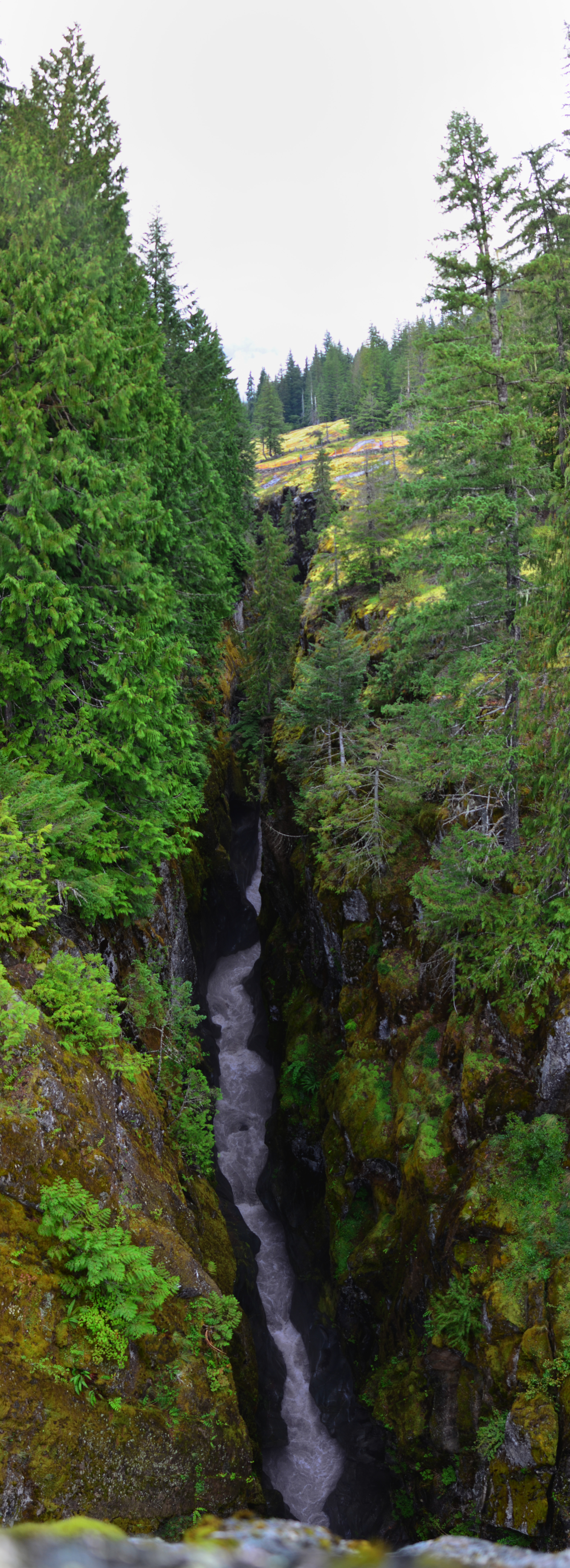
Box Canyon at Cowlitz River, 2019. The bottom of the panorama looks approximately 180 feet (55 m) straight down.

Just upstream from its mouth at the Columbia river, a railroad bridge connecting the Port of Longview to the BNSF rail line crosses the Cowlitz, with a road bridge for SR 432 (Tennant Way) beside. Further upstream are the Allen St. and Cowlitz Way bridges, connecting West Kelso with the rest of Kelso. Just north of Kelso, a railroad bridge provides crossing for the Columbia & Cowlitz Railroad.

Connecting SR 411 to Interstate 5 (I-5) is the Lexington bridge, a two-lane bridge between the large unincorporated community of Lexington to Exit 42 on the east side of the bank.

At Castle Rock, the A St. bridge provides access from downtown to the school and residential areas across the river. A few miles north, after the Toutle River split, the BNSF line crosses the river.

Across the Lewis and Cowlitz County line, between the towns of Vader and Toledo, the interstate crosses the river. At Toledo, SR 505 crosses the river as well.

Where U.S. Route 12 crosses Mayfield Lake, just west of Mossyrock, causeways were built out to the middle of the lake, where a short bridge section connects the two sides. A small bridge provides a crossing for SR 122 at the head of Mayfield Lake. Just east of Mossyrock, the Cowlitz River Bridge on US 12 was the largest concrete arch bridge in North America until 1971 at 550 feet (170 m).

At the head of Riffe Lake, the 27 Road provides access to the forestland south of the Cowlitz from Morton and Glenoma to the north.

At Randle, SR 131 crosses the Cowlitz to provide access to the Cispus basin and the northern areas of the Mount St. Helens National Volcanic Monument. Between Randle and Packwood, US 12 crosses the Cowlitz at the Cora bridge. At Packwood, Skate Creek Road spans the river, providing access to the Gifford Pinchot National Forest and Tatoosh Wilderness, as well as connecting the downtown and residential areas of Packwood. Upstream from Packwood, the Cowlitz splits into the Muddy and Clear Forks, with several Forest Service and Park Service roads crossing each.

== Other river structures ==
When the Cowlitz Salmon Hatchery began operation in 1968, it was the largest of its kind in the world. Currently, it produces nearly 13 million fish each year. Adjacent to the hatchery is the barrier dam, which diverts spawning and upriver migrating fish to a separating station where fish are sorted by species. Some of the fish are used by the hatchery, while others are transported upstream to continue migration.

The Bonneville Power Administration, in cooperation with the Lewis County PUD, state and federal agencies and Tacoma Power, constructed a downstream anadromous fish collection facility as part of the Cowlitz Falls Project. The fish facility, along with the Cowlitz River Salmon Hatchery's diversion dam below Mayfield Lake, has permitted the reintroduction of salmon and steelhead in the upper Cowlitz River basin for the first time since the construction of the Mossyrock and Mayfield dams in the 1960s.

== Tributaries and bodies of water ==
- Cispus River
- Coweeman River
- Lake Creek
- Johnson Creek
- Lacamas Creek
- Ohanapecosh River
- Olequa Creek
- Salmon Creek
- Sulphur Creek
- Tilton River
- Toutle River
- Winston Creek

== Conservation ==
Efforts to restore aquatic and floodplain habitats at Salmon Creek, a tributary of the Cowlitz River, began under the Cascade Forest Conservancy. Approximately 2 miles (3.2 km) of the stream's watershed is to be replanted, creating a "more varied" ecosystem. The project is due in part to a more than $330,000 grant in 2025 from the Washington State Salmon Recovery Funding Board and the Puget Sound Partnership.

== Recreation ==
The Cowlitz River's two hatcheries provide sportfishing opportunities for recreational anglers in Washington and Oregon. The river consistently ranks as one of the states top ten steelhead and salmon producers.

== See also ==
- List of geographic features in Lewis County, Washington
- List of rivers of Washington (state)
- Tributaries of the Columbia River
