= North Fork Toutle River =

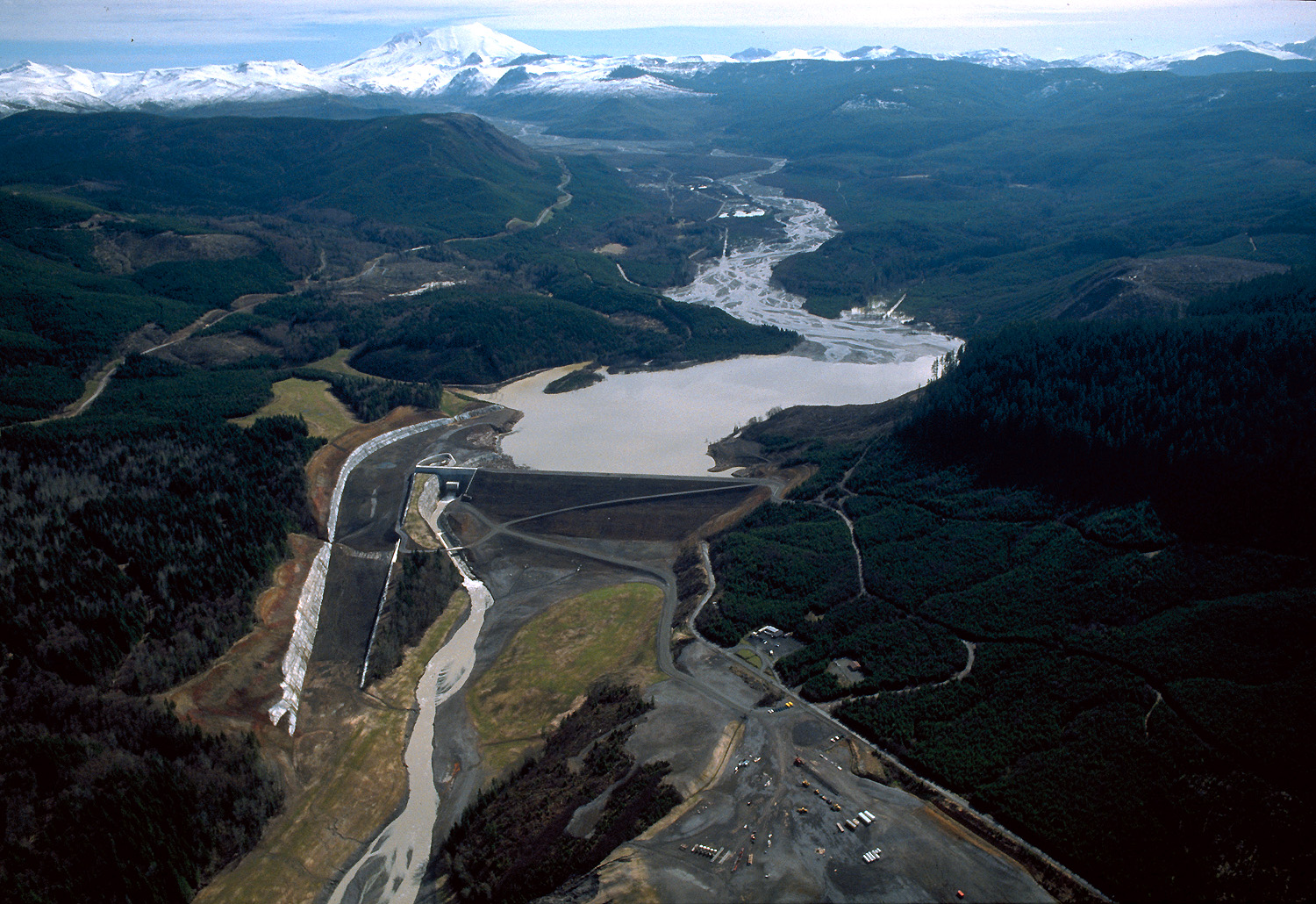
- Sediment retention dam

- Location of the mouth of North Fork Toutle River in Washington

Location
- Country: United States
- State: Washington
- County: Skamania, Cowlitz

Physical characteristics
- Source: Spirit Lake (before 1980)
  - location: Mount St. Helens National Volcanic Monument, Gifford Pinchot National Forest, Skamania County
  - coordinates: 46°15′54″N 122°09′39″W
  - elevation: 3,449 ft (1,051 m)
- Mouth: Toutle River
  - location: near Toutle, Cowlitz County
  - coordinates: 46°19′40″N 122°43′00″W
  - elevation: 443 ft (135 m)
- Length: 39 mi (63 km)
- Basin size: 302 sq mi (780 km^{2})

The North Fork Toutle River is a tributary of the Toutle River in southwestern Washington in the United States. The river has its headwaters near Spirit Lake, on the north side of Mount St. Helens, and flows 39 miles (63 km) to the Toutle River, about 17 miles (27 km) upstream of its confluence with the Cowlitz River. The largest tributary is the Green River, which joins near the unincorporated town of Toutle.

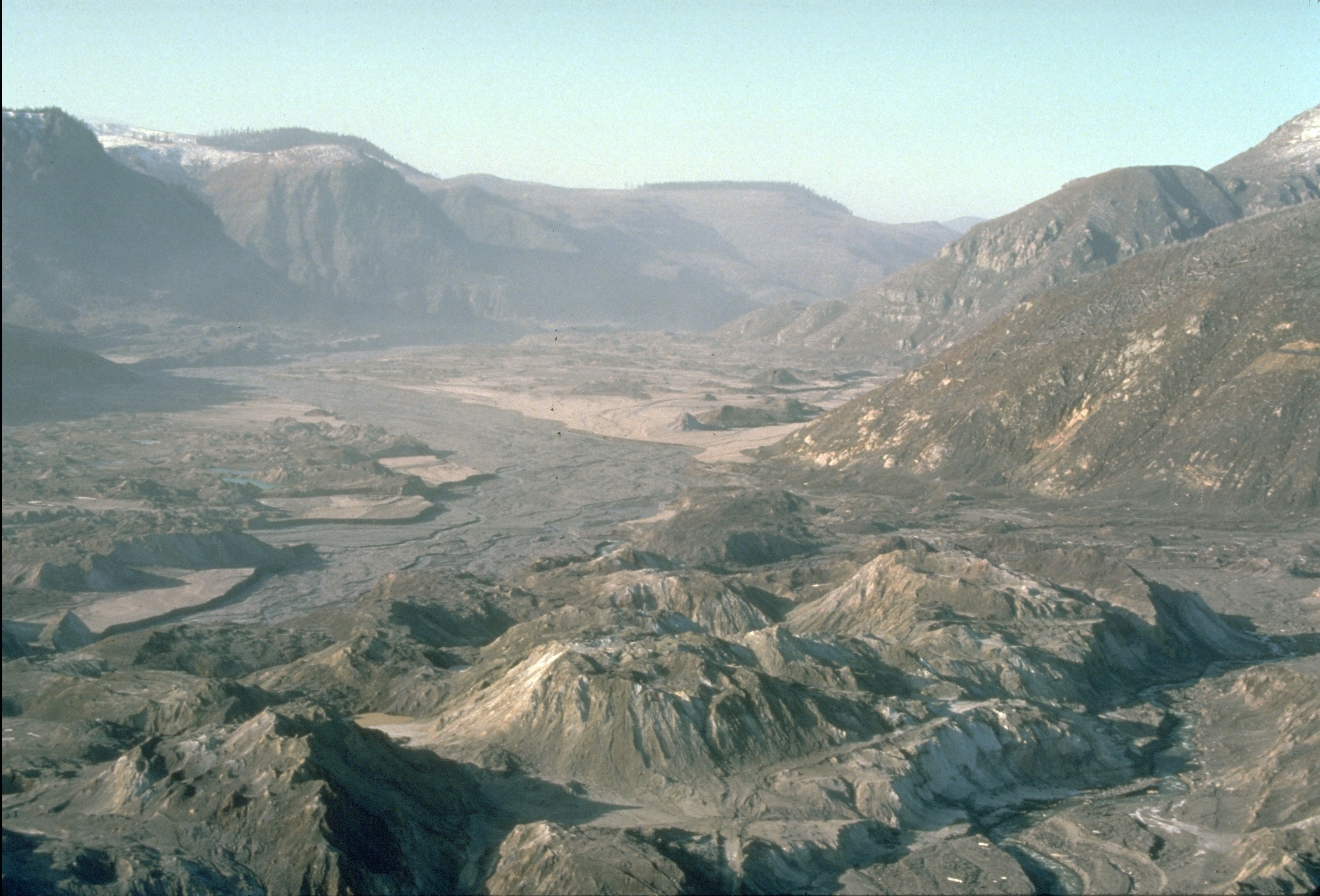
The results of the 1980 eruption were still prevalent in 1983, where the valley is seen still coated with volcanic ash

The North Fork's watershed was severely affected by the 1980 eruption of Mount St. Helens, which coated the valley with ash and filled it with successive mudflows. The result of the eruption was that many hillsides were stripped of forest, and as a result erosion has increased dramatically and the North Fork is now extremely laden with sediment. Previously, Spirit Lake was the source of the river, but eruptions blocked the outlet and Spirit Lake no longer drains directly into the North Fork; instead, a tunnel was excavated in 1985 to connect the lake with South Coldwater Creek, a tributary of the North Fork. Once a mature river, the North Fork has transformed into a braided stream of relatively young origin, and its valley floor is less than three decades old. The Toutle River Sediment Retention Structure was built by the U.S. Army Corps of Engineers on the river in 1989 to prevent this sediment from traveling downstream and clogging the shipping channel of the Columbia River.

The upper part of the North Fork Toutle River watershed was redirected to the crater of Mount St. Helens itself until 1982. The river's headstreams begin on a volcanic ash deposit roughly 3 miles (5 km) long and 200 feet (61 m) deep, which is the source of much of the excess sediment.

== See also ==
- List of rivers of Washington (state)
- List of tributaries of the Columbia River
