= Toutle River =

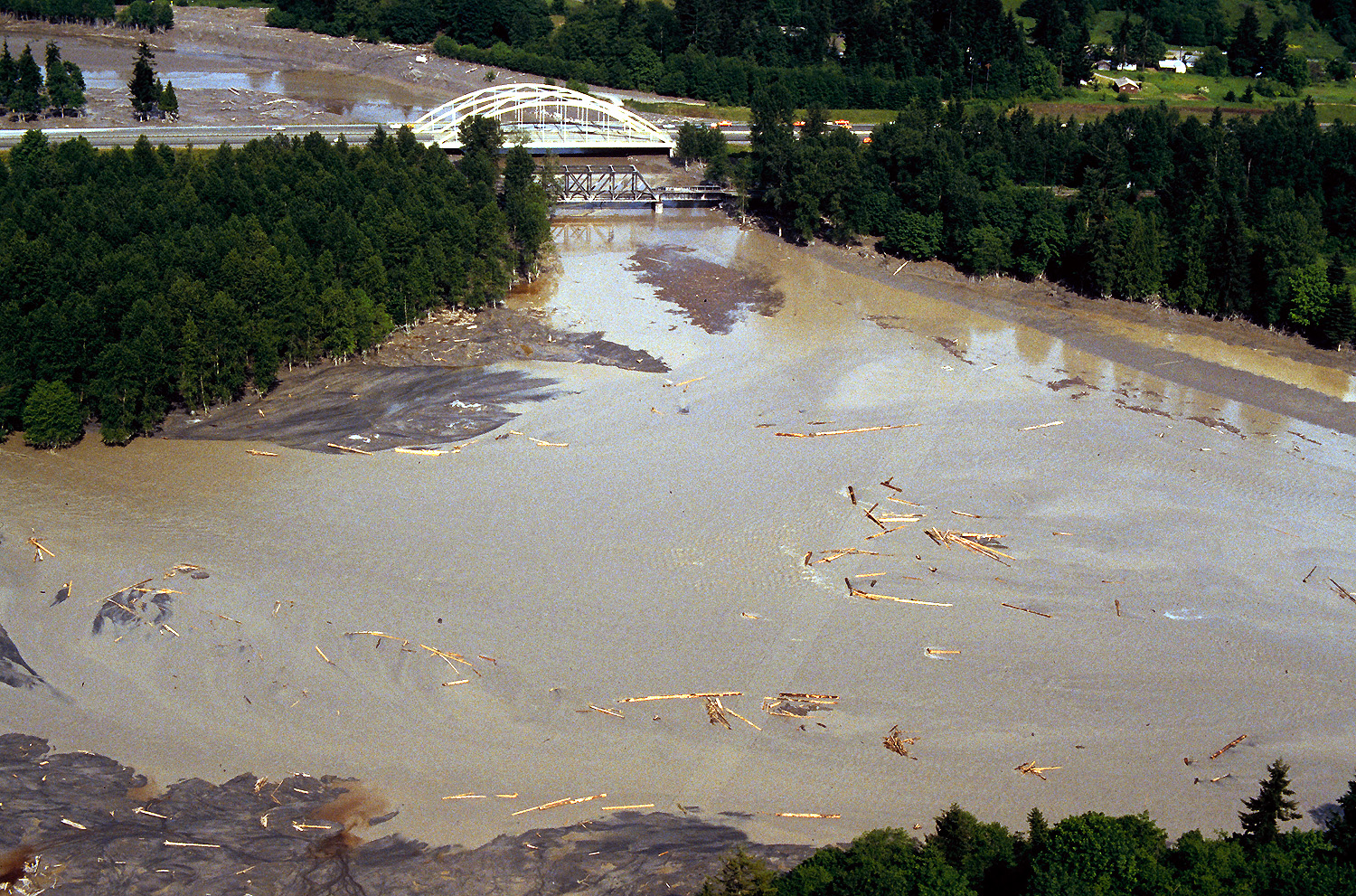
- Mouth of the river in flood near Castle Rock before the 1980 eruption of Mount St. Helens

- Location of the mouth of Toutle River in Washington
- Etymology: A Native American subgroup called Hullooetell by Lewis and Clark

Location
- Country: United States
- State: Washington
- County: Cowlitz

Physical characteristics
- Source: Confluence of North and South forks
  - location: near Toutle
  - coordinates: 46°19′40″N 122°43′03″W
  - elevation: 440 ft (130 m)
- Mouth: Cowlitz River
  - location: near Castle Rock
  - coordinates: 46°18′39″N 122°55′06″W
  - elevation: 46 ft (14 m)
- Length: 17.2 mi (27.7 km)
- Basin size: 511 sq mi (1,320 km^{2})
- Discharge
  - location: 6.5 miles (10.5 km) from the mouth
  - average: 2,095 cu ft/s (59.3 m^{3}/s)
  - minimum: 243 cu ft/s (6.9 m^{3}/s)
  - maximum: 61,800 cu ft/s (1,750 m^{3}/s)

The Toutle River is a 17.2-mile (27.7 km) tributary of the Cowlitz River in the U.S. state of Washington. It rises in two forks merging near Toutle below Mount St. Helens and joins the Cowlitz near Castle Rock, 20 miles (32 km) upstream of the larger river's confluence with the Columbia River.

The river was altered by the 1980 eruption of Mount St. Helens, a nearby volcano, and subsequent flows of ash and other debris. It was further altered by dredging to remove sediment, and by construction of the Toutle River Sediment Retention Structure on the North Fork Toutle River.

== Course ==
The Toutle River begins at the confluence of the North Fork Toutle River and the South Fork Toutle River near the community of Toutle. The forks originate on Mount St. Helens in Mount St. Helens National Volcanic Monument, and flow generally west to form the main stem, which continues generally west, with significant north–south deviations. The town of Toutle lies to the left of the river at river mile (RM) 17.2 or river kilometer (RK) 27.7.

At first the Toutle River flows north for about 1 mile (2 km) along the base of Beigle Mountain, which is on its right. The river continues generally north until, at about RM 13 (RK 21), it begins a sweeping turn to the southwest. For the next several miles, Tower Road runs along the right bank of the river, and at about RM 10 (RK 16) Tower Cemetery is on the right. Downstream of the cemetery, the river passes through Hollywood Gorge, where Rock Creek enters from the right. The river continues southwest through RM 7 (RK 11), where it receives Stankey Creek from the left.

The Toutle River then turns west, passing under Tower Road and receiving Cline Creek from the right. Over the next stretch, Burma Road is on the right. Over its final 4 miles (6 km), the Toutle meanders generally southwest through large deposits of sand. The stream passes under Barnes Drive and then Interstate 5 before entering the Cowlitz River about 2 miles (3 km) upstream from the city of Castle Rock. Below the confluence, the Cowlitz continues for 20 miles (32 km), entering the Columbia River about 68 miles (109 km) from its mouth on the Pacific Ocean.

=== Discharge ===
The United States Geological Survey monitors the flow of the Toutle River at a stream gauge at RM 6.5 (RK 10.5). The average flow of the river is 2,095 cubic feet per second (59.3 m^{3}/s). This is from a drainage area of 416 square miles (1,080 km^{2}), about 81 percent of the total Toutle River watershed. The maximum flow recorded there was 61,800 cubic feet per second (1,750 m^{3}/s) on Feb. 8, 1996, and the minimum flow was 243 cubic feet per second (6.88 m^{3}/s) on Oct. 14, 1987. This data covers a 30-year period that began in 1981, after the volcanic eruption. Extremes outside the period of record include two large floods on May 18, 1980, related to volcanic mud flows that came down the South Fork and then the North Fork, spaced nine hours apart.

== Volcanic sediment ==
The eruption of Mount St. Helens and subsequent lahars poured vast amounts of sediment into the Toutle. The United States Army Corps of Engineers dredged sediment from the river and built the $65 million Toutle River Sediment Retention Structure on the North Fork Toutle River to prevent debris from continuing downstream.

Part of the same engineering works is a tunnel to drain Spirit Lake, on the north side of the volcano, after the eruption blocked the lake's natural outlet.

== Gallery ==
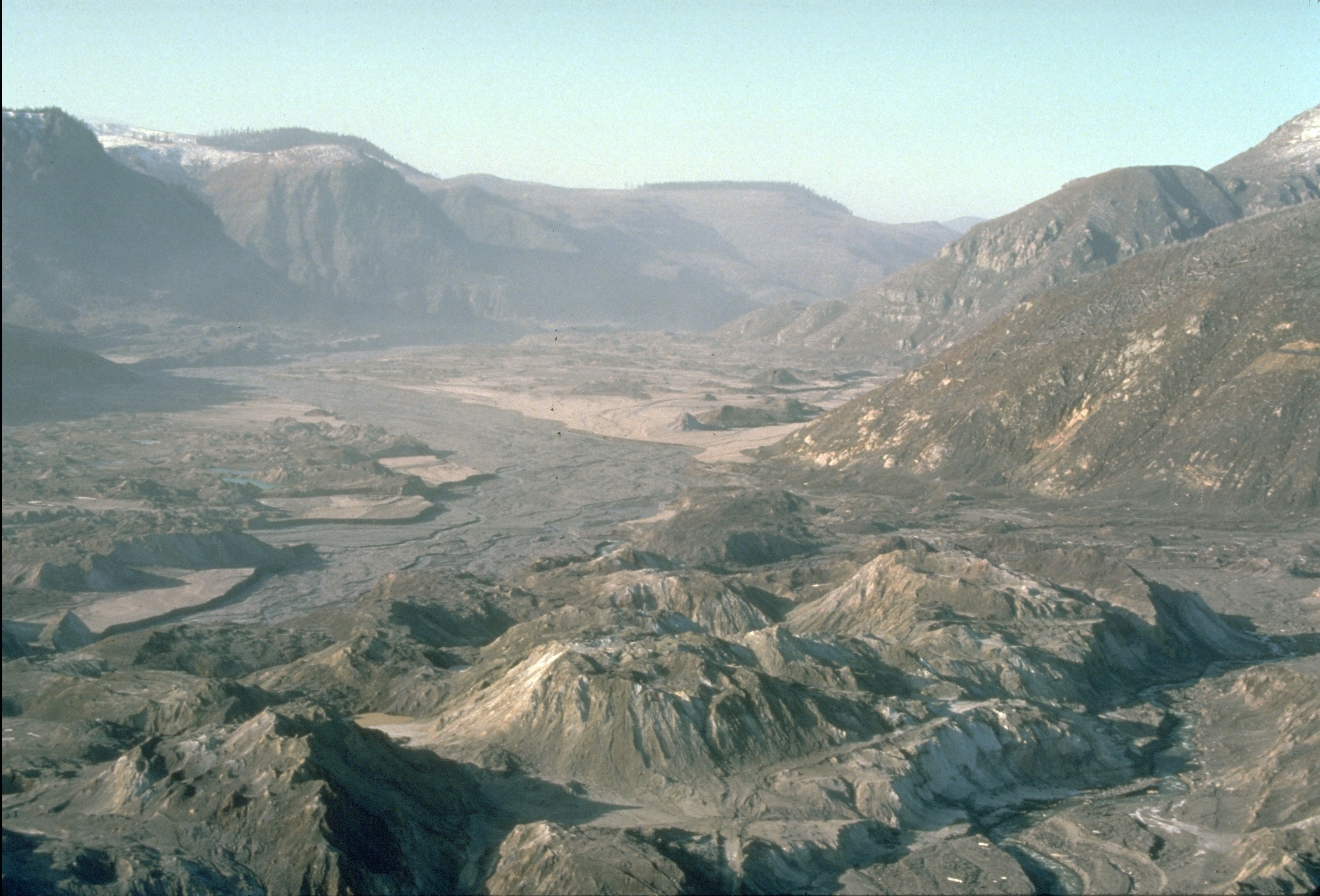
North Fork Toutle River valley, filled with Mount St. Helens landslide debris and hummocks.

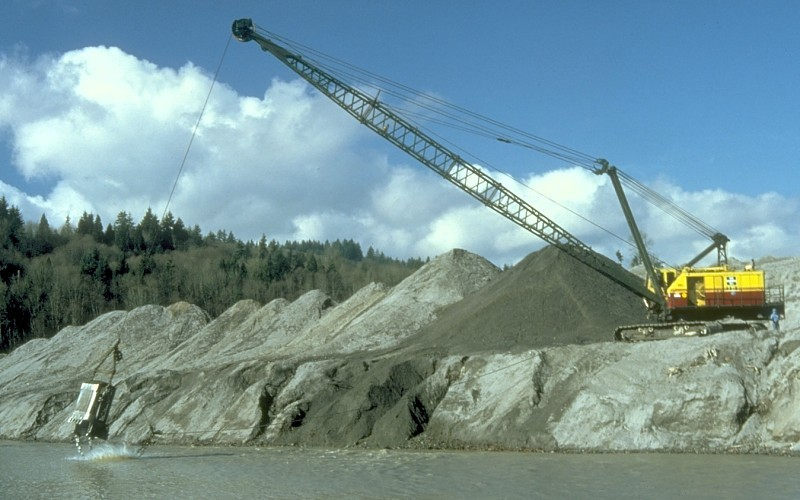
Dredging the Toutle River of volcanic ash.

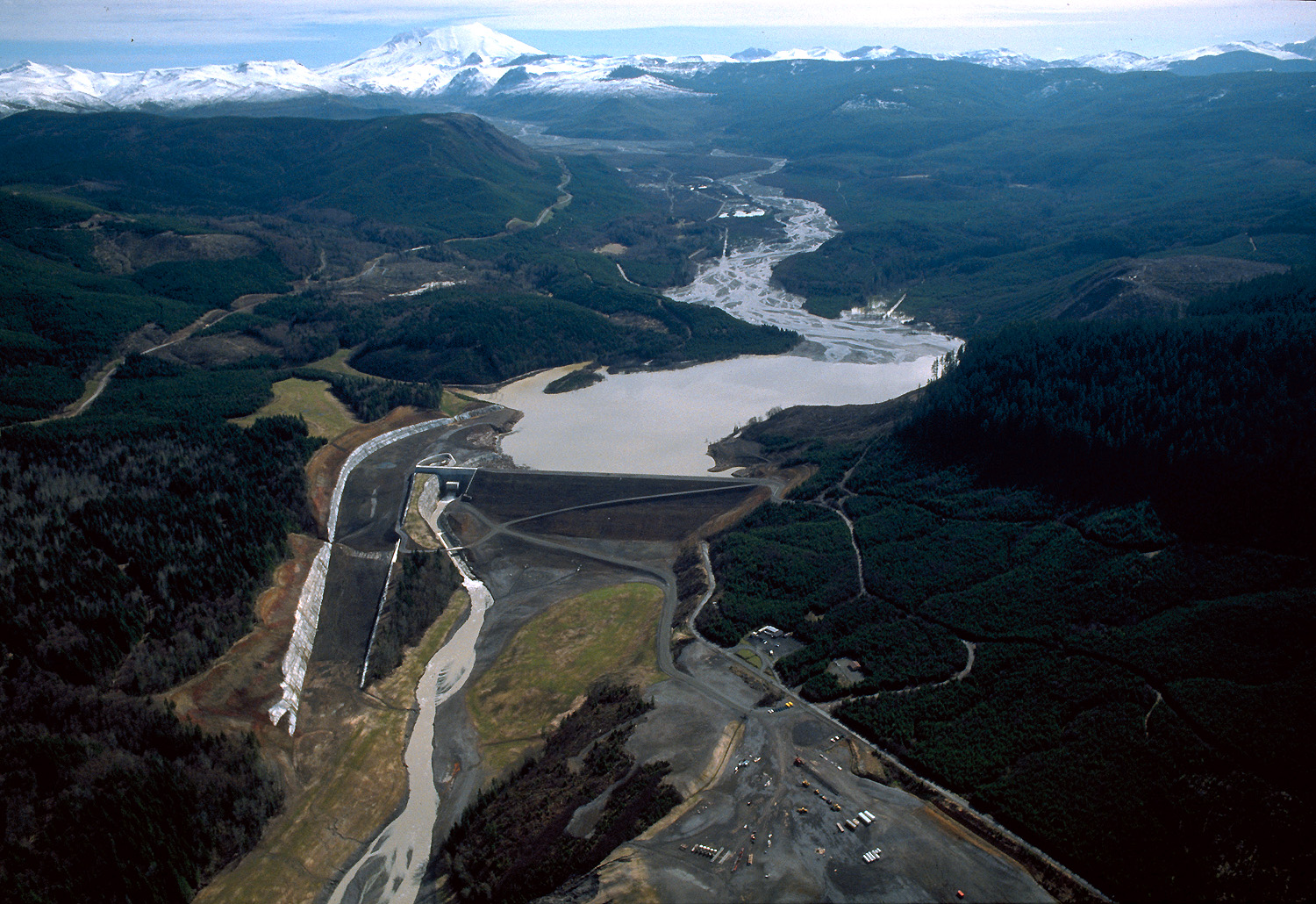
The Sediment Retention Structure on the North Fork.

== See also ==
- North Fork Toutle River
- List of rivers of Washington (state)
- List of tributaries of the Columbia River
- Mount St. Helens National Volcanic Monument
