= Spirit Lake (Washington) =

Lake in Skamania County, Washington, U.S.

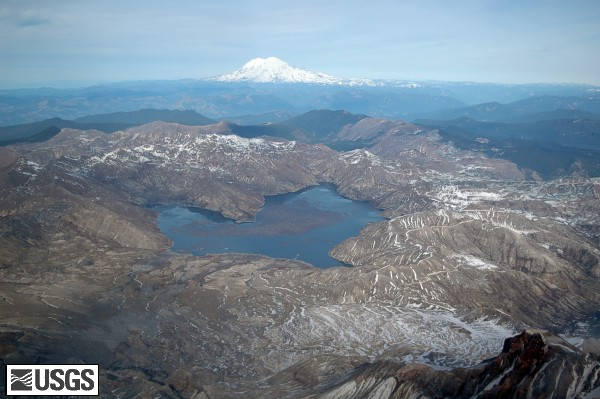
- Aerial view of the lake in 2005

- Location in Washington state Spirit Lake (the United States)
- Location: Mount St. Helens National Volcanic Monument, Skamania County, Washington, U.S.
- Coordinates: 46°16′23″N 122°08′06″W
- Primary inflows: Precipitation, streams
- Primary outflows: Drainage tunnel to South Coldwater Creek
- Basin countries: United States
- Surface elevation: 3,406 feet (1,038 m) (3,198 ft (975 m) before May 18, 1980)

Spirit Lake is a lake in Skamania County, Washington, United States, located north of Mount St. Helens. It was a popular tourist destination for many years until Mount St. Helens erupted in 1980. Previously there had been six camps on the shore of Spirit Lake: Boy Scout (Camp Spirit Lake), the Girl Scout Camp at Spirit Lake, two YMCA camps (Camp Loowit, and Portland YMCA camp), Harmony Fall Lodge, and another for the general public. There were also several lodges accessible to visitors, including Spirit Lake Lodge and Mt. St. Helens Lodge. The latter was owned and operated by Harry R. Truman, a noted victim of the volcano's 1980 eruption.

== Human history ==
The body of water was named "Spirit" by settlers after histories from Native American people in the area spoke of haunting spirits at the lake. The spirits, telling a story of life and death, formed out of the mists into various shapes of trees and animals, foretelling impending doom but good fortune in the afterlife. Any person who saw the apparitions was dead within a week.

A post office named Spirit Lake existed for a brief time, renamed to "Lange" in 1910 after the postmaster. Early mining around the lake began at the turn of the 20th century and necessitated the first road to the area in 1901, replacing a treacherous trail considered unfit for wagons.

== Geologic history ==
Prior to 1980, Spirit Lake consisted of two arms that occupied what had been the valleys of the North Fork Toutle River and a tributary. About 4,000 years ago, these valleys were blocked by lahars and pyroclastic flow deposits from Mount St. Helens to form the pre-1980 Spirit Lake. The longest branch of Spirit Lake was about 2.1 miles (3.4 km) long. A stable outlet channel flowed from the lake to the North Fork Toutle River across a natural dam composed of volcanic material. The level of Spirit Lake remained basically stable, at an altitude of about 3,198 ft (970 m).

== 1980 Mount St. Helens eruption ==
During the May 18, 1980, eruption of Mount St. Helens, Spirit Lake received the full impact of the lateral blast from the volcano. The blast and the debris avalanche associated with this eruption temporarily displaced much of the lake from its bed and forced lake waters as a wave as much as 850 ft (260 m) above lake level on the mountain slopes along the north shoreline of the lake. The debris avalanche deposited about 430,000,000 cubic metres (350,000 acre⋅ft) of pyrolized trees, other plant material, volcanic ash, and volcanic debris of various origins into Spirit Lake. The deposition of this volcanic material decreased the lake volume by approximately 56,000,000 cubic metres (45,000 acre⋅ft).

Lahar and pyroclastic-flow deposits from the eruption blocked its natural pre-eruption outlet to the North Fork Toutle River valley at its outlet, raising the surface elevation of the lake by between 197 ft (60 m) and 206 ft (63 m). The surface area of the lake was increased from 1,300 acres (530 ha) to about 2,200 acres (890 ha) and its maximum depth decreased from 190 ft (58 m) to 110 ft (34 m). The eruption tore thousands of trees from the surrounding hillsides and swept them into Spirit Lake. These thousands of shattered trees formed a floating log raft on the lake surface that covered about 40% of the lake's surface after the eruption.

After the eruption, Spirit Lake contained highly toxic water with volcanic gases seeping up from the lake bed. A month after the eruption, the bacteria-carrying water was devoid of oxygen. Scientists predicted that the lake would not recover quickly, but the reemergence of phytoplankton starting in 1983 began to restore oxygen levels. Amphibians such as frogs and salamanders recolonized the lake, and fish (reintroduced by fishermen) thrived.

== Water levels ==
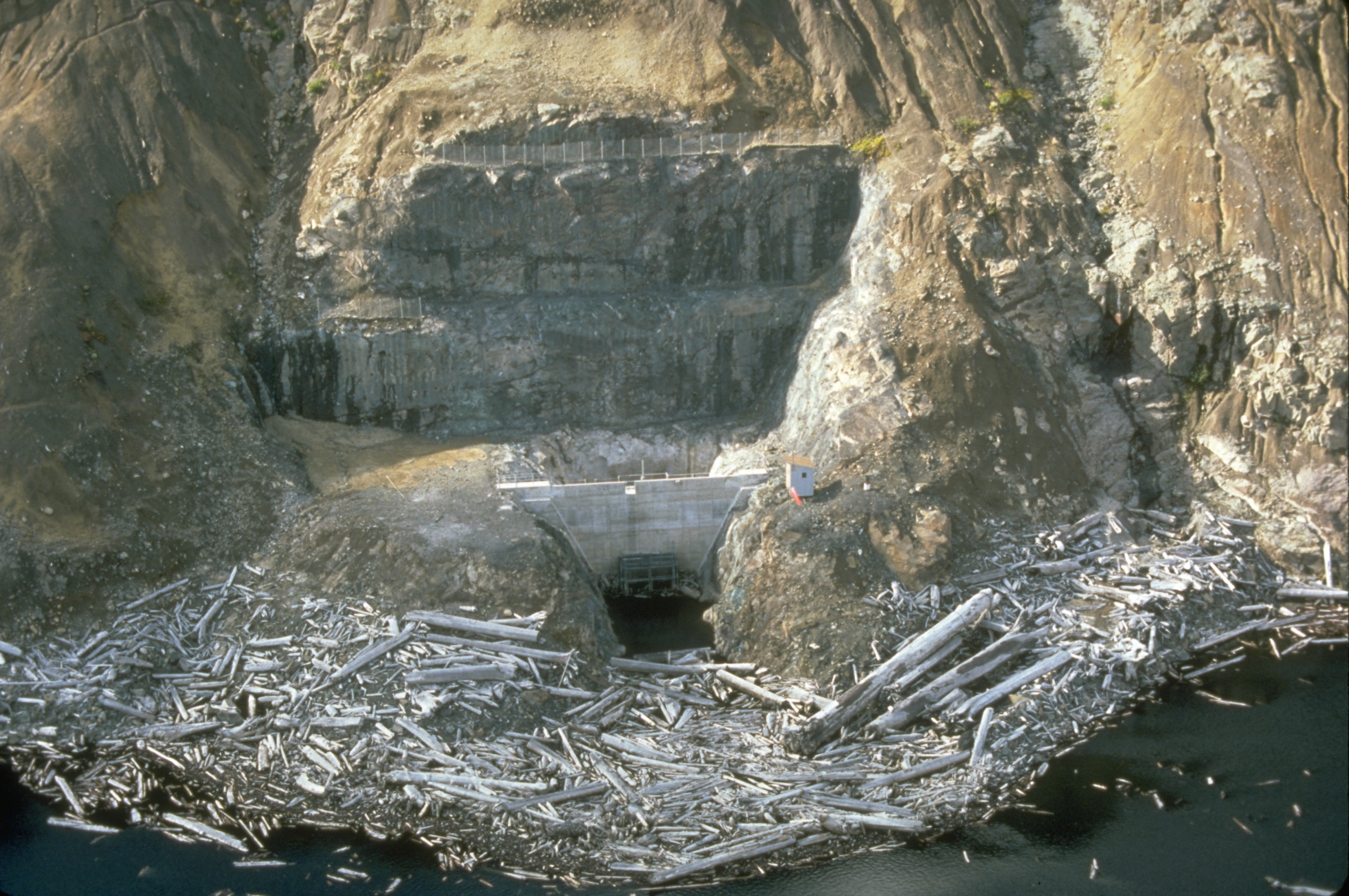
Spirit Lake outlet tunnel

The water level of Spirit Lake is maintained at about 3,406 ft (1,040 m) by draining water through Spirit Lake Outlet Tunnel, a gravity-feed tunnel completed in 1985. The 8,465-foot-long (2,580 m) tunnel was cut through Harry's Ridge to South Coldwater Creek, which flows to Coldwater Lake and into the North Fork of the Toutle River. Had the lake level not been stabilized, the dam, which was composed of volcanic avalanche debris created by the 1980 eruption, would have been breached and caused catastrophic flooding within the Toutle River Valley.

An attempt to upgrade and repair the 1985 tunnel began in 2021 but was halted due to concerns over damages to the pumice plain. The project restarted in 2024 and a temporary road, following the prior access path to the lake, will be rebuilt with future work to involve the installation of gates to the tunnel and dredging to prevent the buildup of logs. During the efforts planned through 2027, several trails surrounding the area will no longer be accessible during weekdays.

In July 2026, the USFS released a draft environmental impact statement (EIS) which outlines their preferred plan of action. The proposed project involves the construction of a permanent access route across the pumice plain, construction of a new pressurized tunnel, and the lowering of Spirit Lake by 40 feet (12 m). This could potentially split the lake into two sections. The existing tunnel would be repaired and repurposed as a backup, and the new, pressurized tunnel would serve temporarily as the lake's primary outflow. The plan also outlines a further study to reconnect Spirit Lake to the North Fork Toutle River via a natural habitat channel. The project would cross unstable ground at the foot of the volcano but would allow for the possibility of natural salmon and steelhead migration into the lake. The preferred plan is estimated to cost $265 million for the repair of the old tunnel and the construction of a new outlet. The estimate does not include the cost of the natural habitat channel. Congressional approval is required to fund the preferred plan.

== Climate ==
Pre-eruption weather data from the Spirit Lake Ranger Station indicates the area either had the rare dry-summer variant of the subarctic climate (Köppen climate classification: Dsc), or the rare cold-summer mediterranean climate (Köppen climate classification: Csc), both of which are found only in small areas across the world. Recent climate data for the area is not available to confirm whether the post-eruption site still has either one of these rare climate types.

Climate data for Spirit Lake Ranger Station, 1932-1956
Month	Jan	Feb	Mar	Apr	May	Jun	Jul	Aug	Sep	Oct	Nov	Dec	Year
Record high °F (°C)	50 (10)	55 (13)	58 (14)	77 (25)	83 (28)	90 (32)	100 (38)	94 (34)	88 (31)	85 (29)	63 (17)	55 (13)	100 (38)
Mean daily maximum °F (°C)	32.9 (0.5)	35.3 (1.8)	38.1 (3.4)	46 (8)	52.4 (11.3)	59 (15)	71.2 (21.8)	70.5 (21.4)	63.6 (17.6)	52.4 (11.3)	41 (5)	36.2 (2.3)	49.9 (9.9)
Mean daily minimum °F (°C)	24.4 (−4.2)	24.6 (−4.1)	26.1 (−3.3)	29.7 (−1.3)	33.1 (0.6)	37.6 (3.1)	44.7 (7.1)	45.2 (7.3)	41.8 (5.4)	37.1 (2.8)	31.2 (−0.4)	27.9 (−2.3)	33.6 (0.9)
Record low °F (°C)	−15 (−26)	−15 (−26)	−11 (−24)	6 (−14)	18 (−8)	27 (−3)	30 (−1)	32 (0)	28 (−2)	14 (−10)	−5 (−21)	−1 (−18)	−15 (−26)
Average precipitation inches (mm)	13.49 (343)	10.53 (267)	10.6 (270)	9.7 (250)	7.7 (200)	3.66 (93)	0.89 (23)	1.92 (49)	6.5 (170)	8.7 (220)	13.56 (344)	15.61 (396)	100.94 (2,564)
Average snowfall inches (cm)	76.9 (195)	91.4 (232)	66.7 (169)	22.4 (57)	4.7 (12)	0 (0)	0 (0)	0 (0)	0.1 (0.25)	4.8 (12)	18.9 (48)	54.8 (139)	313.0 (795)
Average precipitation days	21	19	20	15	14	12	5	6	9	14	17	19	171

== Gallery ==
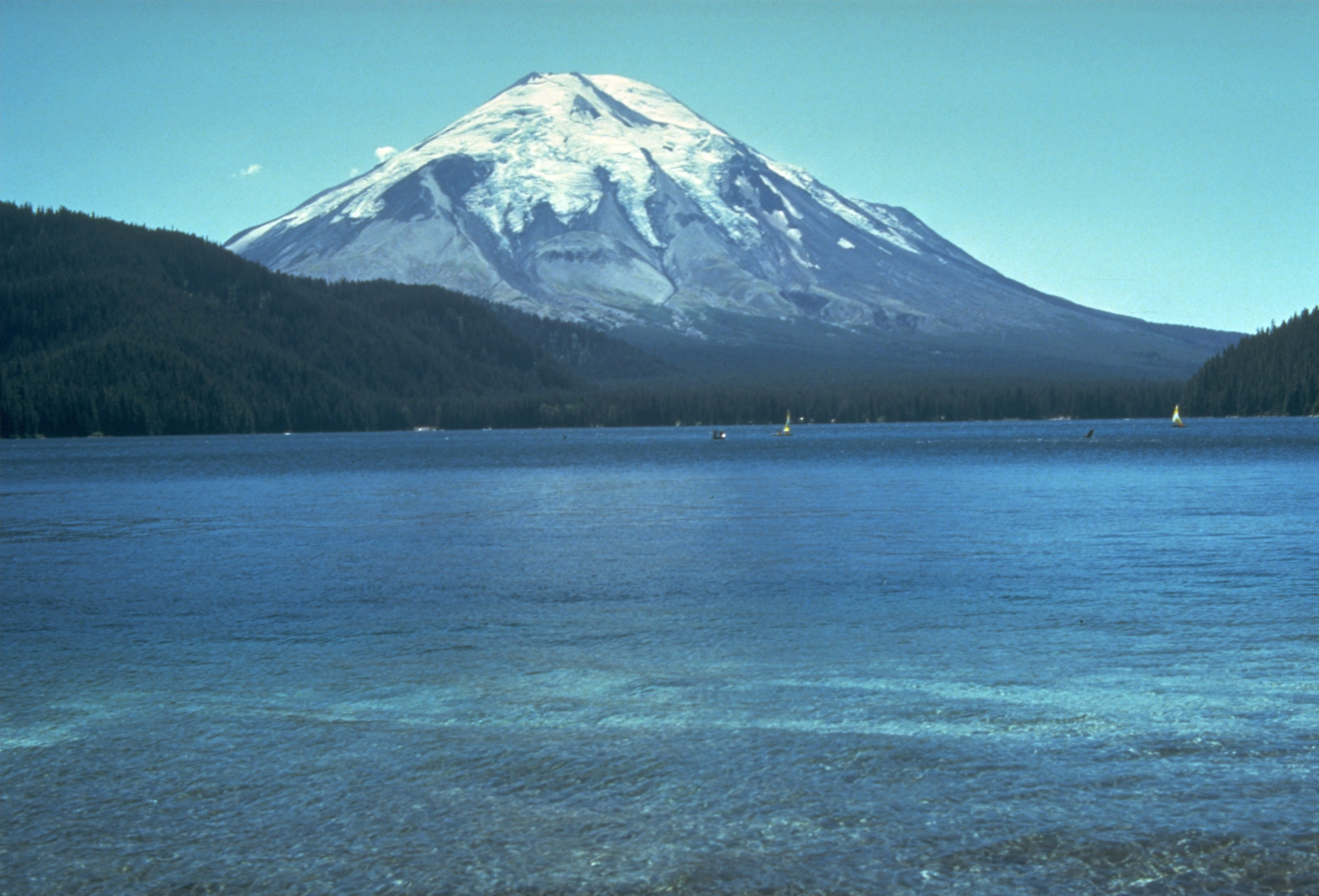
Spirit Lake prior to 1980

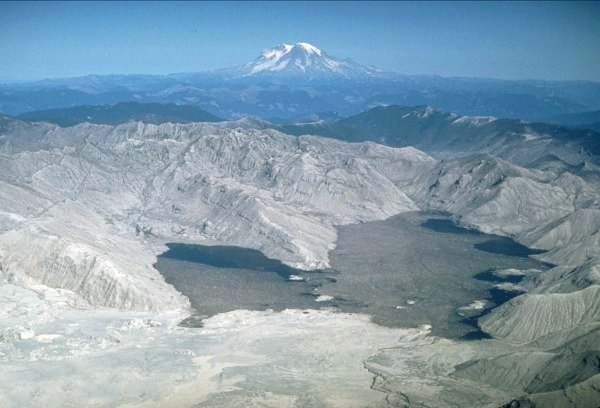
Spirit Lake filled with debris from the eruption. October 4, 1980

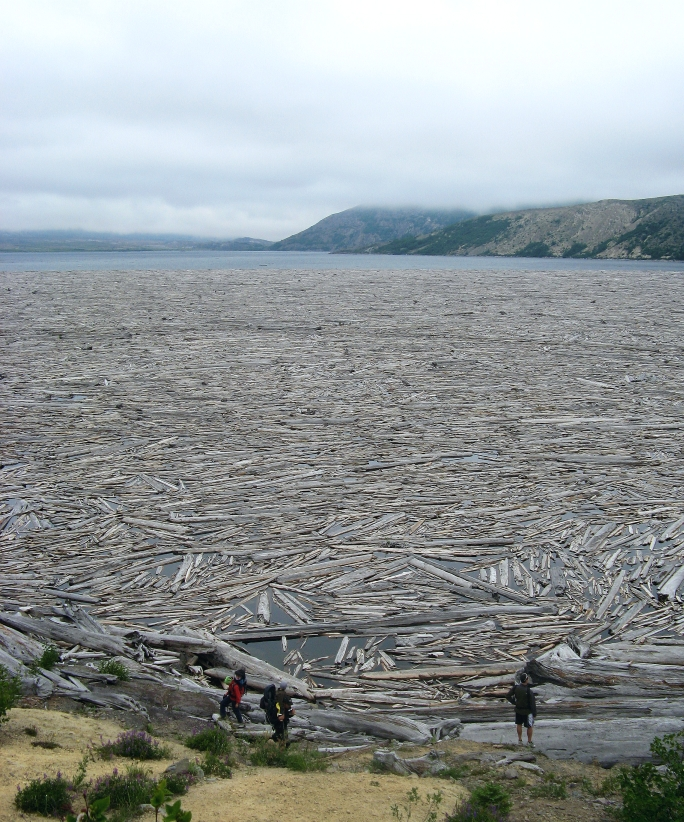
Logs covering Spirit Lake, 2009

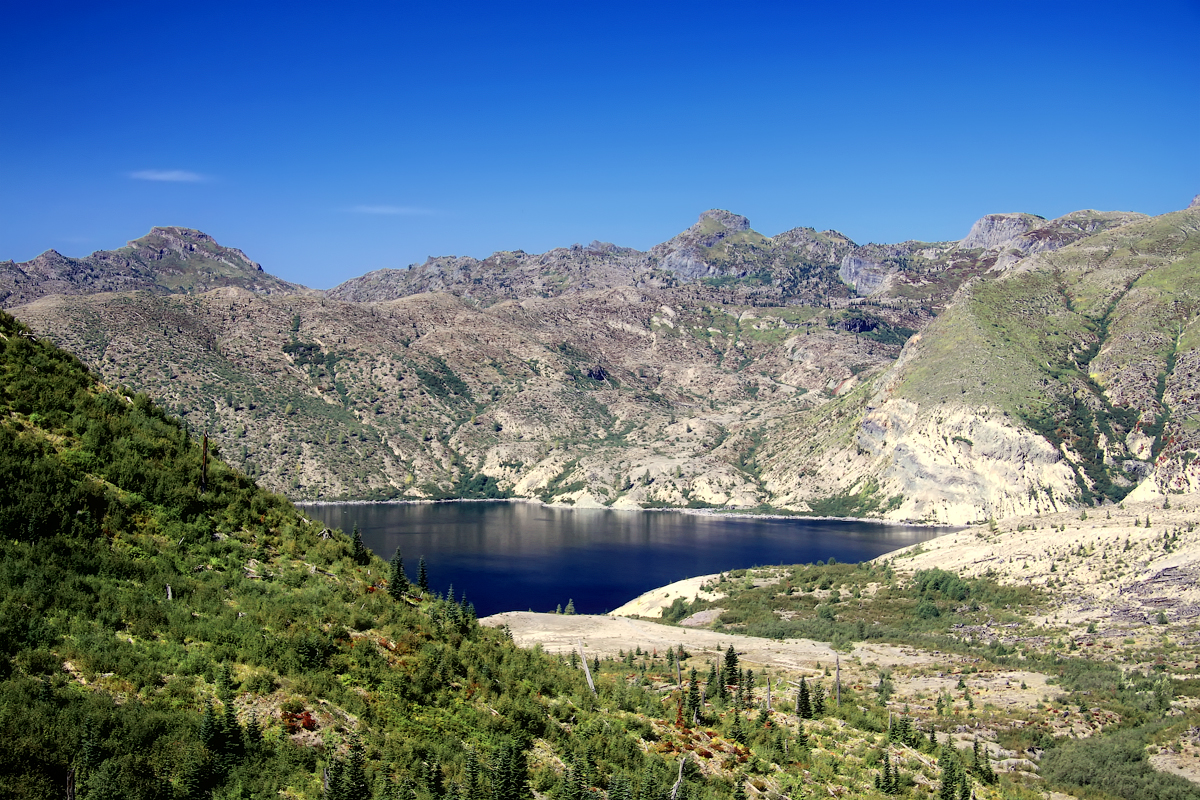
Spirit Lake

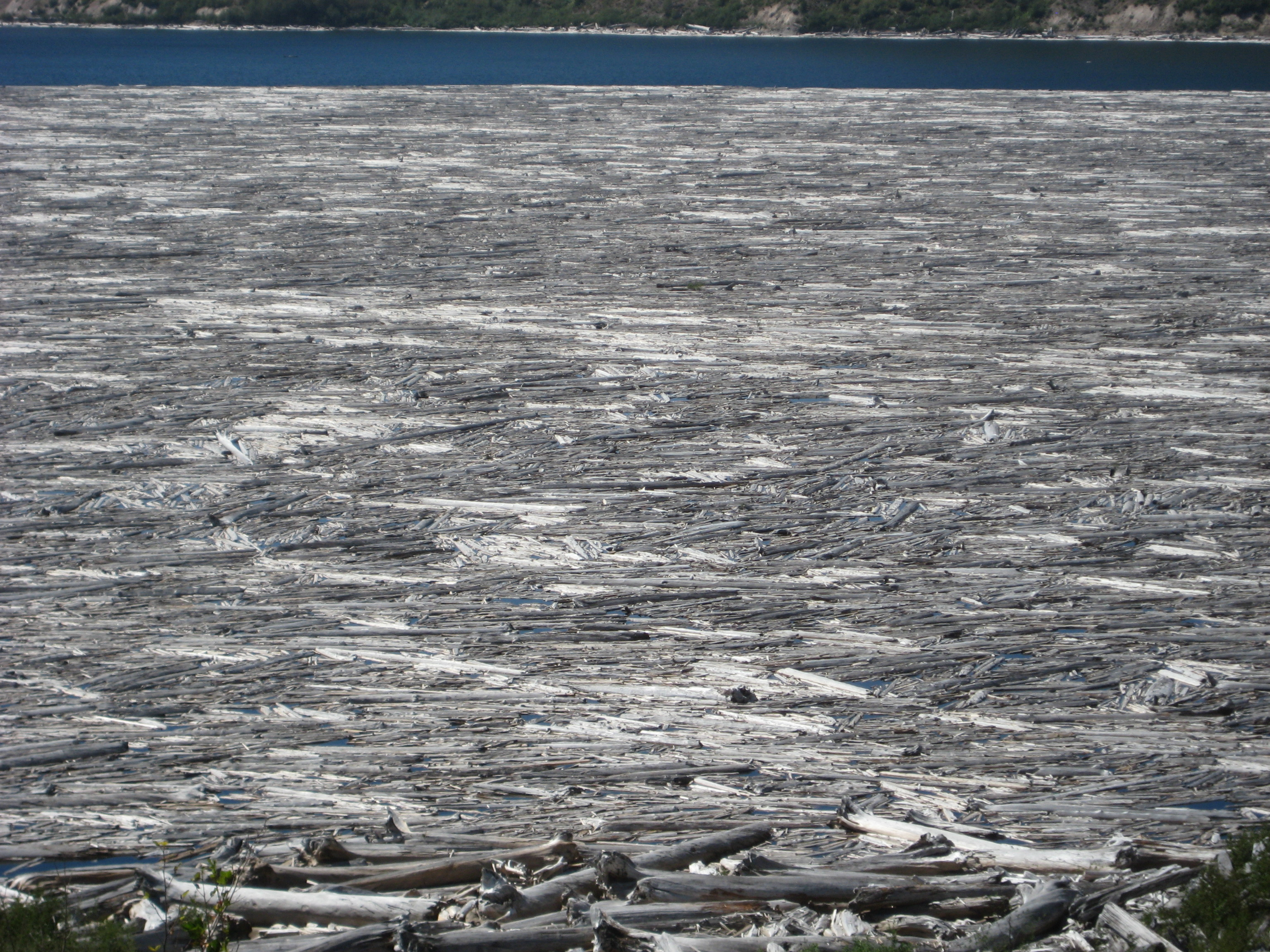
Tree mats on Spirit Lake, 2012

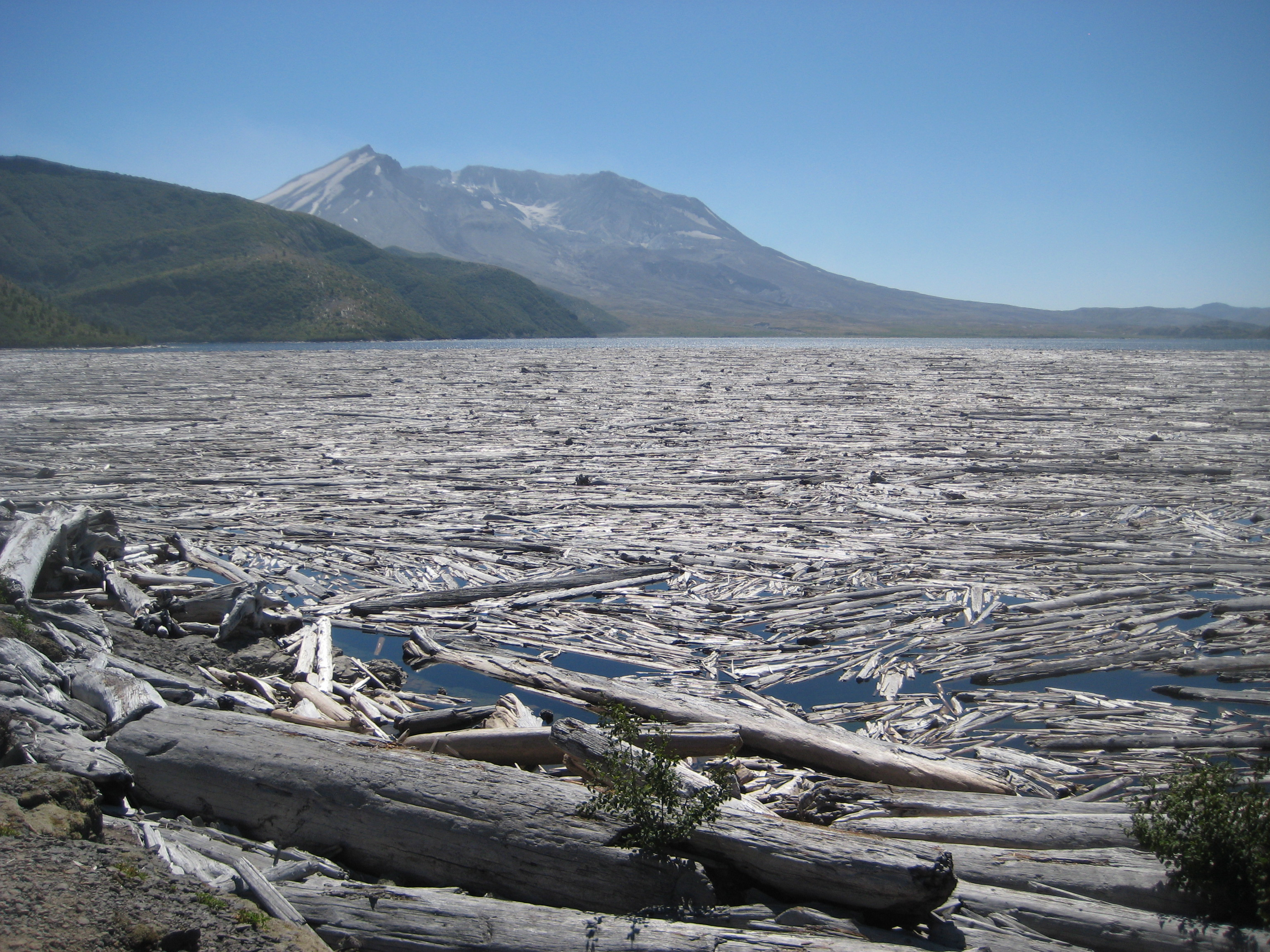
Spirit Lake with tree mats and Mount St. Helens

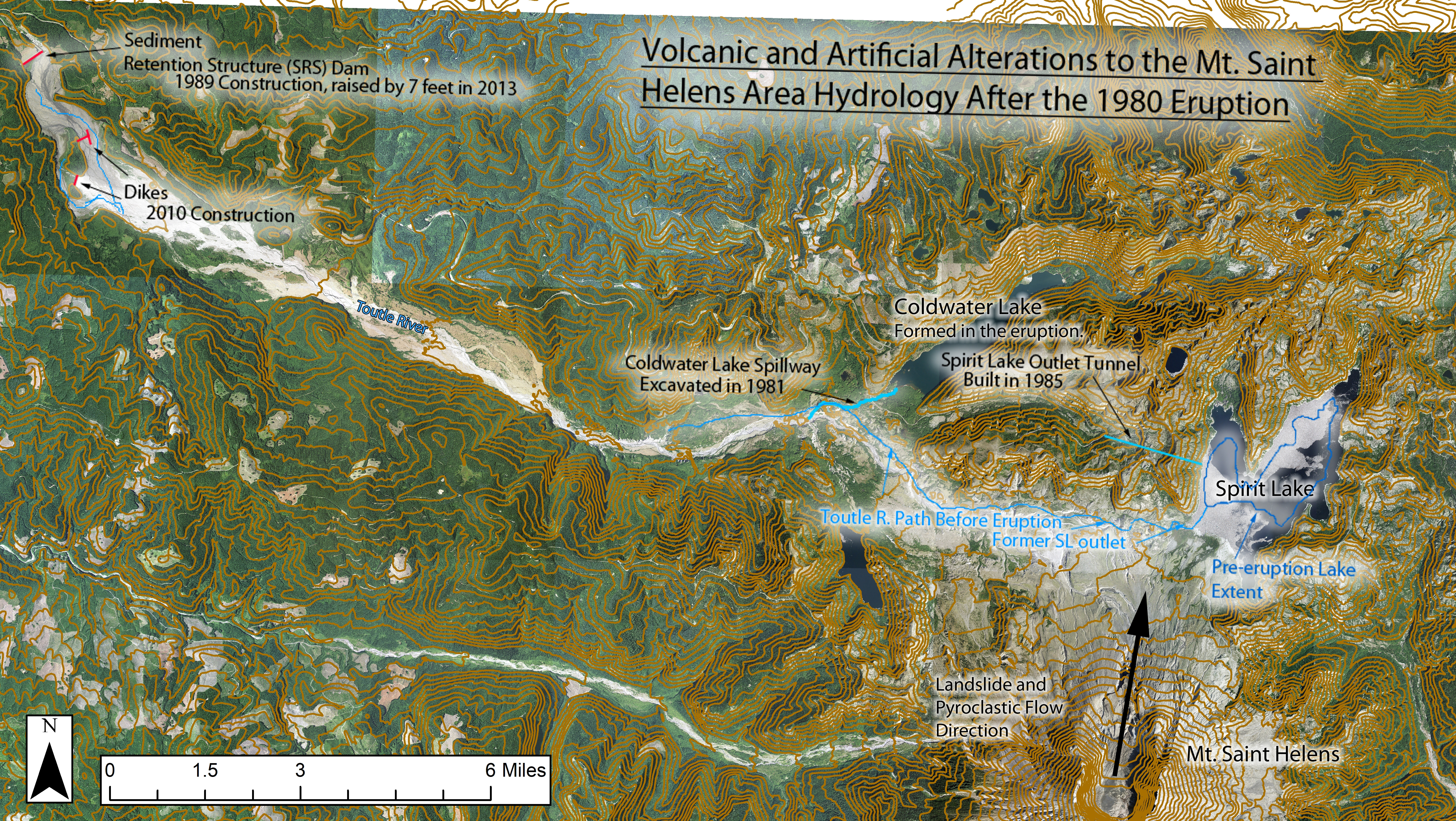
Shows the major changes in hydrology of Mount St. Helens after its 1980 eruption, including artificial modifications designed to mitigate sediment and water flow.

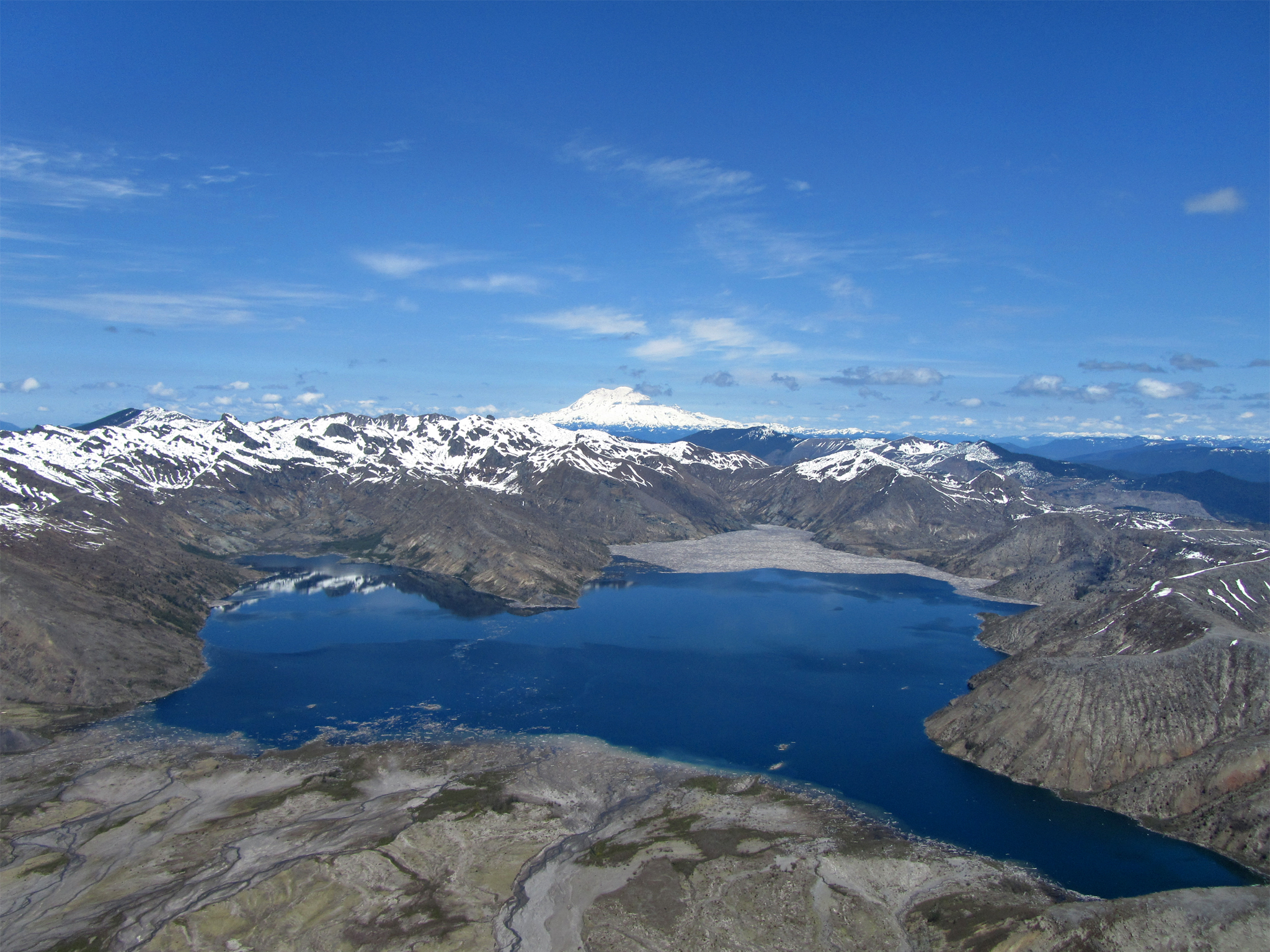
View above Spirit Lake
