= Washington State Route 432 =

State highway in Cowlitz County, Washington, US

State Route 432

- SR 432 highlighted in red

Route information
- Auxiliary route of SR 4
- Maintained by WSDOT
- Length: 10.32 mi (16.61 km)
- Existed: 1964–present
- Tourist routes: Lewis and Clark Trail

Major junctions
- West end: SR 4 in West Longview
- SR 433 in Longview; SR 411 in Longview
- East end: I-5 in Kelso

Location
- Country: United States
- State: Washington
- Counties: Cowlitz

Highway system
- State highways in Washington; Interstate; US; State; Scenic; Pre-1964; 1964 renumbering; Former
← SR 411	→ SR 433

State Route 432 (SR 432) is a 10.32-mile-long (16.61 km) state highway in the U.S. state of Washington, serving the cities of Longview and Kelso in Cowlitz County. The highway travels east along the Columbia River from an intersection with SR 4 in West Longview through the Port of Longview and the termini of SR 433 and SR 411 in Longview. SR 432 crosses the Cowlitz River on a divided highway and ends at an interchange with Interstate 5 (I-5) in Kelso. SR 432 was established during the 1964 highway renumbering as SR 832, replacing a branch of Primary State Highway 12 (PSH 12) that had been routed through Longview and Kelso since 1937. SR 432 was established in 1968 and originally routed on Nichols Boulevard within Longview and was re-aligned onto its current route in 1991 after the opening of Industrial Way.

== Route description ==
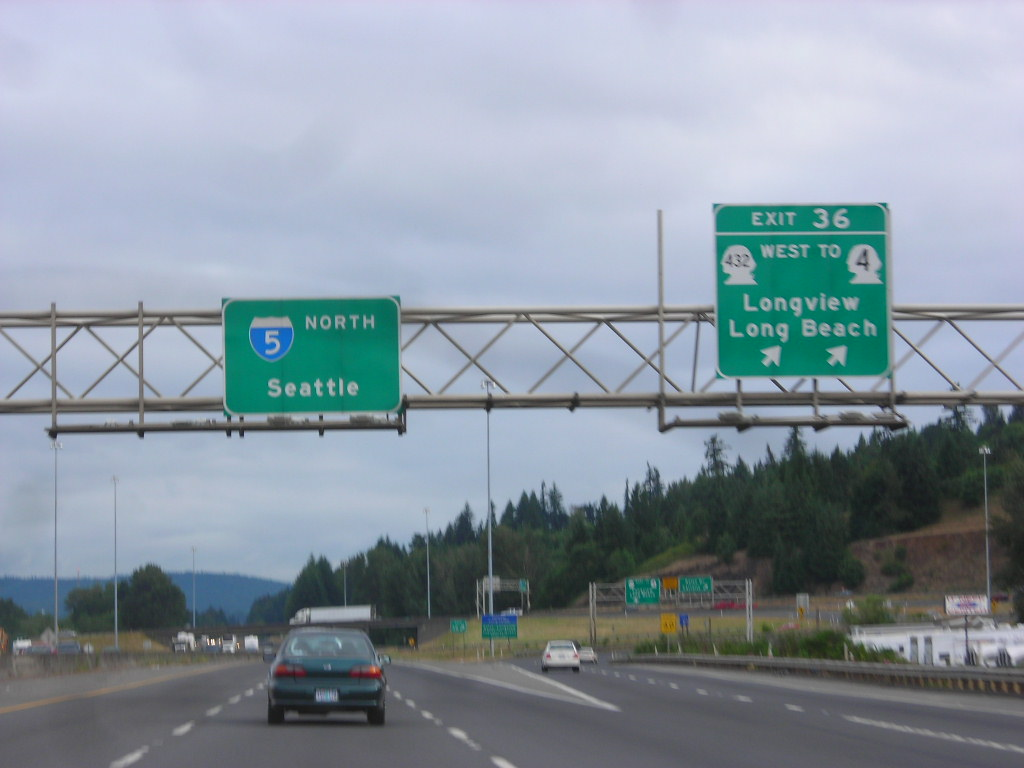
I-5 northbound at the Longview Wye in Kelso, the eastern terminus of SR 432

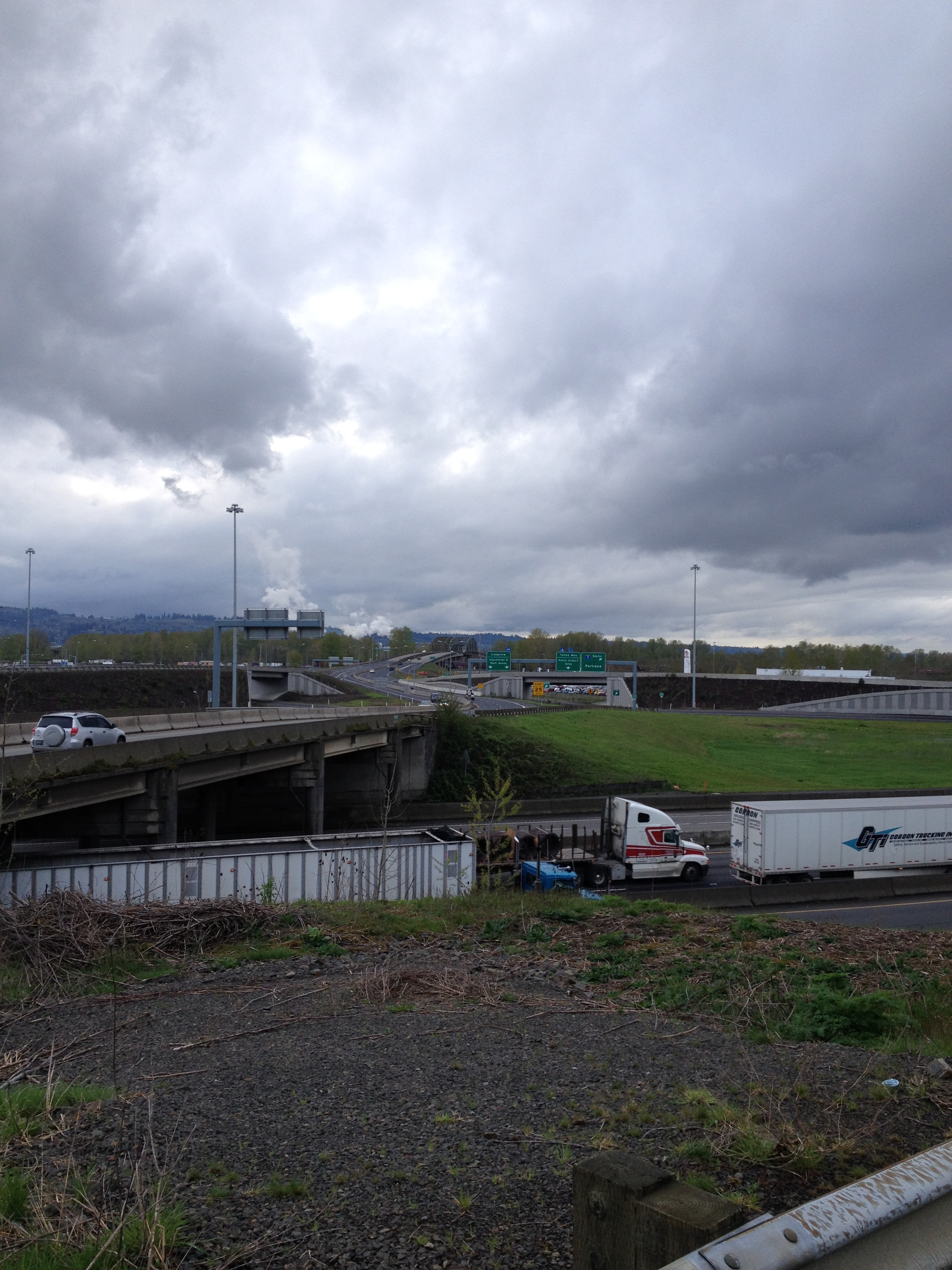
Longview Wye Interchange

SR 432 begins at an intersection with the Ocean Beach Highway, signed as SR 4, in West Longview in Cowlitz County. The two-lane highway travels southeast as Willow Grove Connection Road and Industrial Way around Mount Solo and into the city of Longview. The four-lane SR 432 parallel to a Columbia and Cowlitz Railway line and the Columbia River through the Port of Longview and intersects the northern terminus of SR 433, which travels on Oregon Way and the Lewis and Clark Bridge to Rainier, Oregon. The highway turns northeast onto 3rd Avenue and crosses a BNSF rail line before it intersects the Tennant Way divided highway and the southern terminus of SR 411 in a partial cloverleaf interchange. The SR 432 designation travels onto four-lane Tennant Way grade-separated highway and continues southeast, parallel to a BNSF rail yard, before intersecting Dike Road in a partial cloverleaf interchange and crossing over the Cowlitz River into Kelso. The highway travels south of Southwest Washington Regional Airport and intersects Talley Way in a partial cloverleaf interchange before intersecting I-5. The partial cloverleaf interchange, nicknamed the Longview Wye, serves as the eastern terminus of SR 432 while the roadway continues south as the Old Pacific Highway.

Every year, the Washington State Department of Transportation (WSDOT) conducts a series of surveys on its highways in the state to measure traffic volume. This is expressed in terms of annual average daily traffic (AADT), which is a measure of traffic volume for any average day of the year. In 2011, WSDOT calculated that the busiest section of SR 432 is the bridge over the Cowlitz River, serving 30,000 vehicles, while the least busy section is the western terminus at SR 4 in West Longview, serving 3,500 vehicles. The entire route of SR 432 is designated as an Intermodal Connector within the National Highway System, a highway system that includes roadways important to the national economy, defense, and mobility; and as a Highway of Statewide Significance by WSDOT, which includes highways that connect major communities in the state of Washington. SR 432 forms part of the Seattle to Portland Bicycle Classic, serving as the link between Longview and the Lewis and Clark Bridge via 3rd Avenue on the 202-mile-long (325 km) bicycle race held annually.

== History ==
Shields of former PSH 12 and WA 832

SR 432 has been part of the Washington state highway system since 1937, when it was designated as a branch of PSH 12. The Longview–Kelso branch of PSH 12 traveled 5.47 miles (8.80 km) east from an intersection with the Ocean Beach Highway, signed as PSH 12 and U.S. Route 830 (US 830), onto Nichols Boulevard around Lake Sacajawea and Tennant Way in Longview and crossed the Cowlitz River to Kelso, where the highway ended at an intersection with the Pacific Highway, signed as PSH 1 and US 99. In 1952, the highway was proposed as U.S. Route 830 Alternate shortly after the completion of the Longview Wye on US 99 (now I-5).

The Longview–Kelso branch of PSH 12 was replaced by SR 832 during the 1964 highway renumbering and existed until US 830 was decommissioned in 1967, as SR 432 was established as an auxiliary route of SR 4 before the highway system was codified in 1970. SR 432 was re-aligned onto its present route, Industrial Way, in 1991 to end at SR 4 in West Longview and to serve the Port of Longview. The realignment took effect on April 1, 1992. The eastern terminus of SR 432, an interchange with I-5 nicknamed the Longview Wye, was reconstructed by WSDOT beginning in December 2009. WSDOT removed the northwest loop ramp, which connected Old Pacific Highway to southbound I-5, and replaced it with an improved interchange with Talley Way that opened on October 28, 2011.

== Major intersections ==
The entire highway is in Cowlitz County.

Location	mi	km	Destinations	Notes
West Longview	0.00	0.00	SR 4 (Ocean Beach Highway) – Long Beach, Longview	Western terminus
Longview	6.10	9.82	SR 433 south to Oregon Way / US 30 – Port of Longview, Oregon	Northern terminus of SR 433
Longview	7.47– 8.16	12.02– 13.13	SR 411 north (3rd Avenue) – Kelso	Southern terminus of SR 411, interchange
Longview			West end of freeway	
Longview	9.08– 9.65	14.61– 15.53	Dike Road	
Kelso	9.75– 9.88	15.69– 15.90	Talley Way – Kelso Industrial Area	
Kelso	9.92– 10.32	15.96– 16.61	I-5 – Seattle, Portland	Eastern terminus, interchange, continues as Old Pacific Highway
1.000 mi = 1.609 km; 1.000 km = 0.621 mi
