= Washington State Route 4 =

State highway in southwestern Washington, US

State Route 4
- Ocean Beach Highway
- SR 4 highlighted in red

Route information
- Maintained by WSDOT
- Length: 62.27 mi (100.21 km)
- Existed: 1968–present
- Tourist routes: Lewis and Clark Trail

Major junctions
- West end: US 101 in Johnston's Landing
- SR 401 in Naselle; SR 409 in Cathlamet; SR 411 in Longview
- East end: I-5 in Kelso

Location
- Country: United States
- State: Washington
- Counties: Pacific, Wahkiakum, Cowlitz

Highway system
- State highways in Washington; Interstate; US; State; Scenic; Pre-1964; 1964 renumbering; Former
← SR 3	→ I-5

State Route 4 (SR 4) is a 62.27-mile-long (100.21 km) state highway, serving the southwestern region of the U.S. state of Washington. The highway, also known as Ocean Beach Highway, travels east along the Columbia River from U.S. Route 101 (US 101) at Johnston's Landing through Pacific, Wahkiakum and Cowlitz counties to an interchange with Interstate 5 (I-5) in Kelso. SR 4 is designated as part of the Lewis and Clark Trail Scenic Byway, a state scenic byway, as well as part of the National Highway System.

The highway, along with I-5 and SR 14, forms the former route of US 830, which ran along the Columbia River from Johnston's Landing to Maryhill from the creation of the United States Numbered Highways in 1926 until 1968. US 830 was co-signed with Primary State Highway 12 (PSH 12) from Johnston's Landing to Kelso and was created in 1937 as the successor to various unsigned state highways.

== Route description ==
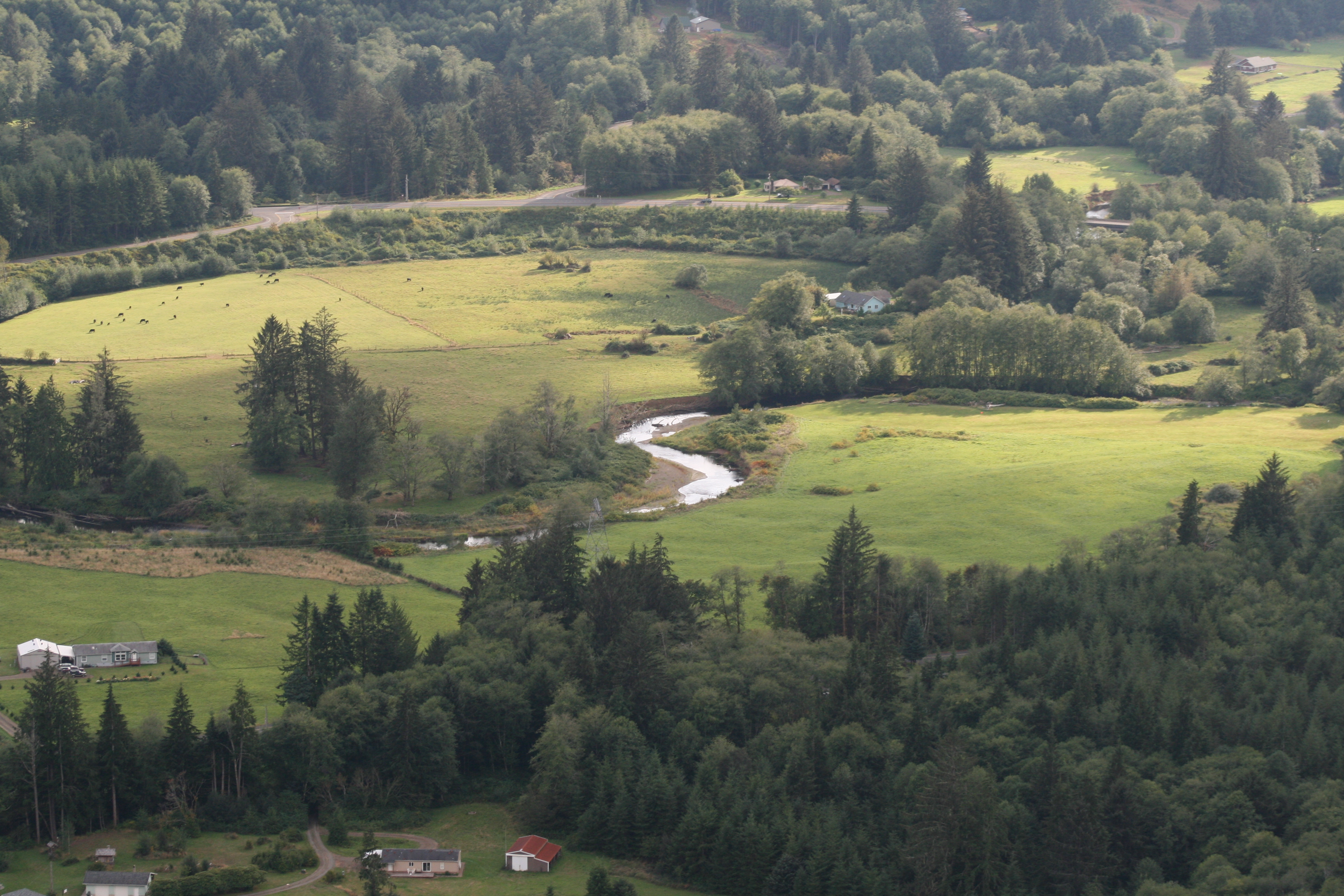
SR 4 traveling east along the Naselle River near the community of Naselle

SR 4 begins at an intersection with US 101 at Johnston's Landing, located on the Naselle River in rural Pacific County. The highway, designated as the Lewis and Clark Trail Scenic Byway, travels southeast along the Naselle River and serves as the northern terminus of SR 401 in the census-designated place of Naselle before leaving the Naselle River. SR 4 continues east along Salmon Creek and the Deep River into Wahkiakum County before it intersects the former route of SR 403 in Rosburg. The highway travels upstream along the Grays River and turns southeast towards Skamokawa, passing east of the Julia Butler Hansen Refuge for the Columbian White-Tailed Deer on the shores of the Columbia River. SR 4 continues east through the county seat of Cathlamet and intersects the former terminus of SR 407 and the northern terminus of SR 409. The highway travels into Cowlitz County and intersects the western terminus of SR 432, which serves the Port of Longview, in West Longview. SR 4 continues through the northern part of Longview and passes the campus of the Lower Columbia College before traveling onto Cowlitz Way. Cowlitz Way intersects the former spur route of SR 411 and crosses over SR 411 and the Cowlitz River into Kelso before SR 4 splits into a one-way pair traveling south through downtown Kelso. SR 4 turns east onto Allen Street and continues to its eastern terminus, a diamond interchange with I-5 north of the Three Rivers Mall.

Every year, the Washington State Department of Transportation (WSDOT) conducts a series of surveys on its highways in the state to measure traffic volume. This is expressed in terms of annual average daily traffic (AADT), which is a measure of traffic volume for any average day of the year. In 2011, WSDOT calculated that the busiest section of SR 4 was the intersection with Catlin Street in Kelso west of the Cowlitz Way Bridge, serving 34,000 vehicles daily, while the least busy section was between Rosburg and Cathlamet in rural Wahkiakum County, serving less than 1,000 vehicles per day. The entire route of SR 4 is designated as part of the National Highway System, a highway system that includes roadways important to the national economy, defense, and mobility; and as a Highway of Statewide Significance by WSDOT from US 101 at Johnston's Landing to SR 432 in West Longview, which includes highways that connect major communities in the state of Washington.

== History ==
Shields of former US 830 and PSH 12

The present route of SR 4 was codified into the state highway system in 1915 as State Road 19, connecting Naselle, Cathlamet, Longview, and Kelso along the Columbia River. The highway was built by Pacific County in the Naselle area and Cowlitz County between Stella and Kelso, while the Department of Highways built a road connecting Cathlamet to Skamokawa by 1915. State Road 19 was officially designated as the Ocean Beach Highway in 1919 and renumbered to State Road 12 in 1923. The highway was incorporated into US 830 during the creation of the United States Numbered Highways in 1926, traveling east along the Columbia River from US 101 at Johnston's Landing to US 97 in Maryhill. The highway was paved with the macadam method between Johnston's Landing and Grays River and between Skamokawa and Kelso by 1931. The remaining gap was constructed of gravel by 1933 and the entire highway was paved by 1939. State Road 12 was replaced by PSH 12 in 1937, traveling west from PSH 1 and US 99 in Chehalis to PSH 13 in Raymond, south on US 101 to Johnston's Landing, and east on US 830 to PSH 1 and US 99 in Kelso. During the 1964 highway renumbering, US 830 replaced PSH 12 between Johnston's Landing and Kelso and was designated as part of the Lewis and Clark Trail Scenic Byway during the creation of the state scenic highway system in 1967. US 830 was decommissioned in 1968 and was replaced with SR 4; however, the highway was proposed as a route for US 12 before it was extended west via White Pass to Aberdeen.

== Major intersections ==
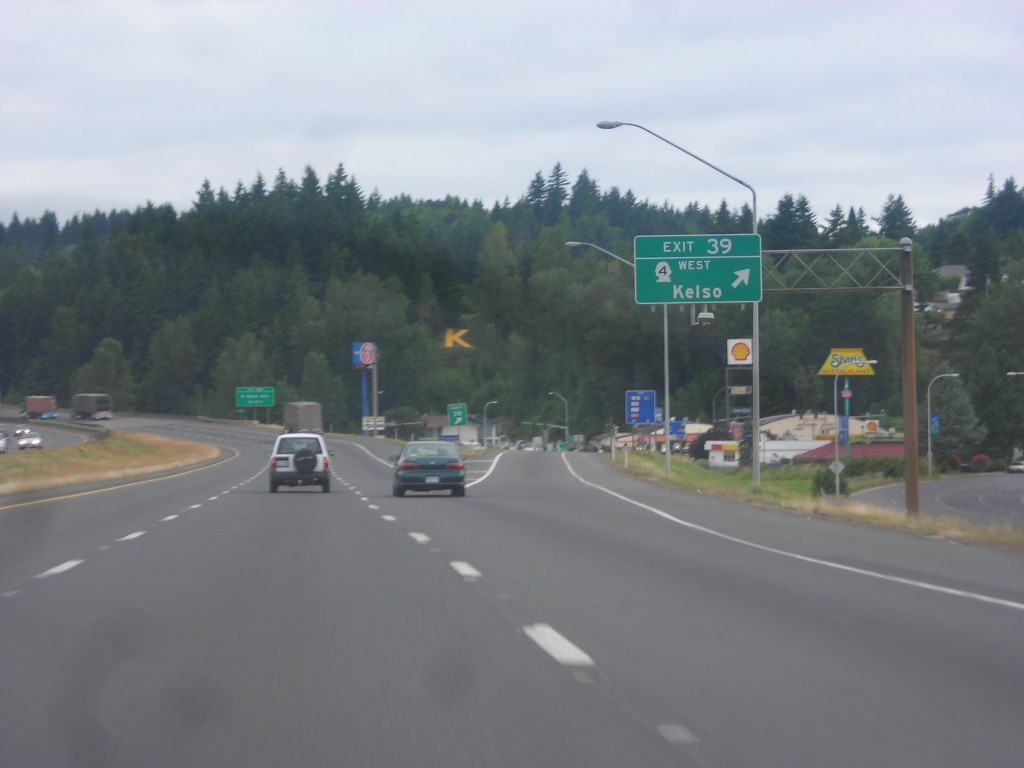
I-5 northbound at its interchange with SR 4 in Kelso

County	Location	mi	km	Destinations	Notes
Pacific	Johnston's Landing	0.00	0.00	US 101 – Long Beach, Ilwaco, Raymond, Aberdeen	Western terminus
Pacific	Naselle	4.75	7.64	SR 401 south / Lewis and Clark Trail – Astoria, Ilwaco	Northern terminus of SR 401
Wahkiakum	Rosburg	15.05	24.22	Altoona–Pillar Rock Road – Altoona	Former SR 403
Wahkiakum		34.86	56.10	Elochoman Valley Road	Former SR 407
Wahkiakum	Cathlamet	35.52	57.16	SR 409 south to US 30 – Cathlamet	Northern terminus of SR 409
Cowlitz	West Longview	55.23	88.88	SR 432 east (Willow Grove Road) – Industrial Area	Western terminus of SR 432
Cowlitz	Kelso	60.98	98.14	5th Avenue	Former SR 411 Spur
Cowlitz	Kelso	61.43	98.86	Pacific Avenue	Former SR 431
Cowlitz	Kelso	62.22– 62.27	100.13– 100.21	I-5 / Lewis and Clark Trail – Seattle, Portland	Eastern terminus, interchange
1.000 mi = 1.609 km; 1.000 km = 0.621 mi
