= Washington State Route 433 =

State highway in Cowlitz County, Washington, US

State Route 433
- Oregon Way
- SR 433 highlighted in red

Route information
- Maintained by WSDOT
- Length: 0.94 mi (1,510 m)
- Existed: 1964–present

Major junctions
- South end: To US 30 in Rainier, OR
- North end: SR 432 in Longview

Location
- Country: United States
- State: Washington
- Counties: Cowlitz

Highway system
- State highways in Washington; Interstate; US; State; Scenic; Pre-1964; 1964 renumbering; Former
← SR 432	→ SR 500

State Route 433 (SR 433) is a 0.94-mile (1.51 km) long state highway located entirely in Cowlitz County, Washington, United States. The highway begins midway across the Columbia River on the National Register of Historic Places listed Lewis and Clark Bridge and travels north to SR 432 in Longview. Prior to the 1964 state highway renumbering the highway was part of Primary State Highway 12. Between 1964 and 1972, the highway's designation was changed from State Route 833 to the current SR 433.

== Route description ==
SR 433 enters Washington and Cowlitz county on the National Register of Historic Places listed Lewis and Clark Bridge over the Columbia River. The highway travels northeast along the bridge for 0.54 mi (0.87 km) before dropping into the city and Port of Longview, intersecting the access road to the Port, Port Way. The highway continues north, paralleling railroad tracks belonging to the Columbia and Cowlitz Railway, intersecting Port Way again, and gaining one lane in each direction for a total of four lanes before the highway terminates at an intersection with SR 432 and Industrial Way. The highway has a posted speed limit of 35 miles per hour (56 km/h) for its entire length. Oregon Way continues after the end of SR 433 into downtown Longview and SR 4.

Every year the Washington State Department of Transportation (WSDOT) conducts a series of surveys on its highways in the state to measure traffic volume. This is expressed in terms of annual average daily traffic (AADT), which is a measure of traffic volume for any average day of the year. In 2009, WSDOT calculated 20,000 vehicles use the highway, with 12 percent of that traffic being trucks. The entire highway is listed on both the WSDOT List of Highways of Statewide Significance, which marks this portion of the highway as critical to connecting major communities in the state, and the National Highway System, a system of roads that are important to the nation's economy, defense and mobility.

SR 433 and the Lewis and Clark Bridge form part of the Seattle to Portland Bicycle Classic, serving as the link between Washington and Oregon on the 202 mi (325 km) long bicycle race held annually.

== History ==
Before the 1964 state highway renumbering the highway was part of Primary State Highway 12. Sometime between the renumbering and 1972 the highway was renumbered from SR 833, a branch of U.S. Route 830 (US 830), to the current SR 433, a branch of SR 4, which replaced US 830 through the area. SR 433 originally terminated at Tennant Way, but was truncated to Industrial Way in 1991 as part of the relocation of SR 432.

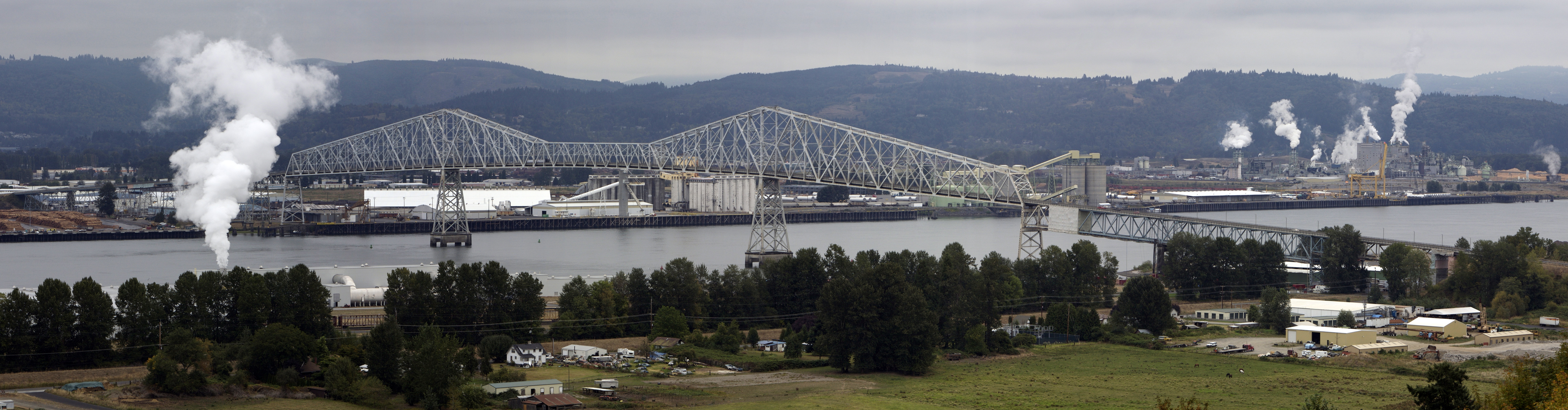
The Lewis and Clark Bridge shot looking northeast. SR 433 begins in the middle of the bridge and travels towards the left.

== Major intersections ==
Shields of former PSH 12 and WA 833

The entire highway is in Cowlitz County.

Location	mi	km	Destinations	Notes
Columbia River	0.00– 0.54	0.00– 0.87	Lewis and Clark Bridge; Washington–Oregon state line	
Longview	0.94	1.51	SR 432 (Industrial Way)	To I-5 via SR 432
1.000 mi = 1.609 km; 1.000 km = 0.621 mi
