= Washington State Route 403 =

State highway in Wahkiakum County, Washington, US

State Route 403
- Altoona–Pillar Rock Road
- SR 403 highlighted in red

Route information
- Auxiliary route of SR 4
- Maintained by WSDOT
- Length: 10.4 mi (16.7 km)
- Existed: 1964–1991

Major junctions
- South end: Pillar Rock
- North end: SR 4 in Rosburg

Location
- Country: United States
- State: Washington
- Counties: Wahkiakum

Highway system
- State highways in Washington; Interstate; US; State; Scenic; Pre-1964; 1964 renumbering; Former
← SR 402	→ I-405

State Route 403 (SR 403, now known as the Altoona–Pillar Rock Road) was a state highway in Wahkiakum County, in the U.S. state of Washington. It extended 10.4 miles (16.7 km) from Pillar Rock northwest to SR 4 in Rosburg. The route served as a connector to Pillar Rock. The highway was Secondary State Highway 12C (SSH 12C) from 1943 until 1964, which ran from Pillar Rock to Rosburg. In 1991, SR 403 was removed from the state highway system.

== Route description ==
SR 403 ran 10.4 miles (16.7 km) from Pillar Rock northwest to SR 4 in Rosburg. The route served as a connector to Pillar Rock. The road started at Pillar Rock, a natural rock formation along the Columbia River. SR 403 went west and passed the communities of Brookefield and Altoona while paralleling the Columbia River's shoreline. The highway then went northwest and then curved westward before reverting to a more northern route to Rosburg. In Rosburg, SR 403 ended at an intersection with SR 4.

== History ==
The shield of SSH 12C.

When the Primary and Secondary Highways were formed in 1937, the former route of SR 403 became Secondary State Highway 12C (SSH 12C). SSH 12C became SR 403 in 1964 during the 1964 highway renumbering, in which the Washington State Department of Transportation (WSDOT) replaced the previous system of Primary and Secondary Highways with a new system called State Routes, which is still in use today. In 1991, the Washington State Legislature approved a law that removed the highway from the state route system. The decommissioning took effect on April 1, 1992, with the state government continuing to maintain the Grays River bridge.

== Major intersections ==
The entire highway is in Wahkiakum County.

Location	mi	km	Destinations	Notes
Pillar Rock	0.0	0.0	Pillar Rock	
Rosburg	10.4	16.7	SR 4 (Ocean Beach Highway) – Naselle, Cathlamet, Longview	
1.000 mi = 1.609 km; 1.000 km = 0.621 mi
