= Grays River =

Grays River may refer to:

- Grays River (Washington), a tributary of the lower Columbia River
- Grays River, Washington, a census-designated place in Wahkiakum County, Washington
- Grays River, New Zealand, a river in New Zealand
