= Rosburg =

Rosburg could refer to:

- Bob Rosburg (1926–2009), American golfer
- Jerry Rosburg (born 1955), American football coach
- Rosburg, Washington, United States, a census-designated place
