= Grays River Covered Bridge =

Historic covered bridge in Washington state

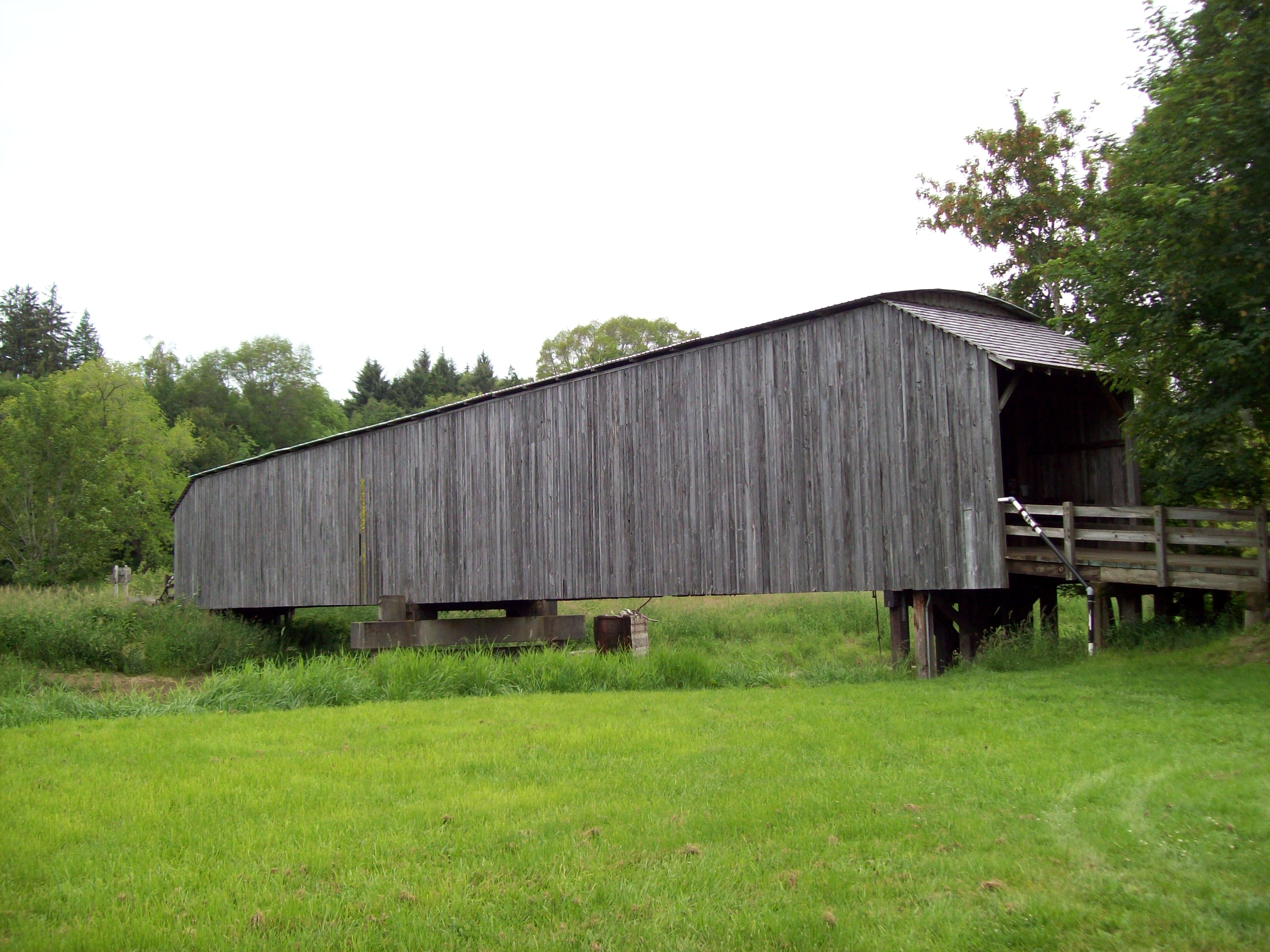
- Coordinates: 46°21′17.60″N 123°34′52.12″W
- Carries: Covered Bridge Road
- Crosses: Grays River
- Locale: Grays River, Washington
- Heritage status: NRHP

Characteristics
- Design: Howe truss
- Material: Timber
- Total length: 155.5 feet (47.4 m)
- Width: 14 feet (4.3 m)
- Height: 22.5 feet (6.9 m)
- Clearance above: 16.75 feet (5.11 m)

History
- Construction end: 1905
- Grays River Covered Bridge
- U.S. National Register of Historic Places
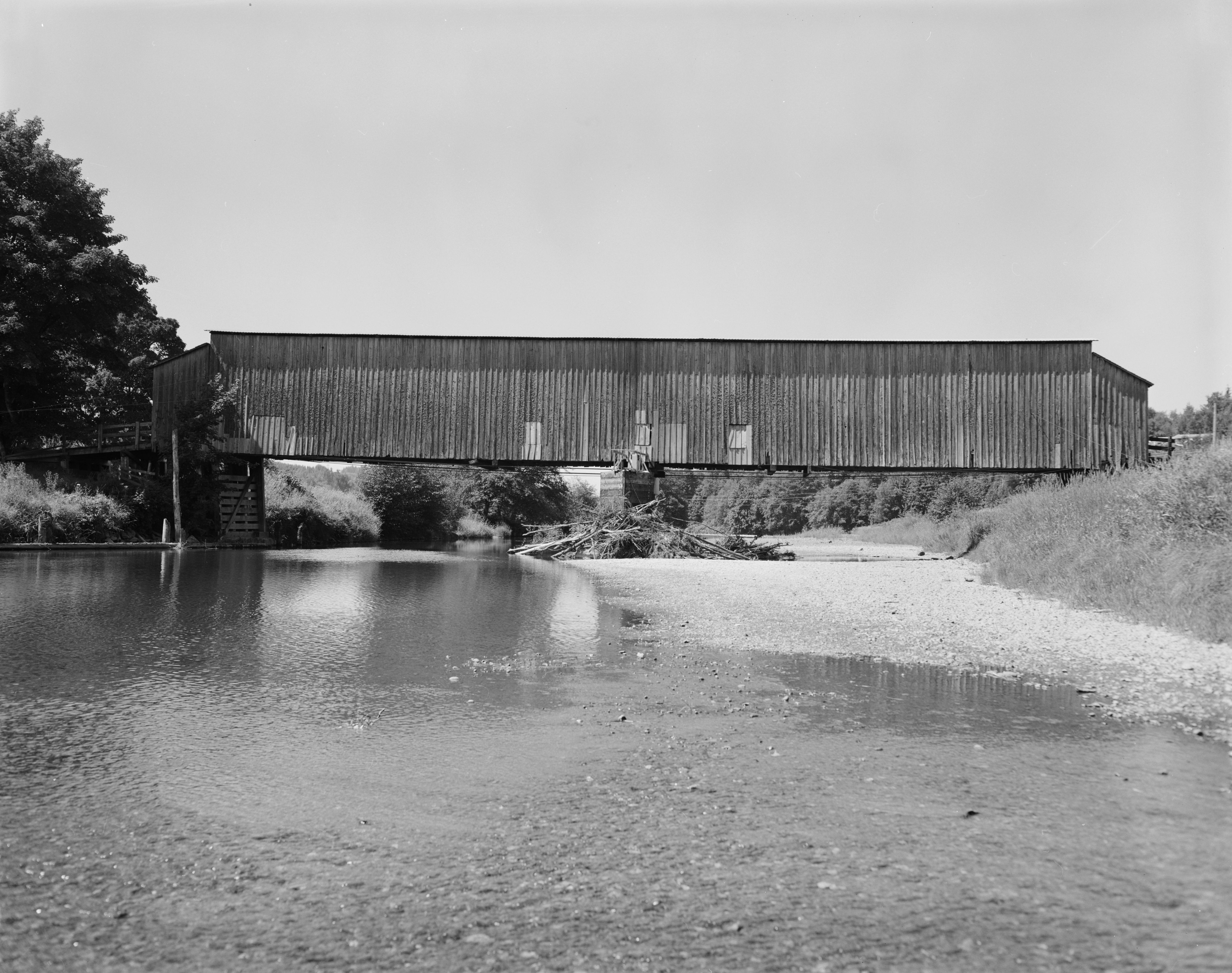
- The Grays River Covered Bridge in 1988
- MPS: Historic Bridges/Tunnels in Washington State TR (AD)
- NRHP reference No.: 71000880
- Added to NRHP: November 23, 1971

Location
- Interactive map of Grays River Covered Bridge

The Grays River Covered Bridge is a one-lane covered bridge over the Grays River in western Wahkiakum County, Washington. It is the only covered bridge still in use as a public highway in Washington State. The bridge was added to the National Register of Historic Places in 1971.

== History ==
The bridge was built in 1905 in order to allow horse and wagon agricultural traffic to cross the river. Hans P. Ahlberg, whose dairy farm spanned both sides of the river, was instrumental in getting county commissioners to authorize the project, which was built on his property by the Ferguson & Huston company of Astoria, Oregon. The bridge was covered three years later in 1908 to preserve the expensive wooden trusses from the ravages of the area rains. The roof of the covered bridge was originally built of "board and batten cedar siding with a capped tin roof."

The bridge received a major restoration and reconstruction in 1988. In disrepair and at risk of being torn down, residents worked to raise funds for restoration. Reconstruction was completed by Dulin Construction of Centralia, Washington, for a cost of $295,980.00. The new bridge included steel beams some of which received a wood veneer to maintain the bridge's historic appearance. On September 30, 1989, the bridge was rededicated to public use, with author, granger, and Grays River resident Robert Michael Pyle serving as master of ceremonies.

== Engineering ==
The Howe truss timber bridge with timber decking spans 155.5 feet (47.4 m), is 22.5 feet (6.9 m) high with 16.75 feet (5.11 m) inside clearance, and is 14 feet (4.3 m) wide. Cedar shingles cover the exterior.

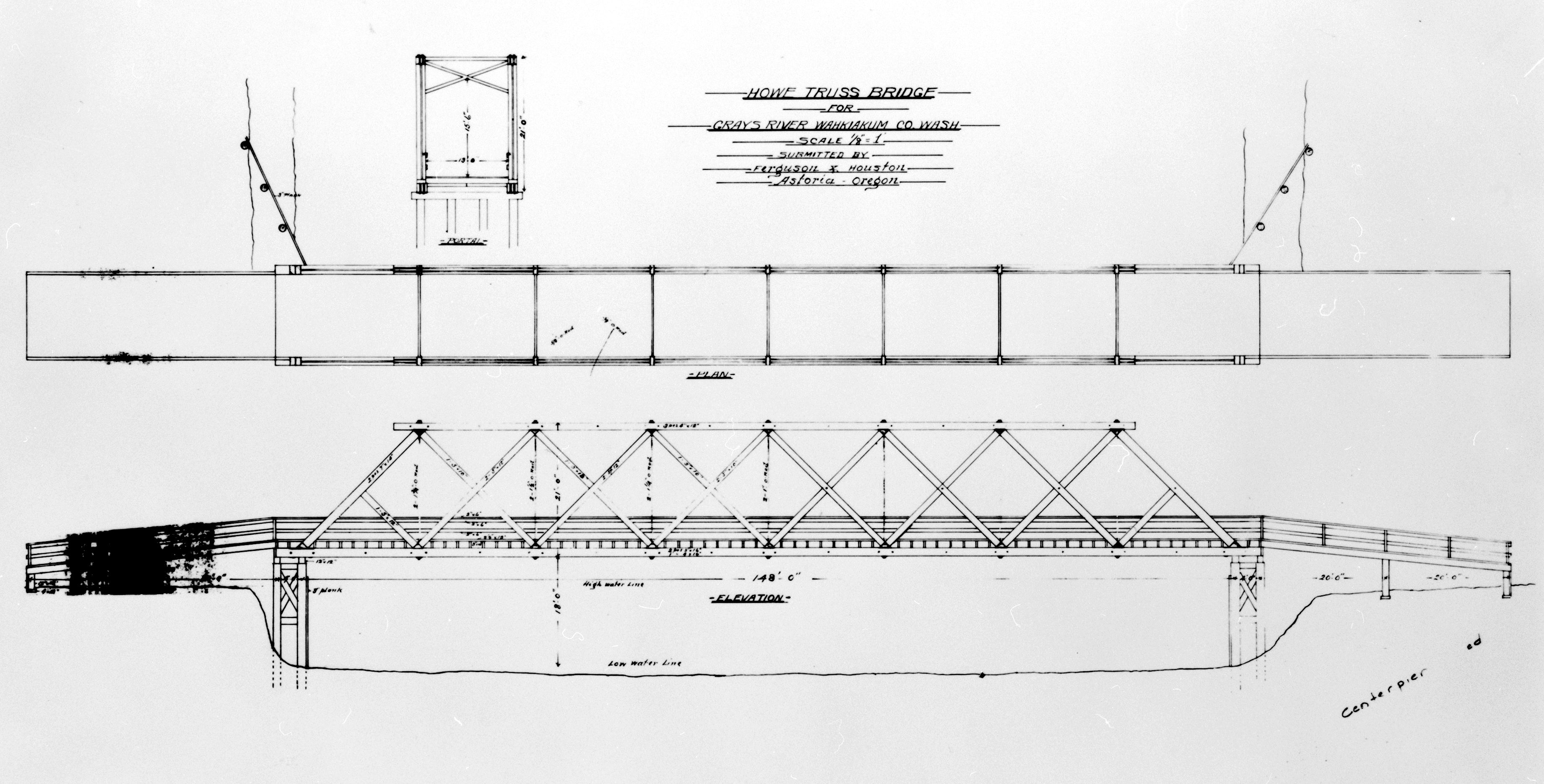
1905 bridge plans drawn up by Ferguson & Houston of Astoria, Oregon

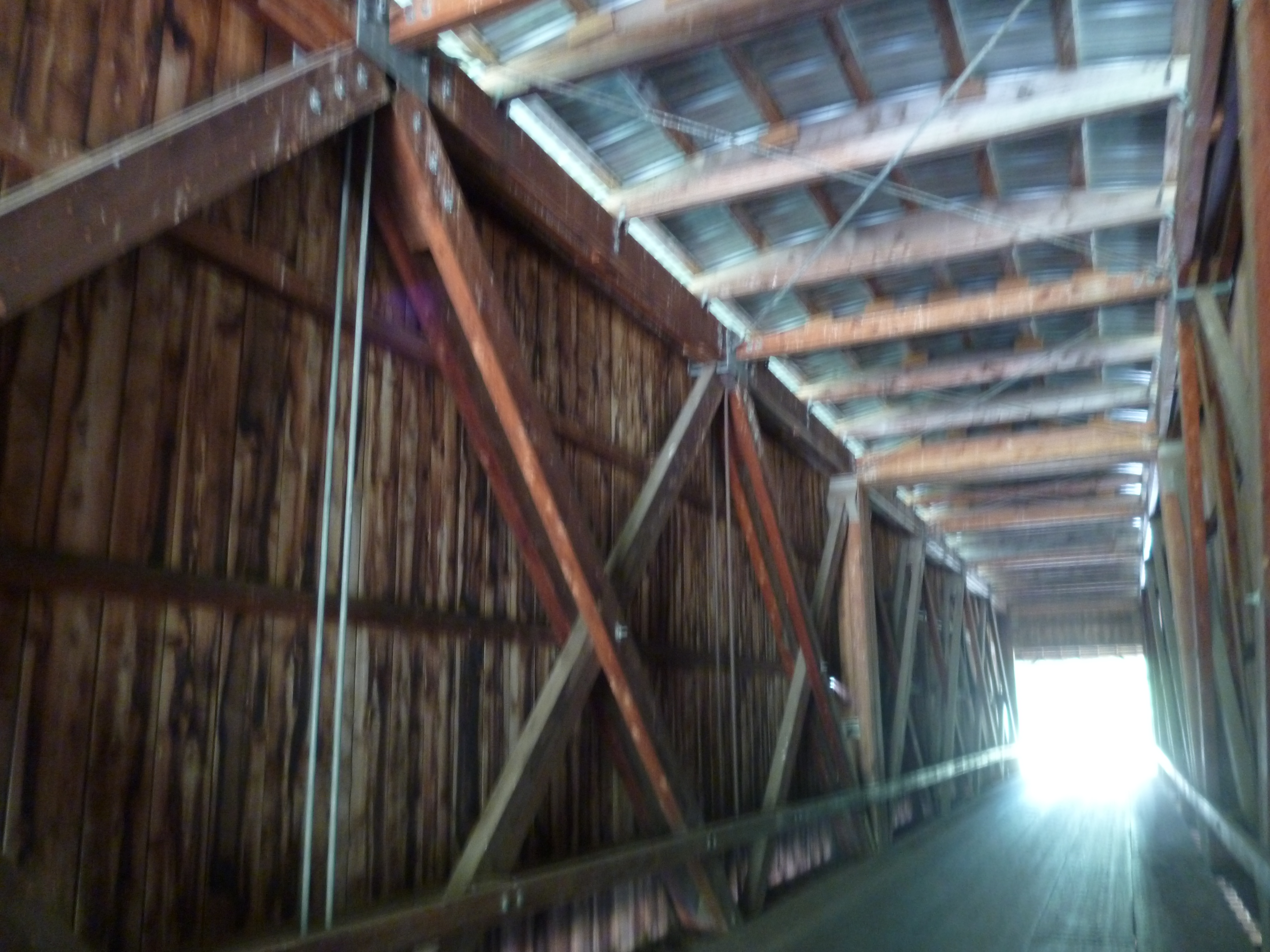
Inside the Grays River Covered Bridge showing the Howe truss

== Management ==
The bridge is the centerpiece of Ahlberg Park, which has been managed by the Grays River Grange since 2011 and is the site of an annual Covered Bridge Festival.

== See also ==
- List of bridges documented by the Historic American Engineering Record in Washington (state)
