= Skamokawa, Washington =

Unincorporated community in Washington, United States

- Unincorporated community
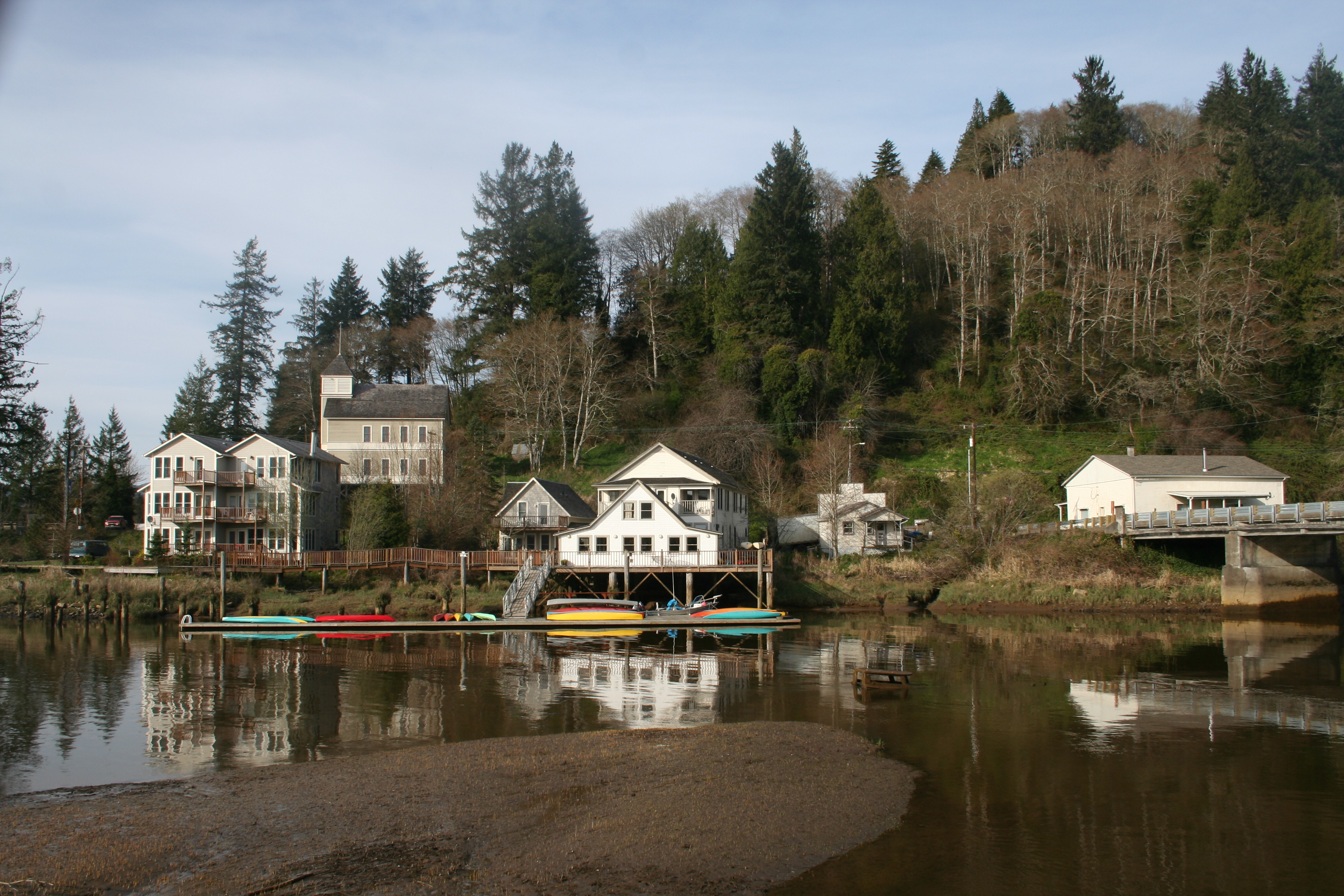

- Location within Washington (state)
- Coordinates: 46°17′15″N 123°27′19″W
- Country: United States
- State: Washington
- Counties: Wahkiakum County
- Elevation: 30 ft (9 m)

Population (2007)
  - Total: 449
- Time zone: UTC-8 (PST)
  - Summer (DST): UTC-7 (PDT)
- ZIP Codes: 98647
- Area code(s): 360, 564
- GNIS feature ID: 1508379

Skamokawa (/skʌˈmɑːkəˌweɪ/) is an unincorporated community in Wahkiakum County, Washington, United States. Skamokawa Valley, a census-designated place (CDP), lies directly to the north. Skamokawa is a Chinook term for smoke or fog on the water.

Skamokawa rests on the banks of the Columbia River, and on WA 4. The region's first American trading post was established near Skamokawa in 1844.

The town includes a post office, restaurant, and general store, along with a nearby historical museum and covered bridge. Originally focused on logging, is now a local center for kayaking and fishing.

== Gallery ==
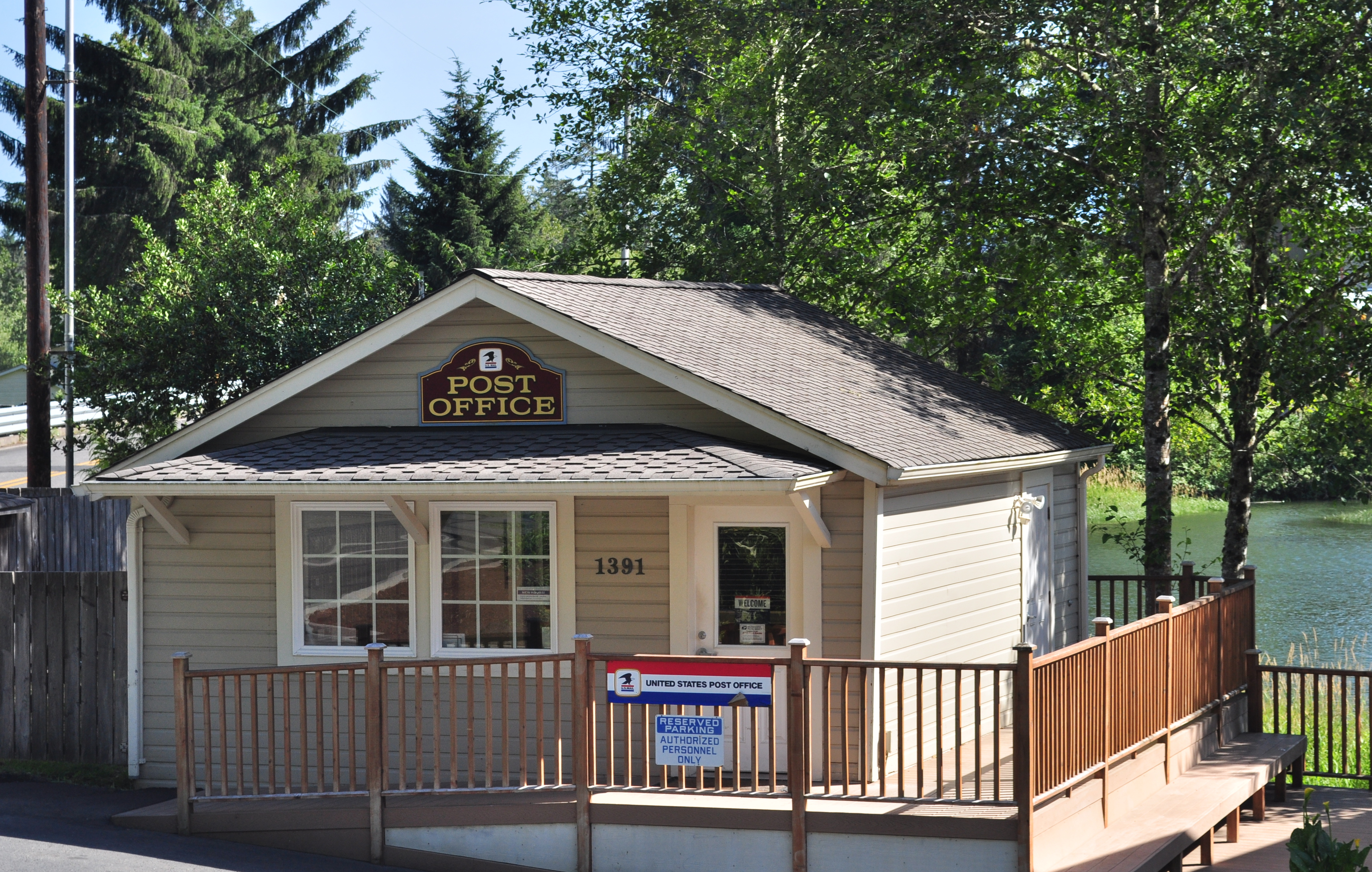
Post Office

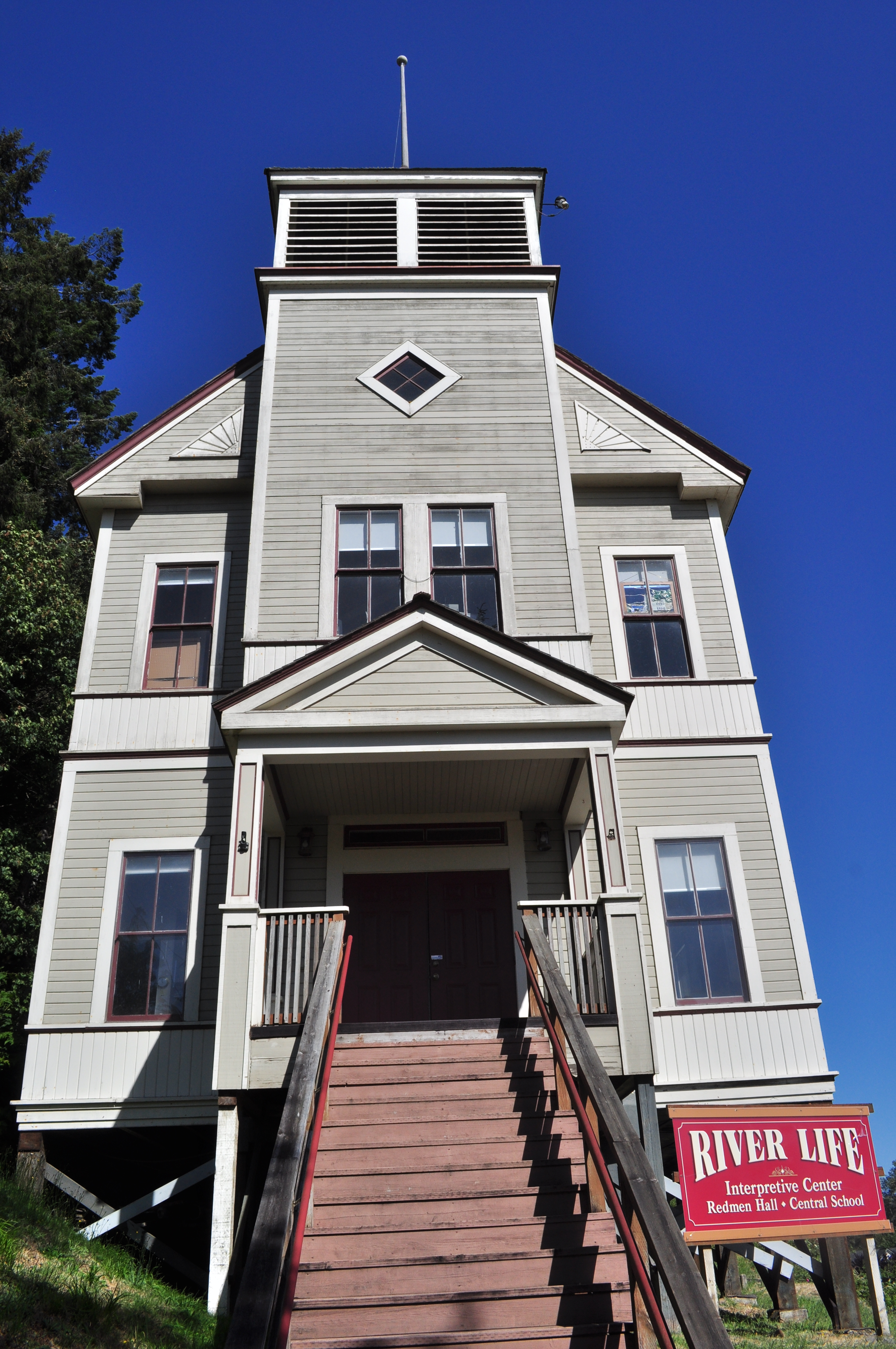
Red Men Hall

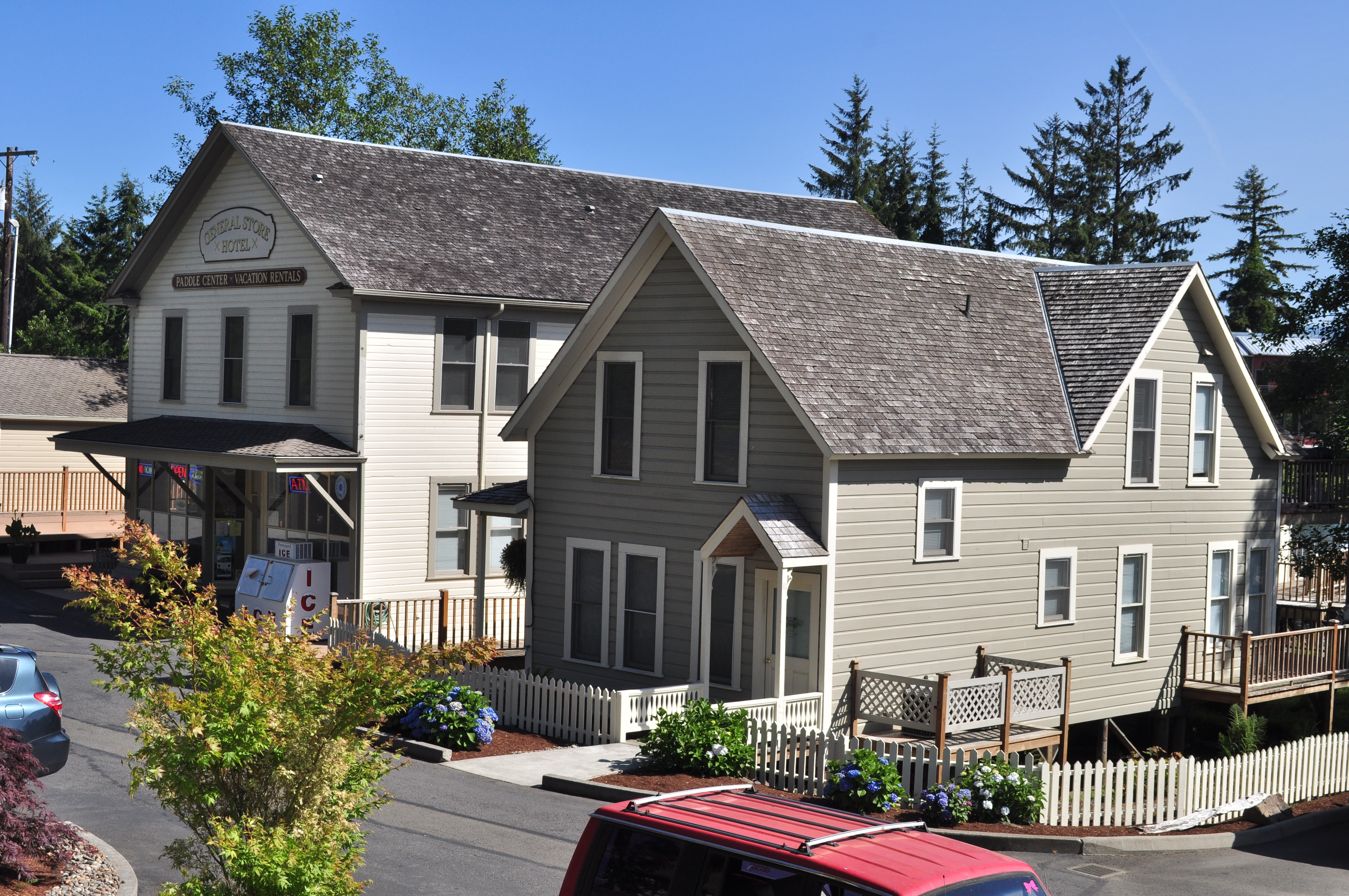
General Store

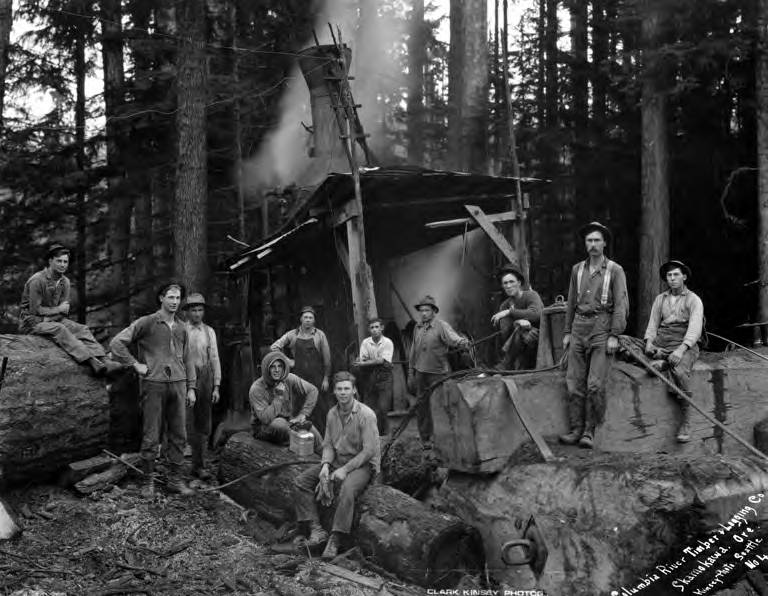
Donkey engine crew, c. 1918

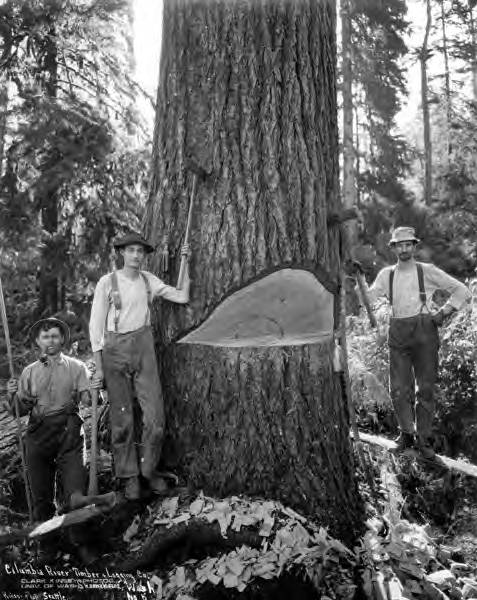
Felling men, c. 1918

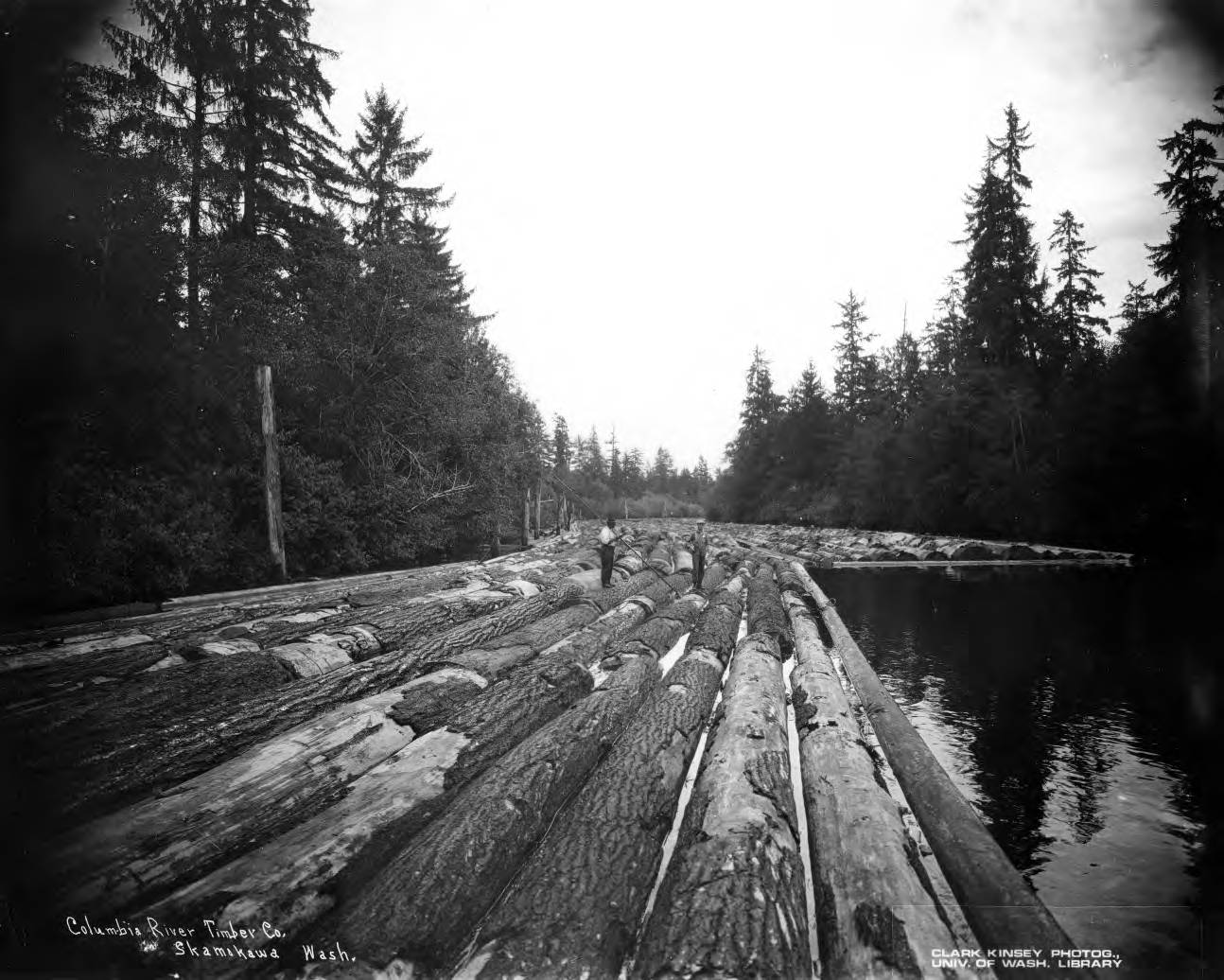
Rafting logs, c. 1918

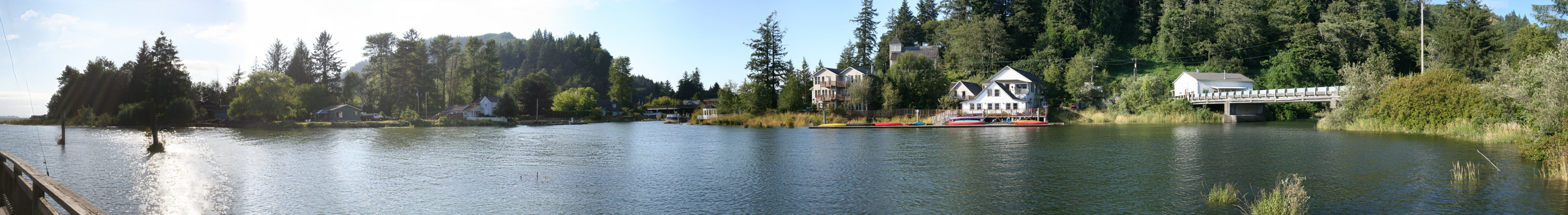
Looking over Steamboat Slough toward downtown Skamokawa and the Paddle Center.
