= Kitsap Color Classic =

Kitsap Color Classic, a Cascade Bicycle Club event, is an annual event held every Autumn on the Kitsap Peninsula of Washington State since its beginning in 1991. Bicyclists board a Washington State Ferry in Edmonds, Washington, then ride to Kingston to start cycling. Distances range from 25 miles to 57 miles, with riders able to register for a distance of their choice. Ridership is typically in the hundreds, with many of riders taking the Edmonds-Kingston ferry to begin the ride. The ride is considered the finale of the area's bicycle event season, and is the final race of the year hosted by the Cascade Bicyle Club. The autumnal race's name refers to the changing color of deciduous trees' leaves and in 2020 was named one of the most beautiful bicycle rides in the United States by Bicycling.
