= Callendar Navigation Company =

Callender Navigation Company
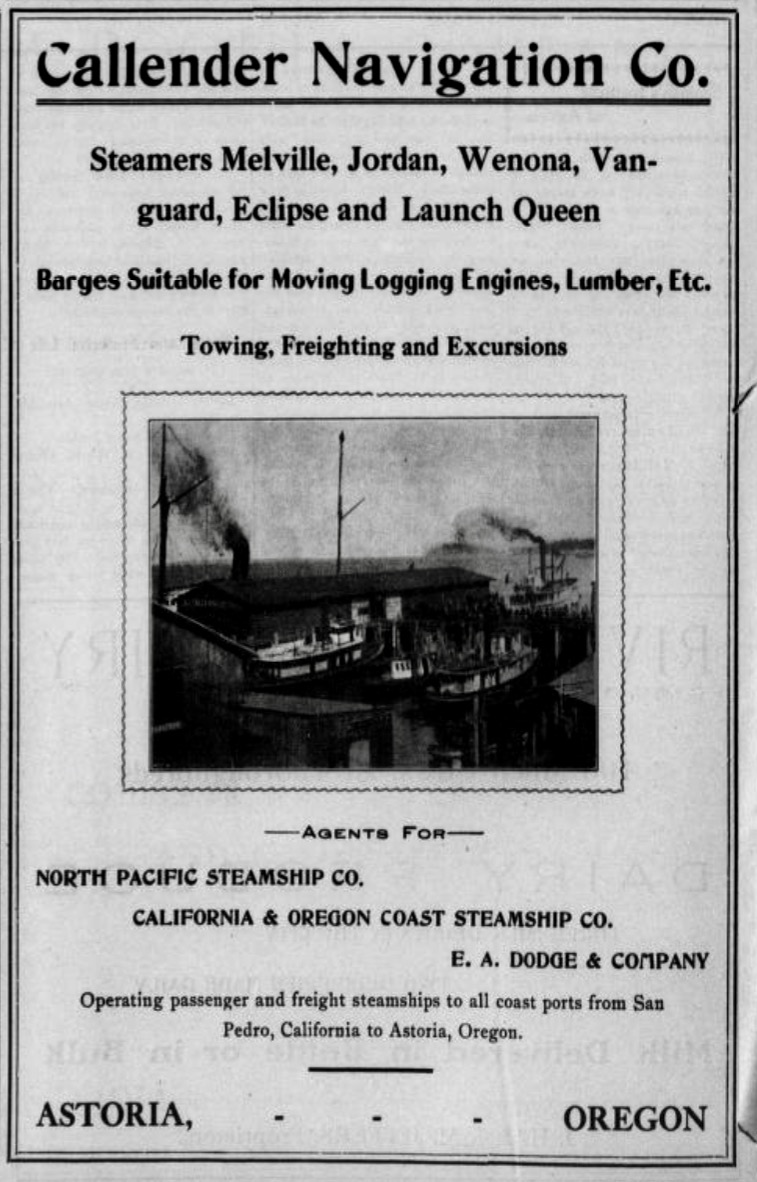
- Industry: Riverine transport
- Founded: circa 1900
- Fate: Merged 1922
- Successor: Knappton Towing Company
- Headquarters: Astoria, Oregon, US

The Callendar Navigation Company, sometimes seen as the Callendar Transportation Company, started in business in the early 1900s. Callendar was formed in the early 1900s, and was based in Astoria, Oregon. Callender was to become one of six large towing companies of the Columbia and Willamette rivers in the early decades of the 1900s, the others being Shaver Transportation, Smith Transportation, Hosford, Knappton Towing Co., and Willamette and Columbia River Towing Co. In 1922, Callendar Navigation merged with Knappton Towboat Co., which existed, with a name change in 1990, and which became part of Foss Marine in 1993.

== Personnel ==
The president of the company was M.E. Callender, the vice-president was Maxwell Ludwig "Max" Skibbe, and Charles H. Callendar was the secretary, treasurer, and general manager. In April 1903, Skibbe was the owner of the steamer Eclipse, and held a half interest in the steamer Vanguard and the gasoline launch Queen. That same month, Skibbe sold his interest in a shoreside concern, the Eclipse Hardware Company, to concentrate in the steamboat business.

== Fleet composition ==
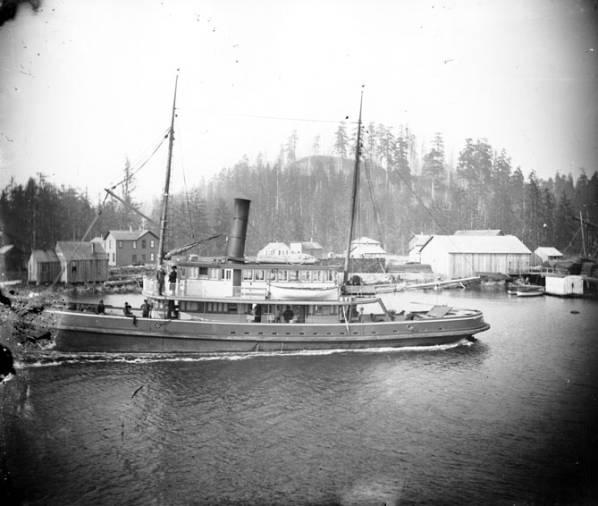
Steamer Cruiser in Aberdeen, Washington, circa 1900

Vessels are shown by (date of construction; date of acquisition by company - date of disposition).

- Cruiser (1886; 1905–1906). Purchased October 1905 and sold June 1906. 66 gross tons, 33 net tons, 70 ft (21.3 m) long, 16 ft (4.9 m) beam, 6.1 ft (1.9 m) depth of hold, crew of one, built in 1886 as a passenger vessel at North Bend, Oregon for Captain Asa Meade Simpson (1826–1915). The registry number was 126368. Registered as having a crew of 5. Cruiser was built with a compound steam engine, with a piston stroke of 12 inches and cylinder bore diameters of 9 inches (high pressure) and 16 inches (low pressure). For nearly all the time between construction and 1895, Cruiser was operated in Grays Harbor and Willapa Bay under captains J.C. Reed and Edward Gunderson (b. 1879).
- Eclipse (1889; 1902–1906), towing and jobbing vessel. Built at Portland in 1889 for Capt. Max Skibbe. Eclipse was reported to have been condemned by officers Fuller and Edward of the Steamboat Inspection Service in October 1906. The plan was to salvage the engines and send the hull to a steamboat graveyard. There was talk that Captain Skibbe, former master of Eclipse, might be reassigned to the tug Cruiser. Cruiser was then owned by the Simpson Lumber Company. The inspectors had refused to renew the steamer's certificate on account of the poor condition of the hull. Cruiser was purchased but quickly sold, in June 1906, to the Portland-Seattle Railway Co.
- Jordan (1901; 1901-unk.), passenger vessel, 91 gross tons, 60 net tons, 70.4 ft (21.5 m) long, 17.3 ft (5.3 m) beam, 6.2 ft (1.9 m) depth of hold, three crew, built in 1901 at Portland, Oregon, registry number 77501. Jordan was originally built as passenger vessel but was soon converted to a towboat.
- Melville (1903; 1903–1922), passenger vessel, 93 gross tons, 64 net tons, 79.5 ft (24.2 m) long, 19.7 ft (6.0 m) beam, 6.9 ft (2.1 m) depth of hold, three crew, built in 1903 at Knappton, Washington, registry number 93390. The Callendar company later operated Melville as a steam tug. The Knappton Towing Company acquired Melville through its merger with Callendar Navigation Co., and eventually converted the vessel to diesel power.
- North Star (1899; 1902–1903), steamer leased from December 1902 to April 1903. 121 gross tons, 82 net tons, 73 ft (22.3 m) long, 19 ft (5.8 m) beam, 8.2 ft (2.5 m) depth of hold, crew of one, built in 1899 as a towing vessel at Seattle, Washington, registry number 130814. Registered as having a crew of 12.
- Queen (1903; 1903–1909), gasoline launch, 14 gross tons, 10 net tons, 49.5 ft (15.1 m) long, 11.5 ft (3.5 m) beam, 3.6 ft (1.1 m) depth of hold, crew of one, built in 1903 at Astoria, Oregon, registry number 20640. In 1909 the Calendar company sold Queen to Captain Jack Reid (d.1929), a veteran Columbia River ferry operator, who placed the launch in service between Kalama, Washington and Goble, Oregon.
- Vanguard (1901; 1902-unk.), towing vessel, 75 gross tons, 51 net tons, 64.5 ft (19.7 m) long, 18.1 ft (5.5 m) beam, 4.8 ft (1.5 m) depth of hold, four crew, built in 1901 at Astoria, Oregon, registry number 161873. Vanguard had a long career in towing on the lower Columbia River, mostly for Calendar Navigation Co.
- Wenona (1904; 1904-unk.), passenger vessel, 74 gross tons, 51 net tons, 60.7 ft (18.5 m) long, 16.0 ft (4.9 m) beam, 4.8 ft (1.5 m) depth of hold, three crew, built in 1904 at North Bend, Oregon, registry number 201565.

== Operations ==
=== Lease of North Star ===
In December 1902, Callendar Transportation Co. leased the steamer North Star from Alaska Fisherman's Packing Co., to tow logs and conduct a general jobbing business at the mouth of the Columbia River. On April 1, 1903, the Callendar company returned North Star to Alaska Fisherman's Packing Co., who intended to fit out the vessel for service in Bristol Bay, Alaska for service as a cannery tender.

=== Acquisition of Melville ===
Melville was launched on March 31, 1903, at Knappton. The engine and boiler had not yet been installed, but were expected to arrive soon from the eastern United States. In January 1907, Melville was converted to an oil-burner in late 1906 or earlier 1907. One of the first tasks for Melville after the conversion to an oil burner was to tow a barge loaded with salvage equipment to assist in kedging off the stranded ship Alice McDonald. Captain Peter Jordan (1858–1916) was in charge of Melville at the time.

=== Dock construction ===
In 1904, the company hired L. Lebak to construct a dock in Astoria. In December 1904, Lebak finished driving the 400 pilings necessary for the dock, with the next phase of the construction being to install the planking and build the warehouse on the dock.

The company had a dock at the Astoria waterfront which was 250 long and 65 feet wide. Capt. Peter Jordan was also a vice president from the date of the formation of the company. The dock was located at the foot of 14th Street in Astoria. The pier later become known as the Brix pier, named for Peter John Brix, the original founder of Knappton Towboat Co., which acquired Callendar Navigation in 1922 by merger.

=== Fleet composition ===
In 1908, the Callendar Navigation Company was engaged in towing, freighting, and excursions. In February 1908, the Callendar fleet comprised the steamers Melville, Jordan, Wenona, Vanguard, Eclipse, and the gasoline launch Queen. The company also had six barges which it advertised as "suitable for moving logging engines, lumber, etc." The barges ranged in size from 50 to 700 tons, with a total capacity of 2,000 tons So many barges were being built in Astoria in early 1907 that company vice-president Max Skibbe had to go by steamer to Coos Bay to arrange for construction of several large ones for the use of the company.

In late December 1905, it had been reported that Callendar Navigation Co. was considering converting its entire fleet over to oil-fueled boilers in the near future, with the steamer Jordan being the first to undergo the change.

=== Shipping line agency ===
In 1906, Callendar Navigation Co. was the Astoria agent for the fast sternwheeler Telegraph. By 1908, the company had become an agent for North Pacific Steamship Co., the California & Oregon Coast Steamship Co. and E.A. Dodge & Company. These companies operated passenger and freight steamships to all ports on west coast of the United States from Astoria to San Pedro, California.

=== Acquisition of Wenona ===
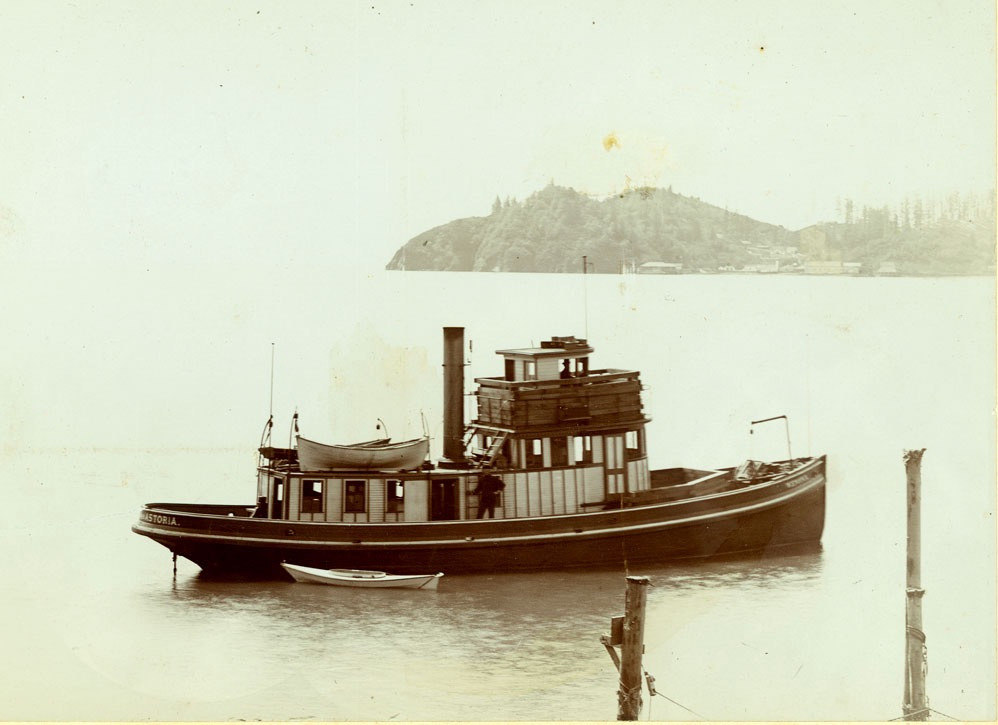
Wenona at Astoria, circa 1910.

Wenona had been built at Porter, Oregon by shipbuilder Emil H. Heuckendorf (1849–1908). Wenona was towed from Coos Bay by the steamer Alliance in early November 1904. Along the way, the tow line reportedly parted three times, twice at sea, and once when crossing the Columbia Bar. On arrival, Wenona was taken possession of by Captain John R. Pickernell (1840–1913) and outfitted by the Astoria Iron Works. In May 1905, Wenona was placed on the Grays River run.

In February 1908 Wenona was sold for $9,000 to the Gray's River Transportation Company, with Captain W.E. Hull in command. Gray's River Transportation Co. consisted of William E. Hull, John Johnson, and Oscar Oleson. Hull had only a few years before passed the government examination to handle vessels of less than 100 tons. Wenona continued to use the Callendar dock in Astoria. Wenona was scheduled to make its first run to Gray's River on March 12, 1908. There was also an earlier vessel in 1890 called Winona, which operated in the lower Columbia on the Deep River route. In 1908, Wenona made daily runs between Astoria and Gray's River, and Jordan ran on the Astoria-Deep River route. The other steamers were employed towing log rafts in and around Astoria.

== Merger with Knappton Towboat Co. ==
On July 1, 1922, Callendar Navigation Co. merged with its rival, Knappton Towboat Co., and the combined company's towing business would operate under the Knappton name. Henry M. Skibbe, son of Capt. Max Skibbe, and Harry Flavel, grandson of famed Columbia River pilot Capt. George Flavel, were in charge of the merged companies, whose headquarters were to be at the Callendar dock in Astoria. Calendar Navigation Co. would continue operate its wharf and storage business under its own name.

Knappton Towing had been engaged in the towing of logs, using its six steamers: Knappton, Coquille, Electro, Defender, and Myrtle, and two oil barges. At the time of the merger, Calendar Navigation Co. operated Melville, Myrtle, Jordan, and Ida W., a derrick barge, an oil barge, and four lighters.

Knappton Towboat Co. existed until 1990, when its name was changed to Brix Maritime. In 1993, Brix Maritime became part of Foss Marine.
