= Cascade Bicycle Club =

Cycling organization in Seattle

- Formation: 1970
- Type: NGO
- Tax ID no.: 91-2165219
- Legal status: 501(c)(3)
- Purpose: Bicycling recreation, education and advocacy
- Headquarters: Seattle, Washington
- Location: 7787 62nd Ave. NE, Seattle WA
- Coordinates: 47°41′17.3″N 122°15′53.4″W
- Region served: Washington state
- Members: 10,000
- Executive Director: Lee Lambert
- Budget: 3 Million
- Staff: 30
- Volunteers: 700
- Website: www.cascade.org

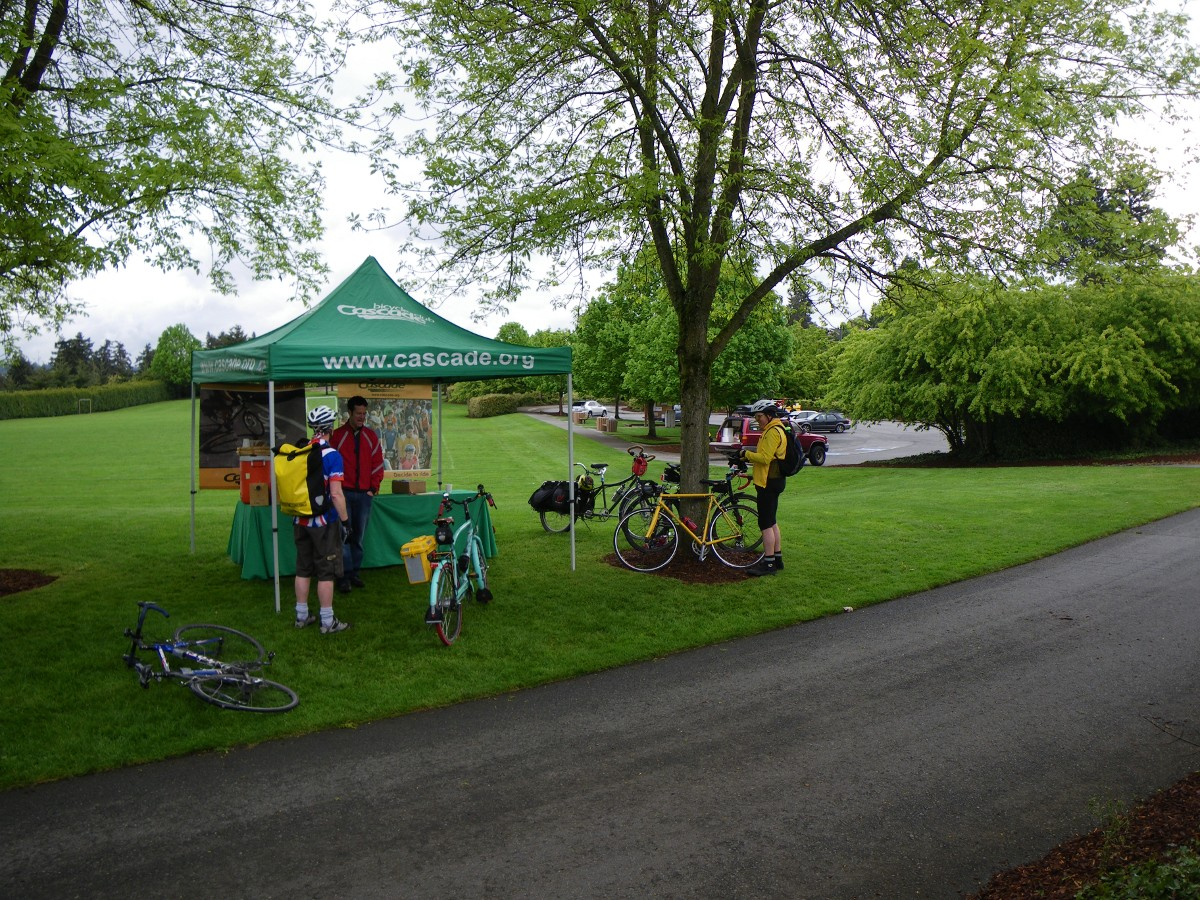
Commuter outreach booth

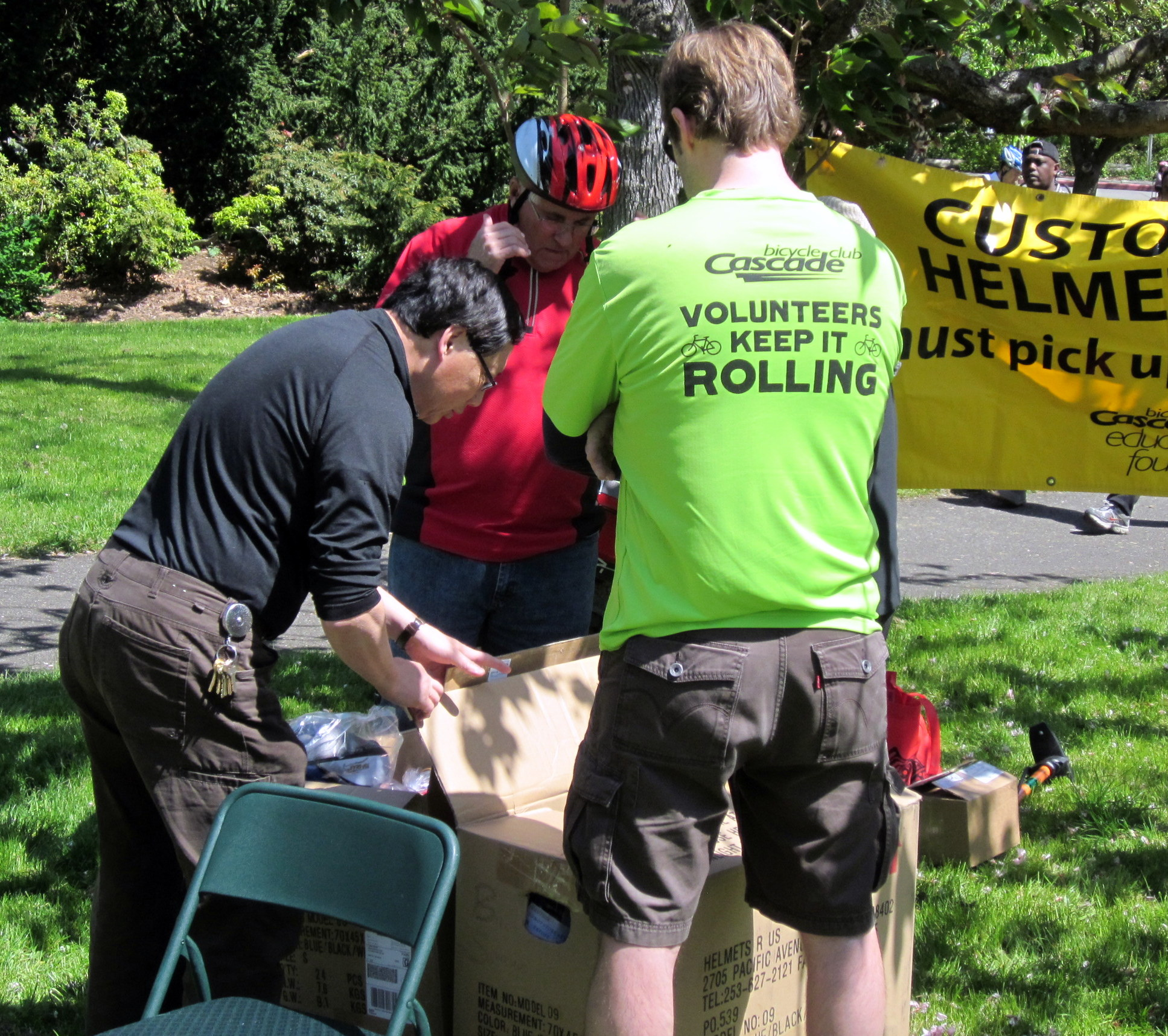
Helmet promotion event

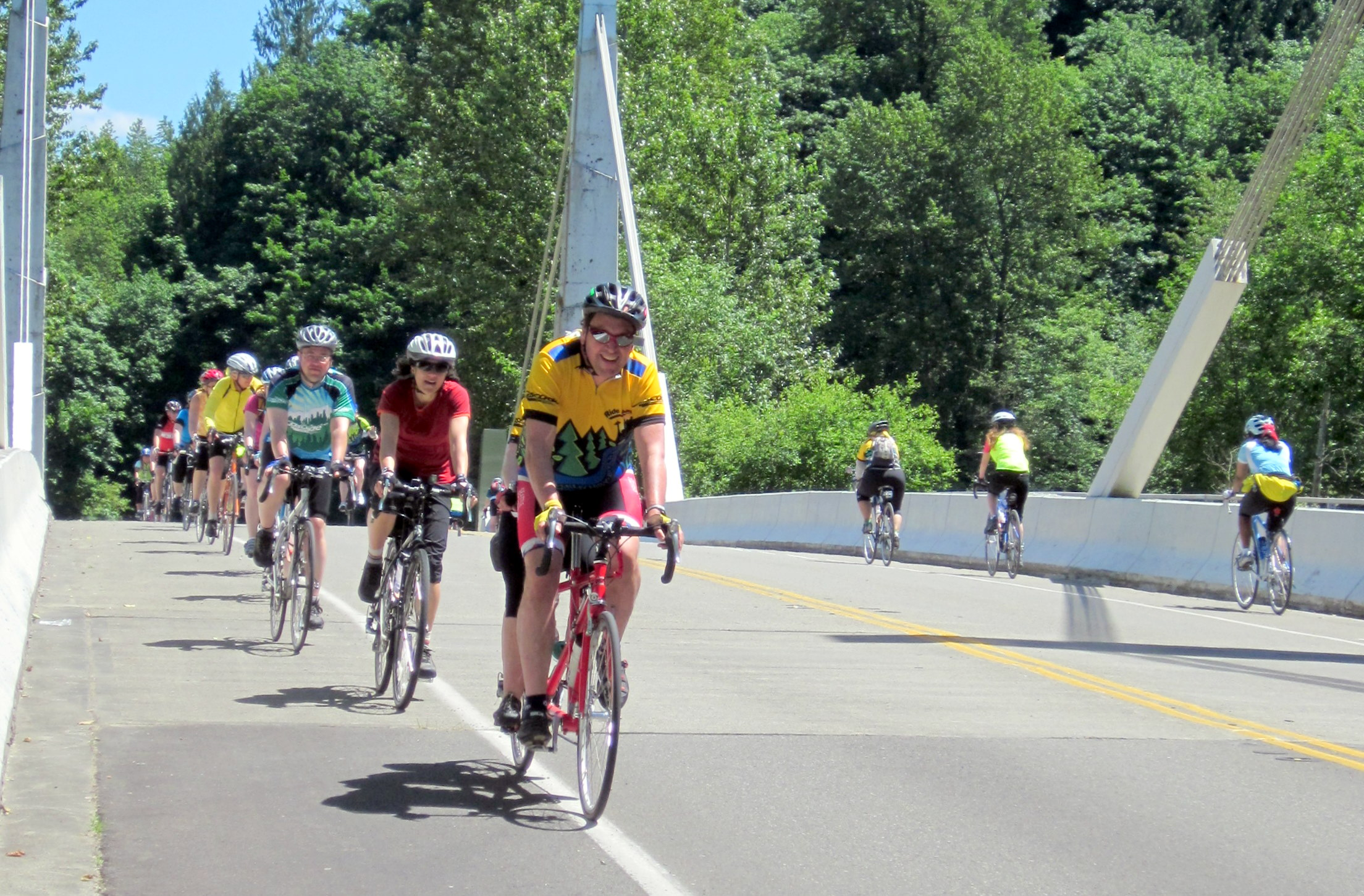
The Cascade Bicycle Club training series

The Cascade Bicycle Club is a nonprofit community organization based in Seattle, Washington in the United States. It is the largest statewide bicycling nonprofit in the United States with almost 10,000 members. It is run by a volunteer board of directors, 30 professional staff, and more than 700 volunteers.

== Major events ==
Cascade hosts several major riding events every year including Chilly Hilly, Ride for Major Taylor, Flying Wheels Summer Century, Seattle to Portland Bicycle Classic (STP), Ride from Seattle to Vancouver and Party (RSVP), Woodinville Wine Ride, and Kitsap Color Classic (KCC). Ride participation varies from 200 to 8,000 per event.

== Pedaling Relief Project ==
The Pedaling Relief Project was started in the spring of 2020 during the COVID-19 pandemic to address food insecurity challenges and reduce food waste in the community, and was made permanent in 2021. The project has two main programs: food rescue, and home delivery. The food rescue program retrieves donated food (that would in most cases otherwise become food waste) from local grocery stores and delivers it to food banks and direct distribution events such as those run by Food Not Bombs. The home delivery program works with food banks to deliver bags of groceries packed by food bank volunteers to local clients who face challenges in visiting the food bank themselves. Both programs make use of cargo bikes and trailers to carry large quantities of food efficiently.

== Advocacy ==
In addition to producing material for the public on bicycling, the Cascade Bicycle Club lobbies local government on behalf of people who ride bikes. Advocacy staff produced a paper titled "Left by the Side of the Road" asserting the shortfall of safe, effective bicycle routes in the region.

From 2009-2011 the club successfully lobbied for a law to increase penalties for negligent drivers who injured or killed vulnerable users of the road, including bicyclists and pedestrians. The club found that under state law, drivers were fined as low as $42. A version of the Vulnerable User Bill passed in 2011 with wide bipartisan support. The bill increased mandatory fines, but allowed the fines to be reduced by a judge, who could proscribe driver safety education and community service.

The Cascade Bicycle lobbies have petitioned for extending and building trails along the Burke-Gilman Trail through the industrial waterfront of Ballard. After local businesses obstructed progress of the project, the club joined the City of Seattle in a lawsuit to move trail construction forward.
