= Stella, Washington =

Unincorporated community in Washington, United States

- Unincorporated community
- Location in the state of Washington Stella (the United States)
- Coordinates: 46°11′26″N 123°07′11″W
- Country: United States
- State: Washington
- County: Cowlitz
- Elevation: 282 ft (86 m)
- Time zone: UTC−8 (PST)
  - Summer (DST): UTC−7 (PDT)
- ZIP Code: 98632
- Area code(s): 360, 564
- FIPS code: 53-67780
- GNIS feature ID: 1511334

Stella is an unincorporated community in Cowlitz County, Washington. Stella is located northwest of the city of Longview, reached by traveling westbound out of the city along Washington State Route 4, also known as Ocean Beach Highway, and turning north onto Stella Road. The Stella community is part of the Longview School District, a K-12 school district of about 6,600 students.

The community was named after Stella Packard, the daughter of a local merchant.
