= Pillar Rock (Washington) =

Coordinates: 46°15′29″N 123°35′14″W

For the mountain and rock in the English Lake District, search under Pillar (Lake District)

Pillar Rock is a pillar-like monolith in the Columbia River, near its mouth in the state of Washington. Originally rising 75-100 feet, it was dynamited and reduced in height to about 25 feet above the water to serve as a navigational aid and light. The Lewis and Clark Expedition camped twice near the rock, on November 7 and November 25, 1805.

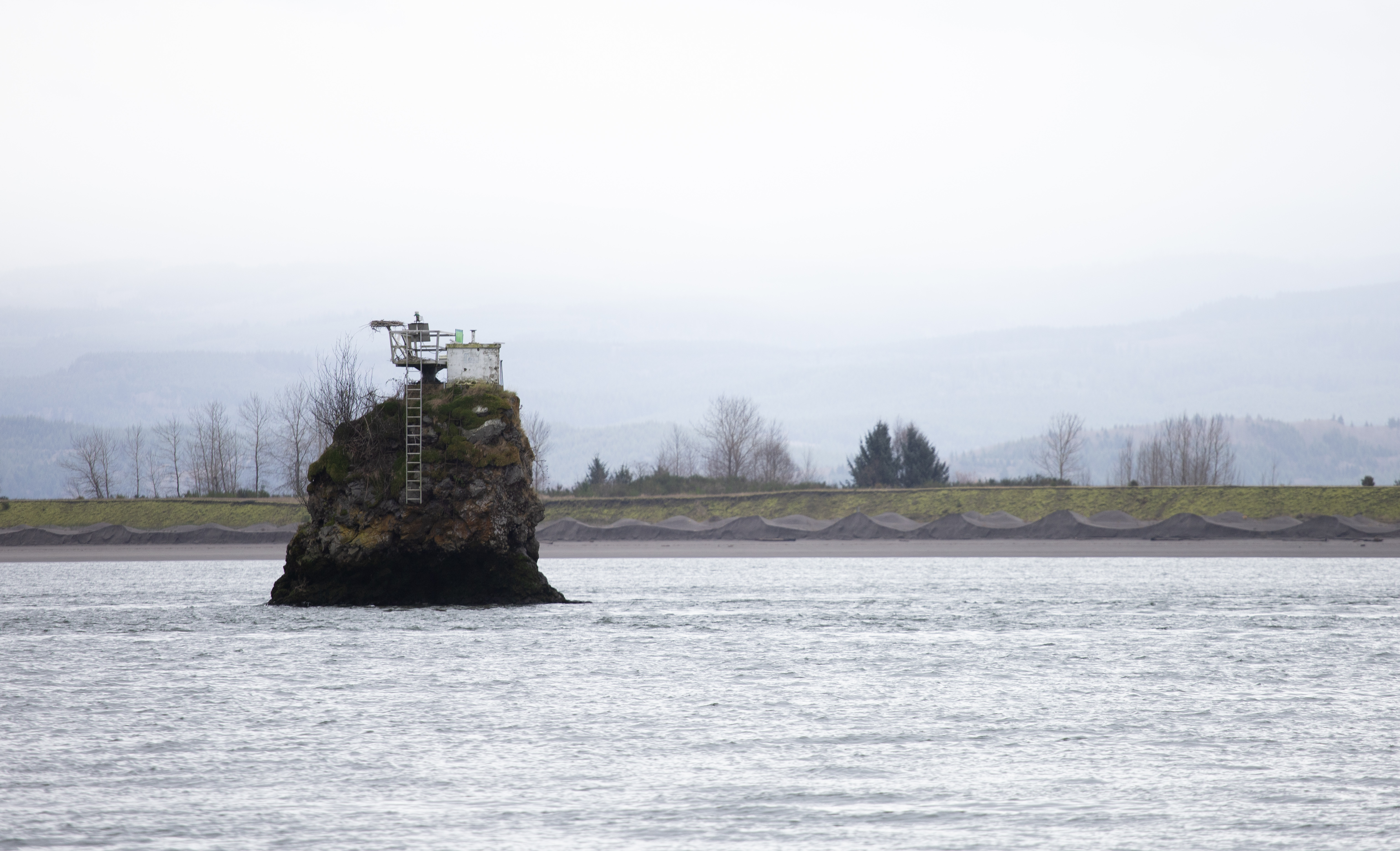
Pillar Rock

The name "Pillar Rock" also refers to a small village on the river's north shore, opposite the rock. As recently as 1851, the village was home to a small group of the Kathlamet band of Chinook Indians under the headship of a man named Tolillicum.
