= Grays River (Washington) =

River in Washington state

- Location of the mouth of Grays River in Washington
- Etymology: Robert Gray

Location
- Country: United States
- State: Washington
- County: Wahkiakum, Pacific

Physical characteristics
- Source: Willapa Hills
  - coordinates: 46°28′57″N 123°23′46″W
- Mouth: Grays Bay (Washington State)
  - location: Columbia River
  - coordinates: 46°18′10″N 123°41′18″W
  - elevation: 0 ft (0 m)
- Length: 30 mi (48 km)
- Basin size: 124 sq mi (320 km^{2})

Basin features
- Geographic Names Information System: 1505254

Grays River is a tributary of the Columbia River, approximately 30 miles (48 km) long, in southwestern Washington in the United States. One of the last tributaries of the Columbia on the Washington side, it drains an area of low hills north of the mouth of the river.

== Course ==
Grays River rises in the eastern Willapa Hills in Washington state's southwestern Pacific County. It flows generally southwesterly across western Wahkiakum County. The river has three fork tributaries, the East Fork, South Fork, and West Fork Grays River. Below the West Fork confluence the main river valley broadens. Washington State Route 4 passes through the valley and the communities of Grays River and Rosburg. Fossil Creek joins Grays River above the highway and villages. Hull Creek joins from the north after passing through the village of Grays River. Roughly 5 miles (8.0 km) southwest of the village of Grays River, the river enters the broad portion of the Columbia River's tidal estuary from the north, at Grays Bay, about 15 miles (24 km) upstream from the Columbia's mouth. Grays River becomes tidal at the village of Grays River. In its lower course, especially below Rosburg, the river broadens due to the influence of tides.

The hills and ridges that separate Grays River's watershed from other watersheds is called the Grays River Divide. Rivers whose watersheds lie across the Grays River Divide include the Elochoman River, Chehalis River, Willapa River, and Naselle River. The short Deep River lies just west of Grays River and, like Grays River, empties into Grays Bay.

== History ==
In 1841 Charles Wilkes of the United States Exploring Expedition charted the river, calling it "Ebokwol". In 1853 it was given another Indian name, "Moolhool", the name used by the Chinookan-speaking natives of the area.

The American fur trader Robert Gray, captain of the Columbia Rediviva, entered the mouth of the Columbia River in May 1792. Gray and his crew were the first non-indigenous people to do so. After a few days of exploring and trading the Columbia Rediviva ran aground briefly on a sandbar in what is now known as Grays Bay. A boat scouted ahead and determined that the channel Gray they been following on the north side of the Columbia quickly became unnavigable. Gray decided not to venture farther upriver, instead anchoring in Grays Bay for several days, trading and refitting the ship. Gray went ashore and later made a chart of Grays Bay and the mouth of Grays River. A copy of the chart was given to George Vancouver. In October 1792 Vancouver's lieutenant, William Broughton entered and explored the Columbia River. It was Broughton, who had a copy of Gray's chart, who named Grays Bay and Grays River after Robert Gray.

In the early 1900s, steamboat service from Grays River to Astoria was provided by the Callendar Navigation Company.

At the community of Grays River it is crossed by the Grays River Covered Bridge. The bridge is listed on the National Register of Historic Places and is one of the only covered bridges still in use in Washington (the Cedar Creek Grist Mill east of Woodland, WA also has a covered bridge still in use by dozens of vehicles daily).

== Natural history ==
Grays River supports populations of coho salmon, sea-run coastal cutthroat trout, and winter-run steelhead. While the river's coho numbers are fairly low—about one hundred per year—and the cutthroat numbers are low, the steelhead are a draw for sport fishing. In addition Sturgeon are present just off the river's mouth in Grays Bay.

Estimates of historical fish populations range from 1,500-10,000 chinook salmon, 8,000-14,000 chum salmon, and 5,000-40,000 coho salmon. Currently the number of natural spawning returns is 100-300 chinook and 500-10,000 chum. Current natural coho salmon return numbers are not known but are assumed to be low.

The fish draw sea lions to the river during the migration seasons.

== Recreation ==
Grays River is a popular destination for whitewater rafting and kayaking.

== See also ==
- List of rivers of Washington (state)
- Tributaries of the Columbia River
