= Lewis and Clark Bridge (Columbia River) =

Historic bridge in Washington state and Oregon, USA

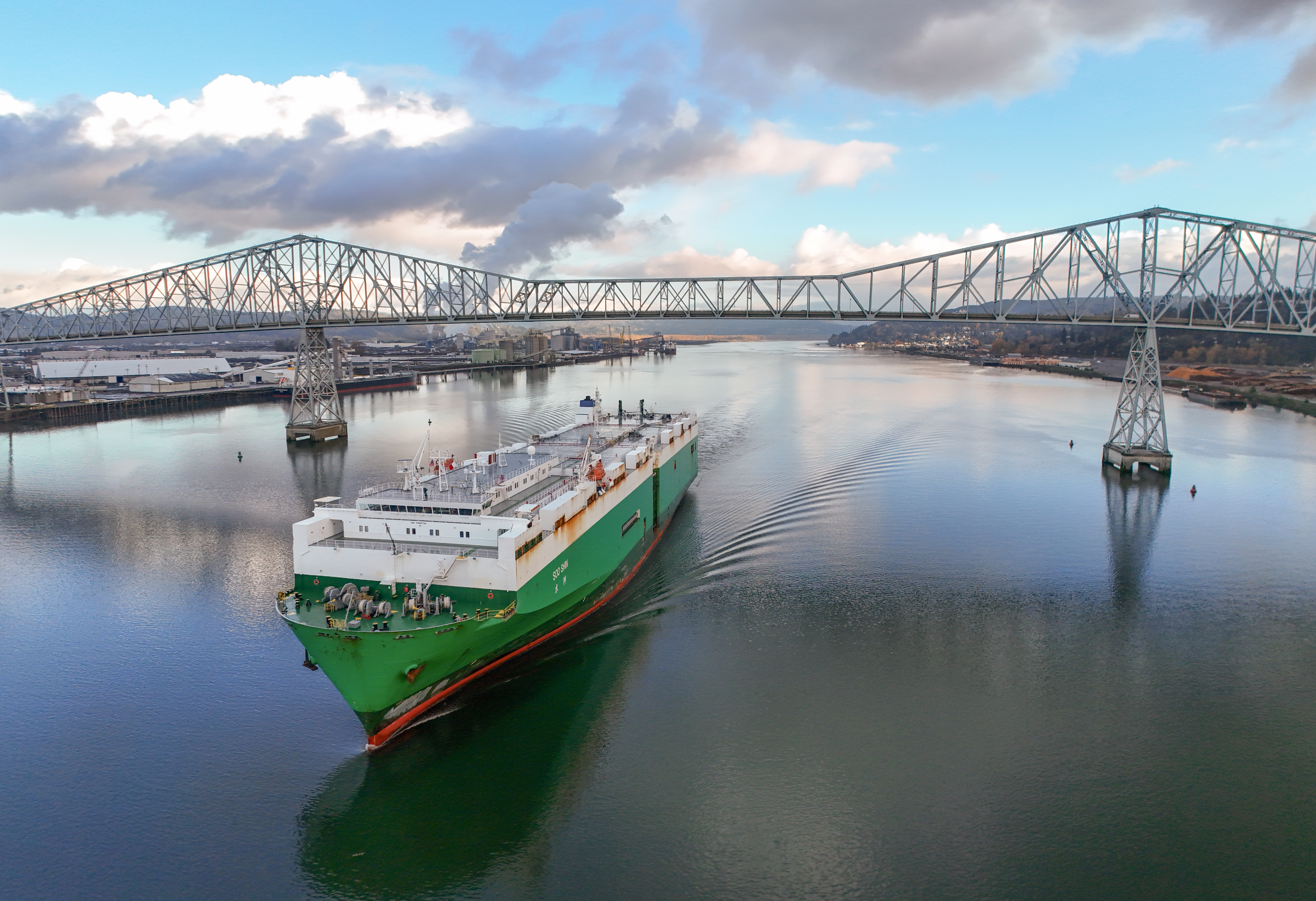
- Coordinates: 46°06′17″N 122°57′42″W
- Carries: SR 433
- Crosses: Columbia River
- Locale: Longview, Washington, to Rainier, Oregon
- Maintained by: Washington State Department of Transportation

Characteristics
- Design: Cantilever through truss
- Total length: 2,722 feet (830 m)
- Longest span: 1,200 feet (370 m)

History
- Designer: Joseph Strauss
- Opened: March 29, 1930
- Longview Bridge
- U.S. National Register of Historic Places
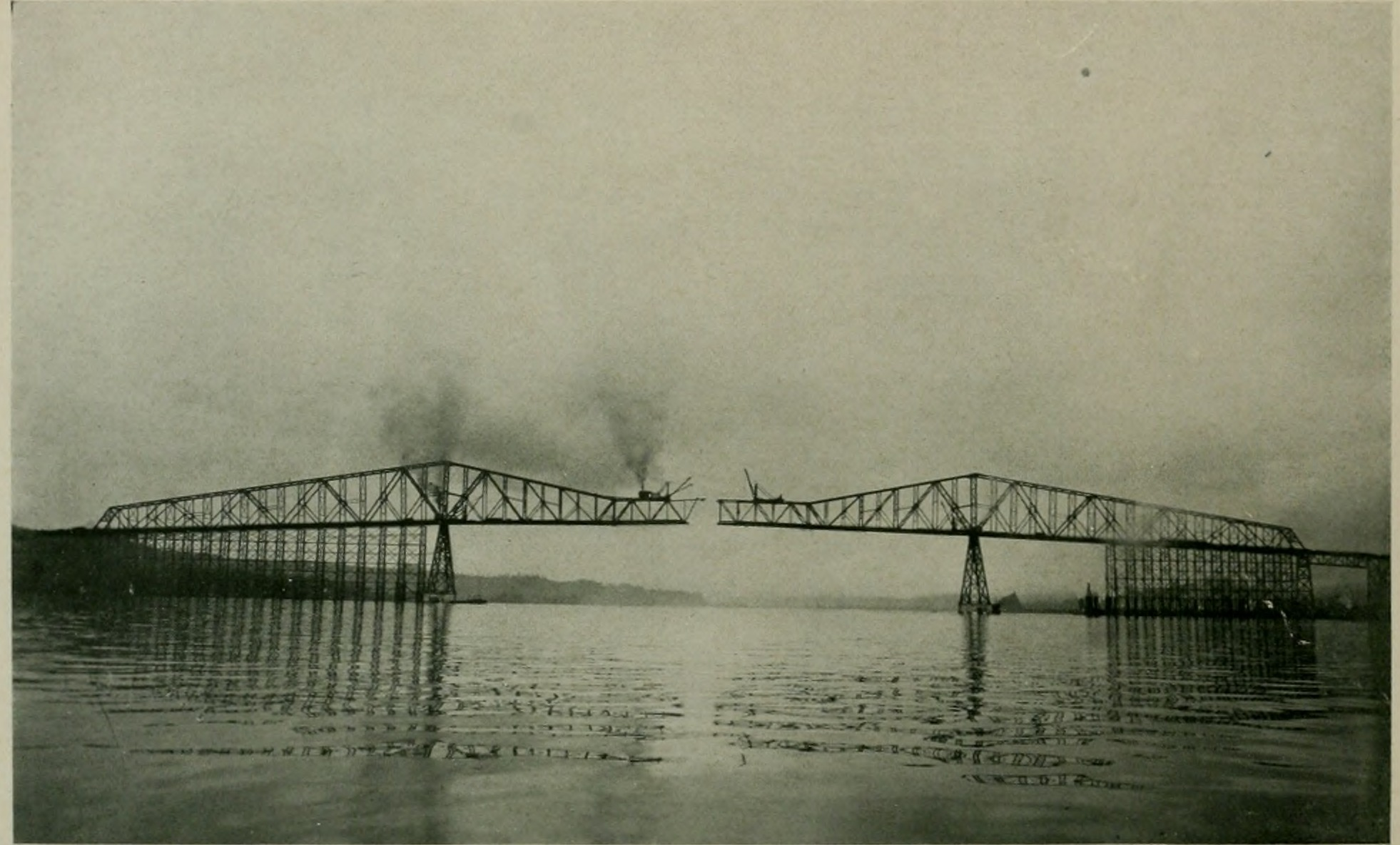

- Location within Washington (state) Location within Oregon Location within the United States
- Location: Spans Columbia River, Longview, Washington
- Coordinates: 46°6′16.8″N 122°57′42.6″W
- Area: 7.2 acres (2.9 ha)
- Built: 1929–30
- Built by: J. H. Pomeroy & Co.
- Architect: Strauss Engineering Corp.
- Architectural style: cantilever bridge
- MPS: Historic Bridges/Tunnels in Washington State TR
- NRHP reference No.: 82004208
- Added to NRHP: July 16, 1982

Location
- Interactive map of Lewis and Clark Bridge

The Lewis and Clark Bridge is a cantilever bridge that spans the Columbia River between Longview, Washington, and Rainier, Oregon. It is the only bridge over the Columbia between Astoria and Portland (a distance of about 90 miles (145 km)). At the time of its completion, it had the longest cantilever span in the United States.

The bridge was opened on March 29, 1930, as a privately owned bridge named the Longview Bridge. The $5.8 million cost (equivalent to $86 million in 2024 dollars) was recovered by tolls, $1.00 for cars and $0.10 for pedestrians (equivalent to $14.9 for cars and $1.49 for pedestrians in 2024 dollars). At the time it was the longest and highest cantilever bridge in the United States. The state of Washington purchased the bridge in 1947 and the tolls were removed in 1965 after the bridge was paid for. In 1980, the bridge was rededicated as the Lewis and Clark Bridge in honor of the Lewis and Clark Expedition. The deck was replaced in 2003–04 at a cost of $29.2 million.

Due to its width, there are very few bridges over the western portion of the Columbia River, which forms the border of Washington and Oregon. Until the completion of the Astoria-Megler Bridge in 1966, this was the only bridge over the Columbia west of Portland.

The bridge is 2,722 ft (830 m) long with 210 ft (64 m) of vertical clearance. The main span is 1,200 ft (366 m) long and the top of the bridge is 340 ft (104 m) above the river. It was designed by Joseph Strauss, the engineer of the Golden Gate Bridge.

In 1982, the bridge was entered on the National Register of Historic Places, as the Longview Bridge. A feasibility study commissioned by the Washington State Legislature in 1990 recommended the construction of a second bridge to handle future traffic volume. The Lewis and Clark Bridge was closed for four days in July 2023 to replace a floor beam and install new finger joints; during the closure, which was originally scheduled for eight days, the Wahkiakum County Ferry was used as a detour route for prioritized traffic.

== See also ==
- Lewis and Clark River Bridge
- List of bridges documented by the Historic American Engineering Record in Washington (state)
- List of bridges in the United States by height
- List of bridges on the National Register of Historic Places in Oregon
