= Rosburg, Washington =

- CDP
- Location within Washington (state)
- Coordinates: 46°18′14″N 123°37′22″W
- Country: United States
- State: Washington
- County: Wahkiakum
- Elevation: 341 ft (104 m)

Population (2020)
  - Total: 340
- Time zone: UTC-8 (Pacific (PST))
  - Summer (DST): UTC-7 (PDT)
- ZIP Code: 98643
- Area code(s): 360, 564
- GNIS feature ID: 2585031

Rosburg is a Census-designated place (CDP) in Wahkiakum County, Washington, United States. Rosburg is located on the Grays River near Washington State Route 4, 15 miles (24 km) northwest of Cathlamet. Rosburg has a post office with ZIP Code 98643. The CDP includes the communities of Eden and Oneida. As of the 2020 census, Rosburg had a population of 340.

Christian Rosburg, the town's first postmaster, named Rosburg for himself.

== Demographics ==
Historical population
Census	Pop.	Note	%±
2010	317		—
2020	340		7.3%
U.S. Decennial Census; 2000 2010

Rosburg first appeared as a census designated place in the 2010 U.S. census.

=== Racial and ethnic composition ===
Rosburg CDP, Washington – Racial and ethnic composition Note: the US Census treats Hispanic/Latino as an ethnic category. This table excludes Latinos from the racial categories and assigns them to a separate category. Hispanics/Latinos may be of any race.
Race / Ethnicity (NH = Non-Hispanic)	Pop 2010	Pop 2020	% 2010	% 2020
White alone (NH)	298	294	94.01%	86.47%
Black or African American alone (NH)	0	3	0.00%	0.88%
Native American or Alaska Native alone (NH)	3	5	0.95%	1.47%
Asian alone (NH)	5	6	1.58%	1.76%
Native Hawaiian or Pacific Islander alone (NH)	0	0	0.00%	0.00%
Other race alone (NH)	0	0	0.00%	0.00%
Mixed race or Multiracial (NH)	3	18	0.95%	5.29%
Hispanic or Latino (any race)	8	14	2.52%	4.12%
Total	317	340	100.00%	100.00%

=== 2020 census ===
As of the 2020 census, there were 340 people, 184 housing units, and 132 families in Rosburg. Rosburg had 298 White people, 3 African Americans, 5 Native Americans, 6 Asians, 8 people who were from some other race, and 20 people from two or more races. 14 people were Hispanic or Latino.

The ancestry of Rosburg was 15.5% English, 14.2% Italian, 13.1% German, 10% Irish, 6.6% Sub-Saharan African, 1.6% French, 1.3% Scottish, and 0.8% Norwegian.

The median age in Rosburg was 34.8 years old. 15% of the population were older than 65, with 12.3% 65 to 74, 2.6% 75 to 84, and 0.0% older than 85.

The median income was $87,500 in Rosburg. 7.9% of the population were in poverty, with 7.4% of people 18 to 64 years being in poverty, and 29.8% of people 65 or older being in poverty.
