= West Longview, Washington =

Unincorporated community in Washington, United States

- Census-designated place
- Location of West Longview, Washington
- Coordinates: 46°10′04″N 122°59′56″W
- Country: United States
- State: Washington
- County: Cowlitz

Area
  - Total: 1.6 sq mi (4.1 km^{2})
  - Land: 1.6 sq mi (4.1 km^{2})
  - Water: 0 sq mi (0.0 km^{2})
- Elevation: 7 ft (2.1 m)

Population (2000)
  - Total: 2,882
  - Density: 1,820/sq mi (702.8/km^{2})
- Time zone: UTC-8 (Pacific (PST))
  - Summer (DST): UTC-7 (PDT)
- ZIP Code: 98632
- Area code(s): 360, 564
- FIPS code: 53-77547
- GNIS feature ID: 2409554

West Longview is a census-designated place (CDP), in Cowlitz County, Washington. West Longview is located on western border of the city of Longview, Washington. The population was 2,882 according to the 2000 United States census.

== Geography ==
According to the 2000 United States census, it had a total area of 1.6 square miles (4.1 km^{2}), all of it land.

== Demographics ==
Historical population
Census	Pop.	Note	%±
1980	2,108		—
1990	3,163		50.0%
2000	2,882		−8.9%
U.S. Decennial Census

The CDP was deleted prior to the 2010 U.S. census after being partly annexed to the city of Longview.

As of the census of 2000, there were 2,882 people, 1,111 households, and 765 families residing in the CDP. The population density was 1,820.3 people per square mile (704.3/km^{2}). There were 1,153 housing units at an average density of 728.2/sq mi (281.8/km^{2}). The racial makeup of the CDP was 89.87% White, 0.59% African American, 1.87% Native American, 2.50% Asian, 0.42% Pacific Islander, 1.84% from other races, and 2.91% from two or more races. Hispanic or Latino of any race were 4.16% of the population.

There were 1,111 households, out of which 34.9% had children under the age of 18 living with them, 51.5% were married couples living together, 12.2% had a female householder with no husband present, and 31.1% were non-families. 24.5% of all households were made up of individuals, and 9.1% had someone living alone who was 65 years of age or older. The average household size was 2.59 and the average family size was 3.08.

In the CDP the age distribution of the population shows 28.1% under the age of 18, 9.6% from 18 to 24, 28.7% from 25 to 44, 21.8% from 45 to 64, and 11.7% who were 65 years of age or older. The median age was 35 years. For every 100 females, there were 94.2 males. For every 100 females age 18 and over, there were 94.6 males.

The median income for a household in the CDP was $34,421, and the median income for a family was $37,104. Males had a median income of $39,946 versus $25,658 for females. The per capita income for the CDP was $15,082. About 15.4% of families and 20.2% of the population were below the poverty line, including 30.4% of those under age 18 and 5.6% of those age 65 or over.
