= Seattle to Portland Bicycle Classic =

Organized bicycle ride

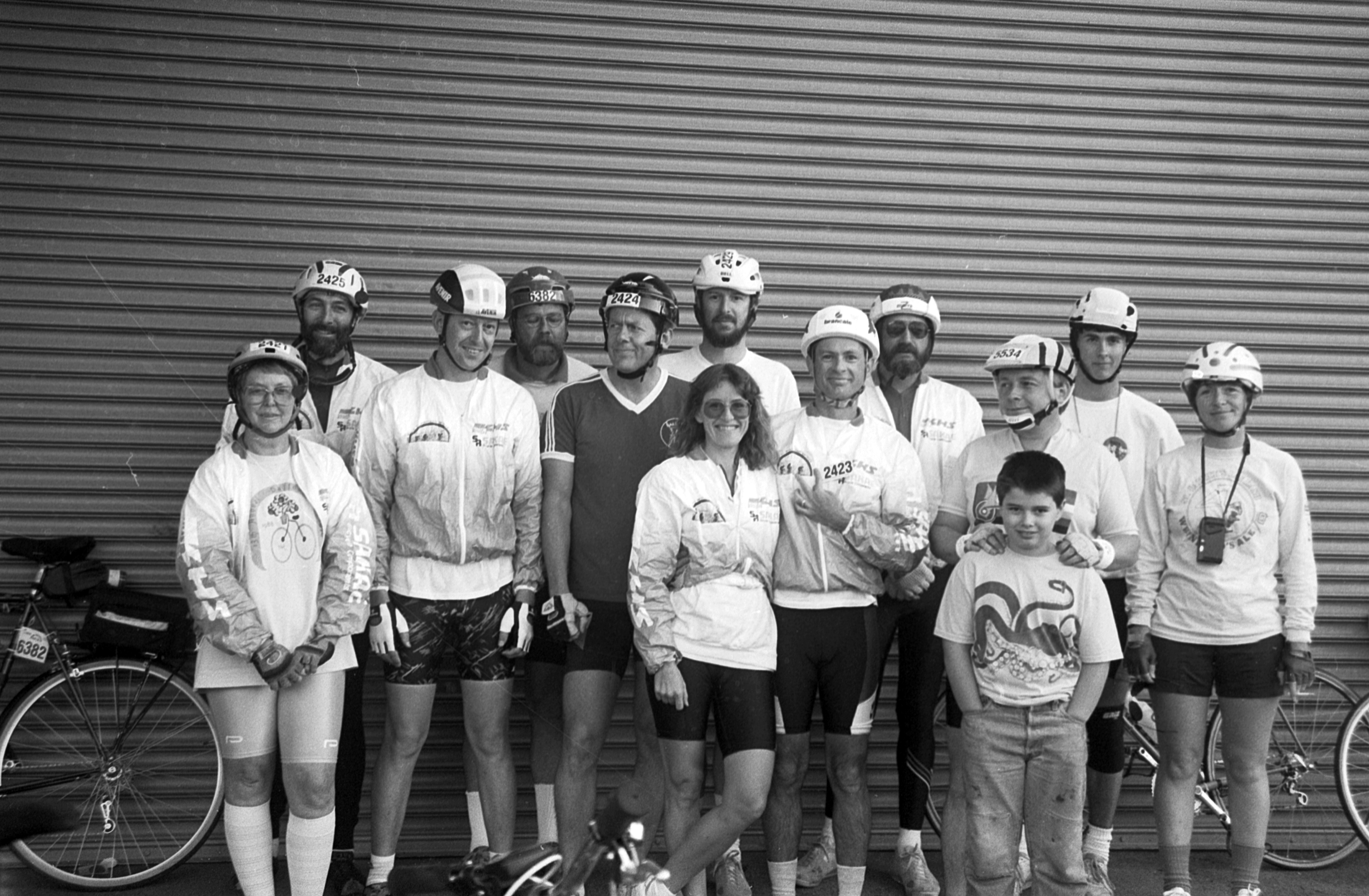
- Participants in the Seattle to Portland Bicycle Classic in 1988
- Locations: Seattle, Washington, Portland, Oregon
- Organizer: Cascade Bicycle Club

The Seattle to Portland, or STP, is an annual one- or two-day supported bicycle ride from Seattle, Washington, to Portland, Oregon, in the United States. The STP "is considered one of the 10 biggest recreational bicycle rides in the country, drawing riders from across the nation and from other nations", and has been operating since 1979. The ride is organized by the Cascade Bicycle Club. It is approximately 206 miles (332 km) in length. Most riders complete the distance in two days; however, 1854 of the nearly 8000 riders attempted to ride in one day (2018).

== About ==
The ride takes place on the second or third weekend in July mostly on country roads, avoiding Interstate 5 (the freeway between the cities). The Cascade Bicycle Club describes the 2006 route as "pretty flat with the “Big Hill” coming at the 45-mile mark. It's a mile long with about a 7 percent grade. ... The majority of the ride is on beautiful, rolling rural roads". In 2005 approximately 30 miles (48 km) of the 202 miles (325 km) were considered uphill with a combined ascent of approximately 2,000 feet (600 m).

The official midpoint is in Centralia, Washington, on the campus of Centralia College. Amenities include overnight accommodations, showers, first aid, chiropractic and massage, bicycle repair and storage, food and drink vendors, pancake feed and breakfast to go, live music, and a beer garden. The twin city of Chehalis is used as an overflow option to Centralia.

== Support ==
The ride is supported, meaning that food is provided at stops approximately every 25 miles (40 km) along the route. The stops include, in part: Seward Park, Tenino, Vader, Goble, and Scappoose. In 2004 volunteers handed out "more than 11,000 bananas, 4 tons of watermelon, 13,000 bagels and 18,000 sandwiches". There is some mechanical support, provided by Performance Bicycle stores from Tacoma, Seattle, Redmond and Lynwood WA. The Cascade Bicycle Club also arranges transportation for riders to Seattle the day before as well as a return trip to Seattle after the ride.

== History ==
The first STP took place in 1979 and was a race. From 1979 - 2019, the ride took place every year including 1980 when the route was changed because of the eruption of Mount St. Helens, also ending in Seattle. In 2020 and 2021, the event was cancelled due to the COVID-19 pandemic. From 1981, the Cascade Bicycle Club changed the event from a race to "recreational ride". Jerry Baker from Seattle was the winner of the first STP race. Baker, and Paul Wantzelius from Maple Valley, Washington, were the only riders who attended every consecutive STP, until their deaths, Wantzelius in 2010 and Baker in 2015. Despite being a cycling event people have taken part on unicycles, inline skates and two skateboarders have done it using a technique known as long distance skateboard pumping.

Participation reached a peak in 1989, the tenth year (Paul Zakar, Director‘86 to‘89) when the limit of 10,000 riders took part. In recent years the Cascade Bicycle Club has imposed a limit on the number of participants. The limit was 9,000 in 2007.

The 2010 event sold out 10,000 slots on April 26, 2010. The 32nd annual Group Health Seattle to Portland Bicycle Classic was held on July 9 and July 10, 2011 and sold out the 10,000 spots in advance.

In 1980 an additional ride became the annual Ride from Seattle to Vancouver, BC and Party (RSVP).

== See also ==
- Cycling in Portland, Oregon
