= Port of Longview =

Deep-water port authority in Longview, Washington, USA

- Formation: 1921
- Type: Port authority
- Headquarters: 10 Port Way; Longview, WA 98632
- Location: Cowlitz County, Washington State, USA
- Coordinates: 46°06′50″N 122°57′30″W
- Region served: Northern Cowlitz County
- Website: http://www.portoflongview.com

Steel pipe in a temporary storage yard

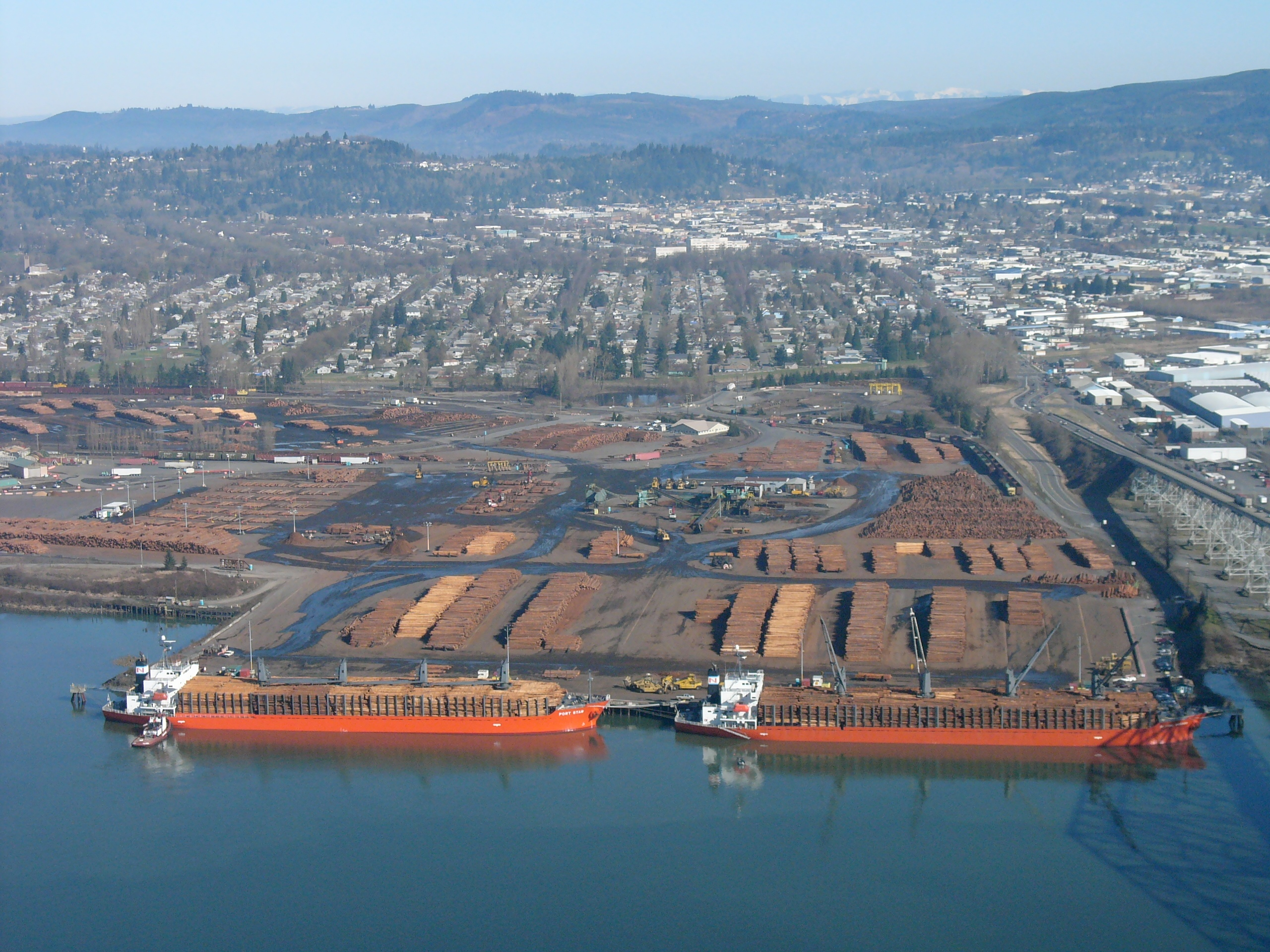
Timber for export, Port of Longview, 2008.

The Port of Longview is a deep-water port authority located in Longview, on the Columbia River in southwest Washington, United States. It was established in 1921 by Washington state law, and operates as a unit of local government. The port is overseen by a locally elected, three-member board of commissioners. Each commissioner is elected for a six-year term and is directly responsible to the voters for port operations.

The Port manages and operates a marine terminal complex where domestic and international ships and barges arrive and depart, and bulk, break bulk and project cargos are loaded or unloaded by local labor union workers. Union workers operate lifting and moving equipment including cranes, forklifts and reach stackers. These workers belong to the International Longshore and Warehouse Union Local 21.

Transportation routes connecting to the Port include the Columbia River shipping channel, the BNSF Railway and Union Pacific railroads, and north–south Interstate 5, the main highway running from Mexico to Canada.

The Port also leases industrial land and contributes financially towards recreational projects in Cowlitz County.

== Mission ==
To promote commerce and economic development through strategic public investments for the benefit of our communities.

== Location ==
The Port of Longview is located 66 river miles inland from the Pacific Ocean on the deep-draft Columbia River shipping channel. It is approximately 120 driving miles from Seattle, Washington and 40 miles from Portland, Oregon. The Port district occupies the northern two-thirds of Cowlitz County, from just north of Kalama, Washington to the Lewis County line.

== Transportation ==
=== Rail ===
The BNSF Railway and Union Pacific railroad main lines run parallel to Interstate 5 approximately five miles from the Port. The Longview Switching Company switches trains from the railroad main lines into the Port. From there, Port locomotives move trains and rail cars to the marine terminals and industrial locations.

=== Highway ===
The Port is located approximately three miles from north-south Interstate 5, the main roadway stretching from Mexico to Canada.

== Facilities ==
Project cargo unloading using shore-side crane

Facilities include eight marine terminals (docks), covered and uncovered warehouses, and open storage areas for temporary storage of cargo prior to loading on trucks, specialized trailers or rail cars.

- Bridgeview Terminal (Berth 1 & 2) – export bulk facility for agri-products, chemical, and minerals
- Berth 4 – bulk loading terminal available for redevelopment
- Berth 5 – Petroleum coke export facility operated by the Port for BP
- Berth 6 – general cargo berth handling steel, wind energy, forest products and project cargo
- Berth 7 – general cargo, barge loading and import bulk terminal
- Berth 8 – multi-purpose dock handling general cargo, project cargo, forest products and steel
- Berth 9 – bulk export facility, Export Grain Terminal

== Types of cargo ==
- Dry Bulk: petroleum coke, potash, soda ash, soya meal, talc, bentonite clay, other
- Break bulk: steel, logs
- Project: wind turbine components (towers, blades, nacelles), electrical generators, oversize components for industrial and manufacturing applications

== History ==
Pulp is loaded into the hold of a ship using ship's crane

In 1911, the state of Washington enacted laws allowing people to establish port districts and elect commissioners to administer those districts and oversee their development and operation. In 1921, the Port of Longview was established by a vote of the people residing within the local port district boundary (northern two-thirds of Cowlitz County, from just north of Kalama to the Lewis County line). Originally established as the Port of Kelso, the Port was later changed by a vote of the people, to the Port of Longview, because a state law required ports to be named after the largest city within the district.

Original cargo activity consisted of forest products (logs and lumber) exports to Asia. These exports began to decrease in the 1980s, and today are no longer handled by the Port. To replace log cargos, the Port now handles steel, bulk and project cargos.

== Commissioners and managers ==
=== Commissioners ===
- T. D. Dungan - 1921-24
- D. M. Atkins - 1921-24
- Elias Holbrook - 1921-24
- R. H. Barr - 1925-33
- Andrew Schwarz - 1924-24
- E. W. Ross - 1924-24
- Frank Dallam, Jr. - 1934-35
- Jess Schwarz - 1925-26
- Charles H. Olson - 1925-30
- W. C. Nikolaus - 1935-40
- J. Perry Burcham - 1927-32
- Luke L. Goodrich - 1930-50
- Walter S. Talbott - 1940-42
- A. A. Byrnes - 1933-40
- M. R. Couch - 1950-53
- N. F. Anderson - 1942-44
- George H. Umbaugh - 1940-69
- H. I. Quigley - 1953-69
- Roy Taylor - 1944-55
- James S. Baker - 1969-75
- Ralph G. Nolte - 1969-89
- William Graham - 1955-62
- Roy G. Dennis - 1976-81
- M. E. Norman - 1962-73
- Floyd V. Carpenter - 1982-87
- Richard F. Olson - 74-78
- Jerry Nestaval - 1988-93
- Larry M. Larson - 1978-2007
- J. Walter Barham - 1990-07
- Daniel J. Buell - 1994-2011
- Roger Allen - 2007-2007
- Darold Dietz - 2007-2015
- Bob Bagaason - 2007–2018
- Lou Johnson - 2012-2015
- Doug Averett - 2015–present
- Jeff Wilson - 2016–present
- Allan Erickson - 2018–present

=== Managers ===
- H. L. Tabke - 1925-27
- Frank Gowdy - 1927-43
- Harvey Hart - 1943-73
- Bob McNannay - 1973-86
- Brian Fladager - 1986-87
- Ken O'Hollaren - 1988-2012
- Geir-Eilif Kalhagen - 2012-2016
- Norman G. Krehbiel - 2016 - 2020
- Dan Stahl - 2020 interim

== See also ==
- American Association of Port Authorities

== Gallery ==
Project cargo is loaded onto a trailer by a reach stacker

Labor union workers unload structural steel from the hold of a ship

Project cargo unloading direct to rail car using ship's crane

Bulk cargo unloading using clam shell bucket and forklift
