= Grays River, Washington =

- CDP
- Location in the state of Washington
- Coordinates: 46°22′20″N 123°36′10″W
- Country: United States
- State: Washington
- County: Wahkiakum

Area
  - Total: 20.190 sq mi (52.293 km^{2})
  - Land: 20.124 sq mi (52.122 km^{2})
  - Water: 0.066 sq mi (0.171 km^{2}) 0.33%
- Elevation: 161 ft (49 m)

Population (2020)
  - Total: 248
- Population as of 2020 U.S. Census
- Time zone: UTC−8 (PST)
  - Summer (DST): UTC−7 (PDT)
- ZIP Code: 98621
- Area code(s): 360, 564
- FIPS code: 53-28450
- GNIS feature ID: 2584977

Grays River is a census-designated place (CDP) in Wahkiakum County, Washington. Grays River stands on the north bank of the lower Grays River, which flows into the Columbia River Estuary. As of the 2020 census, Grays River had a population of 248. The Grays River community is part of the Naselle-Grays River Valley School District, a K-12 school district of about 670 students.

The National Register of Historic Places-listed Grays River Covered Bridge crosses the Grays River in the community. It is the only such bridge still in use in Washington.

== Geography ==
According to the United States Census Bureau, the Grays River CDP has a total area of 20.19 square miles (52.3 km^{2}), of which 20.13 square miles (52.1 km^{2}) of it is land and 0.07 square miles (0.18 km^{2}) of it (0.33%) is water.

== Climate ==
Grays River has a subtropical Mediterranean climate (Köppen Csb). The average temperature for the year in Grays River is 50.2 °F (10.1 °C). The warmest month, on average, is August with an average temperature of 61.6 °F (16.4 °C). The coolest month on average is January, with an average temperature of 40.1 °F (4.5 °C). The highest recorded temperature in Grays River is 105 °F (41 °C), while the lowest recorded temperature is 2 °F (−17 °C).

Being that Grays River is located only 23 miles (37 km) from the coast and there are no significant hills or mountains between it and the coast, Grays River receives a great deal of precipitation. The average annual precipitation is 107.7 in (2,740 mm). Measurable precipitation falls on Grays River an average of 192 days a year. The most precipitation in one month was 35.2 in (890 mm). The maximum daily rainfall was 6.4 in (160 mm). Average annual snowfall is 4.9 inches (12.4 cm) with the average number of days with snow is 1.7. The highest monthly snowfall was 27 inches (69 cm).

Climate data for Grays River, Washington
Month	Jan	Feb	Mar	Apr	May	Jun	Jul	Aug	Sep	Oct	Nov	Dec	Year
Record high °F (°C)	65 (18)	74 (23)	81 (27)	88 (31)	97 (36)	100 (38)	105 (41)	105 (41)	101 (38)	87 (31)	72 (22)	66 (19)	105 (41)
Mean daily maximum °F (°C)	47.2 (8.4)	51.2 (10.7)	54.1 (12.3)	58.0 (14.4)	63.6 (17.6)	68.0 (20.0)	73.4 (23.0)	74.0 (23.3)	71.7 (22.1)	62.5 (16.9)	52.5 (11.4)	47.1 (8.4)	60.3 (15.7)
Mean daily minimum °F (°C)	33.1 (0.6)	33.6 (0.9)	35.0 (1.7)	37.4 (3.0)	42.0 (5.6)	46.4 (8.0)	49.5 (9.7)	49.3 (9.6)	45.5 (7.5)	40.2 (4.6)	36.6 (2.6)	33.9 (1.1)	40.2 (4.6)
Record low °F (°C)	4 (−16)	3 (−16)	19 (−7)	22 (−6)	29 (−2)	32 (0)	34 (1)	34 (1)	29 (−2)	22 (−6)	9 (−13)	2 (−17)	2 (−17)
Average precipitation inches (mm)	16.7 (420)	11.6 (290)	11.6 (290)	7.7 (200)	4.8 (120)	3.6 (91)	1.8 (46)	2.6 (66)	4.5 (110)	9.6 (240)	16.1 (410)	17.2 (440)	107.7 (2,740)
Average snowfall inches (cm)	2.2 (5.6)	0.9 (2.3)	0.2 (0.51)	0 (0)	0 (0)	0 (0)	0 (0)	0 (0)	0 (0)	0 (0)	0.6 (1.5)	1.0 (2.5)	4.9 (12)
Average precipitation days	21	18	21	19	16	13	8	8	10	16	21	21	192
Average snowy days	0.8	0.6	0	0	0	0	0	0	0	0	0.1	0.2	1.7
Source: WeatherBase

== Demographics ==
Historical population
Census	Pop.	Note	%±
2010	263		—
2020	248		−5.7%
U.S. Decennial Census; 2000 2010

Grays River first appeared as a census designated place in the 2010 U.S. census.

=== Racial and ethnic composition ===
Grays River CDP, Washington – Racial and ethnic composition Note: the US Census treats Hispanic/Latino as an ethnic category. This table excludes Latinos from the racial categories and assigns them to a separate category. Hispanics/Latinos may be of any race.
Race / Ethnicity (NH = Non-Hispanic)	Pop 2010	Pop 2020	% 2010	% 2020
White alone (NH)	243	217	92.40%	87.50%
Black or African American alone (NH)	1	3	0.38%	1.21%
Native American or Alaska Native alone (NH)	1	3	0.38%	1.21%
Asian alone (NH)	2	3	0.76%	1.21%
Native Hawaiian or Pacific Islander alone (NH)	0	0	0.00%	0.00%
Other race alone (NH)	3	0	1.14%	0.00%
Mixed race or Multiracial (NH)	6	15	2.28%	6.05%
Hispanic or Latino (any race)	7	7	2.66%	2.82%
Total	263	248	100.00%	100.00%

=== 2020 census ===
As of the 2020 census, there were 248 people, 135 housing units, and 104 families. The racial makeup was 218 White people, 3 African Americans, 3 Native Americans, 3 Asians, 0 Pacific Islanders, and 21 people from two or more races. 7 people were Hispanic or Latino.

The ancestry of Grays River was 14.5% English, 6.6% Irish, 3.5% German, and 2.6% Norwegian.

The median age in Grays River was 68.9 years old. 63.2% of the population were 65 or older, with 41.7% from 65 to 74 years, 8.8% from 75 to 84, and 12.7% were 85 or older.

The median household income was $54,048, families had $64,583, and non-families had $52,857. 0.0% of the population were in poverty.

=== 2010 census ===
As of the census of 2010, there were 263 people, 110 households, and 83 families residing in the CDP. The population density was 13.03 people per square mile (5.03 people/km^{2}). There were 128 housing units at an average density of 6.34 per square mile (2.45/km^{2}). The racial makeup of the CDP was 94.3% White, 0.4% African American, 0.4% Native American, 1.1% Asian, 0.0% Pacific Islander, 1.5% from other races, and 2.3% from two or more races. Hispanic or Latino of any race were 2.7% of the population.

There were 110 households, out of which 19.1% had children under the age of 18 living with them, 68.2% were married couples living together, 6.4% had a female householder with no husband present, and 24.5% were non-families. 20.9% of all households were made up of individuals, and 13.6% had someone living alone who was 65 years of age or older. The average household size was 2.39 and the average family size was 2.71.

In the CDP, the age distribution of the population shows 18.3% under the age of 18, 5.7% from 18 to 24, 13.3% from 25 to 44, 38.0% from 45 to 64, and 24.7% who were 65 years of age or older. The median age was 55.5 years. For every 100 females, there were 103.9 males. For every 100 females age 18 and over, there were 112.9 males.
