= Washington State Route 505 =

State highway in Washington, US

State Route 505

- Map of southwestern Washington with SR 505 highlighted in red

Route information
- Auxiliary route of I-5
- Maintained by WSDOT
- Length: 19.29 mi (31.04 km)
- Existed: 1991–present

Major junctions
- West end: Kerron Street in Winlock
- I-5 near Toledo
- East end: SR 504 near Toutle

Location
- Country: United States
- State: Washington
- Counties: Lewis, Cowlitz

Highway system
- State highways in Washington; Interstate; US; State; Scenic; Pre-1964; 1964 renumbering; Former
← SR 504	→ SR 506

State Route 505 (SR 505) is a short state highway in the U.S. state of Washington. It connects the towns of Winlock and Toledo to Interstate 5 (I-5) and SR 504.

== Route description ==
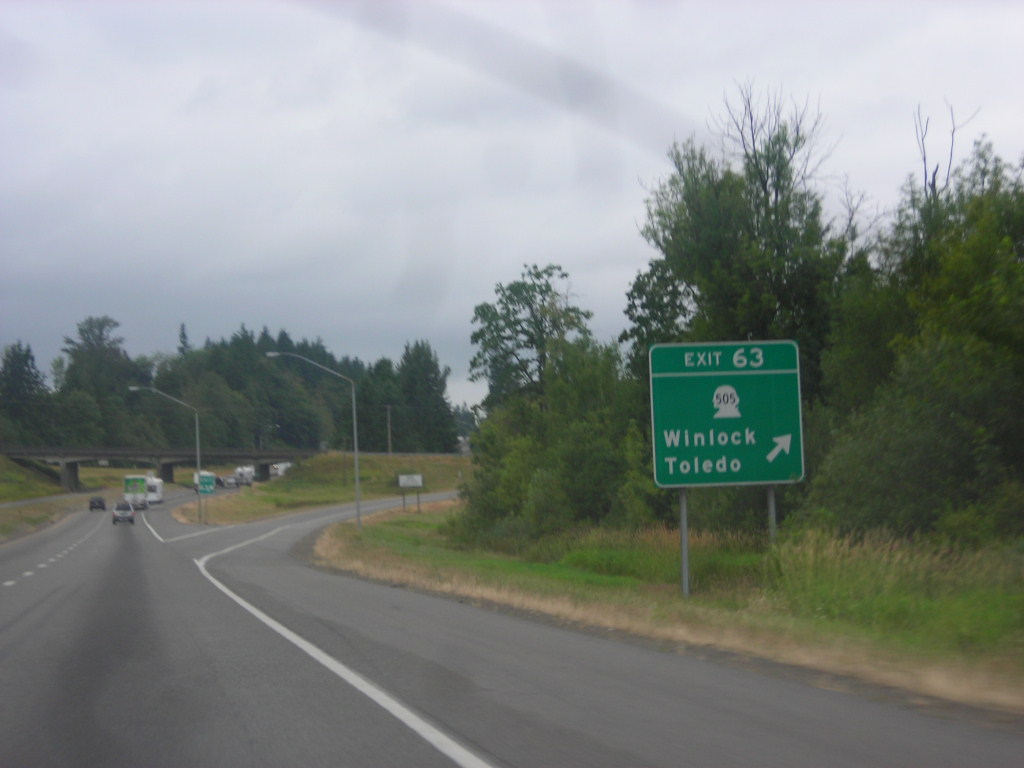
An exit from Interstate 5 for SR 505 near Toledo

SR 505 begins at the intersection of Kerron Street and Walnut Street in downtown Winlock, on the east side of Olequa Creek. Kerron Street, once part of SR 603, continues north towards Napavine and south to Vader along the Seattle Subdivision of the BNSF Railway. Walnut Street crosses over the double-tracked railroad and leaves downtown, traveling around a hill with the city's cemetery. The highway travels southeast and passes two small suburban subdivisions before turning on Cemetery Road. SR 505 continues southeast across the rural Grand Prairie to an interchange with Interstate 5 (I-5) at Pikes Hill.

From the interchange, the highway descends into the Cowlitz Prairie, turning south at a junction with Jackson Highway and reaching Toledo. SR 505 runs southeasterly through the city's street grid and turns east onto Cowlitz Street before crossing the Cowlitz River. The highway travels east across the forested Layton Prairie towards the Wilkes Hills, which SR 505 crosses via two narrow north–south passes. The highway continues south and descends from the hills, terminating at a junction with SR 504 (the Spirit Lake Highway) along the north bank of the North Fork Toutle River near Toutle.

SR 505 is maintained by the Washington State Department of Transportation (WSDOT), which conducts an annual survey on state highways to measure traffic volume in terms of annual average daily traffic. Average traffic volumes on the highway in 2016 ranged from a minimum of 470 vehicles at its eastern terminus to a maximum of 5,200 vehicles in downtown Toledo. SR 505 was also designated as a state scenic byway by the legislature in 1993.

== History ==
Until 1992, SR 505 from I-5 west to Winlock was part of State Route 603, which continued north from Winlock through Napavine to SR 6 about two miles (3 km) west of I-5 in Chehalis. Several changes were made to the state highways throughout Washington in 1992, and at that time the section from SR 6 to Winlock was turned back to the county, while the rest became a part of a realignment of SR 505. Until that time, SR 505 began at an interchange with I-5 and SR 506 west of Toledo. The county road is still signed "Highway 603" from SR 6 to Winlock even though it is no longer part of the state highway system.

The Cowlitz River Bridge in Toledo was rebuilt in 1994.

== Major intersections ==
County	Location	mi	km	Destinations	Notes
Lewis	Winlock	0.00	0.00	Kerron Street	Western terminus; former SR 603
Lewis		2.96	4.76	I-5 – Seattle, Portland	
Lewis	Toledo	6.32	10.17	Ash Street	Former SR 505
Cowlitz		19.29	31.04	SR 504 – Toutle, Mount St. Helens	Eastern terminus
1.000 mi = 1.609 km; 1.000 km = 0.621 mi
