= Washington State Route 506 =

State highway in Washington, US

State Route 506

- SR 506 highlighted in red on a map of southwestern Washington.

Route information
- Auxiliary route of I-5
- Maintained by WSDOT
- Length: 11.53 mi (18.56 km)
- Existed: 1964–present

Major junctions
- West end: 2nd Street in Ryderwood
- I-5 southbound near Vader
- East end: I-5 near Toledo

Location
- Country: United States
- State: Washington
- Counties: Cowlitz, Lewis

Highway system
- State highways in Washington; Interstate; US; State; Scenic; Pre-1964; 1964 renumbering; Former
| ← SR 505 | → SR 507 |

State Route 506 (SR 506) is an 11.53-mile (18.56 km) long state highway in Cowlitz and Lewis counties, part of the U.S. state of Washington, serving the communities of Ryderwood and Vader. SR 506 begins at the intersection of 2nd and Morse Street in Ryderwood, a community in Cowlitz County, traveling north into Lewis County and turning east past Vader to parallel the Cowlitz River and interchange Interstate 5 (I-5) twice west of Toledo. Originating as Secondary State Highway 1P (SSH 1P) in 1937, the highway was designated in its current form in 1964 and it shared its eastern terminus with SR 505. SR 411 terminated at Vader and both SR 411 and SR 505 were moved away from SR 506 in 1991.

== Route description ==
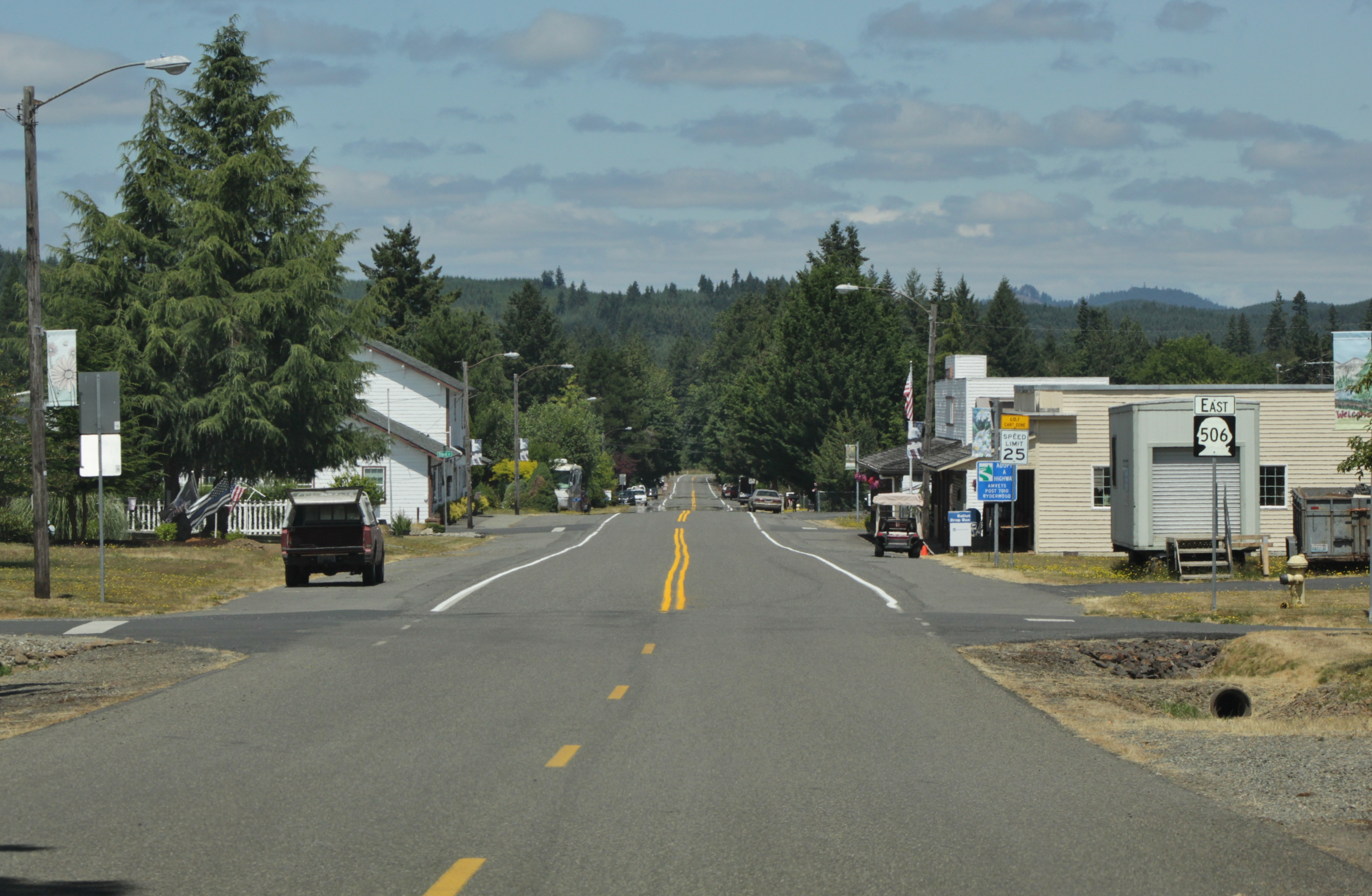
SR 506 at its western terminus in Ryderwood

SR 506 begins as the continuation of Morse Street at the Second Street intersection in Ryderwood, a community located in the Campbell Creek valley in northern Cowlitz County. Traveling north to exit Ryderwood, the highway crosses Campbell Creek and enters Lewis County. The roadway parallels Stillwater Creek in its valley northeast and turns east to cross the creek into Vader. The street is named 7th Street after crossing Olequa Creek; SR 506 crosses a railroad track owned by BNSF Railway and used by two Amtrak services, the Cascades and Coast Starlight, between the Kelso and Centralia stations. Traveling east through Vader, 7th Street intersects the West Side Highway, formerly SR 411 until 1991, and leaves the city heading northeast, paralleling the Cowlitz River, to cross Lacamas Creek, the busiest segment of the highway at a daily average of 1,800 vehicles in 2008. The roadway crosses Bear Creek near its confluence with the Cowlitz River and interchanges Interstate 5 (I-5) southbound exit 59; the route turns north to interchange I-5 again at exit 60 in a full diamond interchange. Exit 60 is also the western terminus of the Toledo-Vader Road, formerly SR 505 until 1991.

== History ==
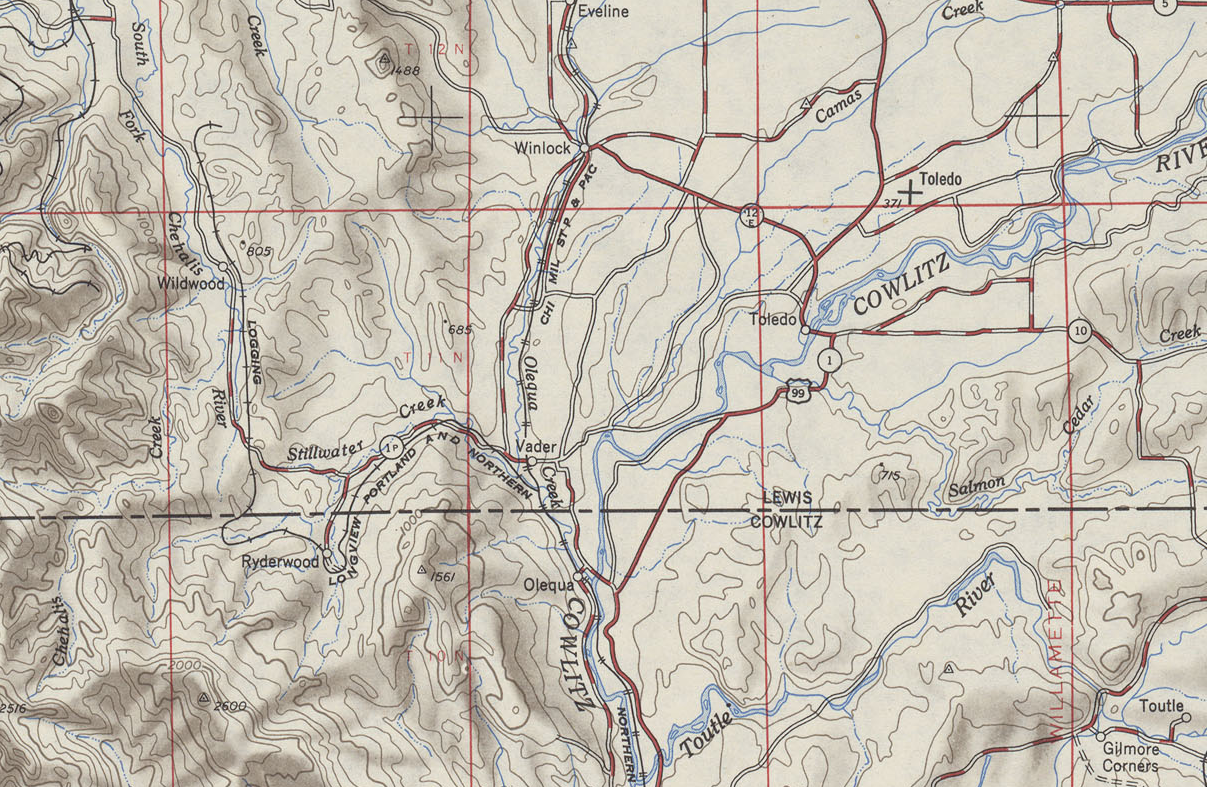
The predecessor to SR 506, Secondary State Highway 1P (SSH 1P), pictured in a topographic map paralleling the Longview, Portland and Northern Railway in 1951.

SR 506 was established in 1964, but was preceded by Secondary State Highway 1P (SSH 1P), established in 1937. Originally, SSH 1P traveled from Ryderwood, paralleling the Longview, Portland and Northern Railway line to Vader and paralleling the Cowlitz River to U.S. Route 99 (US 99) in Toledo. The rail line, established in 1922 by Longview's founder, Robert A. Long, was completed in 1929. In 1953, the rail line was removed, and in 1963, SSH 1P was shortened and moved west to the newer US 99 freeway, later Interstate 5 (I-5).

During the 1964 highway renumbering, SR 506 was created, SR 411 ended in Vader and SR 505 ended at the I-5 / SR 506 interchange. An extension of the highway connecting Vader to SR 407 near Cathlamet was studied by the state legislature in 1973 but was not recommended for construction.

In 1991, SR 411 was moved south to end in Castle Rock and SR 505 was moved onto former SR 603 to Winlock. The Washington State Transportation Improvement Board heard proposals in the early 1990s to decommission SR 506 and transfer control of the highway to the counties and local governments, which was opposed by residents due to high maintenance costs. The board ultimately decided in 1992 to recommend that the highway remain under state control.

The overpass carrying SR 506 over I-5 was closed on July 6, 2021, after a truck struck it and caused major structural damage. Governor Jay Inslee declared a state of emergency and approved funds to replace the entire bridge. The replacement is scheduled to be completed in late 2022.

== Major intersections ==
| County | Location | mi | km | Destinations | Notes |
|---|---|---|---|---|---|
| Cowlitz | Ryderwood | 0.00 | 0.00 | 2nd Street | Western terminus; continues south as Morse Street |
| Lewis | Vader | 6.85 | 11.02 | Westside Highway – Castle Rock, Kelso | Former northern terminus of SR 411 |
| Lewis | | 9.89 | 15.92 | I-5 – Seattle, Toledo, Portland, OR | Southbound only; exit 59 |
| Lewis | | 11.53 | 18.56 | I-5 – Kelso | Eastern terminus; exit 60; continues east as Toledo-Vader Road (former SR 505) |
1.000 mi = 1.609 km; 1.000 km = 0.621 mi
