= Rose Valley =

Rose Valley may refer to:

- Rose Valley, Antigua and Barbuda, now known as Christian Valley
- Rose Valley, Bulgaria
- Rose Valley, Saskatchewan, Canada
- Rose Valley, Chişinău, Moldova
- Rose Valley, Pennsylvania, United States
- Rose Valley, Washington, United States
