= Sandy Bend, Washington =

Unincorporated community in Washington, United States

- Unincorporated community
- Location in the state of Washington Sandy Bend (the United States)
- Coordinates: 46°14′26″N 122°54′50″W
- Country: United States
- State: Washington
- County: Cowlitz
- Elevation: 171 ft (52 m)
- Time zone: UTC−8 (PST)
  - Summer (DST): UTC−7 (PDT)
- ZIP Code: 98611
- Area code(s): 360, 564
- GNIS feature ID: 1512867

Sandy Bend is an unincorporated community in Cowlitz County, Washington, south of the city of Castle Rock, west of Washington State Route 411, and to the west of the Cowlitz River. Sandy Bend is located along or near Sandy Bend Road between Castle Rock and West Side Highway. The Sandy Bend community is part of the Castle Rock School District, a K-12 school district of about 1,300 students.
