= Beacon Hill, Cowlitz County, Washington =

Beacon Hill, Washington
- Census-designated place
- Location within Washington (state) Location within the United States
- Coordinates: 46°10′37″N 122°55′25″W
- Country: United States
- State: Washington
- County: Cowlitz

Area
  - Total: 1.19 sq mi (3.07 km^{2})
  - Land: 1.15 sq mi (2.98 km^{2})
  - Water: 0.035 sq mi (0.09 km^{2})
- Elevation: 262 ft (80 m)

Population (2020)
  - Total: 2,211
- Time zone: UTC-8 (Pacific (PST))
  - Summer (DST): UTC-7 (PDT)
- ZIP Codes: 98632 (Longview); 98626 (Kelso)
- Area code(s): 360, 564
- FIPS code: 53-04825
- GNIS feature ID: 2807174

Beacon Hill is an unincorporated community and census-designated place (CDP) in Cowlitz County, Washington, United States. As of the 2020 census, it had a population of 2,211. During the 2010 census, Beacon Hill was part of the West Side Highway CDP.

The CDP is in the western part of the county and is bordered to the south and west by Longview Heights, to the northeast by Lexington, and to the east by the Cowlitz River. State Route 411 runs through the east side of the community, following the Cowlitz. It leads south 3 miles (5 km) to Longview and north 9 miles (14 km) to Castle Rock.

== Demographics ==
Historical population
Census	Pop.	Note	%±
2020	2,211		—
U.S. Decennial Census

Beacon Hill first appeared as a census designated place in the 2020 U.S. census.

=== Racial and ethnic composition ===
Beacon Hill CDP, Washington – Racial and ethnic composition Note: the US Census treats Hispanic/Latino as an ethnic category. This table excludes Latinos from the racial categories and assigns them to a separate category. Hispanics/Latinos may be of any race.
Race / Ethnicity (NH = Non-Hispanic)	Pop 2020	2020
White alone (NH)	1,753	79.29%
Black or African American alone (NH)	27	1.22%
Native American or Alaska Native alone (NH)	15	0.68%
Asian alone (NH)	42	1.90%
Native Hawaiian or Pacific Islander alone (NH)	7	0.32%
Other race alone (NH)	9	0.41%
Mixed race or Multiracial (NH)	125	5.65%
Hispanic or Latino (any race)	233	10.54%
Total	2,211	100.00%

=== 2020 census ===
As of the 2020 census, there were 2,211 people, 796 housing units, and 585 families in the CDP.

The ancestry of the CDP was 14.8% English, 13.6% Irish, 6.5% Dutch, 6.1% German, 4.5% West Indian, and 2.5% Norwegian.

The median age was 31.1 years old. 17.1% of the population was 65 or older, with 8.4% between 65 and 74, 7.6% between 75 and 84, and 1.1% were 85 or older. 29.1% of the population were under 18, with 7.5% under 5 years, 20.4% between the ages of 5 and 14, and 1.1% between the ages of 15 and 17.

The median household income was $89,464, with families having $96,847, and married couples having $112,067. 13.7% of the population were in poverty.
