= Columbia and Cowlitz Railway =

Railway line in and around Longview, WA

Overview
- Headquarters: Longview, Washington
- Reporting mark: CLC
- Locale: Washington
- Dates of operation: 1925–

Technical
- Track gauge: 4 ft 8 1/2 in (1,435 mm) standard gauge
- Length: 8.5 miles (13.7 km)

The Columbia and Cowlitz Railway (reporting mark CLC) is a short-line railroad owned by Patriot Rail Corporation, and is headquartered in Longview, Washington. The railroad serves an 8.5 miles (13.7 km) route from the Weyerhaeuser Company mill in Longview to the junction just outside the city limits of Kelso. From there, traffic is either switched to the Patriot Woods Railroad, formally known as the Weyerhaeuser Woods Railroad, where it is transported to Weyerhaeuser's Green Mountain Sawmill at Toutle or it is switched to the BNSF/Union Pacific joint main line for movement to either Portland, Oregon, or Seattle, Washington.

The railroad employs thirteen people and hauls around 12,000 carloads a year.

== History ==
CLC was incorporated on April 9, 1925, and the line was constructed between 1926 and 1928. The railway was a wholly owned subsidiary of Weyerhaeuser Company until its sale in 2010 to Patriot Rails. Patriot also purchased the Weyerhauser Woods Railroad, changing its name to Patriot Woods Railroad. The two railroads connect and work as one railroad with 37 miles (60 km) of track.

== Rolling stock ==
The railway owns a fleet of 500 freight cars including a mix of boxcars, centerbeam lumber cars, and flat cars. The Railroad utilizes seven locomotives.

All CLC freight cars are painted a navy blue color with white lettering, although some have worn a mineral red color, and the CLC's locomotives are painted navy blue with white lettering and white pinstripes across the top quarter of the bodies and across the frame sill. However, in times past, some of the locomotives also wore Weyerhaeuser's color scheme of yellow and black. The lone caboose is painted safety yellow with black lettering, Weyerhaeuser colors, and seems to be one of Weyerhaeuser's old cabooses, most likely either #1 or #2. A signature safety feature of CLC's locomotives is the blue strobe light on the roof of the locomotives. CLC chooses blue as their safety light color because of the large number of yellow and red flashing safety lights around the Weyerhaeuser mill in Longview.

== Commodities and customers ==
The main commodities transported along the rails are newsprint, plywood chips, pulpboard, industrial waste and chemicals. Companies using the railroad services are Weyerhaeuser, Georgia-Pacific, NORPAC Foods Inc, Flexible Foam, Equa-Chlor, PPG Industries, Canexus and Solvay Chemicals.
