= Lexington, Washington =

- Census-designated place
- Location within Washington (state) Location within the United States
- Coordinates: 46.189403°N 122.912611°W
- Country: United States
- State: Washington
- County: Cowlitz

Area
  - Total: 1.432 sq mi (3.709 km^{2})
  - Land: 1.339 sq mi (3.468 km^{2})
  - Water: 0.093 sq mi (0.241 km^{2}) 6.49%
- Elevation: 33 ft (10 m)

Population (2020)
  - Total: 3,834
  - Density: 2,864.6/sq mi (1,106.01/km^{2})
- Time zone: UTC–8 (Pacific (PST))
  - Summer (DST): UTC–7 (PDT)
- ZIP Code: 98626 (Kelso)
- Area codes: 360 and 564
- FIPS code: 53-39230
- GNIS feature ID: 2805103

Lexington is a census-designated place (CDP) in Cowlitz County, Washington, United States. The population was 3,834 at the 2020 census. During the 2010 census, Lexington was part of the West Side Highway CDP.

The CDP is in the western part of the county and is bordered to the southwest by Beacon Hill and to the east by the Cowlitz River. State Route 411 runs through the community, following the Cowlitz. It leads south 4 miles (6 km) to Longview and north 8 miles (13 km) to Castle Rock.

== Geography ==
According to the United States Census Bureau, the CDP has a total area of 1.432 square miles (3.71 km^{2}), of which 1.339 square miles (3.47 km^{2}) is land and 0.093 square miles (0.24 km^{2}) (6.49%) is water.

== Demographics ==
Historical population
Census	Pop.	Note	%±
2020	3,834		—
U.S. Decennial Census; 2020 Census

Lexington first appeared as a census designated place in the 2020 U.S. census.

The top five reported ancestries (people were allowed to report up to two ancestries, thus the figures will generally add to more than 100%) were English (94.2), Spanish (0.0%), Other Indo-European (0.0%), Asian and Pacific Islander (5.8%), and Other (0.0%).

The median age in the CDP was 41.9 years.

=== Racial and ethnic composition ===
Lexington CDP, Washington – Racial and ethnic composition Note: the US Census treats Hispanic/Latino as an ethnic category. This table excludes Latinos from the racial categories and assigns them to a separate category. Hispanics/Latinos may be of any race.
Race / Ethnicity (NH = Non-Hispanic)	Pop 2020	2020
White alone (NH)	3,018	78.72%
Black or African American alone (NH)	11	0.29%
Native American or Alaska Native alone (NH)	39	1.02%
Asian alone (NH)	92	2.40%
Native Hawaiian or Pacific Islander alone (NH)	15	0.39%
Other race alone (NH)	16	0.42%
Mixed race or Multiracial (NH)	240	6.26%
Hispanic or Latino (any race)	403	10.51%
Total	3,834	100.00%

=== 2020 census ===
As of the 2020 census, there were 3,834 people, 1,385 households, and 998 families residing in the CDP. The population density was 2,863.33 inhabitants per square mile (1,105.5/km^{2}). There were 1,427 housing units at an average density of 1,065.72 per square mile (411.5/km^{2}). The racial makeup of the CDP was 81.53% White, 0.37% African American, 1.25% Native American, 2.43% Asian, 0.52% Pacific Islander, 3.73% from some other races and 10.17% from two or more races. Hispanic or Latino people of any race were 10.51% of the population.
