= Pleasant Hill, Washington =

Unincorporated community in Washington, United States

- Unincorporated community
- Location in the state of Washington Pleasant Hill (the United States)
- Coordinates: 46°13′31″N 122°53′38″W
- Country: United States
- State: Washington
- County: Cowlitz
- Elevation: 112 ft (34 m)
- Time zone: UTC−8 (PST)
  - Summer (DST): UTC−7 (PDT)
- ZIP Code: 98626
- Area code(s): 360, 564
- FIPS code: 53-54710
- GNIS feature ID: 1512568

Pleasant Hill is an unincorporated community in Cowlitz County, Washington, south of the city of Castle Rock. Pleasant Hill is located along or near Pleasant Hill Road between Castle Rock and Ostrander. The northern end of Pleasant Hill community is part of the Castle Rock School District, while the southern end is part of the Kelso School District.
