= Grace Evangelical Church of Vader =

Historic church in Washington, United States

- U.S. National Register of Historic Places
- Washington State Heritage Register
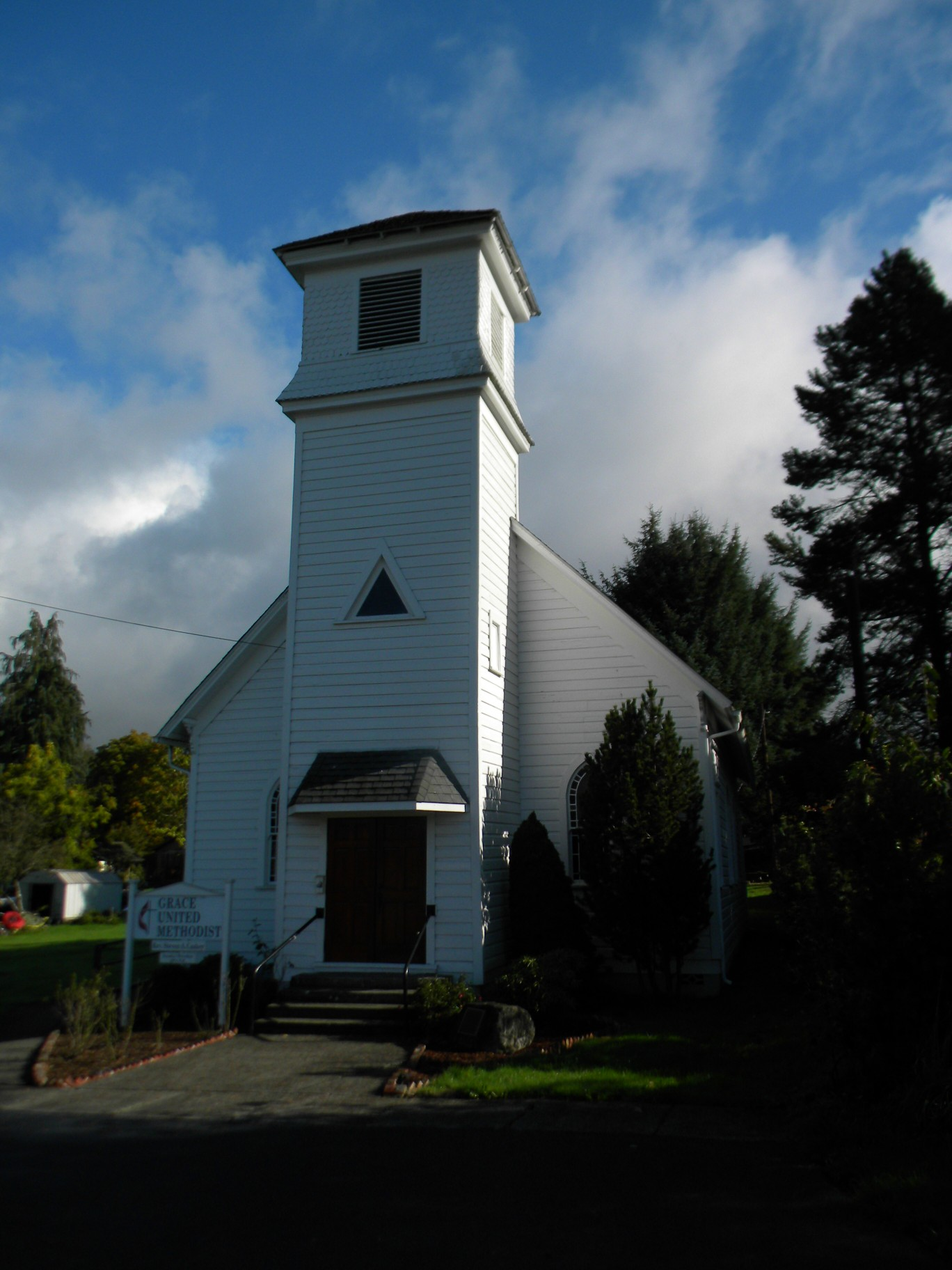
- Grace Evangelical Church of Vader, 2014

- Location within Washington (state)
- Location: 618 D Street, Vader, Washington
- Coordinates: 46°24′8″N 122°57′16″W
- Area: less than one acre
- Built: 1902
- Architect: Jack Arnold, Pat Hitchcock
- Architectural style: Gothic
- NRHP reference No.: 03000162

Significant dates
- Added to NRHP: March 28, 2003
- Designated WSHR: January 2003

Grace Evangelical Church of Vader, also known as Grace United Methodist Church of Vader, is a historic Methodist church in Vader, Washington. Added to the National Register of Historic Places (NRHP) in 2003, the church is one of two NRHP-listed sites in the city, along with the Ben Olsen House. The church and congregation have undergone several name changes due to mergers between religious affiliations and districts. The most widely used, and current name, Grace United Methodist Church of Vader, has been in existence since 1969.

After residents in what was then known as Little Falls formed an Evangelical mission in 1891, the Late Victorian Gothic church was constructed by local craftsmen in 1902. The land was donated, with the express condition the grounds be used to build a house of worship. Open to parishioners of various cultures and heritages, the structure was often too small to accommodate crowds attending services; an annex was built in the 1930s to alleviate the issue.

At the time of its national historic designation, the structure was considered slightly altered but remaining mostly true to the overall historic footprint and style of the church. A belfry, altered from remodeling efforts during the Great Depression, is located on the façade and contains an original cast iron bell. Stained glass windows in Gothic style provide light to the sanctuary that features beaver board ceilings and walls. The interior also includes a balcony, a classroom, narthex, and vestibule.

Religious services have remained uninterrupted since the church was built. Grace United Methodist Church of Vader is considered as possibly one of the last remaining buildings in Vader that was constructed at the dawn of the 20th century.

== History ==
The congregation began in 1891 as an Evangelical mission under a Winlock district when the town of Vader was known as Little Falls; the first pastor was Reverend T.T. Vincent. In 1892, the ministry was known as the "Little Falls Charge". Land upon which the Grace Evangelical Church is situated was donated in 1902 by the town's Washington Clay Fire Company for $1.00. The deed required the grounds, comprising three lots, be "kept, used, and maintained" only as a "place of divine worship". In need of additional space to build a church, a fourth parcel was further donated by congregation members of the Kendall family.

The Gothic-style Grace Evangelical Church was constructed in 1902. A 2-story parsonage was built in 1906 but was "structurally unstable" and was demolished in the 1960s. The city grew quickly and services at the church were often overflowing, with worshippers standing outside the front entrance. The church became a focal point in the community and the congregation was composed of various cultural groups, including people of German, Finnish, and Italian heritage. The house of worship was often used during times of war as the community organized medical supplies and care packages for soldiers. A windstorm in October 1934 tore away large portions of the church roof.

The church was renamed in 1913 as Vader Mission of the Evangelical Association. Due to various downturns in the city's economy and a waning population beginning in 1914 after the loss of a major sawmill facility due to fire, the church was renamed multiple times under several mergers, such as in 1922 as the Evangelical Church, and once more in 1946 as the Evangelical United Brethren Church. The title remained until 1968, becoming the United Methodist Church. On July 10, 1969, the congregation and church were incorporated under the current name, Grace United Methodist Church of Vader.

At the 100th anniversary of the church, the congregation was noted to have been in continuous ministerial existence since its inception. The festivities coincided with an annual tradition known as "Homecoming and Hymnsinging Sunday" that had begun in 1991. Grace United Methodist Church of Vader has been considered as one of the last known remaining structures in the town constructed at the turn of the 20th century.

== Geography ==
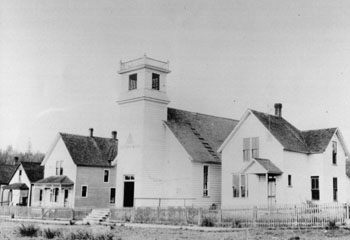
Grace Evangelical Church of Vader, c. 1900s

The church is located a block north of State Route 506 at 618 D Street in Vader, Washington. The area, once the original residential section of the community, used to be populated with Victorian-style two and three story homes constructed in the late 1800s and early 20th century. The structure faces west and sits upon four lots combining to form a 100 ft × 100 ft (30 m × 30 m) square parcel.

== Architecture and features ==
Unless otherwise noted, the details provided are based on the 2003 National Register of Historic Places (NRHP) nomination form and may not reflect updates or changes to the Grace Evangelical Church of Vader in the interim.

Constructed under the credit of congregation members Jack Arnold and Pat Hitchcock, the architectural style of the church was listed by the NRHP to be Late Victorian Gothic. The church's dimensions are 31 ft × 51 ft (9.4 m × 15.5 m), 16 feet (4.9 m) tall at the eaves, and 40 feet (12.2 m) to the gable peak. The building is supported by a concrete block foundation that was added in 1975 by the Vancouver District Builders Club of the United Methodist Church. (Note: The year the concrete foundation was added, as reported by the NRHP form, differs from a building permit report in 1977 by the Centralia Daily Chronicle.)

The building, according to the Washington State Heritage Register's record of the church, was considered at the time of the nomination to have had "slight" alterations and the footprint changed enough to be classified as "moderate".

=== Exterior ===
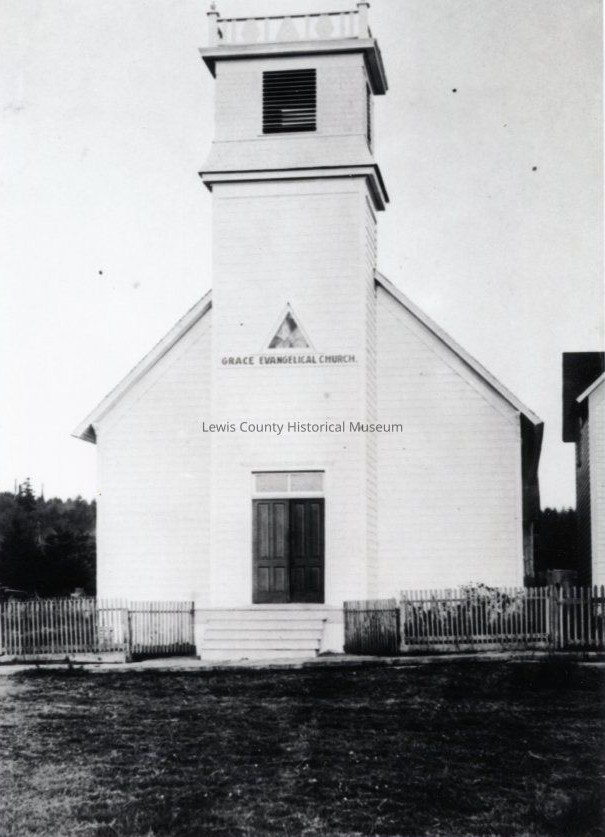
Grace Evangelical Church of Vader, c. 1905

The white-painted church was cladded in "horizontal drop weatherboard" and has a predominant front-facing gable façade with two, trefoil designed scrolled brackets at the eaves. The main feature of the front entrance is an 8 ft × 11 ft (2.4 m × 3.4 m) centered 50 foot (15 metres) tall steeple and a mansard-styled belfry. The steeple contains four, rectangular louvers, allowing the ringing church bells to "project across the community". A triangular rose window sits just below the belfry. The bell enclosure's hip roof, a remodel from the 1930s, is detailed in fish scale shingles. The belfry originally had a flat roof with a decorative, flat-sawn timber balustrade with Grecian urn and triangle-designs above the cornice.

The six-panel front door set is reached by a four-step wooden stairway. A shallow hip roof over the entrance, built in the early 1980s, hides an original two-pane transom window.

Two Gothic arch-style, stained glass windows flank the steeple. Not maiden to the church, the casements were added during the 1930s; the façade was originally windowless. The north face features four, four-paned glass windows. The southern wall contains four stained glass windows; two of the center casements feature an arched top with a fanned lead glass pattern with a bottom portion in an Arts and Crafts-style layout, similar to the flanking windows. The windows may not be original to the church as older photographs show taller and narrower four-over-four, clear glass sashes.

A 31 ft × 25 ft (9.4 m × 7.6 m) annex was built during a necessary expansion in the 1930s to help accommodate a growing congregation, which had often had to attend crowded services by standing outside the church. With a gable roof and a protruding brick chimney, the annex features horizontal siding and a pair of two-over-two double hung windows. A 7 ft × 25 ft (2.1 m × 7.6 m) bathroom storage area with a shed roof and two small, square four-pane windows, is attached to the annex. A wheelchair ramp was added to the annex in 1999.

=== Interior ===
A 7 ft × 11 ft (2.1 m × 3.4 m) vestibule is located at the main entrance; a 9 ft × 11 ft (2.7 m × 3.4 m) narthex, used at the time of the NRHP nomination as a cloakroom is accessed off the space through a set of double doors. Both areas are original to the church and feature wainscot beadboard. Located off the narthex are two rooms. A 8 ft × 9 ft (2.4 m × 2.7 m) office for the pastor is situated on the north side with a 9 ft × 10 ft (2.7 m × 3.0 m) meeting room on the opposite side of the entrance space. A braided cord in the vestibule allows the ringing of the church bell.

A 9 ft × 29 ft (2.7 m × 8.8 m) enclosed balcony rests above the narthex space and includes original, theater-style folding chairs made of metal and wood. Accessed via a small, 2 foot (0.61 metres)-wide dog leg staircase from the pastor's office, an operable partition wall allows visitors to view the sanctuary from above. The stairwell also leads to the attic and belfry. Housed inside the bell tower is the church's original 32 in (81 cm) cast iron bell, manufactured by C.S. Bell Company of Hillsboro, Ohio.

A single door from the entrance space leads to a 25 ft × 51 ft (7.6 m × 15.5 m) sanctuary that features a partially angled ceiling, peaking at 35 feet (10.7 m) in height. The nave contains beaver board ceilings and walls, a continuation beadboard paneling, and hardwood floors. The space features wood pews, only one of which was considered original at the church's 125th anniversary in 2016. (Note: The last remaining pew contains carved initials of two "youngsters". The youths were forced to mow the lawn of the church grounds for several years as punishment for the defacement.) The sanctuary is lighted by three stained glass windows. The altar area is slightly raised. A partitioned space once used for classes is located on the left side of the sanctuary; the partition and a pocket wall divides the sanctuary from a small classroom and the 1994 wheelchair accessible bathroom.

A bathroom and the 25 ft × 31 ft (7.6 m × 9.4 m) annex, known as a fellowship hall by the 2000s, are accessed by a hallway. The annex space features a full kitchen and dining space with fir flooring, 4 foot (1.2 metres)-tall cedar wainscotting, and beaver board similar to the sanctuary. On the back side of the annex, a 7 foot (2.1 metres)-wide storage area runs the length of the addition.

=== Renovations ===
During the Great Depression, a minister of the church at the time, Pastor Bergstresser, and local carpenter Emil Kemp, undertook several renovations of the building. Alterations included the removal of original details in the bell tower, installation of acoustical tiles in the sanctuary, and the replacement of windows. The foundation was rebuilt beginning in 1977. A larger restoration of the structure was begun in the early 2010s with attention on the belfry and the floors in the building. New stained glass windows were installed and the annex was updated.

== Tourism ==
In the 2000s, the church, along with the Ben Olsen House, was part of "An Old-Fashioned Christmas" celebration and tour held in the town.

== Significance ==
Grace Evangelical Church of Vader was added to the National Register of Historic Places (NRHP) on May 28, 2003. The NRHP nomination noted the church's representation of the "spiritual needs and aspirations of a small community in rural Washington State" as well as the building's Gothic-style accents and "rural Ecclesiastical architecture". The Grace Church is the only remaining house of worship in Vader dating from the turn of the 20th century. Prior to the national designation, the site was added to the Washington State Heritage Register by January 2003.
