= Sightly, Washington =

Unincorporated community in Washington, United States

- Unincorporated community
- Location in the state of Washington Sightly (the United States)
- Coordinates: 46°17′59″N 122°42′30″W
- Country: United States
- State: Washington
- County: Cowlitz
- Elevation: 692 ft (211 m)
- Time zone: UTC−8 (PST)
  - Summer (DST): UTC−7 (PDT)
- ZIP Code: 98649
- Area code(s): 360, 564
- FIPS code: 53-64155
- GNIS feature ID: 1511313

Sightly is an unincorporated community in Cowlitz County, Washington. Sightly is located east of the city of Castle Rock and east of Silver Lake. Sightly is reached by taking exit 49 off of Interstate 5, traveling 10.4 miles (16.7 km) east along Washington State Route 504, which is also known as the Spirit Lake Memorial Highway, and then traveling 2.4 miles (3.9 km) along Sightly Road. The Sightly community was given its name due to its views of Mount St. Helens. The Sightly community is part of the Toutle Lake School District, a K-12 school district of about 600 students.

Sightly is located 25.7 miles (41.4 km) northwest of Mount St. Helens. The eruption of Mount St. Helens on May 18, 1980, was the deadliest and most economically destructive volcanic event in the history of the United States.
