= Washington State Route 411 =

State highway in Cowlitz County, Washington, US

State Route 411

- Map of Cowlitz County in southwestern Washington with SR 411 highlighted in red

Route information
- Auxiliary route of SR 4
- Maintained by WSDOT
- Length: 13.48 mi (21.69 km)
- Existed: 1964–present

Major junctions
- South end: SR 432 in Longview
- SR 411 Spur in Kelso; I-5 BL in Castle Rock
- North end: I-5 / SR 504 / I-5 BL in Castle Rock

Location
- Country: United States
- State: Washington
- Counties: Cowlitz

Highway system
- State highways in Washington; Interstate; US; State; Scenic; Pre-1964; 1964 renumbering; Former
| ← SR 410 | → SR 432 |

State Route 411 (SR 411) is a 13.48-mile (21.69 km) state highway located in Cowlitz County in the U.S. state of Washington, serving Longview, Kelso, West Side Highway and Castle Rock. The roadway, which parallels the Cowlitz River and Interstate 5 (I-5), begins at an interchange with SR 432 in Longview and travels north past a spur route, under SR 4 and across the Cowlitz River to become concurrent with I-5 Business and end at an interchange with I-5, I-5 Business and SR 504 in Castle Rock. The road first appeared on a map in 1951 and originally signed as Secondary State Highway 12H (SSH 12H) in 1957, SR 411 was established in 1964 and ran from Kelso to Vader. In 1991, the highway was extended south to SR 432 in Longview, the former route becoming SR 411 Spur, and was shortened to I-5 / I-5 Business / SR 504 in Castle Rock.

== Route description ==
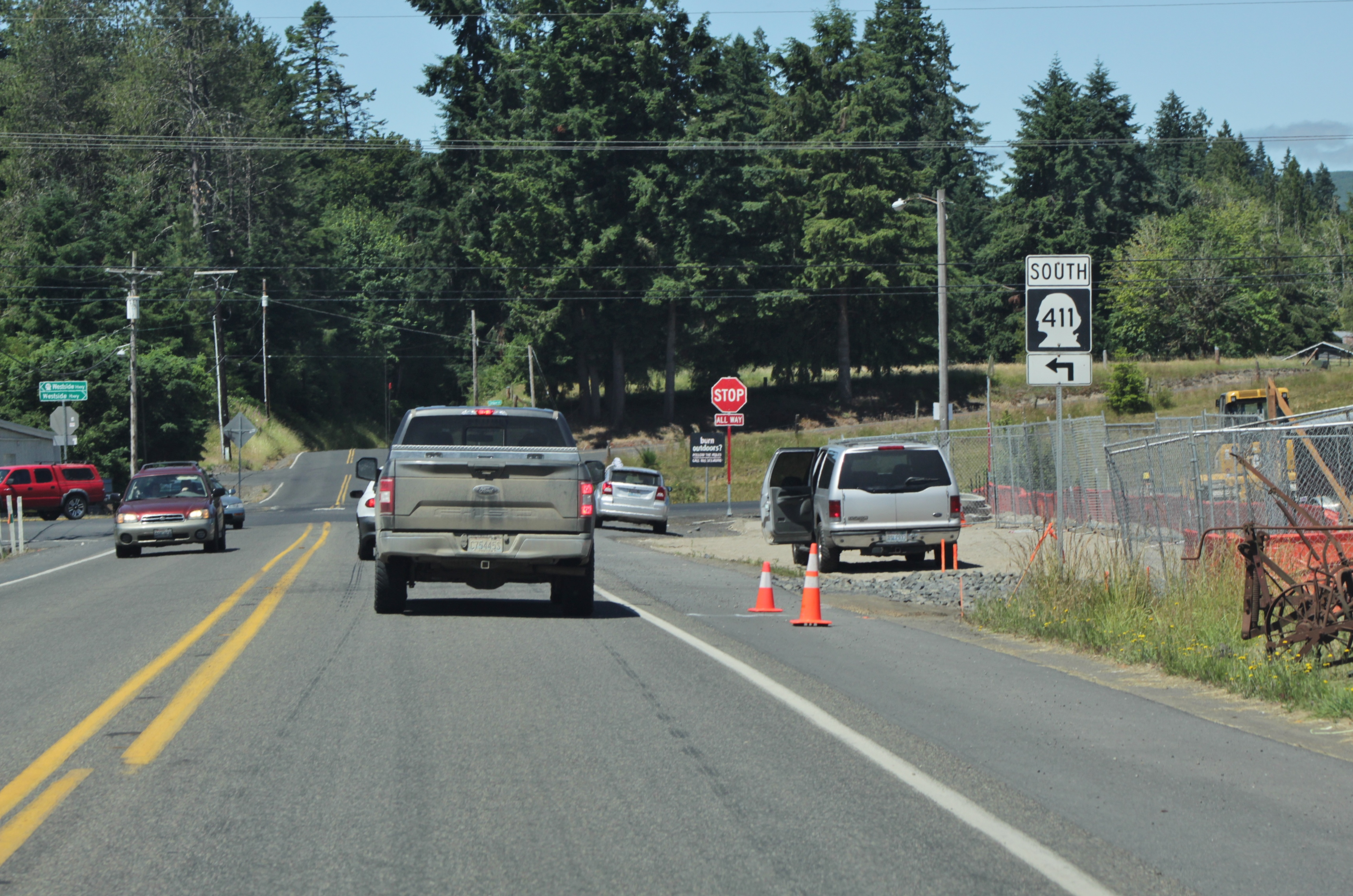
SR 411 southbound leaving Castle Rock

State Route 411 (SR 411) begins at a partial cloverleaf interchange with SR 432 in Longview, located northwest of the confluence of the Cowlitz and Columbia rivers. From the interchange, the highway travels north as 3rd Avenue to exit Longview and enter Kelso as First Avenue, where SR 411 Spur extends west from the main roadway to SR 4, which the road goes under after SR 4 travels across the Cowlitz River. After leaving Kelso and temporarily reenters Longview, SR 411 parallels the Cowlitz River, a BNSF Railway route, the Columbia and Cowlitz Railroad and Interstate 5 (I-5). After passing the community of West Side Highway, the highway turns east as PH No. 10 Road and crosses the Cowlitz River into Castle Rock. PH No. 10 Road becomes A Street and continues east to Huntington Avenue, signed as I-5 Business, where the roadway turns north, concurrent with I-5 Business, to end at a diamond interchange with I-5 and the western terminus of SR 504. The busiest segments of the road in 2007 were the SR 432 interchange in Longview, SR 411 Spur intersection in Kelso and the Alpha Drive intersection in West Side Highway, all with an estimated daily average of 17,000 motorists. The Nevada Drive junction in Kelso was the busiest segment in 1970, with an estimated daily average of 6,800 motorists.

== History ==
Secondary State Highway 12H (SSH 12H) was established in 1957 and ran from Kelso to Vader. During the 1964 highway renumbering, SSH 12H became SR 411, which ran from SR 4 in Kelso to SR 506 east of Vader.

Between 1964 and 1991, SR 411 was 9.46 miles (15.22 km) longer and extended north to Vader, a city in Lewis County. The former route started at an intersection with PH No. 10 Road west of Castle Rock and traveled north as the West Side Highway, paralleling a railroad, the Cowlitz River and I-5, into Lewis County to end at SR 506 east of Vader. Between Castle Rock and Vader, six different railroads have had ownership or usage rights that paralleled the former route. In the 1870s the Northern Pacific Railway, built the route. And by 1951, it was also in use by the Union Pacific and Great Northern Railway. By 1968, the Chicago, Milwaukee, St. Paul and Pacific Railroad had also been given usage rights, but as of 2008, the BNSF Railway (the corporate descendant of the Northern Pacific and Great Northern Railways) uses the railroad. The PH No. 10 Road intersection west of Castle Rock was the busiest segment of the Castle Rock to Vader route of SR 411 in 1970, with an estimated daily average of 2,350 motorists. The intersection was also the busiest segment in 1991, with an estimated daily average of 4,150 motorists.

In 1991, the highway was extended south to SR 432 in Longview, the older section becoming SR 411 Spur, and shortened north into Castle Rock and ending at Interstate 5 (I-5) and SR 504.

The state legislature renamed the section of SR 411 in unincorporated Cowlitz County to the Cowlitz County Deputy Sheriff Justin DeRosier Memorial Highway in 2023.

== Spur route ==
State Route 411 Spur
- Location: Kelso
- Existed: 1991–present

SR 411 has a spur route in Kelso, identified by the Washington State Department of Transportation (WSDOT) as SR 411 SP Kelso (SR 411 Spur) that extends 0.26 miles (0.42 km) west from SR 411 as West Main Street and north as 5th Avenue to SR 4. The busiest segment of the street is the SR 411 intersection, with an estimated daily average of 15,000 motorists in 2007. In 1970, the SR 4 intersection was the busiest, with an estimated daily average of 2,850 motorists. The highway was part of SR 411 from 1964 until 1991, when it was extended to SR 432.

The entire route is in Kelso, Cowlitz County.

| mi | km | Destinations | Notes |
|---|---|---|---|
| 0.00 | 0.00 | SR 411 (1st Avenue West) – Longview, West Side Highway, Castle Rock | |
| 0.26 | 0.42 | SR 4 (Cowlitz Way) – Longview, Cathlamet, Naselle | |
1.000 mi = 1.609 km; 1.000 km = 0.621 mi

== Major intersections ==
The entire route is in Cowlitz County.

| Location | mi | km | Destinations | Notes |
|---|---|---|---|---|
| Longview | 0.00 | 0.00 | SR 432 – Kelso, Cathlamet, Naselle | |
| Kelso | 1.67 | 2.69 | SR 411 Spur (West Main Street) to SR 4 – Longview, Cathlamet, Naselle | Former SR 411 |
| | 12.01 | 19.33 | To SR 506 / West Side Highway – Vader | Former SR 411 |
| Castle Rock | 12.74 | 20.50 | I-5 BL south (Huntington Avenue) to I-5 south – Vancouver, Portland, OR | South end of I-5 Business overlap |
| Castle Rock | 13.48 | 21.69 | I-5 north / SR 504 east (Spirit Lake Memorial Highway) / I-5 BL – Olympia, Chehalis, Toutle | North end of I-5 Business overlap |
1.000 mi = 1.609 km; 1.000 km = 0.621 mi: Concurrency terminus
