= Arnold Riegger =

American sports shooter

Personal information
- Born: July 8, 1920 Bothell, Washington, U.S.
- Died: July 6, 1996 (aged 75) Battle Ground, Washington, U.S.

Sport
- Sport: Sports shooting

Arnold Riegger (July 8, 1920 – July 6, 1996) was an American sports shooter. He competed in the trap event at the 1960 Summer Olympics.

Riegger was born in Bothell, Washington, and grew up in the small town of Ryderwood, Washington. He won three national championships in trap shooting and was inducted into the Amateur Trapshooting Hall of Fame in 1975. Riegger died on July 6, 1996, shortly before his 76th birthday, in Battle Ground, Washington.
