= Ryderwood, Washington =

- Census-designated place
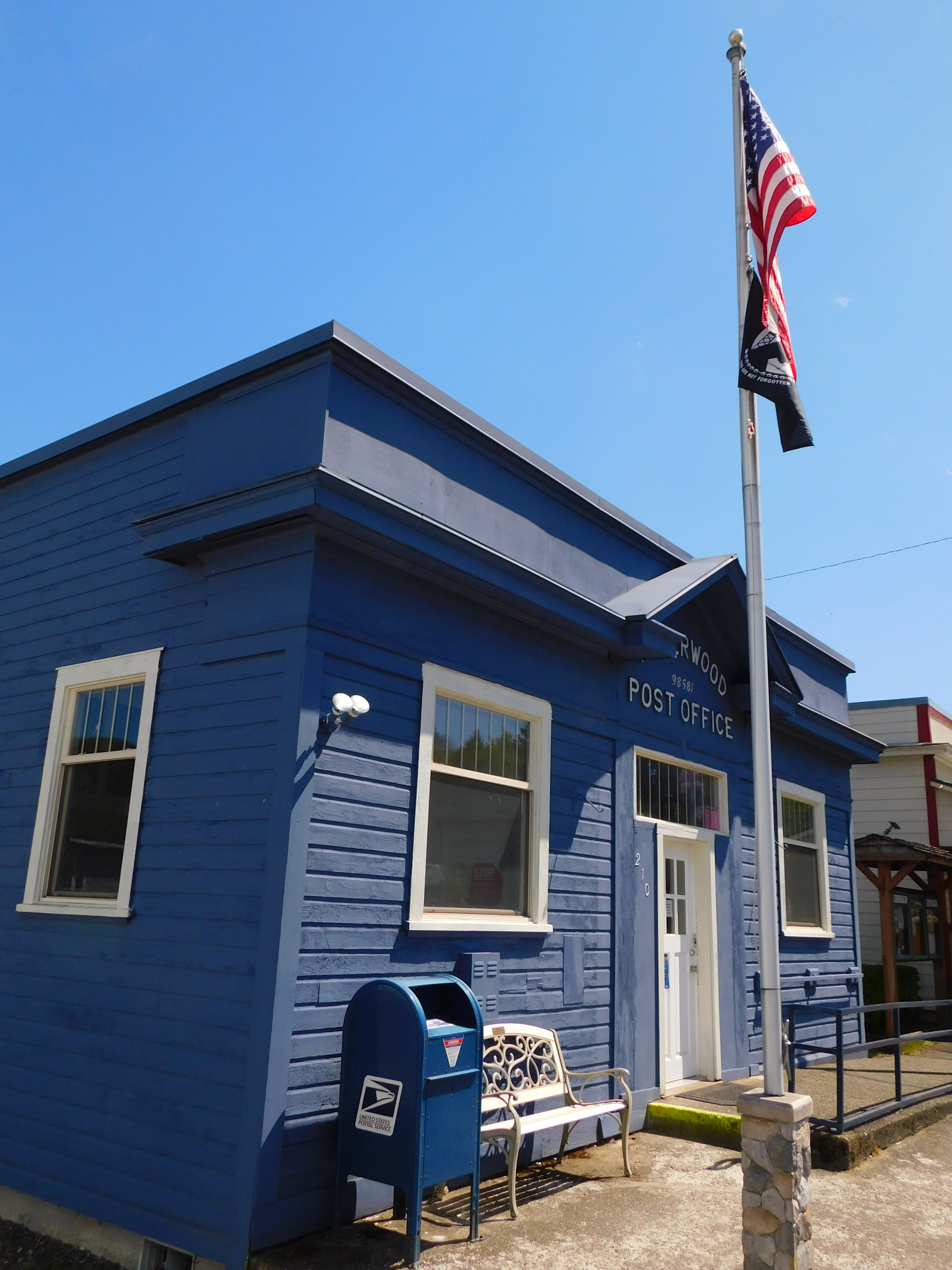
- Ryderwood Post Office, 2024

- Location in the state of Washington
- Coordinates: 46°22′33″N 123°02′40″W
- Country: United States
- State: Washington
- County: Cowlitz

Area
  - Total: 0.16 sq mi (0.42 km^{2})
  - Land: 0.16 sq mi (0.42 km^{2})
  - Water: 0 sq mi (0.0 km^{2})
- Elevation: 272 ft (83 m)

Population (2020)
  - Total: 383
  - Density: 2,400/sq mi (910/km^{2})
- Time zone: UTC−8 (PST)
  - Summer (DST): UTC−7 (PDT)
- ZIP Code: 98581
- Area code(s): 360, 564
- FIPS code: 53-60580
- GNIS feature ID: 2586746

Ryderwood is a census-designated place (CDP) in Cowlitz County, Washington, west of the city of Vader. Known locally as the "Village in the Woods", the town began in 1923 as a logging settlement and considered itself the "World's Largest Logging Town". Ryderwood became a retirement community in the 1950s. The population as of the 2020 census was 383.

== History ==
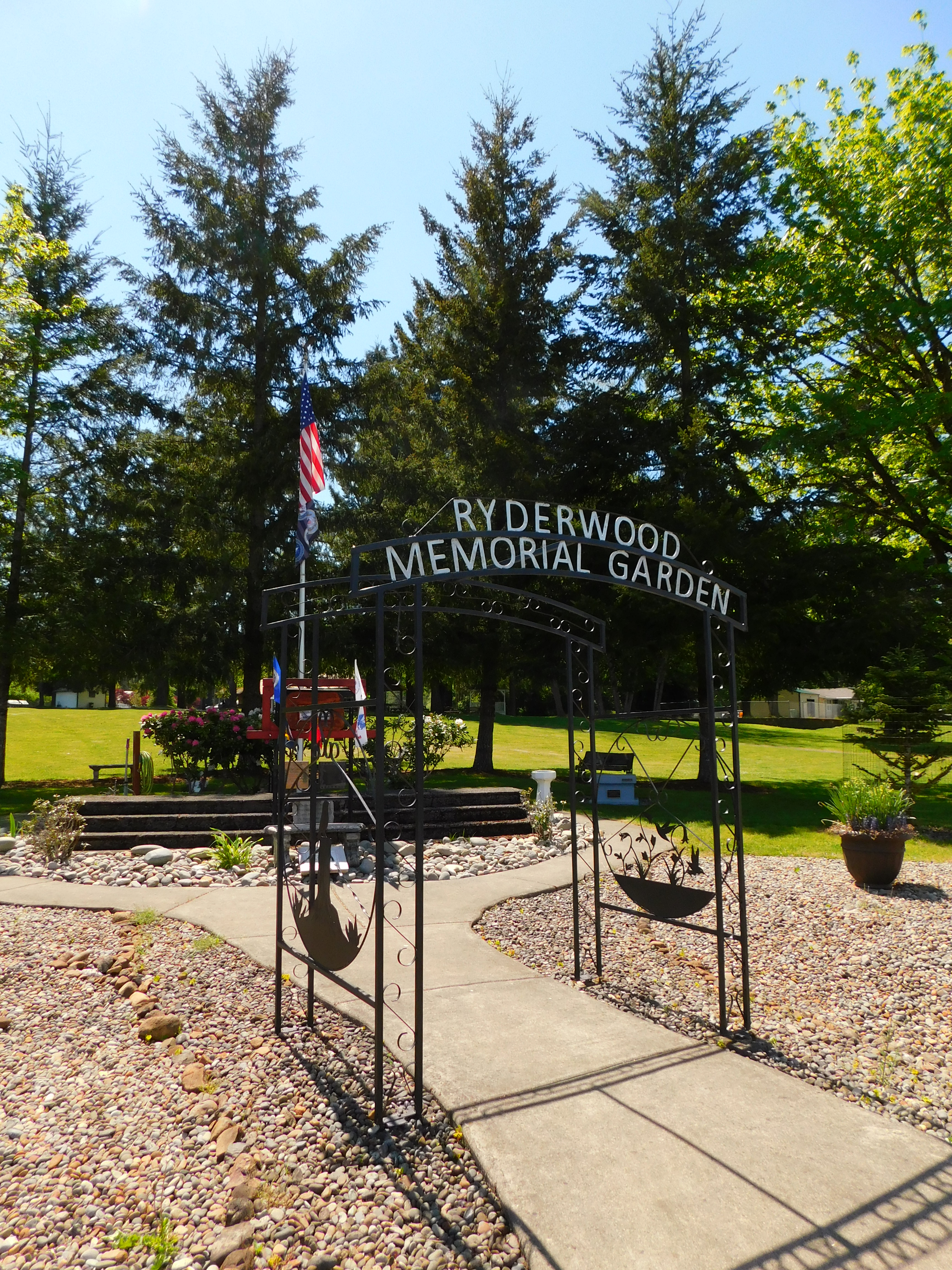
Ryderwood Memorial Garden, 2024

=== 20th century ===
Ryderwood, originally named Cougar Flats, was established as a logging camp by the Long-Bell Lumber Company in 1923. The town was constructed at a cost of $1.5 million and was the largest community to be built by private funding. Simultaneously, the town of Longview was created to mill and ship the lumber coming out of Ryderwood. Ryderwood was named for W. F. ("Uncle Bill") Ryder, the logging operations manager for Long-Bell, who came to the northwest to locate a timber source. The community was envisioned beyond that of a temporary logging camp, as a permanent center that would contain a school, church and theater. Billed as a place for families to live rather than bachelor workers, Ryderwood was considered a "modern logging town", as an article in The Log of Long-Bell proclaimed. At Ryderwood's peak, the town became the third largest in Cowlitz County with a population of 2,000 and the community contained a high school.

By 1953, due to advances in timber harvesting technology and the loss of old growth timber, Long-Bell sold the town to Harry H. Kem, a real estate specialist from Los Angeles, under Senior Estates, Inc. for $96,000 with the goal of creating a retirement community for pensioners. Homeowners were required to be retired and the functions of the town, such as the fire department, library, and water utilities system, were undertaken through volunteer efforts of Ryderwood residents. The town built Ryderwood Lake (Note: Also known and referred to as Ryderwood Pond.) in 1956, encompassing 6 acres inside an existing gravel pit.

In the 1980s, Ryderwood was home to the beginning of the Winlock Pickersfest, originally a bluegrass festival. The event relocated to Winlock in 2000. As of 2022, the festival continues to be held.

Ryderwood held a town-wide centennial celebration in 2023. Featuring a pioneer costumed parade, the event included the opening of a time capsule.

=== 21st century ===
Limited water sources have led the town to experience water shortages and rationing during times of drought. The community created the Ryderwood Drought Resiliency project to help create a water storage system and in early 2024, it was granted $1.6 million from the federal government to begin operations for a reservoir.

== Geography ==
According to the United States Census Bureau, the CDP has a total area of 0.16 square miles (0.41 km^{2}), all (100.0%) land.

The town is bordered to the west by Becker Creek and to the east by Campbell Creek and Ryderwood Lake. Campbell Creek is the main water source for the community.

== Demographics ==
Historical population
Census	Pop.	Note	%±
2010	395		—
2020	383		−3.0%
U.S. Decennial Census; 2000 2010

Ryderwood first appeared as a census designated place in the 2010 U.S. census.

At the town's peak, the population reached 2,000 people and had over 400 single-family homes. Ryderwood was large enough to have its own hospital.

=== Racial and ethnic composition ===
Ryderwood CDP, Washington – Racial and ethnic composition Note: the US Census treats Hispanic/Latino as an ethnic category. This table excludes Latinos from the racial categories and assigns them to a separate category. Hispanics/Latinos may be of any race.
Race / Ethnicity (NH = Non-Hispanic)	Pop 2010	Pop 2020	% 2010	% 2020
White alone (NH)	383	353	96.96%	92.17%
Black or African American alone (NH)	1	1	0.25%	0.26%
Native American or Alaska Native alone (NH)	5	3	1.27%	0.78%
Asian alone (NH)	0	2	0.00%	0.52%
Native Hawaiian or Pacific Islander alone (NH)	0	2	0.00%	0.52%
Other race alone (NH)	0	0	0.00%	0.00%
Mixed race or Multiracial (NH)	3	19	0.76%	4.96%
Hispanic or Latino (any race)	3	3	0.76%	0.78%
Total	395	383	100.00%	100.00%

=== 2010 Census ===
At the 2010 census, there were 395 people, 221 households and 134 families residing in the CDP. The population density was 2,453.4 people per square mile (947.3 people/km^{2}). There were 266 housing units at an average density of 1,652.2 units per square mile (637.9 units/km^{2}). The racial make-up of the CDP was 97.5% White, 0.3% African American, 1.3% Native American, 0.0% Asian, 0.0% Pacific Islander, 0.3% from other races and 0.8% from two or more races. Hispanic or Latino of any race were 0.8% of the population.

There were 221 households, of which 5.2% had children under the age of 18 living with them, 57.9% were married couples living together, 2.7% had a female householder with no husband present and 39.4% were non-families. 33.0% of all households were made up of individuals, and 26.2% had someone living alone who was 65 years of age or older. The average household size was 1.79 and the average family size was 2.15.

2.5% of the population were under the age of 18, 0.8% from 18 to 24, 2.5% from 25 to 44, 24.3% from 45 to 64 and 69.9% were 65 years of age or older. The median age was 68.7 years. For every 100 females, there were 82.9 males. For every 100 females age 18 and over, there were 84.2 males.

== Government ==
Ryderwood is considered a retirement community and is managed under the auspices of a homeowner's association, the Ryderwood Improvement and Service Association, a non-profit 501(c)4 organization staffed by resident volunteers.

== Notable people ==
- Arnold Riegger, sport shooter and Olympian
- Orin C. Smith, former executive and CEO of Starbucks
