= Caples, Washington =

Unincorporated community in Washington, United States

- Unincorporated community
- Location in the state of Washington Caples (the United States)
- Coordinates: 45°54′20″N 122°48′03″W
- Country: United States
- State: Washington
- County: Cowlitz
- Elevation: 20 ft (6.1 m)
- Time zone: UTC−8 (PST)
  - Summer (DST): UTC−7 (PDT)
- ZIP Code: 98674
- Area code(s): 360, 564
- GNIS feature ID: 1513509

Caples is an unincorporated community in Cowlitz County, Washington. The Caples community is located 2.5 miles (4.0 km) west of Woodland along Caples Road, on the east shore of Columbia River and across the river from Columbia City, Oregon. The Caples community is part of the Woodland School District, a K-12 school district of about 2,200 students.

== Caples Landing ==
Caples Landing (45°54′18″N 122°48′10″W) was an embarkation point for steamboat passengers on the Columbia River. On 25 February 1901 a passenger on the Lurline, Gordon Smith, fell overboard and drowned after boarding at Caples Landing.

In 1860, Charles Caples, a doctor in Columbia City, his brother Hezekiah Caples, and others planned to build a railroad along the Columbia River. The Columbia River and Hillsboro Railroad was incorporated in 1868. The railroad was intended to run from Hillsboro, Oregon to Caples Landing or else to Columbia City. The venture was a failure, but in 1883 Charles Caples was involved with the Northern Pacific Railway extension to Columbia City. Caples' farmhouse is now a registered historic place.
