= Ben Olsen House =

Historic house in Vader, Washington

- U.S. National Register of Historic Places
- Washington State Heritage Register
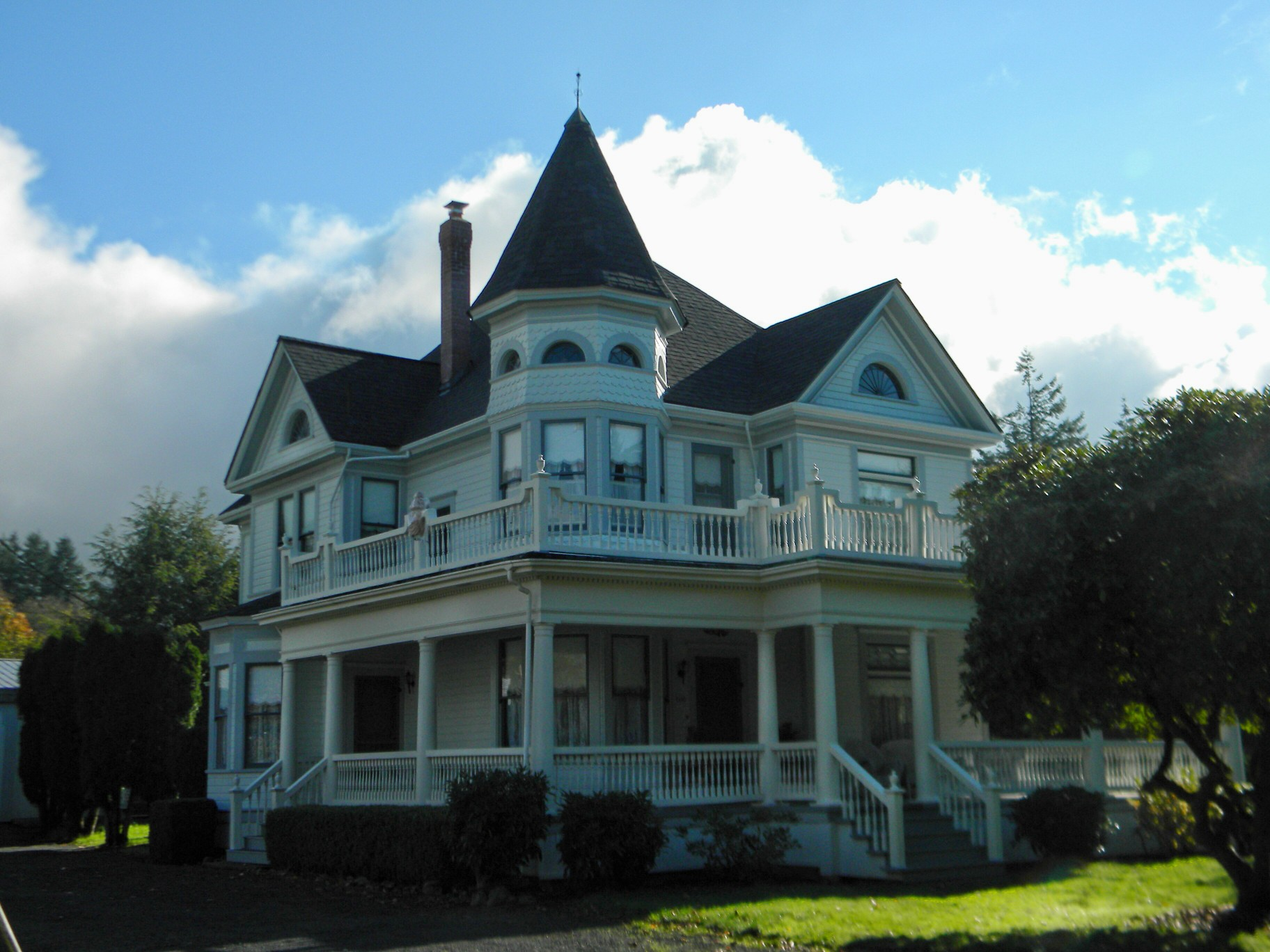
- Ben Olsen House, 2014

- Location within Washington (state)
- Location: D Street, Vader, Washington
- Coordinates: 46°23′48″N 122°57′16″W
- Area: less than one acre
- Built: 1903
- Built by: Sven "Swan" Olson
- Architectural style: Queen Anne, Victorian
- Restored: 1976, 2002
- NRHP reference No.: 76001897

Significant dates
- Added to NRHP: November 7, 1976
- Designated WSHR: November 7, 1976

The Ben Olsen House (Note: Although the NRHP form lists the name as Olsen, the moniker is usually, if not overwhelmingly so, spelled as Olson. See sources throughout the article for the discrepancy.) is a private, historic residence located in Vader, Washington. The home has been listed on the National Register of Historic Places (NRHP) since 1976. Along with the Grace Evangelical Church of Vader, the home is one of two NRHP-listed sites in the city.

The residence was built in the early 1900s for Ben Olsen, a prominent lumberman in the community. The 3,500-square-foot (330 m^{2}) home is considered mostly unaltered and boasts a variety of architectural styles, such as Colonial Revival, Queen Anne, and Victorian. The most notable features are its roofline, large veranda, and a turret.

The Ben Olsen House, known locally as "The Mansion", was a symbol of wealth and prosperity during the peak timber years of the town of Vader, then known as Little Falls. The house was the first residence in the community to use electricity. The Ben Olsen House remains the only Queen Anne style architecture home in Vader.

== History ==
The Ben Olsen House was constructed possibly by 1903 and according to the National Register of Historic Places (NRHP) nomination, at least between 1905 and 1913. The residence was constructed by Ben Olsen's brother, Sven "Swan" Olson. A small home on an adjoining property was built under Ben Olsen's instruction, specifically for his bookkeeper.

The construction occurred during the time when Vader, Washington was known as Little Falls. The community was a fast-growing town at the time, noted for its sawmills, clay production, and railroad connections to four different lines. With a peak population of approximately 5,000 in the 1900s, the Ben Olsen House became a prominent feature, and display, of both the town's success and Olsen's social and financial standing. The home was the first residence in Vader to have electricity, powered during the daytime into early evening by Olsen's Stillwater mill.

Locally the home is simply known as, "The Mansion", and remains the only Queen Anne-style building in the community. A ghost of a little boy is reported to roam the house. The child is said to have died when the house maid, who was carrying him to a bottom-floor fireplace to dry after a bath, tripped on her dress on the stairs, the boy flying through a window to his death.

The home was under the ownership of the Vermeren family by the 1976 NRHP nomination and the residence sold to Dave Holland in 1986 for $95,000.

=== Ben Olsen ===
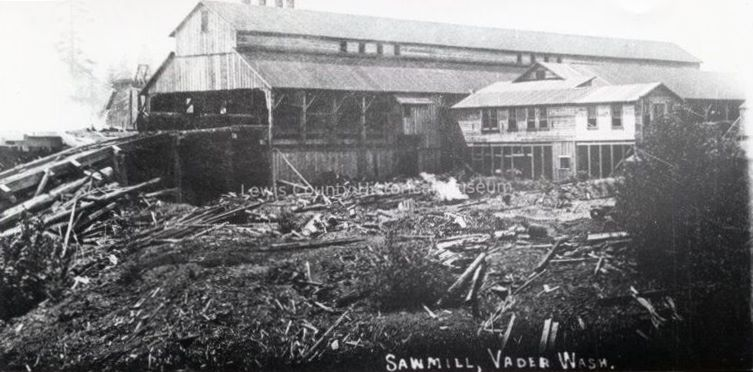
Stillwater Lumber and Shingle Mill, 1913-1918

Ben Olsen was a Swedish immigrant but little else is known of his personal life. As a businessman, he owned the Stillwater Logging and Lumber Company with his six brothers; the company operated a sawmill in Vader beginning in late December 1907, at its peak employing as many as 180 men. Olsen also formed a partnership, the Little Falls Water Company, to supply water to the Little Falls community in the early 1910s. By 1915, he was a resident of Seaside, Oregon, beginning a sawmill in the town in 1913 and operating a logging operation on the Columbia River, with his brother, Perry.

The water company was sued in 1912 for "unwholesome and impure" water contaminated with "decayed matter and other filth" and for unfair rates. All charges were found to be unwarranted and were dismissed. However, the Washington state public service commission overseeing the case stated that the company's pipes and facilities were in disrepair and recommended maintenance to fix leaking and low-pressure pipes. Additionally, a prior case in 1911 that targeted favorable rates to sawmills in the Little Falls region, therefore possibly being discriminatory to residents, was noted and the 1912 commission ordered the company to adhere to stricter contract and accounting standards.

His lumber mill was purchased by Weyerhaeuser in 1914. The mill burned down on the evening of January 11, 1916, rebuilt, and then permanently shuttered after another fire on the night of September 1, 1918. The Stillwater timber holdings were sold to the Winlock Lumber Company,

== Geography ==
The Ben Olsen House, an occupied private residence, is located at the end of D Street, which is approximately southeast of the downtown core of Vader, Washington. The home rests on the boundary of a meadow.

== Architecture and features ==
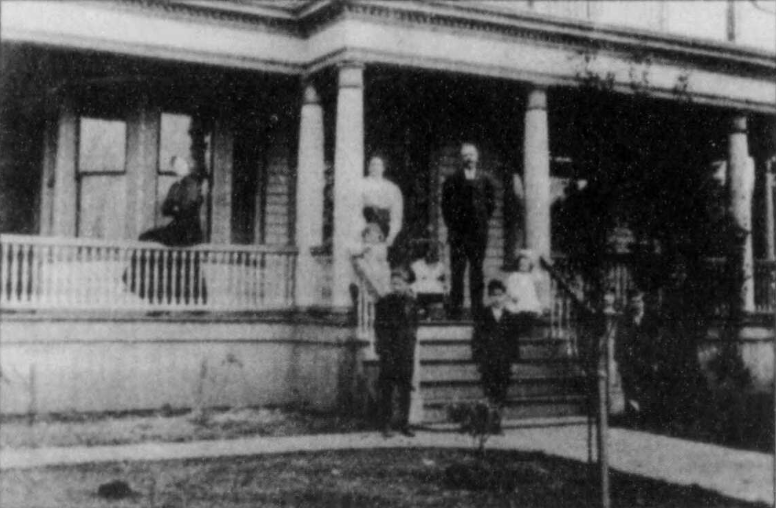
Ben Olsen House and family, 1908

Unless otherwise noted, the details provided are based on the 1976 National Register of Historic Places (NRHP) nomination form and may not reflect updates or changes to the Ben Olsen House in the interim.

The Ben Olsen House is a 2 1/2-story residence in the form of Queen Anne style architecture. The home has also been described as being under the Victorian architecture-style or as a Queen Anne with Colonial Revival features. The property faces west and at the time of the NRHP nomination, contained remnants of an orchard. The house is approximately 3,500 square feet (330 m^{2}), contains five bedrooms, and three original chimneys.

=== Exterior ===
The exterior of the home, considered mostly unaltered under the NRHP nomination, is supported by a brick-and-post foundation. The layout is considered irregular but asymmetrically balanced, though the floorplan is essentially rectangular. The most dominant asymmetrical features are three gable wings, a polygonal bay, and a turret. The building has a hip roof with cross-gables and pediments. The octagonal turret, located on the north corner of the home, is topped with a pyramid-style roof and finial.

Siding is mostly shiplap with a 5 foot (1.5 metres)-wide band of shingle siding at the start of second floor up to the window sills; the shingle siding also covers the pedimented gables. Fish scale shingles surface the turret.

Double hung sash windows make up most of the lighting to the interior on the first two floors. Two, fixed double-width windows are centered on the first floor front wing. An original curvilinear transom remains on one of the fixed casements. Fanlights are a predominate feature of the top story, located within the pediment of the gables and the turret.

=== Interior ===
The NRHP nomination declared the interior to also be mostly unaltered despite the loss of original lighting and hardware. Stained and varnished woodwork remained throughout the home, with exception to the dining room, where the trim is painted. The dining room contains beaded wainscotting and a built-in sideboard. Major changes to the interior are standard upgrades to the kitchen area, mostly to surfaces and cabinetry.

=== Renovations and alterations ===
The home once contained a veranda that spanned three sides of the building. The porch was altered, along with the removal of some skirting at an unknown point, removing a key component of the original elements of the home. However, outside of the addition of composition shingles on the roof, the exterior was considered by the NRHP nomination to be mostly unaltered.

At the time of the nomination, the house was recognized for recent renovation efforts by the owners at the time, the Vermeren family, especially to the replacement of rotted window casements and millwork. The veranda was expected to be restored to near its original state. The family had received a grant earlier in 1976 of over $2,000 by the Washington State Parks and Recreation Commission to help offset costs of their efforts on the home. The grant was conditional, requiring the Ben Olsen House to remain in a "historic condition for a set period of time".

By 2002, the home had been considered fully restored under ownership of David Holland. Costs were estimated to be as high as $250,000. Additional alterations later in the 2000s under Holland included the addition of extra downspouts for the gutter system to alleviate excessive water run-off from the roof. The heating system was converted to an all-electric heat pump system, replacing a wood-burning stove. Holland also had the three original chimneys rebuilt.

== Tourism ==
In the 2000s, the home, along with the Grace Evangelical Church of Vader, was part of "An Old-Fashioned Christmas" celebration and tour held in the town. The house was part of the "Hidden Treasures of Lewis County" tour held by the local chapter of the United Way in 2003.

== Significance ==
The Ben Olsen House was added to the National Register of Historic Places and the Washington State Heritage Register on November 7, 1976. The home was noted for its connection to the early boom years of Little Falls/Vader, and subsequently noted to be "particularly interesting" for its "size, architectural style and state of preservation". The home has been described as being built in the "great spirit of the time", mirroring the early community's pride and wealth.

In 2003, the Ben Olsen House received the Officers Annual Award for Outstanding Achievement in Stewardship by the Washington State Department of Archaeology and Historic Preservation.
