= Rose Valley, Washington =

Unincorporated community in Washington, United States

- Unincorporated community
- Location in the state of Washington Rose Valley (the United States)
- Coordinates: 46°05′51″N 122°49′35″W
- Country: United States
- State: Washington
- County: Cowlitz
- Elevation: 351 ft (107 m)
- Time zone: UTC−8 (PST)
  - Summer (DST): UTC−7 (PDT)
- ZIP Code: 98626
- Area code(s): 360, 564
- FIPS code: 53-59985
- GNIS feature ID: 1531319

Rose Valley is an unincorporated community in Cowlitz County, Washington, southeast of the city of Kelso. Rose Valley is located south on Old Pacific Highway from exit 36 of Interstate 5, then east on Rose Valley Road. The Rose Valley community is part of the Kelso School District, a K-12 school district of nearly 5,000 students.
