= Longview Heights, Washington =

- CDP
- Location of Longview Heights, Washington
- Coordinates: 46°10′50″N 122°59′15″W
- Country: United States
- State: Washington
- County: Cowlitz

Area
  - Total: 4.3 sq mi (11.1 km^{2})
  - Land: 4.2 sq mi (11.0 km^{2})
  - Water: 0.039 sq mi (0.1 km^{2})
- Elevation: 869 ft (265 m)

Population (2020)
  - Total: 4,033
  - Density: 950/sq mi (367/km^{2})
- Time zone: UTC-8 (Pacific (PST))
  - Summer (DST): UTC-7 (PDT)
- FIPS code: 53-40270
- GNIS feature ID: 2408128

Longview Heights is a census-designated place (CDP) in Cowlitz County, Washington, United States. The population was 4,033 at the 2020 Census. The CDP is known locally as Columbia Heights.

== Geography ==
According to the United States Census Bureau, the CDP has a total area of 4.3 square miles (11.1 km^{2}), of which, 4.2 square miles (11.0 km^{2}) of it is land and 0.04 square miles (0.1 km^{2}) of it (0.93%) is water.

== Demographics ==
As of the census of 2000, there were 3,513 people, 1,320 households, and 1,028 families residing in the CDP. The population density was 827.5 people per square mile (319.1/km^{2}). There were 1,401 housing units at an average density of 330.0/sq mi (127.3/km^{2}). The racial makeup of the CDP was 95.16% White, 0.40% African American, 0.94% Native American, 1.42% Asian, 0.09% Pacific Islander, 0.43% from other races, and 1.57% from two or more races. Hispanic or Latino of any race were 1.79% of the population.

There were 1,320 households, out of which 34.4% had children under the age of 18 living with them, 66.4% were married couples living together, 7.4% had a female householder with no husband present, and 22.1% were non-families. 16.7% of all households were made up of individuals, and 4.8% had someone living alone who was 65 years of age or older. The average household size was 2.66 and the average family size was 2.98.

In the CDP, the age distribution of the population shows 26.1% under the age of 18, 8.2% from 18 to 24, 26.2% from 25 to 44, 28.7% from 45 to 64, and 10.9% who were 65 years of age or older. The median age was 39 years. For every 100 females, there were 101.4 males. For every 100 females age 18 and over, there were 99.2 males.

The median income for a household in the CDP was $48,802, and the median income for a family was $52,794. Males had a median income of $42,139 versus $24,857 for females. The per capita income for the CDP was $21,262. About 2.6% of families and 3.4% of the population were below the poverty line, including 6.1% of those under age 18 and none of those age 65 or over.
