= Ostrander, Washington =

Unincorporated community in Washington, United States

- Unincorporated community
- Location in the state of Washington Ostrander (the United States)
- Coordinates: 46°11′33″N 122°53′31″W
- Country: United States
- State: Washington
- County: Cowlitz
- Elevation: 98 ft (30 m)
- Time zone: UTC−8 (PST)
  - Summer (DST): UTC−7 (PDT)
- ZIP Code: 98626
- Area code(s): 360, 564
- FIPS code: 53-52145
- GNIS feature ID: 1512540

Ostrander is an unincorporated community in Cowlitz County, Washington, north of the city of Kelso. Ostrander is located north on North Pacific Avenue from exit 42 of Interstate 5. The Ostrander community is part of the Kelso School District, a K-12 school district of nearly 5,000 students.

== History ==
A post office called Ostrander was established in 1894, and remained in operation until 1939. The community was named after Nathaniel Ostrander, an early settler.
