= Canexus =

Canexus Corporation (TSX: CUS) was a publicly traded company listed on the Toronto Stock Exchange. The company's headquarter was based in Calgary in Alberta, Canada. Canexus focused on low-cost and sustainable chemical operations; producing sodium chlorate and chlor-alkali products, mainly used for the pulp and paper and water treatment industries. Canexus has 4 plants in Canada located in British Columbia, Manitoba and Quebec. Canexus also has a site in Brazil where two plants operate.

Canexus owned the hydrocarbon transloading service terminal for the oil and gas industry located in Bruderheim, Alberta. Canexus sold the facility to Cenovus in 2015.

On March 10, 2017, Canexus was acquired by Chemtrade.
