= West Side Highway, Washington =

- Former CDP
- Location of West Side Highway CDP, Washington
- Coordinates: 46°11′03″N 122°55′04″W
- Country: United States
- State: Washington
- County: Cowlitz

Area
  - Total: 2.7 sq mi (6.9 km^{2})
  - Land: 2.5 sq mi (6.5 km^{2})
  - Water: 0.15 sq mi (0.4 km^{2})
- Elevation: 56 ft (17 m)

Population (2010)
  - Total: 5,517
  - Density: 2,198/sq mi (848.8/km^{2})
- Time zone: UTC-8 (Pacific (PST))
  - Summer (DST): UTC-7 (PDT)
- FIPS code: 53-77745
- GNIS feature ID: 2409567

West Side Highway was a census-designated place (CDP) in Cowlitz County, Washington, named after a state highway (SR 411) running north–south between Longview and Castle Rock. As of the 2010 census, the CDP population was 5,517. Prior to the 2020 census, the CDP was split into two new CDPs, Beacon Hill and Lexington.

== Geography ==
According to the United States Census Bureau, the CDP had a total area of 2.7 square miles (6.9 km^{2}), of which, 2.5 square miles (6.5 km^{2}) were land and 0.2 square miles (0.4 km^{2}) (6.01%) were water.

== Demographics ==
As of the census of 2000, there were 4,565 people, 1,635 households, and 1,291 families residing in the CDP. The population density was 1,828.0 people per square mile (705.0/km^{2}). There were 1,715 housing units at an average density of 686.8/sq mi (264.9/km^{2}). The racial makeup of the CDP was 94.22% White, 1.23% Native American, 1.12% Asian, 0.26% African American, 0% Pacific Islander, 0.81% from other races, and 2.37% from two or more races. Hispanic or Latino of any race were 1.99% of the population.

There were 1,635 households, out of which 38.7% had children under the age of 18 living with them, 65.4% were married couples living together, 8.8% had a female householder with no husband present, and 21.0% were non-families. 16.8% of all households were made up of individuals, and 6.8% had someone living alone who was 65 years of age or older. The average household size was 2.74 and the average family size was 3.04.

In the CDP, the age distribution of the population shows 28.6% under the age of 18, 7.2% from 18 to 24, 28.3% from 25 to 44, 21.6% from 45 to 64, and 14.3% who were 65 years of age or older. The median age was 35 years. For every 100 females, there were 95.7 males. For every 100 females age 18 and over, there were 92.2 males.

The median income for a household in the CDP was $46,604, and the median income for a family was $55,598. Males had a median income of $44,758 versus $24,545 for females. The per capita income for the CDP was $18,790. About 11.5% of families and 12.2% of the population were below the poverty line, including 15.1% of those under age 18 and 11.5% of those age 65 or over.
