= Rose Valley, Chișinău =

Urban park in Chişinău, Moldova

Coordinates: 47°00′15″N 28°51′08″E

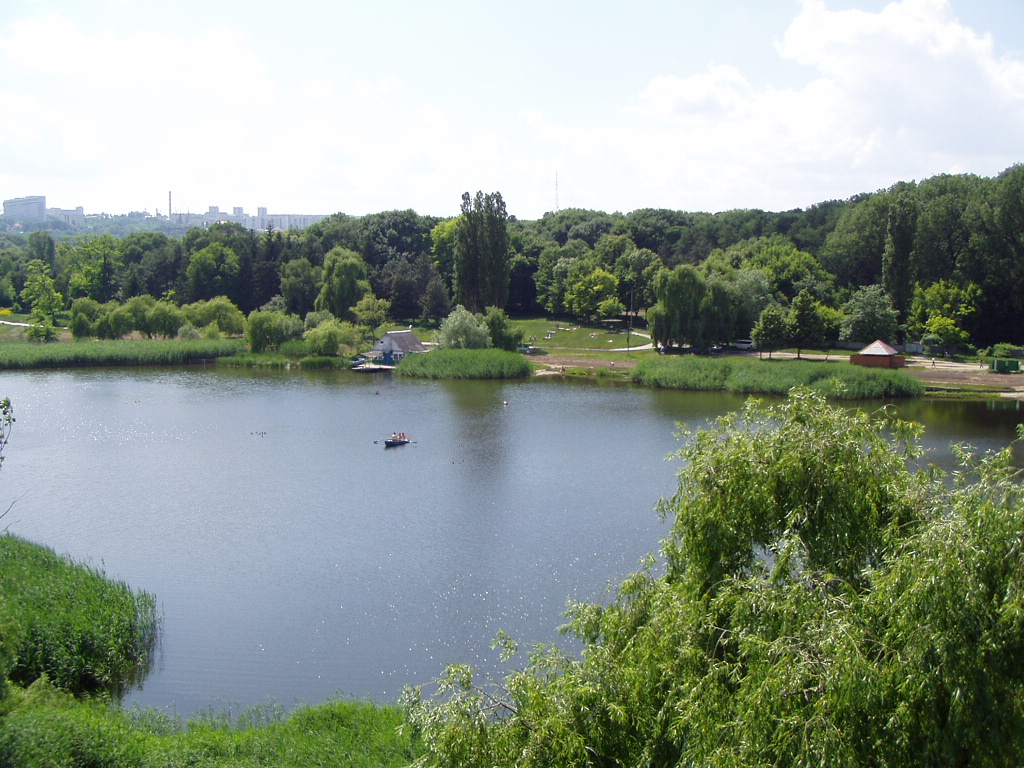
Rose Valley lake

Rose Valley Chişinău (Romanian: Valea Trandafirilor) is an urban park including the remains of an ancient Slavonic sanctuary. It is located in the city of Chişinău, Moldova.

== Modern times ==
In the 1950s, rose plantations were planted in the Rose Valley.

At the end of the 1960s, the park saw some improvement. New lanes were laid, concrete dams were built, and lakes were cleared of silt.

Now the central section of the park is decorated with several lakes covering nine hectares. About 50 varieties of trees and bushes grow there. There is a stage with a capacity of 1000 spectators, a small amusement park with a Ferris wheel, and the restaurants Doina (destroyed), Cetatea Veche ("The Old Fortress"), and Curtea Vînătorească ("The Hunters' Court"). The remains of several stone idols were preserved and restored in the 1970s in the form of decorative statues. Also preserved were the stairs that led to the altars and the foundation of an ancient construction on the shore of one of the lakes — now part of the restaurant Cetatea Veche.

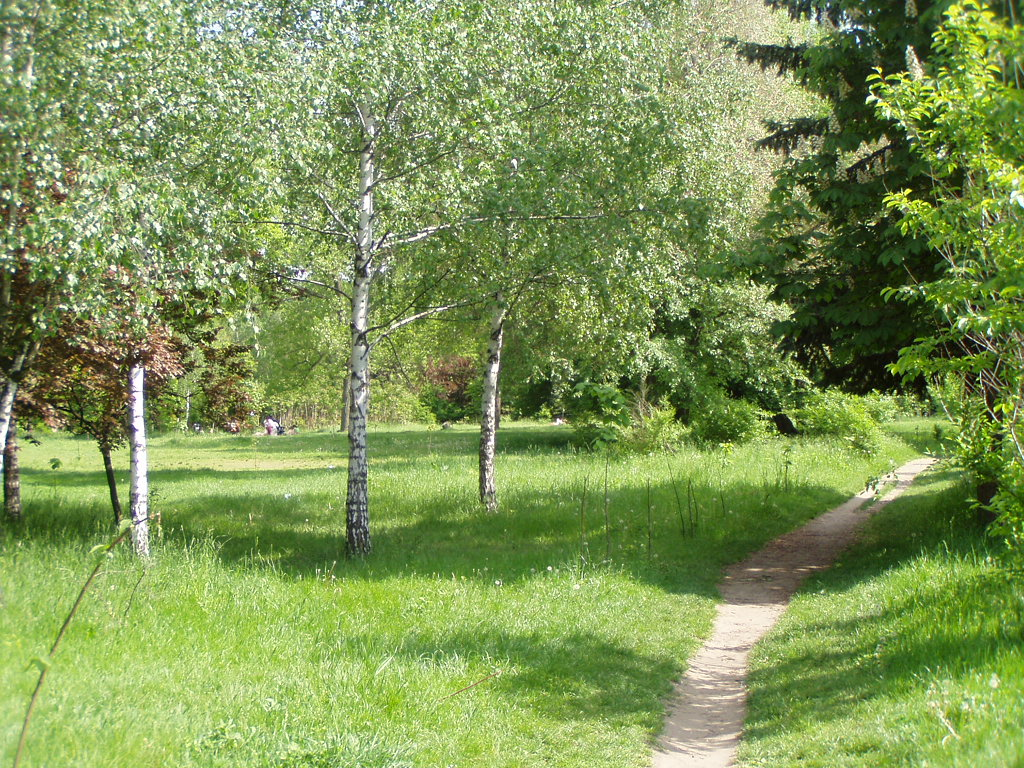
Rose Valley
