= Cowlitz County, Washington =

County in Washington, United States

- County
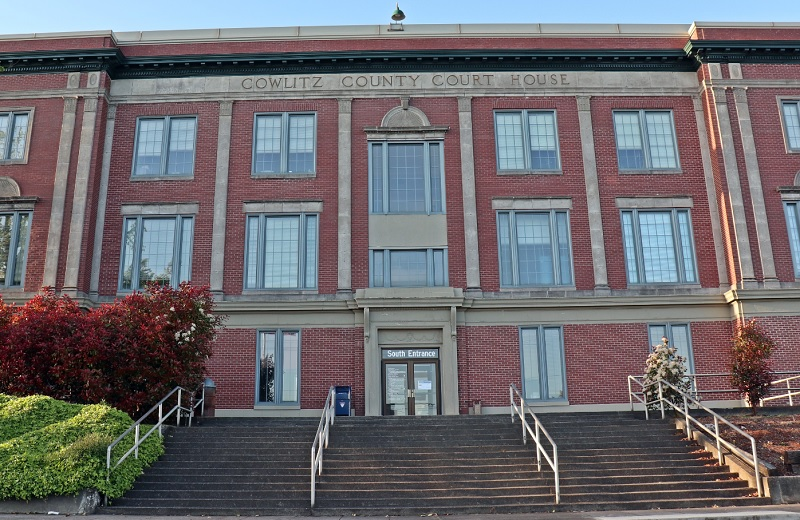
- Cowlitz County Courthouse

- Location within the U.S. state of Washington
- Coordinates: 46°11′48″N 122°40′42″W
- Country: United States
- State: Washington
- Founded: April 21, 1854
- Seat: Kelso
- Largest city: Longview

Area
  - Total: 1,166 sq mi (3,020 km^{2})
  - Land: 1,140 sq mi (3,000 km^{2})
  - Water: 26 sq mi (67 km^{2}) 2.2%

Population (2020)
  - Total: 110,730
  - Estimate (2025): 114,885 ▲
  - Density: 97.1/sq mi (37.5/km^{2})
- Time zone: UTC−8 (Pacific)
  - Summer (DST): UTC−7 (PDT)
- Congressional district: 3rd
- Website: co.cowlitz.wa.us

Cowlitz County is a county located in the U.S. state of Washington. As of the 2020 census, its population was 110,730. The county seat is Kelso, and its largest city is Longview. The county was formed in April 1854. Its name derives from the anglicized version of the Cowlitz Indian term Cow-e-liske, meaning either 'river of shifting sands' or 'capturing the medicine spirit.' Cowlitz comprises the Longview, WA Metropolitan statistical area, which is also included in the Portland-Vancouver-Salem, OR-WA Combined statistical area.

== History ==
Prior to the Europeans' arrival to the area, it was inhabited by numerous Native American tribes, with the Cowlitz tribe being the largest. They were drawn to the region by the abundance of salmon. The Cowlitz are considered to be the first regional inhabitants to engage in commerce as they traded extensively with other tribes in Western and Eastern Washington. The Cowlitz Indian population declined significantly from the 1829-1830 smallpox outbreak.

European explorers discovered and began navigating the Columbia River in 1792 as British Lieutenant W. R. Broughton sailed up the river to and past present-day Cowlitz County. Then on November 5, 1805, Lewis and Clark camped at the mouth of the Kalama River. Over the following days, they reached the present sites of Kelso and Longview.

By the 1820s, the Hudson's Bay Company had established a lucrative fur trade in the region. Furs were shipped down the Cowlitz River to the Columbia, where they were loaded and shipped around the world. Trade declined significantly in the late 1830s, as overhunting reduced the annual yields, and wearing fur had become less fashionable.

During the next several decades, white settlement of the region was in full swing. Most of the settlers homesteaded near the tributaries that fed the Columbia River, forming settlements. The first was Monticello, near present-day Longview. In 1841, several families with the HBC directed Sinclair expedition from Red River Colony settled there.

On November 25, 1852, at Monticello, settlers from the Cowlitz and Puget Sound regions drafted a petition (the Monticello Convention) to the federal government, calling for a separate territory north of the Columbia River to be carved out of the existing Oregon Territory. The petition was successful; three months later, the United States Congress formed the Columbia Territory, although it was soon renamed Washington Territory.

The newly separated territory was governed by two existing counties. In August 1845, the Oregon territorial government had created Vancouver County. Its boundary covered the entire area of present-day Washington. In December of that same year, the Oregon territorial government sliced off the eastern portion to create Lewis County. In 1849, the reduced Vancouver County was renamed Clark County. When the new Washington territorial government began functioning, among its first actions was the creation of Cowlitz County from the southwestern portion of Clark County. This proclamation was finalized on April 24, 1854, signed into law by Governor Isaac Stevens. Later in 1854, the western portion of the new county was partitioned off to form Wahkiakum County; otherwise, the county's boundary has remained unchanged until the present.

Nearly every town that sprang up in the late 19th century began around a logging or lumber-milling operation. In the latter half of the 1920s, the Weyerhaeuser Company and Long-Bell Lumber Company established processing facilities. At the time, these two facilities were the first- and second-largest in the world. The county is still heavily dependent on the timber industry.

Four towns have functioned as the Cowlitz County seat:

- Monticello (1854–1865)
- Freeport (1865–1872)
- Kalama (1872–1922)
- Kelso (1922–Present)

== Geography ==
Cowlitz County is in the southwestern part of Washington. According to the U.S. Census Bureau, the county has a total area of 1,166 square miles (3,020 km^{2}), of which 26 square miles (67 km^{2}) (2.2%) are covered by water.

Cowlitz County is part of the Puget Sound – Willamette Depression, a geologic formation extending southward from the Puget Sound to the Willamette Valley in Oregon. Nestled against the Cascade Mountains, many of the county's major rivers originate in this range, including the Columbia, Cowlitz, Coweeman, Kalama, Lewis and Toutle.

Cowlitz County is one of the state's smaller counties (28th of 39).

=== Geographic features ===
- Cascade Mountains
- Columbia River
- Cowlitz River

=== Major highways ===
- Interstate 5
- State Route 4
- State Route 411
- State Route 432
- State Route 503
- State Route 504

=== Adjacent counties ===
- Lewis County - north
- Skamania County - east
- Clark County - south
- Wahkiakum County - west
- Columbia County, Oregon - south

=== National protected areas ===
- Gifford Pinchot National Forest (part)
- Mount St. Helens National Volcanic Monument (part)

=== County parks ===
- Catlin Cemetery
- Cougar Wayside
- Finn Hall Wayside
- Harry Gardner Park
- Hog Island Access
- Riverside Park
- SRS Viewpoint
- Woodbrook Park

== Demographics ==
Historical population
Census	Pop.	Note	%±
1860	406		—
1870	730		79.8%
1880	2,062		182.5%
1890	5,917		187.0%
1900	7,877		33.1%
1910	12,561		59.5%
1920	11,791		−6.1%
1930	31,906		170.6%
1940	40,155		25.9%
1950	53,369		32.9%
1960	57,801		8.3%
1970	68,616		18.7%
1980	79,548		15.9%
1990	82,119		3.2%
2000	92,948		13.2%
2010	102,410		10.2%
2020	110,730		8.1%
2025 (est.)	114,885	▲	3.8%
U.S. Decennial Census; 1790–1960 1900–1990; 1990–2000 2010–2020

=== 2020 census ===
As of the 2020 census, 110,730 people, 42,787 households, and 28,644 families were residing in the county. The population density was 97.0 inhabitants per square mile (37.5/km^{2}). The 45,424 housing units had an average density of 39.8 inhabitants per square mile (15.4/km^{2}).

About 22.7% of residents were under 18, 5.6% were under 5, and 19.8% were 65 or older; the median age was 41.0 years. For every 100 females, there were 98.1 males, and for every 100 females 18 and over, there were 96.6 males. 67.0% of residents lived in urban areas and 33.0% lived in rural areas.

Cowlitz County, Washington – Racial and ethnic composition Note: the US Census treats Hispanic/Latino as an ethnic category. This table excludes Latinos from the racial categories and assigns them to a separate category. Hispanics/Latinos may be of any race.
Race / Ethnicity (NH = Non-Hispanic)	Pop 2000	Pop 2010	Pop 2020	% 2000	% 2010	% 2020
White alone (NH)	83,571	87,825	88,067	89.91%	85.76%	79.53%
Black or African American alone (NH)	448	572	746	0.48%	0.56%	0.67%
Native American or Alaska Native alone (NH)	1,280	1,361	1,409	1.38%	1.33%	1.27%
Asian alone (NH)	1,195	1,472	1,721	1.29%	1.44%	1.55%
Pacific Islander alone (NH)	112	209	643	0.12%	0.20%	0.58%
Other race alone (NH)	62	64	485	0.07%	0.06%	0.44%
Multiracial (NH)	2,049	2,932	6,857	2.20%	2.86%	6.19%
Hispanic or Latino (any race)	4,231	7,975	10,802	4.55%	7.79%	9.76%
Total	92,948	102,410	110,730	100.00%	100.00%	100.00%

The racial makeup of the county was 82.0% White, 0.7% Black or African American, 1.6% American Indian and Alaska Native, 1.6% Asian, 4.3% from some other race, and 9.2% from two or more races. Hispanic or Latino residents of any race comprised 9.8% of the population.

Of the 42,787 households in the county, 29.8% had children under 18 living with them and 24.4% had a female householder with no spouse or partner present. About 25.6% of all households were made up of individuals, and 12.5% had someone living alone who was 65 or older.

Of those 45,424 housing units, 5.8% were vacant. Among occupied housing units, 67.7% were owner-occupied and 32.3% were renter-occupied. The homeowner vacancy rate was 1.2% and the rental vacancy rate was 5.5%.

=== 2010 census ===
As of the 2010 census, 102,410 people, 40,244 households, and 27,241 families were living in the county. The population density was 89.8 people per square mile (34.7 people/km^{2}). The 43,450 housing units had an average density of 38.1 units per square mile (14.7 units/km^{2}). The racial makeup of the county was 88.9% White, 1.5% Asian, 1.5% American Indian, 0.6% black or African American, 0.2% Pacific islander, 3.5% from other races, and 3.7% from two or more races. Those of Hispanic or Latino origin made up 7.8% of the population. In terms of ancestry, 24.4% were German, 15.0% were Irish, 12.3% were English, 6.2% were Norwegian, and 5.4% were American.

Of the 40,244 households, 31.8% had children under 18 living with them, 50.2% were married couples living together, 11.8% had a female householder with no husband present, 32.3% were not families, and 25.8% of all households were made up of individuals. The average household size was 2.51 and the average family size was 2.99. The median age was 40.2 years.

The median income for a household in the county was $45,877 and for a family was $55,002. Males had a median income of $48,329 versus $32,438 for females. The per capita income for the county was $22,948. About 11.8% of families and 16.9% of the population were below the poverty line, including 23.3% of those under 18 and 7.1% of those 65 or over.

== Politics ==
The county had been reliably Democratic in Presidential elections for over three decades, and Walter Mondale won this county in Ronald Reagan's 49-state landslide in 1984. Donald Trump won a majority of the vote in 2016, 2020, and 2024, becoming the first Republican to win this county since Reagan in 1980.

United States presidential election results for Cowlitz County, Washington
Year	Republican		Democratic		Third party(ies)	
Year	No.	%	No.	%	No.	%
1892	738	41.69%	566	31.98%	466	26.33%
1896	989	49.75%	974	48.99%	25	1.26%
1900	1,171	63.33%	619	33.48%	59	3.19%
1904	1,589	77.32%	317	15.43%	149	7.25%
1908	1,573	65.65%	617	25.75%	206	8.60%
1912	1,348	34.66%	919	23.63%	1,622	41.71%
1916	2,113	55.11%	1,282	33.44%	439	11.45%
1920	2,267	61.49%	801	21.72%	619	16.79%
1924	3,274	55.66%	927	15.76%	1,681	28.58%
1928	5,882	68.76%	2,581	30.17%	91	1.06%
1932	3,767	33.90%	5,443	48.98%	1,903	17.12%
1936	3,617	25.31%	10,147	71.00%	528	3.69%
1940	6,078	34.31%	11,420	64.47%	216	1.22%
1944	6,157	36.65%	10,485	62.41%	157	0.93%
1948	7,098	37.55%	11,075	58.59%	729	3.86%
1952	12,366	52.08%	11,242	47.34%	138	0.58%
1956	11,912	48.80%	12,448	51.00%	50	0.20%
1960	12,103	49.79%	12,054	49.58%	153	0.63%
1964	6,708	27.38%	17,605	71.85%	188	0.77%
1968	10,842	42.10%	13,363	51.90%	1,545	6.00%
1972	14,431	51.21%	12,682	45.00%	1,069	3.79%
1976	12,531	44.11%	14,958	52.66%	917	3.23%
1980	13,154	45.93%	12,560	43.86%	2,925	10.21%
1984	14,858	47.98%	15,361	49.60%	749	2.42%
1988	12,009	42.19%	16,090	56.53%	366	1.29%
1992	10,000	28.96%	15,052	43.59%	9,477	27.45%
1996	11,221	33.48%	18,054	53.87%	4,240	12.65%
2000	16,873	45.65%	18,233	49.33%	1,856	5.02%
2004	20,217	47.60%	21,589	50.83%	667	1.57%
2008	19,554	43.23%	24,597	54.38%	1,078	2.38%
2012	20,746	46.49%	22,726	50.93%	1,148	2.57%
2016	24,185	51.30%	17,908	37.99%	5,049	10.71%
2020	34,424	57.11%	23,938	39.71%	1,918	3.18%
2024	34,580	58.29%	22,825	38.47%	1,920	3.24%

== Communities ==
=== Cities ===
- Castle Rock
- Kalama
- Kelso (County seat)
- Longview
- Woodland (Partly in Clark County)

=== Census-designated places ===
- Beacon Hill
- Cougar
- Lexington
- Longview Heights
- Ryderwood
- West Side Highway (former)

=== Unincorporated communities ===
- Ariel
- Bunker Hill
- Caples
- Caples Landing
- Carrolls
- Coal Creek
- Columbia Heights
- Davis Terrace
- Eufaula
- Eufaula Heights
- Evergreen Terrace
- Kid Valley
- Oak Point
- Olequa
- Ostrander
- Pleasant Hill
- Rocky Point
- Rose Valley
- Saint Helens
- Sandy Bend
- Sightly
- Silver Lake
- Stella
- Toutle
- Vision Acres
- West Longview
- Yale

== See also ==
- National Register of Historic Places listings in Cowlitz County, Washington
- Impact of the 2019–20 coronavirus pandemic on the meat industry in the United States
