= Toutle, Washington =

Unincorporated community in Washington, United States

- Unincorporated community
- Location in the state of Washington
- Coordinates: 46°19′29″N 122°44′11″W
- Country: United States
- State: Washington
- County: Cowlitz
- Elevation: 499 ft (152 m)
- Time zone: UTC−8 (PST)
  - Summer (DST): UTC−7 (PDT)
- ZIP code: 98649
- Area code(s): 360, 564
- FIPS code: 53-72100
- GNIS feature ID: 1511568

Toutle is an unincorporated community in Cowlitz County, Washington.

== Etymology ==
Both the town and Toutle River, derive their name from a band of the Skillot people of the Chinookan tribe, the Hullooetell.

== Geography ==
Toutle is located 10 miles (16 km) east of Castle Rock along Washington State Route 504, which is also known as the Spirit Lake Memorial Highway. Toutle is near Mount St. Helens and the Mount St. Helens National Volcanic Monument, which lies at the end of the Spirit Lake Memorial Highway.

== Education ==
The Toutle community is part of the Toutle Lake School District, a K–12 school district of about 694 students that serves the communities of Toutle and Silver Lake, Washington.
