= Vader, Washington =

City in Lewis County, Washington state

- City
- Historic buildings in downtown Vader, 2025

- Location of Vader, Washington
- Coordinates: 46°24′16″N 122°57′25″W
- Country: United States
- State: Washington
- County: Lewis

Government
  - Type: City council
  - Mayor: Joe Schey

Area
  - Total: 0.93 sq mi (2.41 km^{2})
  - Land: 0.93 sq mi (2.41 km^{2})
  - Water: 0 sq mi (0.00 km^{2})
- Elevation: 164 ft (50 m)

Population (2020)
  - Total: 629
  - Density: 721.2/sq mi (278.47/km^{2})
- Time zone: UTC−8 (Pacific (PST))
  - Summer (DST): UTC−7 (PDT)
- ZIP Code: 98593
- Area code: 360, 564
- FIPS code: 53-73780
- GNIS feature ID: 2412140
- Website: vaderwa.org

Vader is a city in Lewis County, Washington, United States. The community began in the 1870s and was known under several different names during its early years. Vader was most recognizably known as Little Falls, after a waterfall on nearby Olequa Creek, until an official name change to Vader in 1913. The city's moniker has remained an issue, with unsuccessful votes held in the 21st century to convert back to Little Falls.

Incorporated under the name of Little Falls in 1906, the early town grew largely out of logging and clay manufacturing at the turn of the 20th century, growing to a population that was reported to have reached as high as 5,000 people, despite census records failing to support the numbers. The city became known as Vader, after an American Civil War veteran and resident, in 1913. In the 1910s, several fires decimated the sawmill and factory industries of the community which led to a decades-long decline to Vader's population and economy. By the 2000s, a lack of funding closed the local school and educational district.

In the 21st century, community efforts have been undertaken to rejuvenate the economic conditions of the city. Several projects began to highlight the logging history of Vader as well as showcase historic buildings, such as Old City Jail, and two National Register of Historic Places structures, the Ben Olsen House and Grace Evangelical Church of Vader. Two parks were created and the community has continued to hold an annual May Day Festival, first begun in the 1950s.

According to the 2020 census, Vader's population rebounded to a level not recorded since 1910.

== Etymology ==
The community was platted under the name Kraft after Paul Kraft, a postmaster in Lewis County. The early town became known as Little Falls after the waterfalls of the same name on Olequa Creek. The name was changed to Sopenah by the Northern Pacific Railway after it refused to recognize the moniker because there was already a Little Falls, Minnesota. (Note: Northern Pacific preemptively hung a Sopenah sign on the local depot during discussions over the name of the town.) The townspeople were unsatisfied with the new name and petitioned the Washington State Legislature to change it to Toledo (Note: Other news reporting on the early days of the Little Falls-Vader name debate mention residents suggested "Toronto" as an alternative. See sources in the section for the discrepancy.) but several communities with that title already existed in the United States, not solving the concern over naming confusion. The dispute continued which was resolved by a compromise agreement to name the town after Martin Vader, a German resident, and American Civil War veteran. The town name was officially changed to Vader by the legislature on March 25, 1913. Vader later moved to California or Florida where a myth began that he did not care for the recognition; later reporting stated that he was proud of the honor.

Twice in the 21st century motions have been made to change the community's moniker back to its original name, Little Falls, due to a variety of concerns such as the name of Vader did not encapsulate the meaning of the town, or that the title of Little Falls would be more inviting from a tourism and visitor standpoint. The issue was added to the ballot in 2005 and 2015 to determine voter approval; both attempts failed. In the 2015 vote, 131 residents voted against the change and 73 in favor; costs over the change to highway signage was deemed a significant concern. (Note: Other sourcing lists the 2015 name-change vote as 108 in favor and 64 opposed.) The mayor at the time, Ken Smith, stated that Vader could remain a beneficial moniker considering the connection to Darth Vader of Star Wars.

== History ==
=== Beginnings and 20th century ===
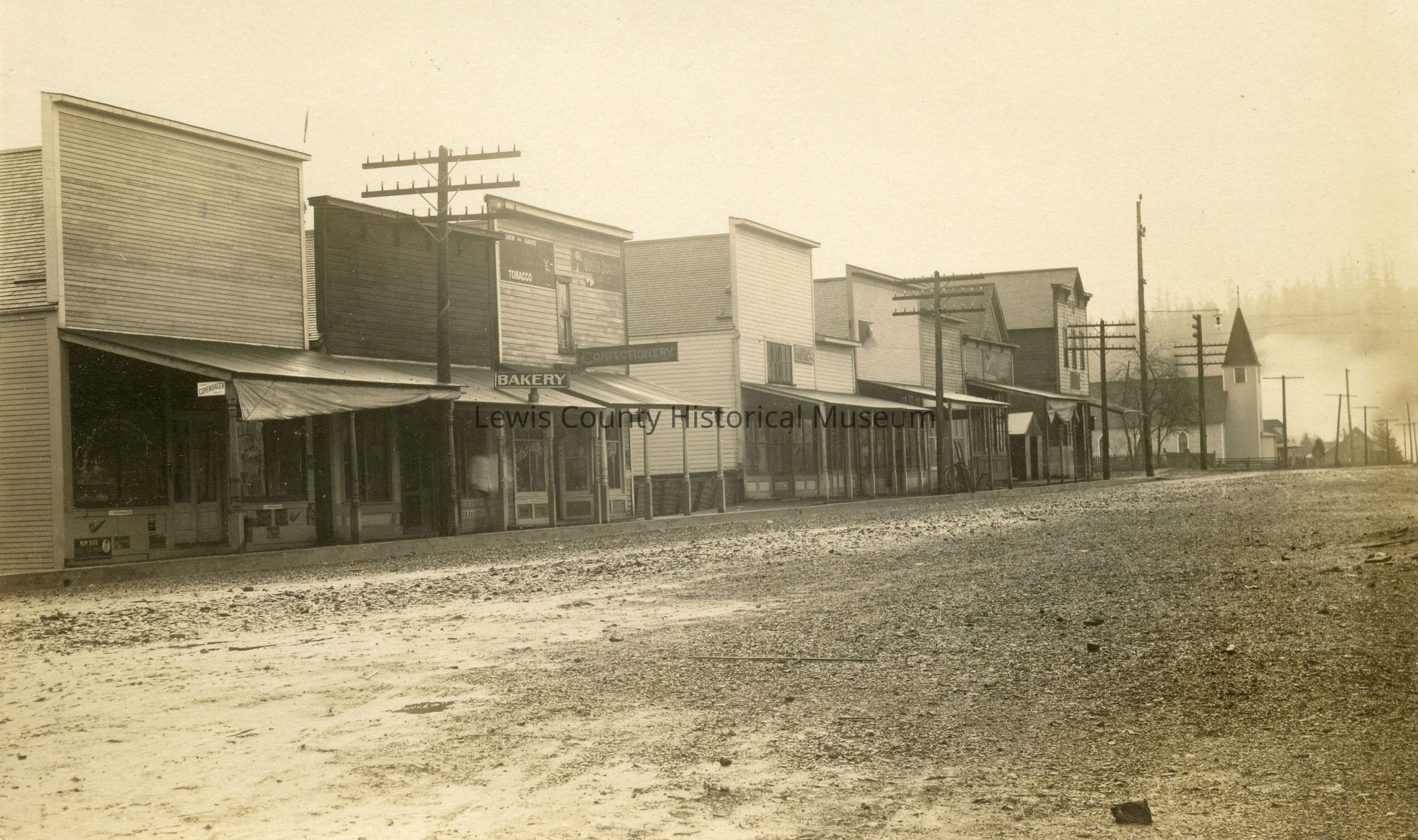
Downtown Vader, early 1900s

After Little Falls was formed, the town was considered one of the largest communities between Portland and Tacoma. The town was incorporated as a "fourth class" city under the Little Falls name on January 12, 1906; only one resident out of 78 voted against incorporation. The first mayor was W.R. Diley. During its peak between 1890 and 1920, Vader hosted over 40 businesses, contained two churches, and had a hospital. Along with a local newspaper, businesses included a bowling alley, an opera house, several saloons, and the Vader Moving Picture Theater.

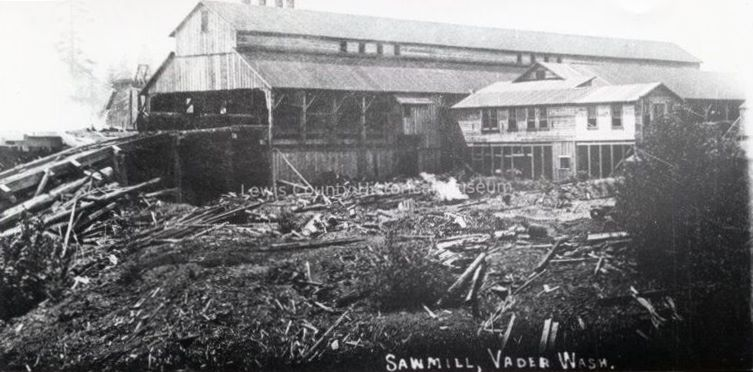
Stillwater Lumber and Shingle Mill, c.1913–1918

The seven Olson brothers, (Note: The last name is often, if not overwhelmingly so, spelled as Olson, however some accounts use the name written as Olsen. See sources throughout the section for the discrepancy.) notably Ben Olsen of the Ben Olsen House, began the Stillwater Logging and Lumber Company; the company operated a sawmill in Vader beginning in late December 1907, at its peak employing as many as 180 men. Olsen also formed a partnership, the Little Falls Water Company, to supply water to the Little Falls community in the early 1910s.

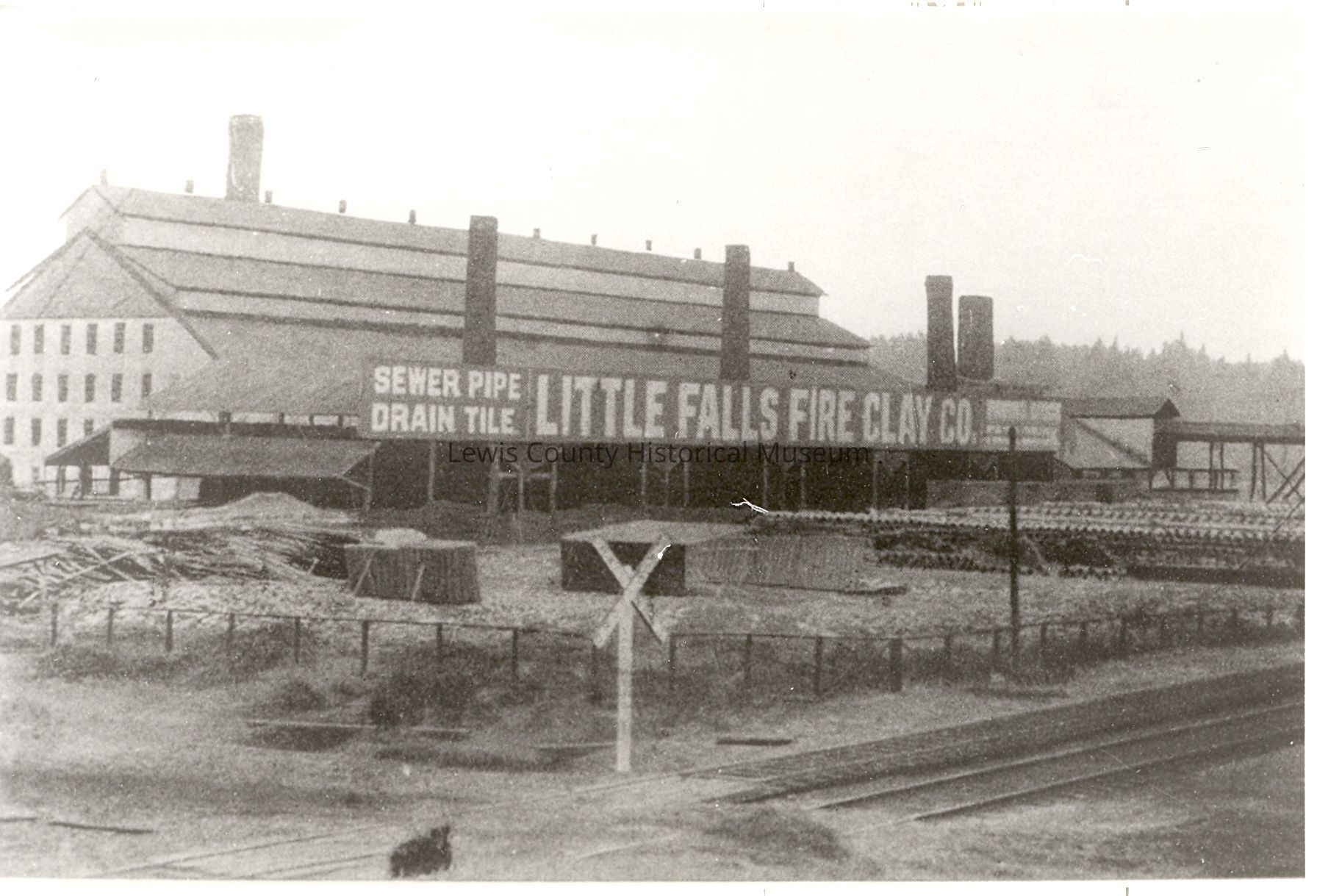
Little Falls Fire Clay Company, c. 1895

The Stillwater lumber mill was purchased by Weyerhaeuser in 1914. Despite the facility having a fire suppression system in place by 1915, the mill burned down on the evening of January 11, 1916; damages were estimated between $30,000 and $100,000. The mill was rebuilt but burned down again on the night of September 1, 1918. The fire began from an explosion in the boiler room when new equipment was being installed. Though the plane mill and dry kiln areas survived, the loss of timber and a rail engine were substantial. Damages were estimated at $125,000; the mill had only $35,000 in insurance coverage. A formal announcement was made the following month that the mill would not be rebuilt. The Stillwater timber holdings were sold to the Winlock Lumber Company, however, Stillwater's logging operations were briefly resumed in March 1919. One attempt to rebuild the mill was announced in December 1919. The effort did not materialize.

The population may have reached as high as 5,000 residents during its peak though official census records dispute the claim. The Little Falls Fire Clay Factory was operational in the early 1900s. Manufacturing a variety of clay products such as bricks and sewer pipes, the plant shut down after it was destroyed during a fire in 1914. A new, but smaller clay production facility began in 1920 but another fire decimated the factory in 1925. Various disasters and loss of employment from the closure of the clay factory and sawmill led to a decline to the town.

=== 21st century ===
City of Vader welcome sign, 2024

As part of a ten-year plan to rejuvenate Vader, the first cell phone tower was erected in the city in 2003. Additional efforts included the additions of parks, the creation of an historic walking tour, and the renovation of the downtown core which introduced elements to recreate the community as a 1910 logging town.

Vader celebrated its centennial in July 2006, intentionally delaying the celebration in hopes for a larger turnout and a more "party atmosphere".

== Geography ==
In 2026, the City of Vader annexed into the city limits most of its Urban Growth Area, growing the city from 0.93 square miles (2.4 km^{2}) to 1.36 square miles (3.5 km^{2}).

== Demographics ==
Historical population
Census	Pop.	Note	%±
1910	631		—
1920	500		−20.8%
1930	465		−7.0%
1940	479		3.0%
1950	426		−11.1%
1960	380		−10.8%
1970	387		1.8%
1980	406		4.9%
1990	414		2.0%
2000	590		42.5%
2010	621		5.3%
2020	629		1.3%
U.S. Decennial Census; 2020 Census

After the 2026 annexation, the population in Vader increased from 710 to 914 residents.

=== 2020 census ===
As of the 2020 census, Vader had a population of 629, the highest count since the 1920 census; this count appears in the 2020 Census Redistricting Data (Public Law 94-171) Summary File. The median age was 38.2 years, 26.2% of residents were under the age of 18, and 19.9% were 65 years of age or older. For every 100 females there were 111.1 males, and for every 100 females age 18 and over there were 100.9 males age 18 and over.

There were 239 households in Vader, of which 36.8% had children under the age of 18 living in them. Of all households, 44.8% were married-couple households, 23.8% were households with a male householder and no spouse or partner present, and 21.8% were households with a female householder and no spouse or partner present. About 26.4% of all households were made up of individuals and 11.7% had someone living alone who was 65 years of age or older.

There were 256 housing units, of which 6.6% were vacant. The homeowner vacancy rate was 0.5% and the rental vacancy rate was 4.1%.

0.0% of residents lived in urban areas, while 100.0% lived in rural areas.

Racial composition as of the 2020 census
Race	Number	Percent
White	508	80.8%
Black or African American	5	0.8%
American Indian and Alaska Native	16	2.5%
Asian	9	1.4%
Native Hawaiian and Other Pacific Islander	6	1.0%
Some other race	8	1.3%
Two or more races	77	12.2%
Hispanic or Latino (of any race)	51	8.1%

=== 2010 census ===
As of the 2010 census, there were 621 people, 228 households, and 157 families living in the city. The population density was 667.7 inhabitants per square mile (257.8/km^{2}). There were 258 housing units at an average density of 277.4 per square mile (107.1/km^{2}). The racial makeup of the city was 87.9% White, 2.3% Native American, 1.0% Asian, 0.2% Pacific Islander, 1.0% from other races, and 7.7% from two or more races. Hispanic or Latino of any race were 4.5% of the population.

There were 228 households, of which 32.9% had children under the age of 18 living with them, 52.2% were married couples living together, 10.1% had a female householder with no husband present, 6.6% had a male householder with no wife present, and 31.1% were non-families. 24.6% of all households were made up of individuals, and 11.8% had someone living alone who was 65 years of age or older. The average household size was 2.72 and the average family size was 3.18.

The median age in the city was 41.4 years. 24.2% of residents were under the age of 18; 8.8% were between the ages of 18 and 24; 21.8% were from 25 to 44; 29.2% were from 45 to 64; and 16.1% were 65 years of age or older. The gender makeup of the city was 52.8% male and 47.2% female.

== Arts and culture ==
=== Festivals and events ===
City of Vader history mural, 2025

Vader has hosted an annual event known as the May Day Festival since 1952 which is held on the first Saturday of May. The celebration includes a maypole dance and a parade. It began through the actions of Lena DeAger, a leader of a local Girl Scout troop, and the first years included scouts parading on decorated bicycles and wagons. Over the years, the festival has incorporated car shows, a cake walk, and the coronation of a May Day Queen, who used to be elected based on the most money collected through donation jars.

Vader hosts the Red, White and Boom festival, a fireworks show held every Fourth of July. The festival, begun by four Vader residents in 2009, is reported to be the largest fireworks display in Lewis County. A car show, known as Hell on Wheels, is also part of the annual festivities.

=== Historic buildings and sites ===
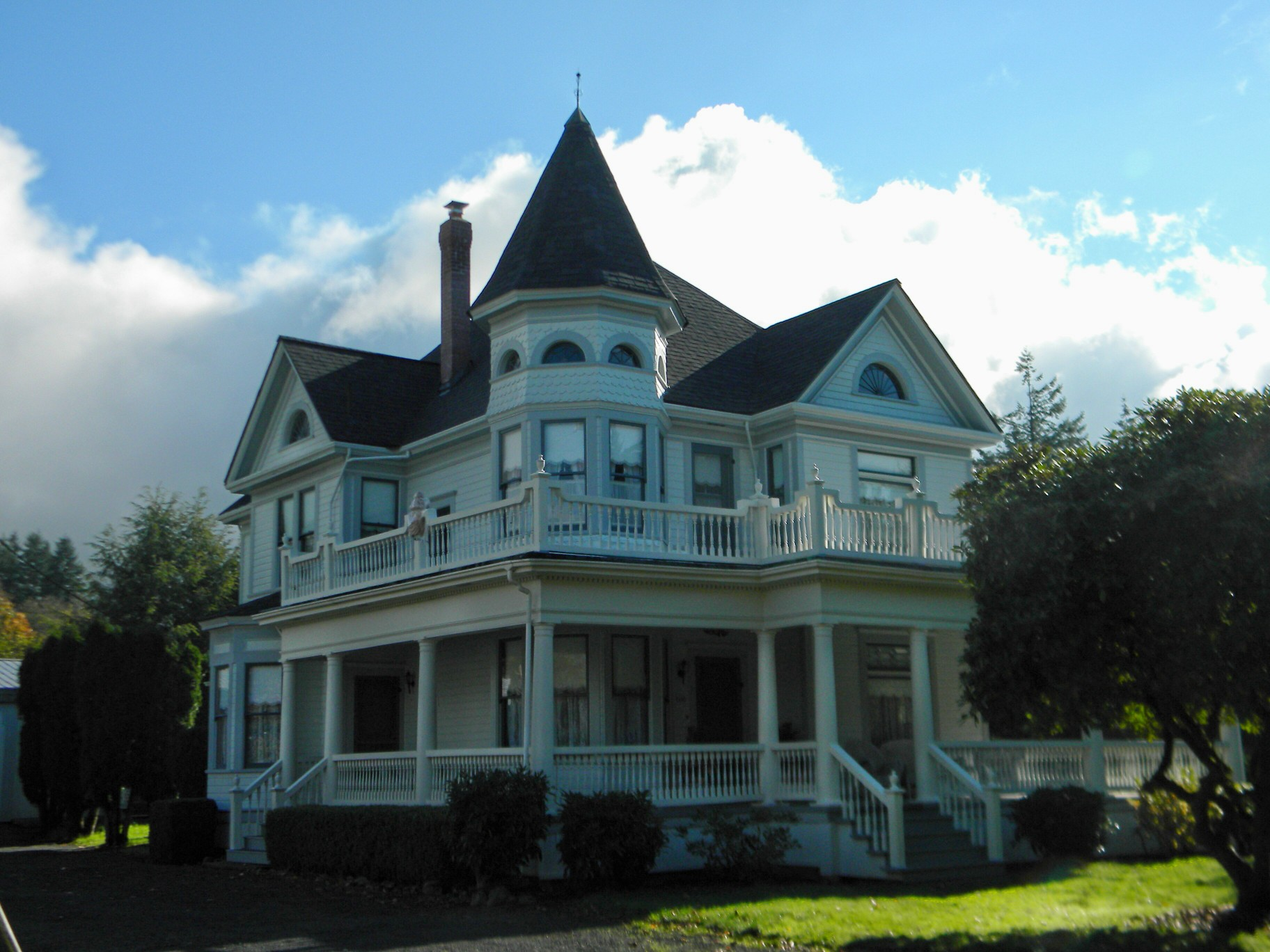
Ben Olsen House, 2014

The city is home to the Gothic-style Grace Evangelical Church of Vader, a National Register of Historic Places recognized building that is in current use under the United Methodist Church.

A second building within Vader is also listed with the NRHP, the Ben Olsen House. The mansion was built in 1903 to serve the Olsen family who owned the Stillwater Lumber Co. and Mill; it was the first home in the community to have electricity.

== Parks and recreation ==
Vader is home to McMurphy Park, a 13-acre (5.3 ha) parcel donated in 2001 by Dolores McMurphy, a former resident. Located north of the main hub of the town, it is bordered by Olequa Creek and the Little Falls of Vader, and a portion of the park is outside the city limits. The grounds were built up to be a park by community efforts, finishing most of the early efforts in 2007. Plans for the site include an amphitheater, ball fields, playgrounds, and camping and picnic amenities. As part of the donation, a large black walnut tree was to be left standing.

J.K. Werden Memorial Park became an official park in Vader in 2005 and is situated near the downtown core. Originally 175 ft × 120 ft (53 m × 37 m) in size, a land purchase approved in late 2015, and paid for by a $10,000 grant, doubled the park area. The parcel received upgrades in 2009 for bathroom and kitchen facilities, a basketball court was built in 2015, and new playground equipment in 2021, similar to Penny Playground in Chehalis. The park is also home to Vader's Old City Jail.

McMurphy Park, 2024

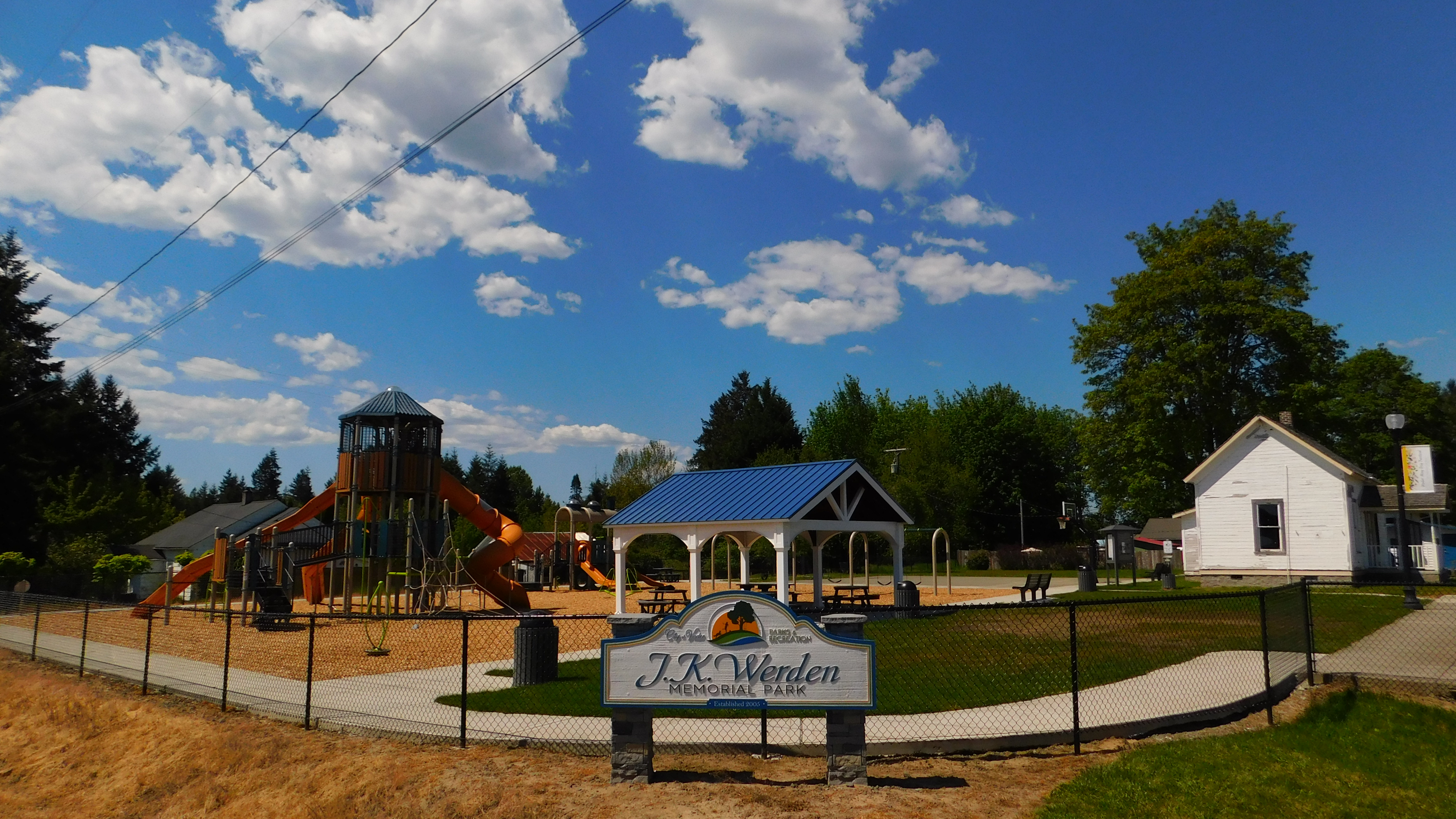
J.K. Werden Memorial Park, 2024

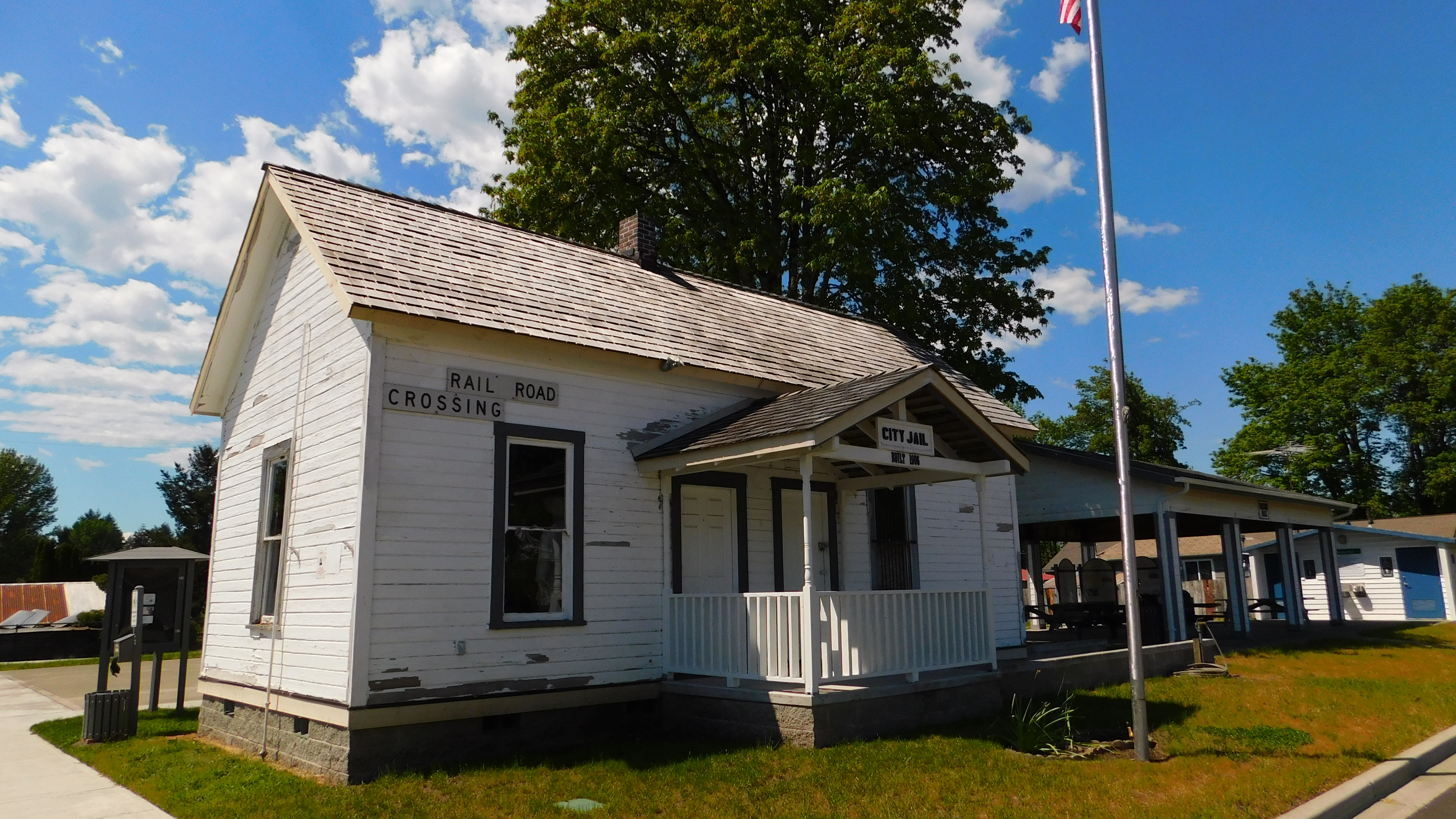
Old City Jail, 2024

== Politics ==
Presidential Elections Results
Year	Republican	Democratic	Third parties
2008	50.2% 136	47.2% 128	2.6% 7
2012	48.7% 114	46.2% 108	5.1% 12
2016	53.6% 125	38.2% 89	8.2% 19
2020	58.5% 175	37.5% 112	4.0% 12
2024	64.0% 194	33.7% 102	2.3% 7

=== Government ===
The city council for Vader is composed of five at-large, non-partisan members who, along with the mayor, are elected to serve four-year terms.

=== Voting ===
The 2020 election included 8 votes for candidates of the Libertarian Party. In the 2024 election, there were 2 votes cast for write-in candidates.

== Education ==
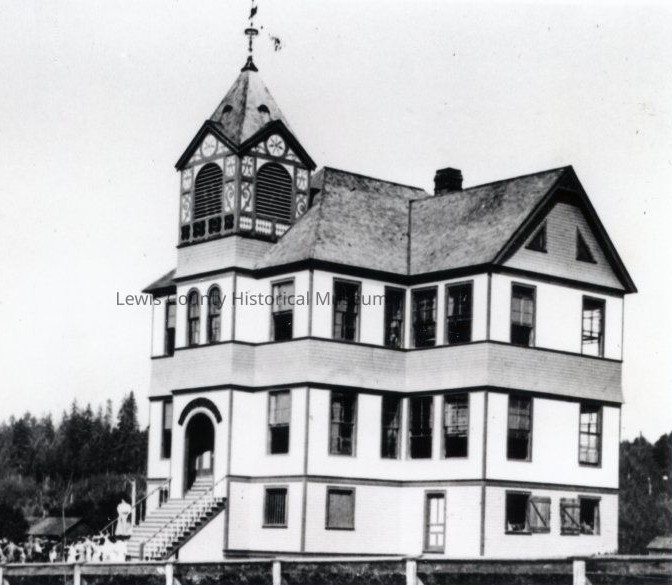
Little Falls Public School, c. 1900s

The first school in Little Falls-Vader was a schoolhouse constructed near the falls. The one-room school building existed before the build of a second school in 1892. A two-story schoolhouse, for up to eighth grade, was built in 1930 and replaced with another school building during the 1950s.

The Vader school district and the 1950s grade school closed officially in August 2007 after a local levy and bond measure failed. The measures were meant to fund maintenance and operations at the school and improve the safety of the campus; a bond to cover the cost of demolition was also unsuccessful. Students were transported to a temporary school in Toledo. The Vader school district was absorbed under the oversight of the Castle Rock district but students are allowed to choose to attend schools in more nearby locations.

== Infrastructure ==
Little Falls of Olequa Creek, at McMurphy Park, 2024

The drinking water source for the Vader-Enchanted Valley Water System is the Cowlitz River. The city discharges waste water from the sewage treatment plant to Olequa Creek.

== Notable people ==
- Robert Cantwell, novelist and critic
- Herbert Heyes, silent film actor
