= Siler =

Siler may refer to:

== People ==
- Brandon Siler, American football linebacker
- Eugene Siler, American politician
- Harry A. Siler, American politician
- Howard Siler, American bobsledder
- Jenny Siler, American novelist
- Joseph Franklin Siler, U.S. Army physician and dengue researcher
- Lester Eugene Siler, convicted drug dealer
- Owen W. Siler, admiral in the United States Coast Guard
- Ronald Siler, American amateur boxer
- Todd Siler, American visual artist, author, educator and inventor

== Places in the United States ==
- Siler, Knox County, Kentucky, an unincorporated community
- Siler, Whitley County, Kentucky, an unincorporated community
- Siler, Virginia, an unincorporated community
- Siler City, North Carolina, a town

== Other uses ==
- Siler (plant), a genus in the family Apiaceae
- Siler (spider), a genus of jumping spiders
- Siler (Stargate), a character in the Stargate franchise

== See also ==
- Sylar, a villain in the TV series Heroes
