= Bremerton National Airport =

Airport near Bremerton, Washington, US

Bremerton Executive Airport
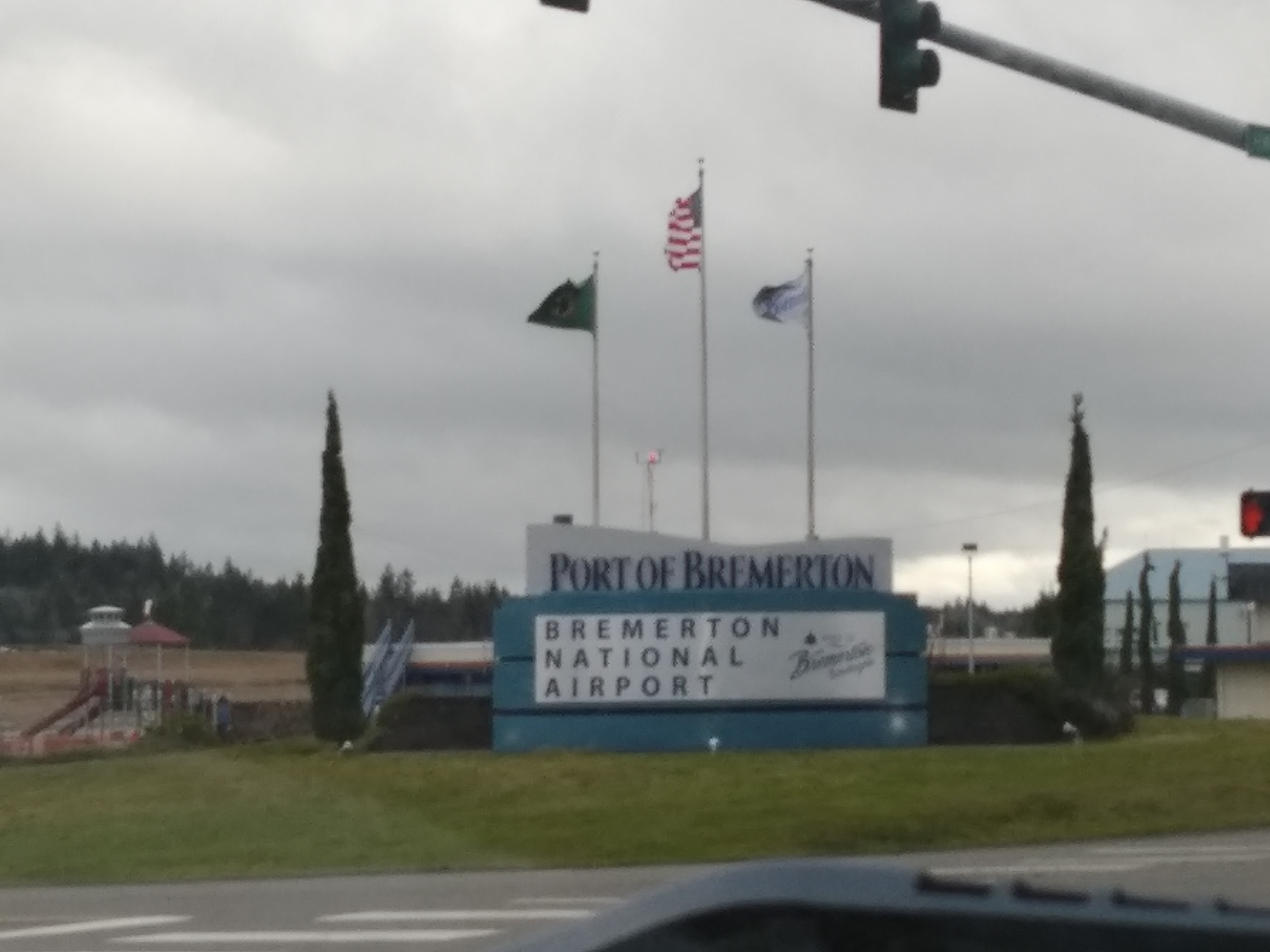
- IATA: PWT; ICAO: KPWT; FAA LID: PWT

Summary
- Airport type: Public
- Owner: Port of Bremerton
- Serves: Bremerton, Washington
- Elevation AMSL: 444 ft (135 m)
- Coordinates: 47°29′25″N 122°45′53″W
- Website: Port of Bremerton website

Map
- Location in Washington PWT (the United States)

Runways
Direction	Length		Surface
Direction	ft	m	Surface
2/20	6,000	1,829	Asphalt

Statistics (2019)
- Aircraft operations: 66,000
- Based aircraft: 118
- Source: Federal Aviation Administration

Bremerton Executive Airport (IATA: PWT, ICAO: KPWT, FAA LID: PWT) is eight miles southwest of downtown Bremerton, in Kitsap County, Washington. It is owned by the Port of Bremerton. The Executive Plan of Integrated Airport Systems for 2011–2015 categorized it as a general aviation facility.

It is the largest airport on the Kitsap Peninsula with an all-weather, fully lit 6,000-foot runway. It was known as Kitsap County Airport until July 1, 1983.

== History ==
In 1936, about 15 local residents founded an airport, then known as Fleet Field which later became Bremerton National Airport. They turned an old lakebed known as Bayes' Bog into a 600-foot-long, 15-foot-wide gravel landing strip. During World War II, Kitsap County Airport was used by the United States Navy as an outer landing field for NAS Seattle. Military use continued throughout the Cold War and it would occasionally host temporary detachments of aircraft from the Navy.

The taxiways and runways of the Kitsap County Airport hosted a NASCAR Grand National (now Cup Series) event, on August 4, 1957, for the 1957 NASCAR season. Parnelli Jones won in a Oscar Maples Ford.

The airport has a second runway which has been closed for some time and is currently used as a drag strip by Bremerton Motorsports Park. In 1954, Kitsap County Airport was the site for the SCCA Seafair Nationals. This was Ferrari's debut on a Northwest track at a time when the company was just starting to dominate west coast sports car racing.

In 2019, the airport was described as a potential candidate for expansion as part of Washington State's Department of Transportation effort to expand commercial airport space in the Puget Sound region. In July 2020, the Commercial Aviation Coordinating Committee (CACC) announced that they would submit a shortlist of expansion candidates within the year, and in December 2020, Bremerton National Airport was placed on the shortlist, along with Arlington Municipal Airport, Paine Field, Sanderson Field, Tacoma Narrows Airport, and South Lewis County Airport.

On April 29, 2021, the CACC released a white paper detailing the benefits of each site. While Bremerton National Airport was described as being able to "provide additional general aviation aircraft storage capacity and expand business aviation support", the CACC was concerned about the distance between the airport and major interstates, including the travel time between counties.

== Facilities ==
The airport covers 1,729 acres (700 ha) at an elevation of 444 feet (135 m). Its one runway, 2/20, is 6,000 by 150 feet (1,829 x 46 m) asphalt.

In the year ending December 31, 2019, the airport had 66,000 aircraft operations, averaging 181 per day: 98% general aviation, 1% military, and <1% air taxi. 118 aircraft were then based at this airport: 105 single-engine, 6 multi-engine, 3 jet, 3 helicopter, and 1 glider.

== Accidents and incidents ==
- On September 1, 1997, a Cessna 182 Skylane being used for a skydiving excursion crashed shortly after takeoff from Bremerton National Airport due to engine issues, killing all five people on board.

== See also ==
- List of airports in Washington
