= Port of Chehalis =

Port authority in Chehalis, Washington

Coordinates: 46°37′38″N 122°54′31″W

Agency overview
- Formed: September 16, 1986
- Jurisdiction: Lewis County, Washington
- Headquarters: 321 Maurin Rd. Chehalis, Washington, U.S.
- Annual budget: Operating budget, $905,862; Capital budget, $5.4 million (2026)
- Website: portofchehalis.com

The Port of Chehalis is a local government agency that oversees industrial zones, including an industrial park of the same name, in the city of Chehalis, Washington.

The port grew out of an industrial park that was begun and constructed in the mid-1950s by groups of local Chehalis residents. The Chehalis Industrial Park was created out of necessity due to job losses, as well as a declining timber industry, in the city. A new rail line was built on the grounds and Goodyear Tire became the first tenant in 1957. The industrial site was operated as a private operation with several attempts to create a port district into the 1980s.

In 1986, the Port of Chehalis was established and remains one of the last port districts created in Washington state. Since the port's beginnings, the agency has expanded the original Chehalis Industrial Park grounds and has added additional sites and landholdings.

== History ==
=== Beginnings, Chehalis Industrial Park ===
A 1952 fire at a pharmaceutical company that was the largest employer in Chehalis led to the formation of a community group known as "Adventure in Cooperation". In addition to a fire at a wood shingle mill in 1953, and the continuation of job losses in the city in the mid-1950s due to a decline in timber production, the volunteer initiative formed the Chehalis Industrial Commission (CIC) in 1956 which created the Chehalis Industrial Park (CIP). The commission was formed after the Adventure in Cooperation volunteers, which included contributors from the local Boy Scouts troop, churches, garden clubs, schools, and businesses, undertook a resource-and-needs inventory of the city. Realizing the potential for an industrial area, shares were sold to approximately 1,000 people at $50 each. The money was used to purchase the first parcel, measuring 137 acres (55 ha), officially creating the industrial zone.

Goodyear Tire showed interest in the new park but required a rail line to connect the area to the local railroad hubs. A new 3,500-foot (1,100-metre) rail line, built by a group of local volunteers known as the "Gandy Dancers", was connected to the grounds in 1957, signally the beginnings of the park. Funds to construct the spur were raised by Chehalis residents, individually purchasing the 1,600 area-logged rail ties for $4 each. The $1.0 million Goodyear Tire plant opened in August 1957 and became the first tenant.

The 18-member CIC ran the park as a private port, undertaking responsibilities for purchasing additional land, managing the grounds, and recruiting businesses. The commission, due in part to private financing, also had the authority to negotiate water rights and construct roads. An attempt to created a port district in the county failed in a public vote in 1960. In the 1970s, the CIC began coordinating with state and federal agencies to build a connection from the industrial park to Interstate 5 (I-5), known as the Labree Road interchange.

A proposal was introduced in August 1976 to the commissioners of Lewis County outlining a county port district that would have connected to four other adjacent counties. Although there were positive estimations in regards to an increase in new jobs, and various statements of economic growth and regional cooperation and efficiency, the measure was considered dubious due to burdensome tax laws and zoning issues. Despite some approval from county department leaders, the commissioner board saw the need of a port as a "local issue".

=== Port of Chehalis ===
An amendment to a state law to allow public ports within a county was passed by legislative action in March 1986. Another public vote was called and the creation of a port district in the city was accepted by residents; it passed by a margin of 76 votes. The Port of Chehalis was officially established in September 1986; along with the Port of Centralia, it was one of the last ports created in the state. (Note: A third port, to be located in the Toledo and Winlock area, was proposed in 1986 along with the Centralia and Chehalis ports but failed to materialize after a public vote defeated the measure.)

The port, in 1996, helped purchase rail tracks in the area for the Chehalis–Centralia Railroad via a $420,000 grant from the Washington State Department of Transportation (WSDOT). That same year, the port expanded and created another industrial area known as the Curtis Industrial Park; the 40-acre (16 ha) Curtis zone was annexed under the Port of Chehalis authority.

Engineering and design of the Labree Road interchange began in the late 1990s and the state budgeted over $41 million for a widening project on I-5 between offramps near the port. The effort, which also included the build a new main road to Chehalis Industrial Park, was officially approved in 2004 by the Federal Highway Administration. The connection was constructed beginning in 2007 and officially opened in June 2009.

== Port management and oversight ==
The Port of Chehalis is run by a commission of elected officers and the district boundaries mirror that of the Chehalis School District. The first commissioners, elected in 1986, were Bill Brooks, Ed Pemerl, and Bill Wiester.

The agency oversees the Chehalis Industrial Park and the port, along with the Centralia authority, is part of the South Puget Sound Foreign Trade Zone since 1996. The port is responsible for acquiring land within the district, particularly at the Chehalis Industrial Park. Sites are prepared for future business entities that the port signs to contracts and land in the industrial zone is leased to corporations and businesses.

The port is a taxing authority and began collecting levies in 1988. Initial proposals attempted to put the Chehalis-Centralia Airport under the port's authority but the airfield remained under its own management due to its financial sustainability, and remained under the oversight of the city government.

== Economics ==
Revenue and expenses for 2026 includes two separate budget categories. An operating budget includes expected revenue from cash, debt, and taxes to be over $905,000; expenses are expected to be the same, creating a net profit or loss of $0. Revenue under the port's capital budget, the agency expects $5.4 million in grants from various state and federal agencies or committees for environmental and industrial site projects under the authority of the Port of Chehalis.

== Properties ==
The Port of Chehalis owns and manages two main sites, the Chehalis and Curtis industrial zones, as well as undeveloped grounds, including properties in the Boistfort Valley. In 2011, the port recorded management of a combined 1,057 acres (428 ha) of industrial-use land holdings.

=== Chehalis Industrial Park ===
The Chehalis Industrial Park (CIP) is located south of the city district near Interstate 5. The CIP expanded up to 160 acres (65 ha) by 1993 and after extensive infrastructure preparation at an estimated cost of $1.9 million, the grounds were considered complete and ready for occupancy in 1995. The first official port tenant was Fred Meyer which constructed a distribution warehouse. The site was recorded as encompassing 700 acres (280 ha) and was home to 30 businesses in 2008.

Due to the lowland nature of the industrial zone, the port, along with an early tenant, created a stormwater retention pond. This early attempt to control flooding and drainage issues led to the port, in association with agencies at the state and federal levels and with the U.S. Army Corps of Engineers, to begin floodplain mitigation efforts in 2008. Through an expedited process, the Port of Chehalis created a 66-acre (27 ha) wetland preserve and basin known as Pleasant Valley, south of Washington State Route 6 (SR 6).

The port finished construction on a 20,000-square-foot (1,900 m^{2}) facility in 2020. Known as the Pemerl Building, one of its first tenants was Mt. Capra Products, founded as a dairy company in 1928 and located in Chehalis.

==== Southwest Washington Grain Project ====
In 2017, a local vegetable processing company no longer accepted contracts from regional farmers causing difficulties in the transportation of crops outside of the area. Two years later, farmers and government agencies in Southwest Washington formed an alliance to construct a grain transload facility at the industrial park; beginning with a county fund of $800,000, groundbreaking was held in April 2025. As of 2026, the storage site, which is also available for public use, has a capacity of up to 12,600 US bushels (440 m^{3}) and a transfer rate of up to 7,500 US bushels (260 m^{3}) per hour. The facility contains six bins with a maximum load between 500 metric tons (500 t) and 600 metric tons (600 t), with three smaller bins able to carry up to 60 metric tons (60 t).

The grain transload site is part of a larger expansion known as the Southwest Washington Grain Project (SWGP). The facility allows farmers in the region to more easily store and transport their grain at the CIP site, which began with a new rail spur and temporary conveyor system in 2020. Funding was provided by a variety of sources, including $1.75 million from the state in 2020, and in 2025, over $3 million from the Economic Development Administration and more than $4 million in federal funding.

The first delivery to the bins, as part of a test of the facility, was a load of barley in January 2026. The Southwest Washington Grain Project was officially opened during a dedication ceremony in June 2026. Several officials, including Marie Gluesenkamp Perez, spoke at the event which included farmers as well as staff members from the Port of Chehalis.

=== Port of Chehalis Hydrogen Production & Fueling Station ===
The first hydrogen fueling station in Washington state, known as the Port of Chehalis Hydrogen Production & Fueling Station, was planned to be constructed on port property. Under the oversight of Lewis County Transit, the project was originally scheduled to be finished in 2023 but was rescheduled to late 2025. The opening of the Port of Chehalis Hydrogen Production & Fueling Station was again shifted into spring 2026.

A groundbreaking ceremony for the $9.7 million project was held in August 2025 at the station's Bishop Road site. Funding was provided by a mix of local and state agencies, foundations, and grants. Hydrogen fuel will be produced using a "green electrolyte" process, with up to 750 kilograms (1,650 pounds) per day for the Lewis County transit bus fleet and up to 1,250 kilograms (2,760 pounds) per day for other transit fleets in the region.

== Employment ==
As of 2011, the industrial parks in the Chehalis and Curtis zones were home to over 50 businesses that employed a combined 2,500 workers.
