= Eveline =

Eveline may refer to:

- Eveline (given name)
- "Eveline" (short story), a short story by James Joyce
- Eveline, Missouri, United States
- Eveline Street, in Windhoek, Namibia
- Eveline Township, Michigan, United States

== See also ==
- Evaline (disambiguation)
- Evelyn (disambiguation)
