= Evaline =

Evaline may refer to:

- Evaline, Washington, US
- Evaline Hilda Burkitt, British suffragette
- Evaline Ness, American artist

== See also ==
- Eveline (disambiguation)
