= Ron Resch =

American computer scientist

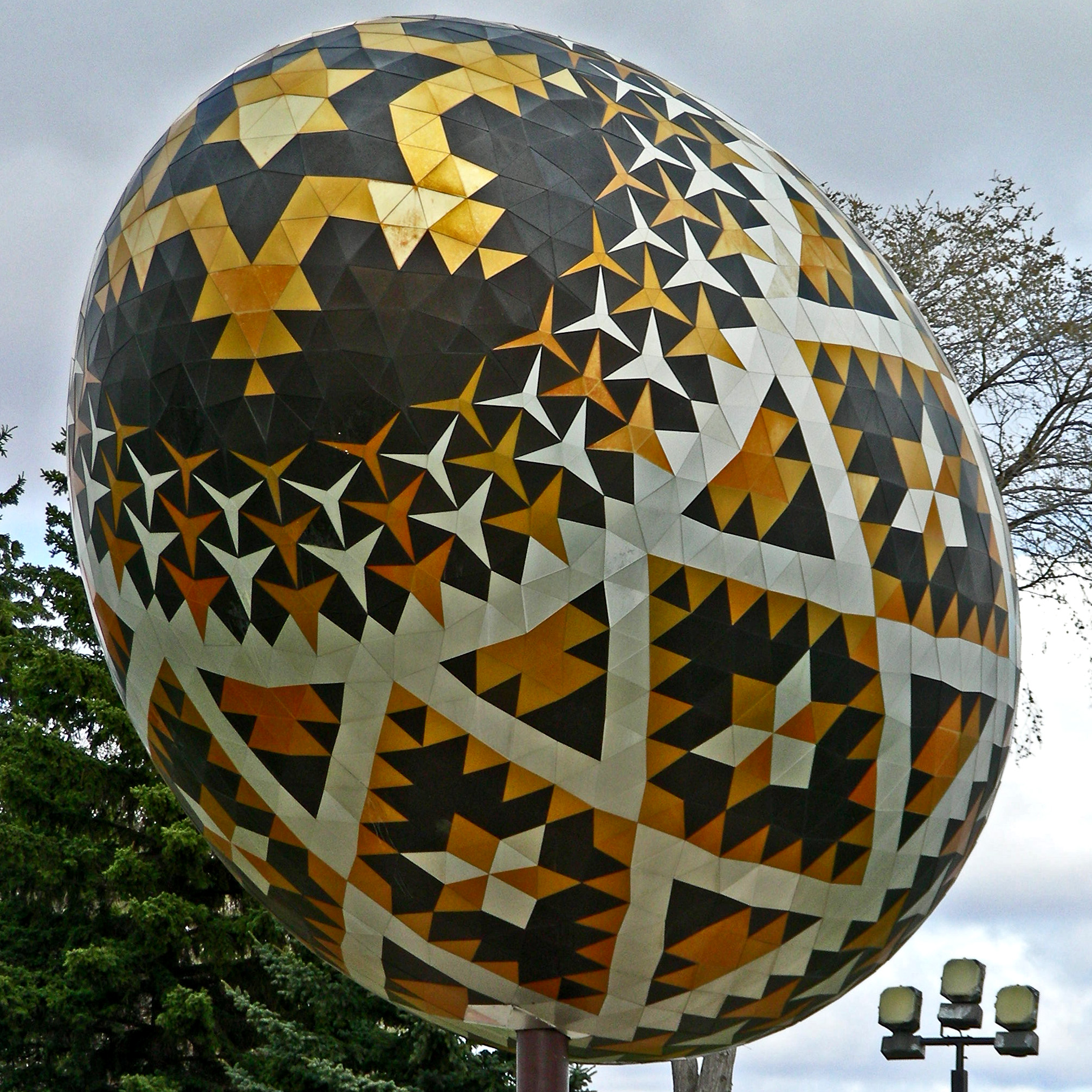
- Vegreville egg
- Born: Ronald Dale Resch; 1939
- Died: November 24, 2009 (aged 69–70)

Ron Resch (Ronald Dale Resch, September 2, 1939 – November 24, 2009) was an artist, computer scientist, and applied geometrist, known for his work involving folded paper, origami tessellations and polyhedral structures.

== Early life and education ==
Resch was born and raised in Independence, Missouri. He was a three-letter athlete in high school (football, basketball, and track) but was unable to continue in sports due to a heart murmur detected in his junior year. He studied art at the University of Iowa, receiving a BA in 1963 and a Master of Fine Arts in 1966.

== Career ==
From 1966-1969 he held various positions at the University of Illinois at Urbana-Champaign, eventually becoming assistant professor of both architecture and computer science, and was affiliated with the Coordinated Science Laboratory. He went on to become a research associate professor of computer science at the University of Utah from 1969-1978. At Boston University (1978-1984) he was director of the Computer Graphics Center and Associate Research Professor in the Department of Computer Science.

Beginning in 1985, Resch turned to consulting and research positions in industry, including time with Evans & Sutherland (Salt Lake City), Pearce Systems International (Chatsworth, CA), and Filoli Information Systems (Palo Alto, CA; later acquired by Xerox).

== Notable achievements ==
In 1970, Resch released a 43-minute film, originally titled The Ron Resch Paper and Stick Thing Film, and re-released on video in 1992 as The Ron Resch Paper and Stick Film. It documents his comprehensive 1960-1966 investigation of the structures obtainable in, and derived from, folded paper. Starting from the simple question, "What happens to a sheet of paper when you wad it up?", the film shows Resch patiently exploring the variations and possibilities of polyhedral structures, ultimately creating sophisticated computer-graphic representations (in the era of punched cards and drum plotters).

In 1974 the community of Vegreville, Alberta, Canada, commissioned him to create a permanent public monument, comprising a sculpture, over 30 ft (9 m) high, of a pysanka or Ukrainian Easter egg, bearing a traditional design by Paul Maxym Sembaliuk. For the Vegreville egg, Resch and graduate students at the University of Utah developed a new geometry system and computer programming to support it. The pysanka sculpture was completed and dedicated in July 1975, and dedicated a second time by Queen Elizabeth II and Prince Philip in October 1978.

Between 1976 and 1980, Resch worked on a project for NASA's Langely Research Center to develop innovative ways to package a 100-meter focusing parabolic antenna so as to fit into the hold of the Space Shuttle.

For the 1979 film Star Trek: The Motion Picture, Resch designed the mouth of the alien spaceship that swallows the starship Enterprise; the brief from the producers was "to make it look both organic and high-tech."

In 1990 he was called as an expert witness in a patent infringement case between plaintiff ADO Ampex and defendant Abekas ("Ampex v. Abekas"). Hopkins Carley, the defense legal research team, determined that Resch, in a 1970 computer animated "fly-through" of an architectural design, was the first person to have demonstrated computer-assisted key-frame animation with the inbetweening accomplished by cubic spline interpolation.

== Legacy ==
Ron Resch's work influenced and inspired many, including structural engineer William F. Baker, film director and visual effects supervisor Douglas Trumbull, Adobe Systems founder John Warnock, and Pixar co-founder Ed Catmull. Paper artist Mitya Miller, mathematician Erik Demaine, and physicist and origami master Robert J. Lang have acknowledged Resch's work.
