= Lawrence D. Bell Aircraft Museum =

Lawrence D. Bell Aircraft Museum Museum
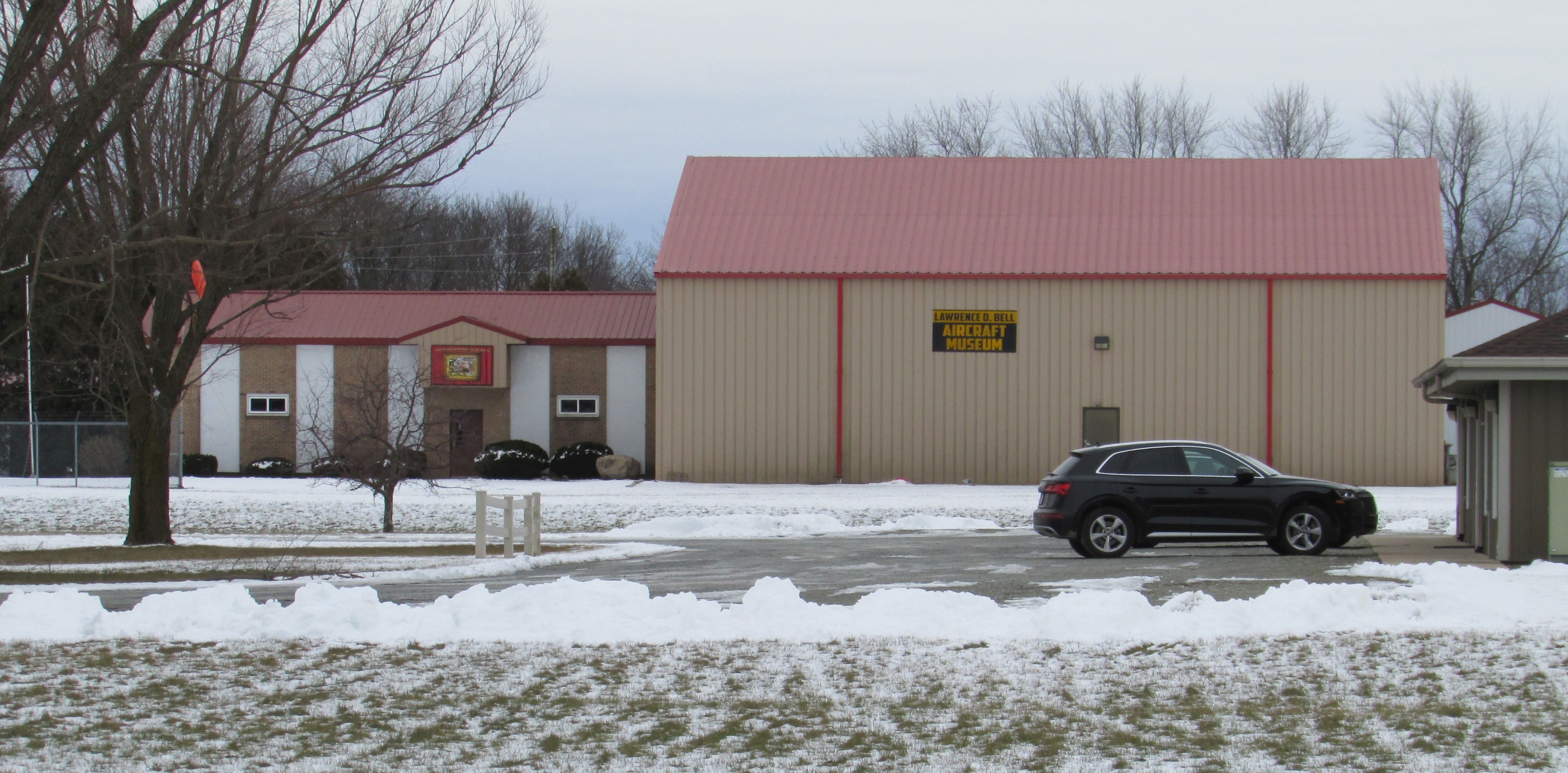

- Location within Indiana
- Established: 1972
- Location: Mentone, Indiana
- Coordinates: 41.171°N 86.042°W
- Type: Aviation museum
- Website: www.bellaircraftmuseum.org

The Lawrence D. Bell Aircraft Museum is an aviation museum located in Mentone, Indiana focused on Lawrence D. Bell.

== History ==
When Bell died in 1956, he left his personal collection of memorabilia to the town of Mentone. The museum originally opened in 1972 and fundraising began in 1976 to build a museum to house the collection. Ground was broken for the museum in May 1979 and it was dedicated on 6 June 1982.

== Exhibits ==
Exhibits include a recreation of Larry Bell's personal museum, room about the town of Mentone, library, and wall covering the development history of Bell helicopters.

== Collection ==
- Bell 47G
- Bell 47H
- Bell UH-1H Iroquois

== Events ==
The museum holds an annual fly-in called Rotors Over Mentone.

== See also ==
- List of aviation museums
