= South Lewis County Airport =

Airport in Washington state, United States

South Lewis County Airport Ed Carlson Memorial Field
- IATA: TDO; ICAO: KTDO; FAA LID: TDO

Summary
- Airport type: Public
- Owner: Lewis County
- Serves: Lewis County, Washington
- Location: Toledo / Winlock
- Elevation AMSL: 374 ft / 114 m
- Coordinates: 46°28′38″N 122°48′23″W

Map
- Location of airport in Washington TDO (the United States)

Runways
Direction	Length		Surface
Direction	ft	m	Surface
6/24	4,479	1,365	Asphalt

Statistics (2020)
- Aircraft operations: 8,300
- Based aircraft: 40
- Source: Federal Aviation Administration

South Lewis County Airport (IATA: TDO, ICAO: KTDO, FAA LID: TDO), also known as Ed Carlson Memorial Field, is a county-owned public-use airport in Lewis County, Washington, United States. It is located three nautical miles (4 mi, 6 km) north of the central business district of Toledo, Washington.

This airport is included in the FAA's National Plan of Integrated Airport Systems for 2011–2015, which categorized it as a general aviation facility.

== History ==
The airport is listed as a "public use general aviation airport" that serves Toledo and the surrounding community and region. Partially federally funded, the airfield is required to submit layout and master plans every five years. The field is also used as a primary staging site during natural disasters, providing flight access for emergency and military personnel. It was renamed in honor of Ed Carlson, a long-serving board member of the airfield.

The airport was formerly a joint venture between Toledo, Winlock, and the county. The cooperative was formed by a commission in 1950 and lasted until December 2001 when the South Lewis County Airport Board was created to manage the facility.

=== 20th century ===
South Lewis County Airport began as a 4,700 foot (1,400 metres) airstrip in 1940. Constructed by the Civil Aeronautics Administration, the more challenging crosswind runway was built for pilot training and was accompanied by a 75 foot (23 metres) communication tower in May 1941.

Land for the airport was purchased outside Toledo by the city of Winlock in 1939 and a grass runway was constructed. Known originally as the Toledo-Winlock Airport, South Lewis County Airport began as a 4,700 foot (1,400 metres) airstrip beginning in 1940. Constructed by the Civil Aeronautics Administration, the runway was built to train pilots in crosswinds and was accompanied by a 75 foot (23 metres) communication tower in May 1941. The strip was lengthened to 5,000 feet (1,524.0 m) and widened to 150 feet (45.7 m) for military planes in 1942. The airport, since its inception, was known for its "Toledo Light", a rotating beacon used to guide aircraft; the light had been in existence since the 1920s as part of a nationwide lighthouse system.

The Toledo-Winlock Airport was a possible site for a maintenance hub for Northwest Airlines and to be of potential use for the Portland Interceptive Command, a joint Army-Navy Reserve flight operation based out of Portland, Oregon. Neither attempt was successful. Another consideration of the airport failed in 1964, when Boeing considered the airstrip as a landing gear test site for its 707 aircraft; the runway was considered unsuitable. In mid-1975, airspace over the airport was used to test noise levels of a new DC-9 Series 50 jetliner; the McDonnell Douglas aircraft, due to weight and the length of the airstrip, did not use the landing strip.

The FAA, which had oversight of the airport since 1958, made several attempts to close the airfield's flight information station. The first effort began in 1964 and was suspected to be due to funding concerns. The station survived and became known as the Toledo Flight Service Station but concerns over maintenance costs, and citing improved technology and reduced usage of the monitoring facility, led to another closure attempt in late 1972 and into 1973. During the closure attempts, the airport was to install a lighted homing beacon in 1974 but was delayed by the FAA. After lawsuits and postponements, the FAA decided in September 1976 to keep the flight information station open but with severely reduced hours and staffing. The reduction was postponed but made official by February 1977. Equipment for an En Route Flight Advisory Service system was installed during the delay.

The airport was the closest airfield during the 1980 eruption of Mount St. Helens and served as an important center for search-and-rescue operations in the aftermath. A temporary morgue was constructed at the airport during the early operations after the eruption.

=== 21st century ===
In December 2001, the communities of Toledo and Winlock officially transferred ownership of the airport to the county.

A group students from the Toledo Middle School's Students Against Destructive Decisions (SADD) helped to overhaul and improve the grounds and facilities during a late spring two-week effort in 2003. Later that year, the airport received a $1.2 million grant from the FAA for the repaving of the runway, maintaining its 150 foot (46 metres) width; the project was completed and dedicated by the end of the year. In 2005, the airfield was the site of an attempted record-breaking tandem parachute jump. Falling short of the mark of 128, it set a regional record of 117 instead.

A $3.2 million project to upgrade the airport was undertaken and completed in 2020. Primarily funded by the FAA, the runway was repainted and the taxiway was rebuilt to average 25 feet (7.6 m) in width and new lighting was installed.

Also during 2020, Lewis County proposed Ed Carlson Memorial Field as a potential site for a state initiative to build a new commercial airport in Western Washington and was officially considered the following year. A group of residents in the Toledo area formed a group to oppose the consideration on the merits of protecting the rural environment in the region with additional concerns regarding increases in crime, pollution, and traffic congestion. Despite the airport being one of six finalists, due to public objections, the airfield was removed from consideration and was not among the final options by August 2022.

=== Accidents and incidents ===
The airport was the last to be in contact with a Marine Corps Curtiss R5C Commando that crashed approximately 3.5 miles (5.6 km) away on the afternoon of December 10, 1946. The station at Toledo authorized clearance for the aircraft to climb to a higher elevation due to icy conditions; contact ceased quickly thereafter and 32 men were lost.

== Facilities and aircraft ==
The airport covers an area of 95 acres (38 ha) at an elevation of 374 feet (114 m) above mean sea level. It has one runway designated 6/24 with an asphalt surface measuring 4,479 by 150 feet (1,365 x 46 m).

When the county took sole-ownership of the field, agreements were offered for tenants to rent parcels on the grounds. Renters could then build hangars on their contracted plat, maintaining ownership of any structure during the lease. However, improvements were then forfeited to the airport once the original rental contract ended. A 2018 budget report listed eight hangars on the grounds and 15 tie-down sites.

Reports in 1969 recorded approximately 3,000 aircraft operations. In 2012, operations were estimated to include over 16,000 flights, for an average of 45 per day. For the 12-month period ending December 31, 2020, the airport had 8,300 aircraft operations, an average of 23 per day: 97% general aviation and 2% military.

In the 21st century, aircraft based at the airport were reported as 66 in 2003 and by 2016, included 36 single-engine, 6 multi-engine, the permission to host one jet and an allowable increase of helicopters on the ground from two to three. In 2020, 40 aircraft based at this airport: 38 single-engine, and 2 multi-engine.

The airport owns an undeveloped 15-acre (6.1 ha) parcel set aside for future expansion of the airfield and its facilities.

== Training and flight programs ==
South Lewis County Airport is home to the Toledo Flying Club, a membership organization that began in 1938, though officially in 1940, and offers flight instructions to participants. One of the founding members was a Toledo school teacher, Cecelia Earhart, a cousin of Amelia Earhart. The flying club is the oldest of its kind in the state and was host to a fly-in during the 1960s and 1970s that coincided with a local threshing bee festival.

The airfield, beginning in 1972, has been host to a skydiving school, first known as the Toledo Parachute Center.

== Economy ==
As of 2018, the South Lewis County Airport had a budget of over $3.2 million, with expenditures approximately the same. The airport supports one full-time position.

== See also ==
- List of airports in Washington
- Chehalis–Centralia Airport
- Packwood Airport
