= Winlock Egg =

Tourist attraction in Lewis County, Washington

- Winlock Egg, 2007
- Year: 1923
- Location: Winlock, Washington, United States; 46°29′36″N 122°56′16″W

The Winlock Egg is a tourist attraction in Winlock, Washington, United States. The current structure, known as the "World's Largest Egg", is the fourth Winlock Egg to be constructed.

== Background ==
Chicken farms and hatcheries became an economic staple in Winlock, Washington after its founding in the 1870s. By the early 1920s, eggs produced in Winlock were being shipped to New York City and noted to be in "great demand". Egg production increased by the end of 1923 after the implementation of scientific advances within the industry and the installation of a "modern-day", 40,000 capacity egg incubator. The town became a central location for egg production in the region, advantaged by the railroad lines through the community. In the 1920s, Winlock was considered the second-largest egg producing town in the United States. By the 1930s, or during peak years, the community was shipping approximately two million eggs and 2.5 million chicks annually across the country.

Winlock became known as the "Egg Capital of the World" (Note: The city of Petaluma, California also laid claim to being the egg capital of the world during the time.) and as "the egg nest of the West" but by the 1950s, egg farms in the town had waned. The Winlock-based Washington Cooperative Egg & Poultry Association, formed in 1920, was shuttered in 1963.

The city held its first Winlock Eggs Day festival in 1921; (Note: The first year of the Eggs Day festival is sometimes reported to have taken place in 1923, depending on the source. See sources throughout the article for the discrepancy.) the event became an annual festival by 1937 and features a parade, an "Egg Queen" is crowned, and attendees are offered free egg sandwiches. (Note: The Winlock Eggs Day festival was first known as "Poultry and Egg Day", and began as a celebration of a completed road between Winlock and Toledo.)

== History ==
=== First egg, 1923 ===
The first iteration, known as the "big white egg", was built in 1923 for a celebration of the opening of the Pacific Highway Bridge over the Columbia River between Washington and Oregon as well as to celebrate the expansion of trade between the states. The egg was made of plaster over canvas, which was stretched over a wood frame and painted white. For the event, it was mounted onto a Model T Ford as part of a parade of floats and vehicles that traveled from Olympia, Washington to Salem, Oregon on October 23, 1923. (Note: A sign on the truck hauling the first egg during the 1923 parade stated, "Winlock, home of the white leghorn".)

The idea for the egg came from John G. Lawrence, the manager of a newly formed egg and poultry co-op as a way to represent the growing industry centered in Winlock in the 1920s. Lawrence referred to Winlock as the "home of the big white egg" in reference to the large eggs produced in the region. During that time, farmers in Winlock were shipping as much as a quarter million cases of eggs to market a year.

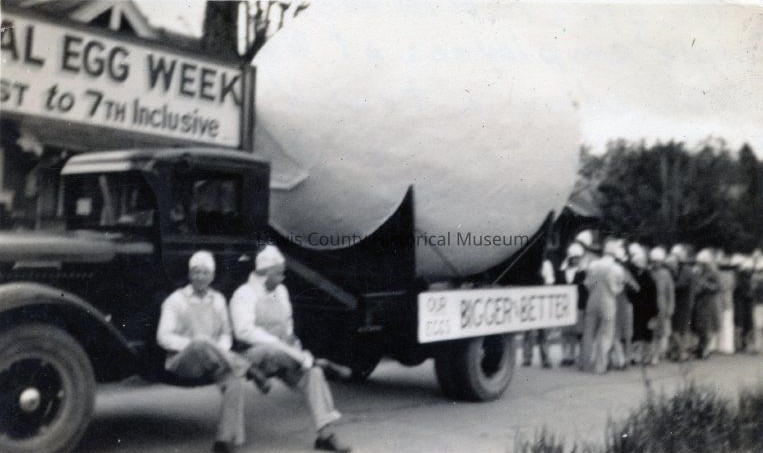
First Winlock Egg, during dedication of Highway 99, 1923

The first egg weighed 2,000 lb (910 kg). It was 12 feet (3.7 m) in length and had a maximum diameter of 8 feet (2.4 m). After the parade, the egg was placed on a wooden platform atop a lattice base near the train depot, and the continuance of the display has since remained a source of local pride. (Note: Sourcing mentions the first canvas egg was replaced by a tin model. Photographs of the tin egg exist but whether or not it was a different sculpture for a separate purpose has not been determined.)

=== Second egg, 1944 ===
After 20 years in the elements, the first egg had deteriorated and was replaced in 1944 with a plastic version made by a new company to the area, the Johnny Simpson's Plastic Company.

The 1944 version lasted until June 29, 1958, when it fell from its rotted platform and cracked. (Note: The loss of the 1944 egg was also claimed to have been the act of vandalism by "rotten kids" who may have tied a rope to the egg and pulled it down.)

=== Third egg, 1965 ===
No replacement egg was immediately created until a fundraising effort to do so was led by the town's Lions Club in 1963. A new fiberglass sculpture was created and was installed in May 1965. The third egg was located at the corner of Fir and Kerron streets, less than a block north of where the previous egg had been displayed. Weighing in at 1,500 pounds (680 kg), the egg was 15 feet (4.6 m) in length and 7 feet (2.1 m) tall, and was placed on top of a 15 foot (4.6 m) steel column; written at the base directly underneath the egg was the phrase, "Winlock - Home of the World's Largest Egg". The egg was officially dedicated during the 29th Egg Day festival on July 19, 1965. There were concerns that the third egg was shaped too much like a football.

=== Fourth egg, 1991 ===
Another fiberglass replacement egg, donated by Vern Zander, was installed in 1991. Created by Beverly Roberts beginning in 1990, the egg was constructed of four-ply fiberglass and required 7 US gallons (26 L; 5.8 imp gal) of white paint, eight cans of plastic body filler, and ten vats of plaster. The community created a fenced park, Vern Zander Memorial Park, around the attraction and the egg was once again labeled with a sign denoting it as the world's largest egg.

The new 1,200 lb (540 kg) sculpture was part of the Winlock Egg Day Parade before it was placed in the park on top of a 10 foot (3.0 m)-tall steel support. The sculpture was temporarily removed from its perch for repairs and refurbishment in 2016.

As part of the dedication, the Winlock Lions Club added a time capsule at the base of the sculpture. The 2 foot (0.61 m)-long, sealed black PVC pipe was intended to be opened in 2041. In December 2017, volunteer's who were decorating the town during the Christmas season noticed the protruding pipe, and believing it to be a bomb, contacted the police. Several law enforcement agencies were alerted and the capsule was cut in half during the attempt to disarm the potential explosive. A local museum owner took ownership of the remaining items in the historic cache, which included a written history of the Winlock Egg and assorted historical newspaper articles.

== Geography ==
The 1991 Winlock Egg is located in Winlock, Washington. The sculpture is placed at Vern Zander Memorial Park, situated at the intersection of Old Highway 603 and Fir Street, and off Kerron Avenue near the train tracks.

== World's Largest Egg title ==
The feature has been given the moniker, the "World's Largest Egg" and was featured as such on an episode of Ripley's Believe It or Not!. (Note: Although sourcing mentions that the Winlock Egg was covered during an episode of the Ripley's Believe It or Not! television series in 1989, the show is noted to have ended in 1986. Whether the year is listed incorrectly, or perhaps relates to a rerun, is not known per sources.)

Competition for the actual title includes the Vegreville egg (Note: The Vegreville egg is listed to be more than twice the length, and over four times the weight, of the Winlock egg.) and an egg sculpture in Mentone, Indiana, noted to be taller by approximately 10 feet (3.0 m). The title of the world's largest egg has also been claimed for a display in Newberry, South Carolina and a 15 foot (4.6 m)-wide, 22 foot (6.7 m)-tall sculpture in Wilson, Kansas. Weighing 8,000 pounds (3,600 kg), the work is known as "the World’s Largest Hand-Made Czech Egg".

== Decorations ==
The Winlock Egg is usually painted eggshell white. The third egg was painted gold in celebration of Winlock's 50th Egg Day festival in 1986; per reports, the new color did not distance the sculpture from its football-shaped appearance.

In the 21st century, the egg has been painted to reflect certain interests or events, such as an American flag after the September 11 attacks and the Seattle Seahawks logo in the 2010s. In celebration of the United States Semiquincentennial, the feature was painted to reflect the anniversary.
