= Vegreville egg =

Statue in Vegreville, Alberta, Canada

Coordinates: 53.4917°N 112.0365°W

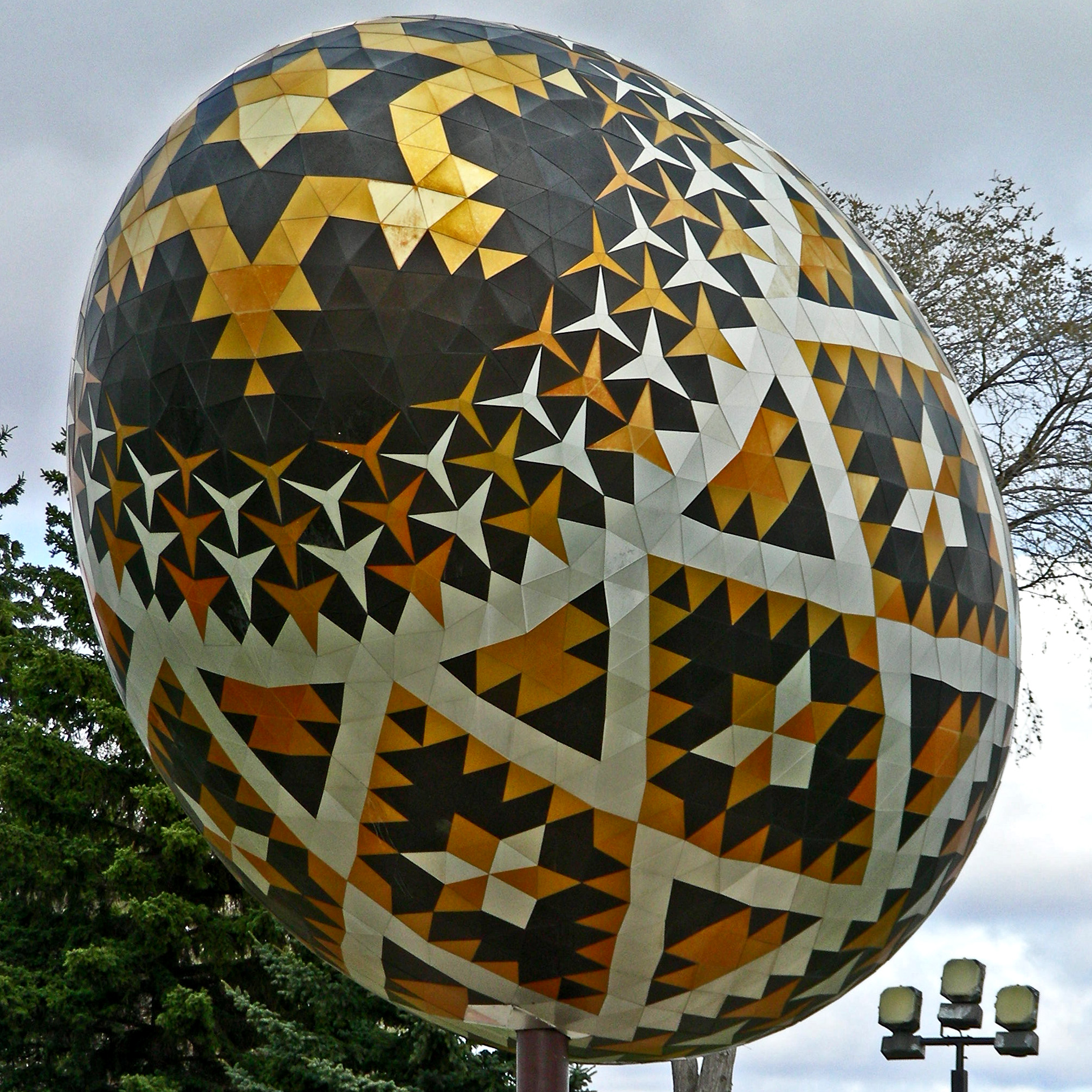
Vegreville egg

The Vegreville egg is a giant sculpture of a pysanka, a Ukrainian-style Easter egg. The work by Paul Maxym Sembaliuk is built of an intricate set of two-dimensional anodized aluminum tiles in the shape of congruent equilateral triangles and star-shaped hexagons, fashioned over an aluminum framework. The egg is 31 ft (9 m) long and three and a half storeys high, weighing in at 2.5 t (5,512 lb). It is the second largest pysanka in the world (the biggest one was built into part of the Pysanka Museum in Kolomyia, Ukraine, in 2000).

The sculpture was commissioned by the town of Vegreville in the Canadian province of Alberta, noted for its high Ukrainian Canadian population. In order to obtain funding for it, the town applied for a federal government grant and was eventually able to obtain some funding, but only if the sculpture was dedicated to the 1975 centennial of the Royal Canadian Mounted Police. Vegreville received a grant to construct the egg, a nod at Ukrainian culture in Canada, and specifically at early Ukrainian settlements east of Edmonton, Alberta.

The egg is one of the main tourist attractions along the Yellowhead Highway, and thousands of tourists visit it yearly. It is located at the north side of Alberta Highway 16A in Elk's Park.

== Design ==
The sculpture was designed by Paul Maxym Sembaliuk (1929–2019), a Canadian artist of Ukrainian descent who was born and raised in the Willingdon and Vegreville area. It was realized with the help of computer scientist Ronald Resch.

In the Pysanka's early conception, many types of materials were considered, from concrete to wood. The small sum of money granted to Vegreville was not nearly enough to fund the building of the egg and Paul used many of his political and community contacts to muster up support for the project. Paul was at the time a graphic artist working for the Alberta government. A few years earlier, Paul had managed the design and production of a 25 million dollar province wide anodized aluminum signage project; the contract having been awarded to Permaloy coatings division in Alberta. A few years later, Paul asked Permaloy if they would, as a favour to the Ukrainian immigrants of Canada, donate money and the anodized aluminum for the Pysanka's construction. Permaloy readily agreed. Paul wanted to use anodized aluminum because of its durability and the fact that the colours would never fade under the rays of the sun.

The next problem was to find a technical solution for the use of the aluminum in the Pysanka's construction. Paul's first cousin, Dr. John Ruptash had also grown up in the Vegreville Area. Dr. Ruptash was at the time dean of engineering at Carleton University in Ottawa. He was an aeronautical engineer. Dr. Ruptash suggested to Paul that a computer be used to execute the technical drawings of the Pysanka. He made some phone calls and recommended to Paul an old friend of his, Dr. Ron Resch and his team of mathematicians at the University of Utah.

Though the surface area of an egg can be difficult to solve mathematically, the enigma of how to assemble two-dimensional tiles onto a three-dimensional egg was eventually solved by Ronald Resch, a computer science professor from the University of Utah, and his team that included Robert McDermott, who wrote an algorithm to cast a periodic B-spline curve that was used to define and manufacture the egg. It was the first physical structure designed entirely with computer-aided geometric modeling software.

Resch and his team tiled the egg using a total of 1108 congruent equilateral triangles, 524 concave hexagons (3-pointed stars), 3,512 visible facets, 6,978 nuts and bolts and 177 internal struts. The tiles range in thickness from 1/16 in (1.588 mm) to 1/8 in (3.175 mm) and are jointed at angles ranging from 1° at the center to 7° at the tips. These are held together by an internal framework of radiating spokes, which connect the egg's "shell." The pysanka leans at a 30° relative to the base, and turns with the wind similar to the motions of a weather vane.

The software created to guide the lasers which cut the Pysanka's tiles was eventually purchased and used for the cutting of the exterior tiles of the Space Shuttle.

== Gallery ==
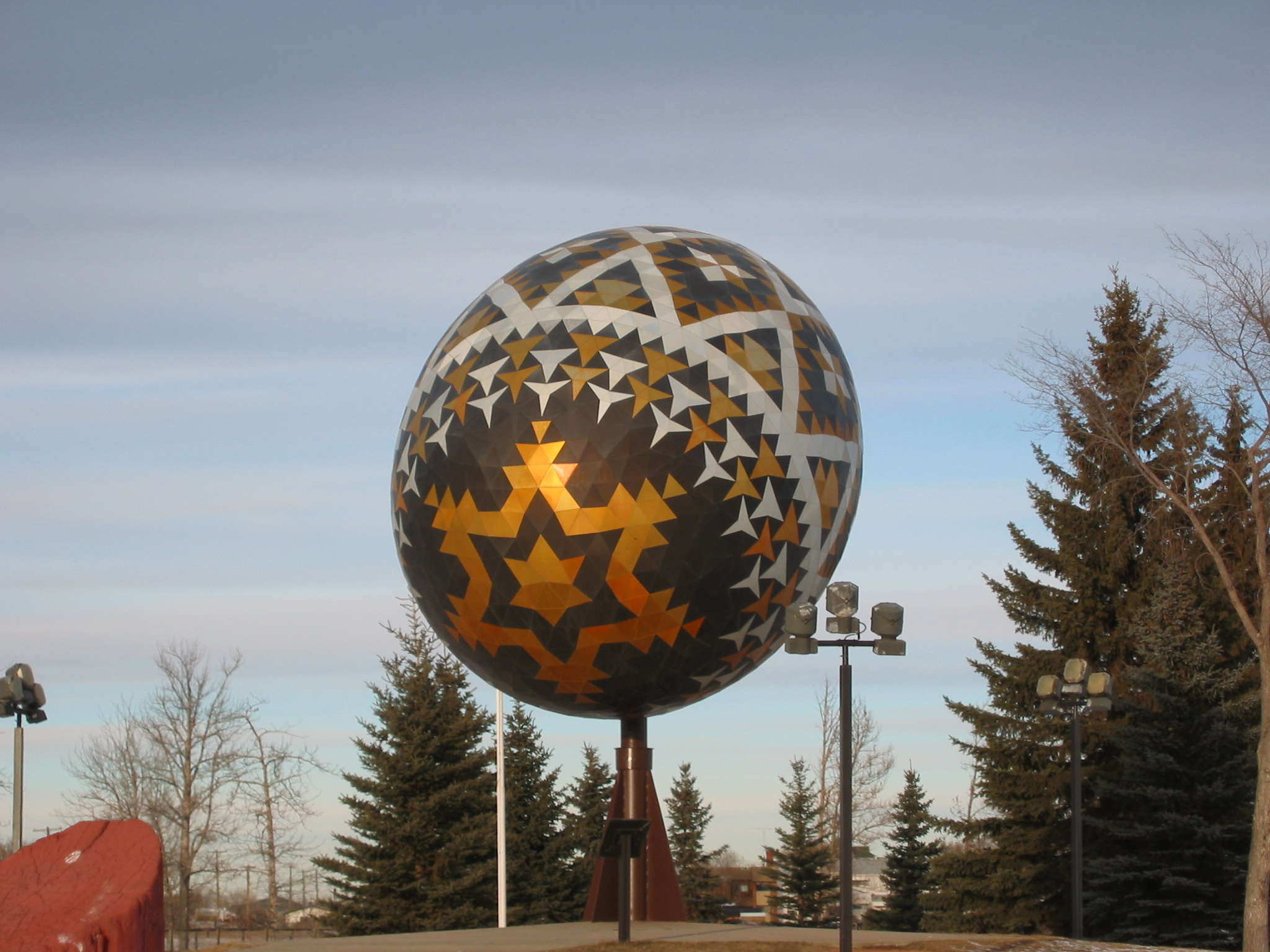
The July Pysanka Festival showcases Ukrainian culture in Alberta

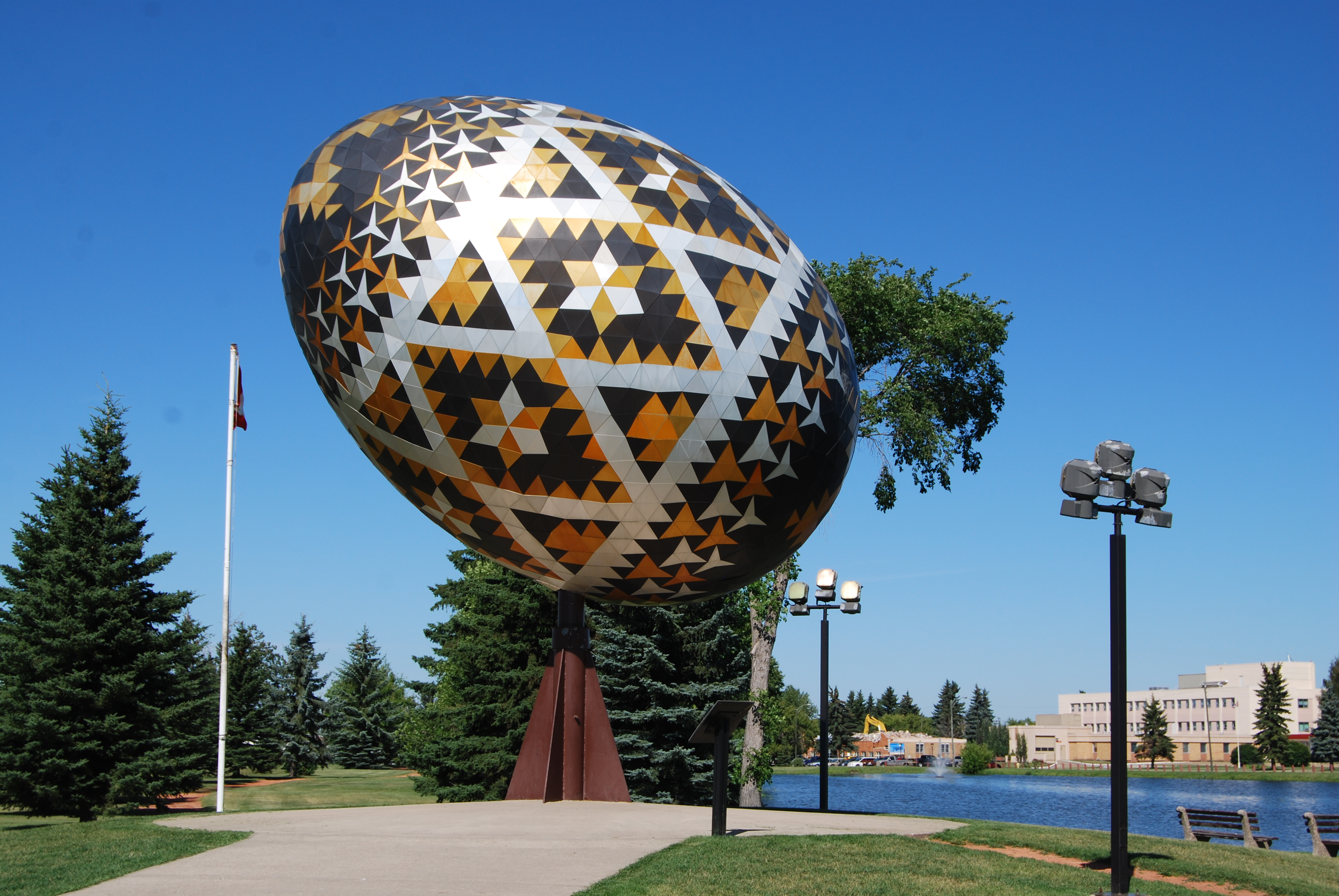
Different view of the detailed Egg

== See also ==
- Winlock Egg
