= Mentone, Indiana =

- Town
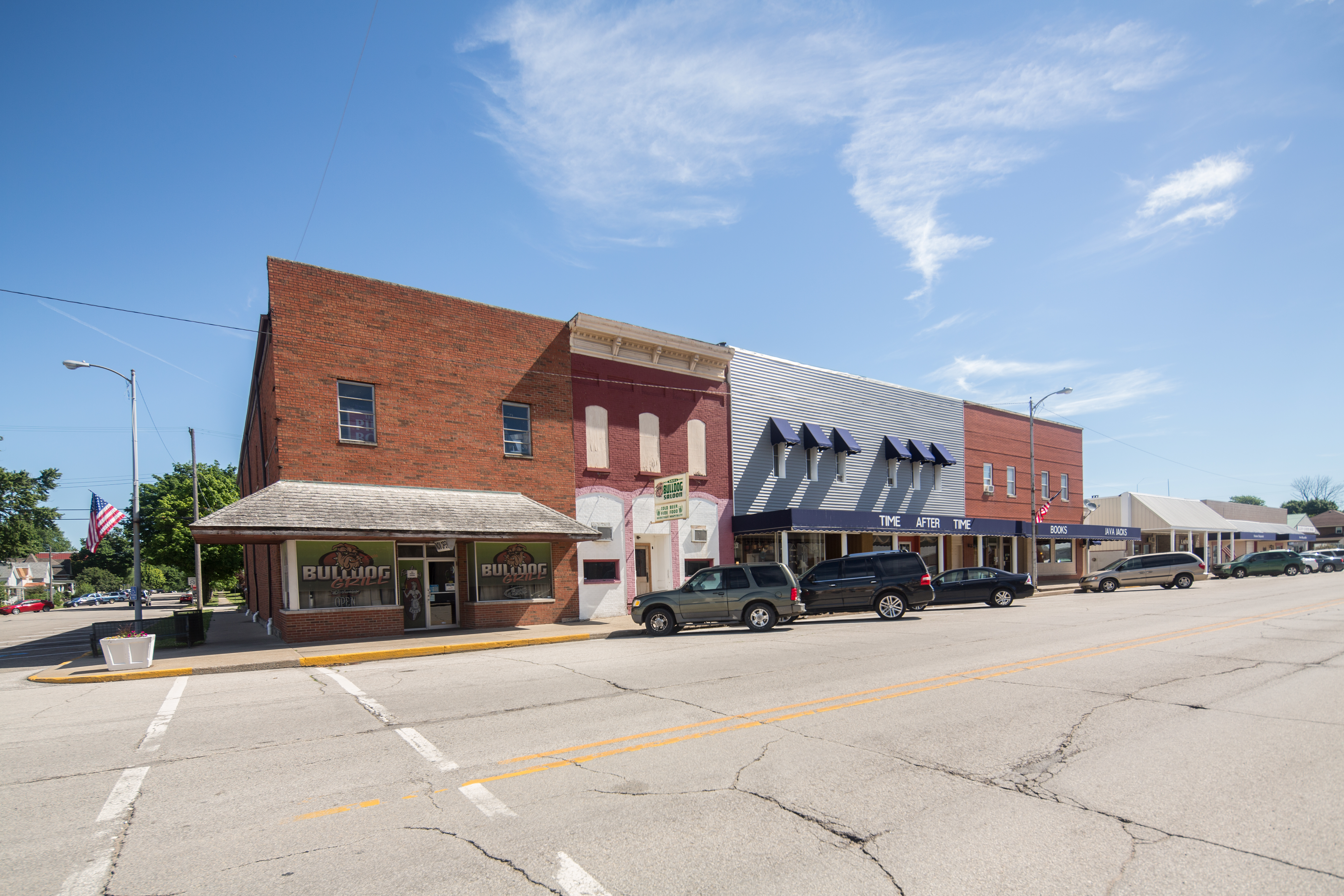

- Location of Mentone in Kosciusko County, Indiana.
- Coordinates: 41°10′27″N 86°02′18″W
- Country: United States
- State: Indiana
- County: Kosciusko
- Township: Harrison, Franklin

Area
  - Total: 0.59 sq mi (1.54 km^{2})
  - Land: 0.58 sq mi (1.51 km^{2})
  - Water: 0.012 sq mi (0.03 km^{2})
- Elevation: 833 ft (254 m)

Population (2020)
  - Total: 943
  - Density: 1,617.6/sq mi (624.55/km^{2})
- Time zone: UTC-5 (Eastern (EST))
  - Summer (DST): UTC-4 (EDT)
- ZIP code: 46539
- Area code: 574
- FIPS code: 18-48402
- GNIS feature ID: 2396750
- Website: mentonein.gov

Mentone is a town in Harrison and Franklin townships, Kosciusko County, in the U.S. state of Indiana. Mentone is the self-proclaimed "Egg Basket of the Midwest" because of prolific commercial egg production in the area, and holds an Egg Festival annually in early June to celebrate its heritage. A large concrete egg stands near the town center and is considered locally to be the "Largest Egg in the World". The Lawrence D. Bell Aircraft Museum, is located within the town limits. The Popular Rotorcraft Association has its home at the PRA Mentone Airport C92) and is home to their annual fly-in convention.

As of the 2020 census, Mentone had a population of 943.

== History ==
Mentone was platted in 1882. It was likely named after Menton, in France. The Mentone post office was established in 1882.

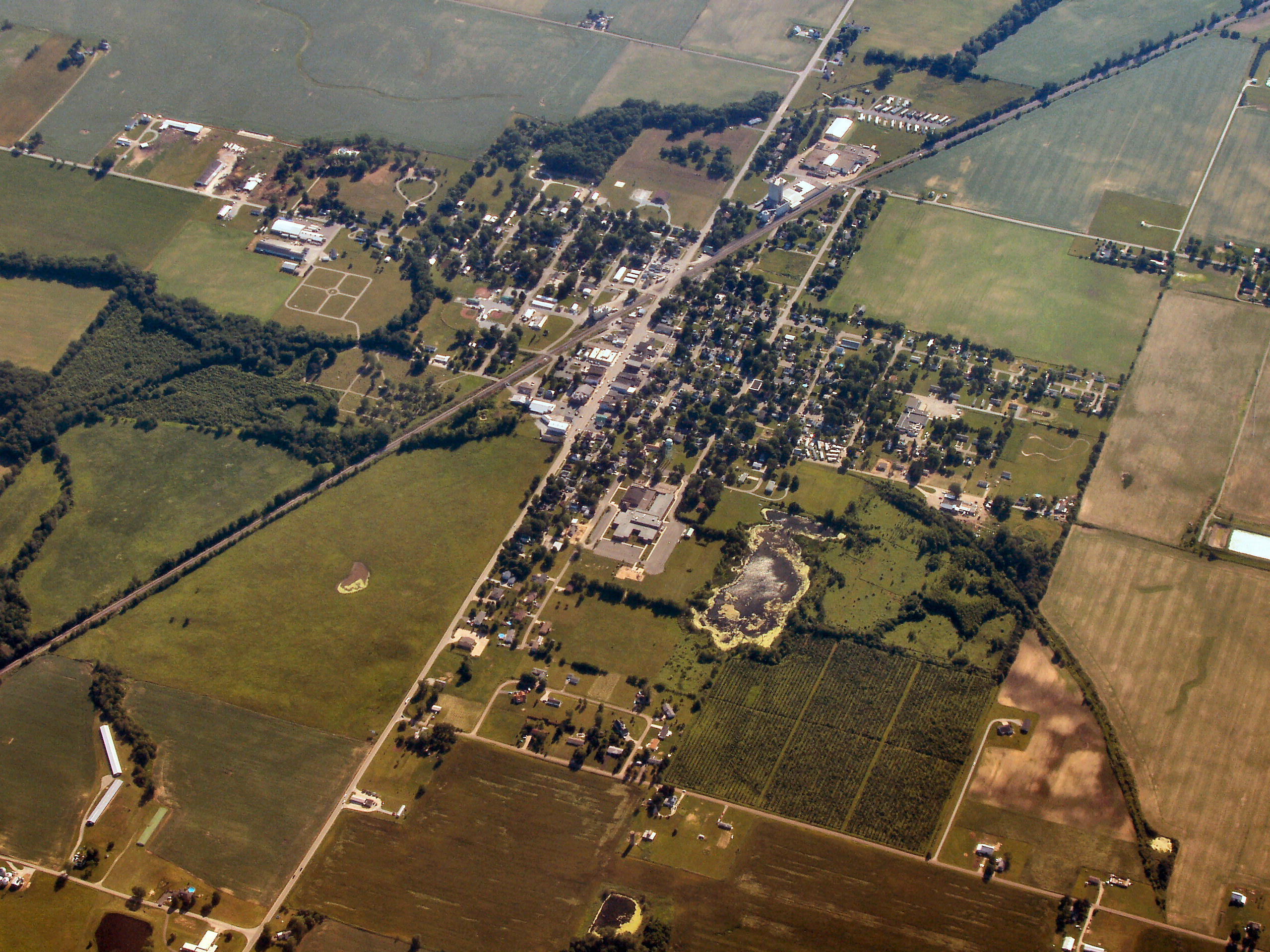
Mentone from the air, looking southwest

== Geography ==
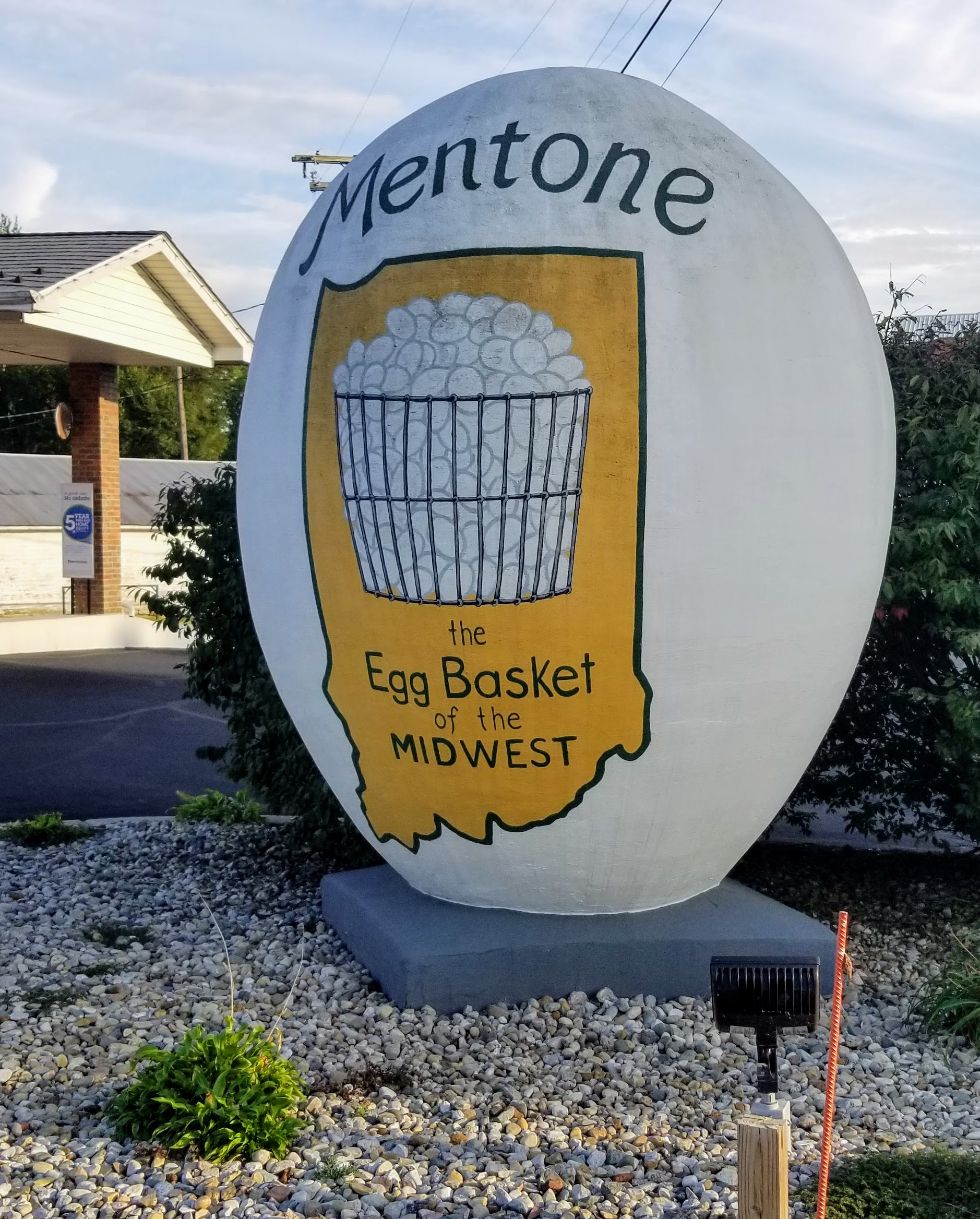
A 10-foot-tall concrete egg celebrating Mentone's egg production.

According to the 2010 census, Mentone has a total area of 0.59 square miles (1.53 km^{2}), of which 0.58 square miles (1.50 km^{2}) (or 98.31%) is land and 0.01 square miles (0.03 km^{2}) (or 1.69%) is water.

== Demographics ==
Historical population
Census	Pop.	Note	%±
1890	780		—
1900	757		−2.9%
1910	728		−3.8%
1920	678		−6.9%
1930	704		3.8%
1940	731		3.8%
1950	798		9.2%
1960	813		1.9%
1970	830		2.1%
1980	973		17.2%
1990	912		−6.3%
2000	898		−1.5%
2010	1,001		11.5%
2020	943		−5.8%
U.S. Decennial Census

=== 2010 census ===
As of the census of 2010, there were 1,001 people, 369 households, and 267 families living in the town. The population density was 1,725.9 inhabitants per square mile (666.4/km^{2}). There were 423 housing units at an average density of 729.3 per square mile (281.6/km^{2}). The racial makeup of the town was 94.1% White, 0.3% African American, 0.8% Native American, 3.1% from other races, and 1.7% from two or more races. Hispanic or Latino of any race were 4.8% of the population.

There were 369 households, of which 38.8% had children under the age of 18 living with them, 53.1% were married couples living together, 14.4% had a female householder with no husband present, 4.9% had a male householder with no wife present, and 27.6% were non-families. 22.8% of all households were made up of individuals, and 12.2% had someone living alone who was 65 years of age or older. The average household size was 2.71 and the average family size was 3.13.

The median age in the town was 31.2 years. 28.8% of residents were under the age of 18; 10.9% were between the ages of 18 and 24; 26.6% were from 25 to 44; 22.6% were from 45 to 64; and 11.2% were 65 years of age or older. The gender makeup of the town was 49.7% male and 50.3% female.

=== 2000 census ===
As of the census of 2000, there were 898 people, 335 households, and 230 families living in the town. The population density was 1,424.6 inhabitants per square mile (550.0/km^{2}). There were 365 housing units at an average density of 579.0 per square mile (223.6/km^{2}). The racial makeup of the town was 94.99% White, 0.11% African American, 0.22% Native American, 3.79% from other races, and 0.89% from two or more races. Hispanic or Latino of any race were 5.90% of the population.

There were 335 households, out of which 38.8% had children under the age of 18 living with them, 55.8% were married couples living together, 9.3% had a female householder with no husband present, and 31.3% were non-families. 27.5% of all households were made up of individuals, and 14.9% had someone living alone who was 65 years of age or older. The average household size was 2.68 and the average family size was 3.25.

In the town, the population was spread out, with 31.2% under the age of 18, 9.4% from 18 to 24, 26.5% from 25 to 44, 17.5% from 45 to 64, and 15.5% who were 65 years of age or older. The median age was 32 years. For every 100 females, there were 93.5 males. For every 100 females age 18 and over, there were 89.0 males.

The median income for a household in the town was $38,750, and the median income for a family was $42,222. Males had a median income of $27,250 versus $22,917 for females. The per capita income for the town was $15,372. About 5.7% of families and 6.3% of the population were below the poverty line, including 8.2% of those under age 18 and 1.8% of those age 65 or over.

== Education ==
The town has a lending library, the Bell Memorial Public Library.

== Notable people ==
- Lawrence D. Bell, the founder of Bell Aircraft, was born in Mentone.

== See also ==
- Winlock Egg
