= Port of Centralia =

Port authority in Centralia, Washington

Port authority overview
- Formed: September 16, 1986
- Jurisdiction: Lewis County, Washington
- Headquarters: Centralia, Washington, U.S. 46°44′07″N 123°00′01″W
- Annual budget: $15 million (2026 approx.)
- Port authority executive: Amy Graber, Executive Director
- Website: portofcentralia.com

The Port of Centralia is a local government agency, tax district, and port authority that oversees two industrial parks, including an industrial park of the same name, and a mixed-use development campus in the city of Centralia, Washington.

The port was created by public vote, officially beginning on September 16, 1986. Along with the Port of Chehalis, it is one of the last ports to have been established in Washington state.

Two industrial campuses, known as Park I and Park II, were first begun in 1988 and 2003, respectively. Operating revenue of the port surpassed $1.0 million for the first time in 2024. As of 2025, the port's activity is estimated to generate $1 billion in connected economic revenues, and businesses at the three industrial sites employ over 3,000 people.

== History ==
Due to a loss of logging and railroad opportunities which had long been an economic focal point of Centralia, a period of a declining economy began in the city by the 1980s, which also affected other communities in Lewis County. In order to combat the waning financial outlook in the city, Centralia started efforts to create a port district which was meant to increase and diversify the city's commercial and employment sectors. Non-countywide port districts were not legally allowed to be established in the state since the 1970s. The law was overruled after an adopted resolution by the city council of Winlock was accepted and passed in the state legislature, officially becoming law on June 11, 1986. Immediately afterwards, a signature-supported referendum was added to Centralia's election ballot.

The Port of Centralia and it's tax district was officially established by public vote on September 16, 1986; (Note: Vote tallies for the 1986 port measure recorded 2,133 in favor and 1,661 opposed.) along with the Port of Chehalis, it was one of the last ports created in the state. (Note: A third port, to be located in the Toledo and Winlock area, was proposed in 1986 along with the Centralia and Chehalis ports but failed to materialize after a public vote defeated the measure.) The first commissioners were Gene Groshong, Art Lehman, and Bob Thompson.

The district began collecting taxes in 1988, purchasing property on Galvin Road the same year and into the next. The Washington Public Ports Association awarded the Port of Centralia with the "Port of the Year Award" in 1994.

== Port management and oversight ==
The authority oversees three sites, including the Centralia Industrial Park. The port is part of the South Puget Sound Foreign Trade Zone, created in 1996.

== Properties ==
The port's first industrial park site, known as Park I, is located on Galvin Road and was created by the authority beginning with the first purchases of land in 1988. The site's first business tenant was Rogers Machinery in 1990. As of 2025, Park I has 24 total businesses on the grounds, including a brewery company, a healthcare organization, and United Natural Foods.

In 2003, the port began the construction of a second industrial campus known as Park II. By 2016, the port's ownership also contained a mixed-use development property culminating in the authority's total landholdings to exceed 1,500 acres (610 ha).

== Economics ==
In 2024, the port exceeded $1.0 million in operating revenue for the first time. The authority carried debt of over $757,000 of which the "full faith and credit" of the port covered almost $500,000 of the financial liability. Non-operating revenues decreased from $3.3 million in 2023 to $2.2 million in 2024. (Note: The original non-operating revenue that was budgeted for 2023 was $9.1 million. Delayed sales of port property were reported as the leading cause of the lack of expected revenue that year.) Property tax refunds between the two fiscal years led to the decrease in expected revenue. The port's net position was listed at under $41 million with total assets reported to be $45.3 million.

The 2026 budget includes operating revenues of $1.02 million and non-operating revenues of $14.9 million. Expenses, operating and non-operating, are listed at $1.17 million and $3.12 million, respectively. Almost $582,000 is earmarked for port commissioner and staff salaries.

The port estimated that, as of 2025, the industrial parks generate approximately $691 million in direct fiscal activity, and over $1 billion in combined economic output. Local and state taxes produced through port and industrial park activity were estimated for 2026 to be over $27 million.

== Employment ==
As of 2025, the Port of Centralia's three industrial campuses employ approximately 3,145 workers with wages and benefits estimated at $239 million. Additional employment attributed to the port, such as induced or indirect workers, is assessed at almost 1,800 employees.
