= Packwood Airport =

Airport in Washington, United States

- IATA: none; ICAO: none; FAA LID: 55S

Summary
- Airport type: General Aviation
- Owner: Lewis County
- Serves: Packwood, Washington
- Elevation AMSL: 1,057 ft / 322 m
- Coordinates: 46°36.25′N 121°40.67′W
- Interactive map of Packwood Airport

Runways
Direction	Length		Surface
Direction	ft	m	Surface
01/19	2,356	718	Asphalt

Statistics (2010)
- Aircraft operations: 5,300
- Based aircraft: 4
- Source: WSDOT

Packwood Airport is a single runway, public general aviation airport, 3 blocks west of U.S. Route 12 in downtown Packwood, Washington. No commercial service uses the airport, and flight operations are predominantly private, with search-and-rescue and wildfire control operations in the Gifford Pinchot National Forest and Mount Rainier National Park a significant secondary usage. It is one of two airports, including South Lewis County Airport, owned and operated by Lewis County, Washington.

== History ==
The airport, originally known as Anderson Field, was constructed for use as an emergency airstrip in 1950 by the Washington State Aeronautics Division (WSAD). (Note: Sourcing varies on the beginning of construction, often cited as 1948 or a vague 1940s timeline.) The land was deeded to the state in 1946 by the Anderson family and a grass runway was built in a cleared forest area; the airport was dedicated in 1952. Remaining unchanged for two decades, in 1971 the runway was lengthened from 2,000 feet (609.6 m) to 2,360 feet (719.3 m) and the width was also increased from 30 feet (9.1 m) to 50 feet (15.2 m). The gravel airstrip, which was installed in 1968 to replace the grass runway, was reconstructed using a mat of crushed rock and oil. The runway was eventually paved for the first time in 1985.

By the 1970s, Packwood Airport was still under the oversight of the WSAD and was used primarily as a base for combating forest fires and as an evacuation route for seriously injured Packwood residents. The airfield was often vandalized and there were numerous reports of shots fired at airborne planes. Lewis County became owner of the airport in 1982 after a transfer of ownership from the Washington State Department of Transportation (WSDOT). The airport was planned to be closed by the state due to lack of operational funds but a local aviation group led a petition to deed the airfield to the county.

Until the installation of fencing on the grounds in the mid-1990s, the airport was known for occasional difficulties in takeoffs and landings due to herds of elk and deer that migrated through the fields. In 2001, the runway suffered several small cracks after an earthquake in February of that year. Not repaired until 2003 resulting from a lack of funds, no accidents from the damaged airstrip were recorded. The runway light system was also replaced. The lights had been inoperable for six months during that year having been damaged during a lawn mowing accident.

Due to the presence of nearby trees and hillsides to the north of the airport, plans were introduced in 2013 to remove 146 ft (45 m) of the northern portion of the runway and add at least a corresponding length to the south end of the strip. After an accident caused by a pothole on the runway, the airport was closed in October 2015 and a construction effort began in 2016 to widen the strip up to the FAA standard of 60 feet (18.3 m) along with a 250 feet (76.2 m) safety zone at the ends of the runway. Completed in July 2017, the $2.0 million project, which also included new lighting and stormwater drainage, received an award for "excellence in airport pavement" from the Washington Asphalt Pavement Association. The airfield was reopened and rededicated.

The grounds were used as a staging area for helicopters during the 2022 Goat Rocks Fire in the Goat Rocks Wilderness.

=== Accidents and incidents ===
A plane crash occurred in 1975 where a Beechcraft was unable to achieve lift and went through several layers of fencing past the runway. Although the plane caught fire, all five aboard escaped with only a few minor injuries. The incident was the first noted crash and fire in the history of the airport.

The airport was closed beginning in October 2015 after a landing attempt led to a crash after a plane hit a sinkhole. Sinkholes on or near the runway, caused by rotted tree stumps from the original clearing for the airstrip in 1950, were becoming a common concern. The airport reopened after the runway repair was completed in July 2017.

== Facilities and aircraft ==
Packwood Airport encompasses 36 acres (15 ha) and contains a hangar with a two-plane occupancy.

In 1953, the airport was home to two tie-down planes and the fields had not yet contained a hangar. In 1995, Packwood Airport based 7 aircraft. A 2010 report listed 4 aircraft.

Reported aircraft operations were listed as 10 per day in 2002, an annual amount of 8,497 in 2010, and an estimated 1,500 visitations in 2022.

== Training and flight programs ==
An early flight training and tourism program, known as Packwood Flight, existed in the 1950s. Packwood Airport has hosted the Packwood Mountain Fly-In since 2016. The annual program, a one-day event usually held in late July, is an aerial tour and local meet-and-greet of small aircraft and pilots in the region.

== Economy ==
Revenues for the airport in 1995 and 2010 reported similar earnings of around $198,000. A 2017 budget report listed revenues of $173,000.

== See also ==
- List of airports in Washington
- Chehalis–Centralia Airport
- South Lewis County Airport
