= Bremerton Motorsports Park =

Motorsports facility in Washington state

Coordinates: 47°29′20″N 122°45′17″W

Bremerton Motorsports Park is a multi-purpose motorsports facility located outside Bremerton and Port Orchard in the state of Washington, USA.

Bremerton Motorsports Park is located at the site of an inactive airfield adjacent to Bremerton National Airport. It has no permanent facilities, but often hosts drag races, autocrosses, car control clinics, local police training, drifting and driving events on a temporary, 1.1-mile-long road course, hosted by organizations including the SCCA. It is also known as Bremerton Raceways.
