= Chehalis–Centralia Airport =

Coordinates: 46°40′37.3″N 122°58′57.9″W

Chehalis-Centralia Airport
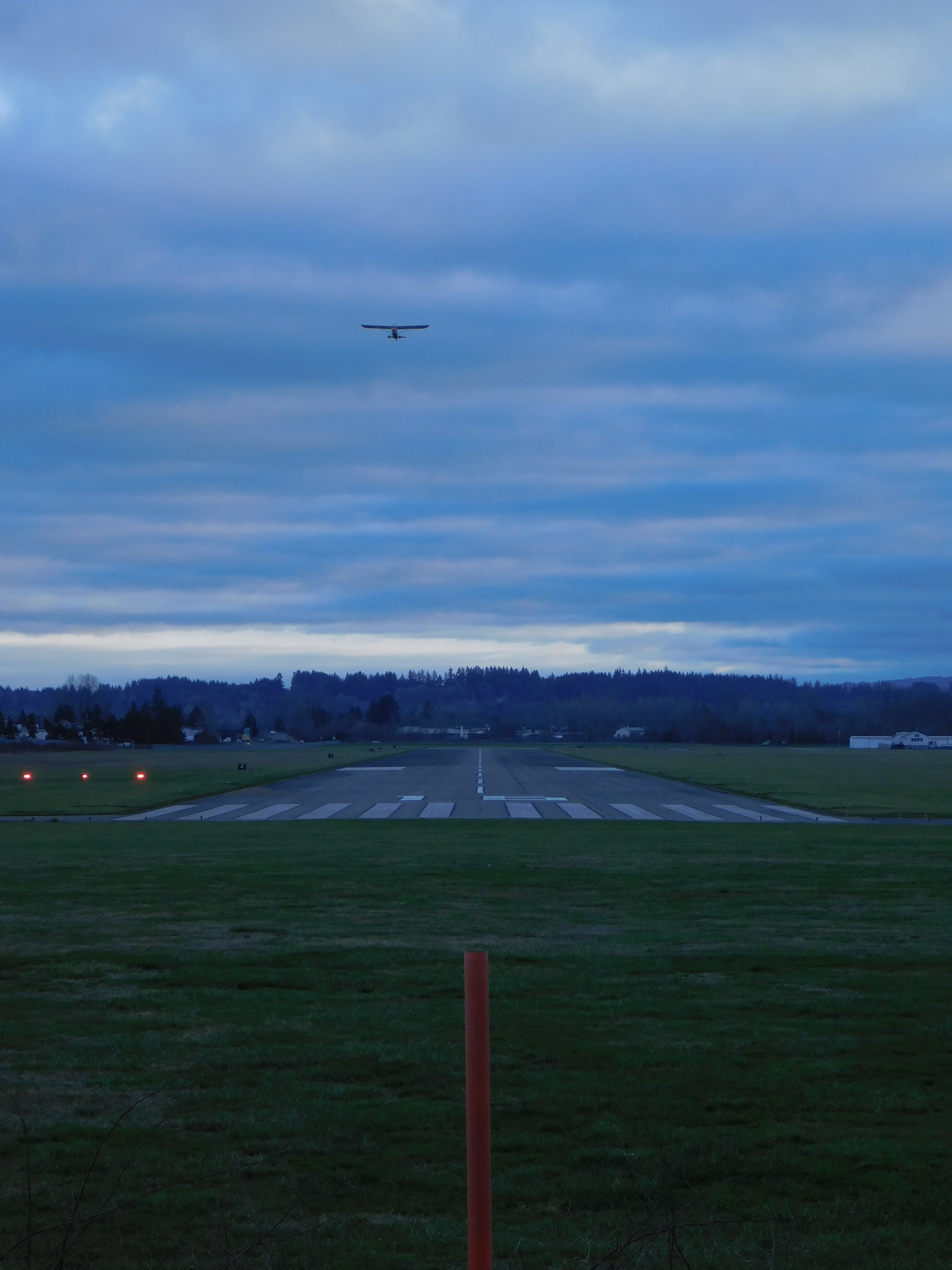
- IATA: CLS; ICAO: KCLS; FAA LID: CLS

Summary
- Airport type: Public
- Owner: City of Chehalis, Washington
- Serves: Chehalis and Centralia, Washington
- Location: Chehalis, Washington
- Elevation AMSL: 177 ft / 54 m
- Website: Chehalis-Centralis Airport
- Interactive map of Chehalis-Centralia Airport

Runways
Direction	Length		Surface
Direction	ft	m	Surface
16/34	5,000	1,524	Asphalt

Statistics (2023)
- Aircraft operations: 50,000
- Based aircraft: 56

Chehalis–Centralia Airport (IATA: CLS, ICAO: KCLS, FAA LID: CLS) is a city-owned public use airport located in Chehalis, a city in Lewis County, Washington. The airport lies one mile (1.6 km) west of the town.

Originally begun on farmland in 1927, the airfield was known as Donahoe Field and it hosted a small golf course. The airfield was seized for military use during World War II and became known as the County-City Airport, with transfer of ownership and management between Centralia, Chehalis, and Lewis County in the early 1960s. Chehalis became sole-owner of the airport in 2013.

Once a hub for West Coast Airlines from the mid 1940s into the late 1950s, the airport does not host a commercial air service. As of 2023, the airfield experiences approximately 50,000 flight operations per year.

The airport is situated in a floodplains and has experienced several inundations of floodwaters over the course of its history. Surrounded by a large levee first constructed during the second world war, various upgrades and expansions of flood control measures have been implemented in the 21st century.

== History ==
=== 20th century ===
The area was first served by an airport during the early 1900s on the Borst family homestead located near the Skookumchuck River and present-day Fort Borst Park in Centralia. The city of Centralia began an official airfield near the park in 1926. Known as the Centralia Municipal Air Field, the site was dedicated in August 1928 but the airport endeavor ceased by the mid-1930s due to a combination of the Great Depression and competition with the Chehalis airport.

Chehalis–Centralia Airport began in 1927, when the Donahoe family, which also owned an adjoining golf course, sold the city of Chehalis and Lewis County approximately 44 acres (18 ha) of their 600 acres (240 ha) farm for over $13,000. The parcel, known as Paul Donahoe Field, was originally a dirt runway and was dedicated as an airstrip on May 21, 1927 during a ceremony attended by an estimated crowd of 4,000 people, with flying performances by a dozen aircraft, including military airships. The nine-hole golf course was also part of the dedication. In 1928, the first hangar was built. Existing in the present day, it measured 5,000 square feet (460 m^{2}) at its beginning. During the same year, the county purchased an additional 50 acres (20 ha) to expand the airfield.

The grounds contained three airstrips and buildings in Chehalis were marked with directional arrows. The airstrips, in a north-to-south alignment, measured 2,000 feet (610 m) and by 1931 were considered to be grass and sod. The airport contained modern amenities of the time, including a fuel supply, telephone, and a weather reporting station.

The city of Chehalis was one of 11 locations, which included Portland and Seattle, to receive a 7,500,000 candlepower beacon during a 1926 initiative to improve night flying for air mail on the Pacific Coast. The airport was approved to be lighted for night flying beginning in August 1929. The $6,000 project was authorized and funded by the United States Department of Commerce's airway division. By September, the airfield, described as a municipal airport, was leased to the federal government and the installation of the lighting began. The grounds were also prepared for use as an emergency airstrip. Management of the airport was undertaken by the St. John Air Service from the late 1920s into the mid-1930s. During this time, the Queen of the Cowlitz, a sister airship to Charles Lindbergh's, Spirit of St. Louis, was based at Donahoe Field.

In 1941, the airfield, still listed as hosting three airstrips, was increased in size after an additional 81 acres (33 ha) were purchased. By the start of World War II, the airport covered 295 acres (119 ha), and became known as the County-City Airport. During the war, the federal government seized the airport, using it as a training facility for new pilots and a practice strip for Boeing bombers, and also developed two 5,000 feet (1,500 m) runways. In 1959, Chehalis annexed the airport land and the following year, ownership of the airfield was officially transferred to the city and the site run cooperatively with the county. After several local government delays, by September 1961 an official airport partnership between Centralia, Chehalis, and Lewis County was formed. The second runway was decommissioned beginning with efforts in 1978 to convert the land into a commercial area for retail businesses.

=== 21st century ===
Centralia withdrew from the joint operating agreement in 2004 due to concerns over contract violations, liability, and cost-benefits. Lewis County, which had been a 50% co-owner of the airport with the city of Chehalis since 1961, also relinquished its rights to the airfield in late 2013 despite opposition from the Chehalis-Centralia Airport board. The county considered the joint-ownership to be cumbersome and unnecessary. Concerns included that county involvement was possibly hindering growth and funding or completion of flood mitigation projects. Additionally, the city of Chehalis had, for some time, almost complete oversight and interest of the airport. The transfer of full-ownership to Chehalis was official on January 1, 2014.

The airport was granted the right in September 2009 to remove a bald eagle's nest and a 13-acre (5.3 ha) grove of cottonwood and fir trees approximately 2,000 feet (609.6 m) north of the runway; the nest and forested area were considered a possible hindrance to flight operations. The nest removal, the first allowed in the state since bald eagles were delisted from the Endangered Species Act in 2007, was approved by various state and federal agencies. The "eviction" was completed in January 2010; continued hazard monitoring was required when ospreys moved into the area immediately afterwards.

In 2020, the airport was granted a loan through the Washington State Department of Transportation (WSDOT), with an estimated completion cost of $1.48 million, to construct two, 12,000 US gallons (45,000 L; 10,000 imp gal) above-ground fuel storage tanks, with additional requirements towards environmental hazard mitigation, emergency preparedness, contamination control, and "cultural resource monitoring".

The Aviation Division of WSDOT chose Chehalis–Centralia Airport in 2021 as one of six beta-test sites in Washington state to be used as an airfield for electric aircraft. The same year, the airport was awarded $59,000 through the Airport Rescue Grant via the American Rescue Plan Act of 2021 due to COVID-19 pandemic economic hardships.

Airport landholdings expanded in late 2023 with a $316,000 purchase of a surplus property owned by the city. Known as the Barnes property, it is located directly south of Airport Lake and though the land is within the levee, the area is prone to minor flooding due to a small creek on the grounds. No immediate plans for the usage of the new property by the airport were proposed. Expansion of the northern section of airport was begun in 2024 under a plan known as the Chehalis Hub for Aviation Innovation and Sustainable Energy (CHAISE), a project meant to help the airport to produce renewable energy and as a site for the demonstration of new aviation technology.

The Chehalis city council formally adopted a required FAA master plan in February 2025, the first since 2001. The airport is estimated to reach approximately 70,000 flight operations per year by 2045.

=== Accidents and incidents ===
Four people were killed in a September 1951 plane crash. The Stinson Voyager caught fire a minute after take off from the airfield. In September 1959, the body of Sherry Edgell, a nine year-old girl from Centralia, was found near the airport. The murder of Edgell remains unsolved.

During the Columbus Day storm of 1962, 13 aircraft were destroyed due to wind gusts reaching as high as 95 miles per hour (153 km/h). A police chief suffered a skull fracture when he was struck by debris after one of the hangars blew apart during the storm.

In March 1991, a passenger died during the crash of a Piper PA-24 Comanche into a building near the airport. The plane, which was found later to have an "improperly seated crankshaft gear" that led to other failures of the craft, was diverting to the Chehalis-Centralia Airport for an emergency landing. A father and son survived a plane crash outside the Chehalis-Centralia Airport in January 1997. The plane dove nose first after its engine died during flight. The Piper Arrow clipped its wing on the ground of a corn field during the attempted landing.

A two-seat, Grumman American AA-1 single-engine plane crashed into a pond south of the runway in December 2002. The crash was caused due to an attempt to land under an incoming fog bank. Both passengers, a father and son, survived, but the older man suffered brain injuries stemming from being underwater for an extended time.

Three men died after their twin-engine Cessna, which departed from the airport, crashed near Glenoma in October 2010. The pilot, Ken Sabin, was a board member of the Chehalis-Centralia Airport. He reported a loss of power to an engine. The airport board proposed the following year that a portion of Airport Way, which leads to the terminal area, be renamed in Sabin's honor. Another loss of life after a crash occurred in August 2014 when the pilot of a Loehle 5151 Mustang crashed into a local business parking lot across the interstate, setting fire to the aircraft and several automobiles. Despite ideal flight conditions, it was concluded that the takeoff was "unclean" as the plane was reported to bounce off the tarmac. The plane, which flew without a filed flight plan, achieved lift but struggled with instability, making an extreme bank before crashing.

=== Flooding ===
During the Second World War, the United States Department of War built levees around the airfield and in 1942 installed a levee pump.

Two large floods in 1990 and 1996 caused severe inundations at the airfield, damaging some aircraft. The events, in association with levee regulations at airports, led to 430,000 cubic yards (330,000 m^{3}) of fill added to the grounds meant to raise buildings 8 feet (2.4 m) above the high-water mark of a flood event.

During severe flooding due to the Great Coastal Gale of 2007, the airfield was underwater by as much 8 feet (2.4 m) and 2 inches (5.1 cm) of silt and mud covered the runway. During the ordeal, the original 1942 pump failed, forcing an intentional break of the levee that led to increased damages in the community. In preparation of a 2009 flood, fifty aircraft that could not be evacuated were moved to atop the levee.

A modern, electric two-pump station was completed in 2018 with funding provided by the Chehalis River Basin Authority at a cost of $1.14 million. The pumps, able to siphon as much as 12,000 gallons per minute, worked without fail during a January 2022 flood event.

== Notable aviators ==
The earliest recorded aviator in the area was John Brown, who attempted to construct an airplane at the Tynan Opera House in Chehalis. However, there is no record that the apparatus ever achieved flight. The first aviator to achieve flight in Lewis County was Claude Berlin, a local grocer who undertook flying lessons to become a licensed pilot. He officially piloted a Curtiss biplane over Centralia on May 30, 1912 during the city's Hub City Festival, attempting to bless new buildings by dropping champagne bottles during the flight. He hit at least one of the targets. In 1914, Gustav (George) Stromer took flight during Chehalis' Fourth of July celebrations, and after several issues of mechanics and strong winds, managed to land on the fields at the Green Hill School. Stromer would perform the first recorded night flights in the region, and after a week of performances, survived a crash north of Centralia at Waunch Prairie, ending his flying pursuits in the Twin Cities.

Other early aviators include the first woman pilot, listed only as Mrs. Crown, and Kenneth Arnold, famed for his report on flying saucers in 1947.

=== Scott Crossfield ===
Scott Crossfield, a test pilot, grew up in nearby Boistfort, Washington and used the airfield in his youth, learning to fly. His first recorded solo flight occurred from what was then known as the Chehalis Municipal Field. In recognition of Crossfield, the airport terminal was named in his honor during a dedication ceremony in 2010, four years after his death; a display of Crossfield's life is located within the building.

== Facilities and aircraft ==
Chehalis–Centralia Airport covers 438 acres (177 ha), which contains one asphalt runway: 16/34 measuring 5,000 by 140 feet (1,524 m × 43 m). The airport does not contain an air traffic control tower. Surrounded by a levee built by the United States Army Corps of Engineers, the airport also contains an oxbow lake, aptly named Airport Lake, at the northeast portion of the field. The lake is a remnant of the Chehalis River and waters are drained by pump over the levee and by a small tunnel.

By 1975, the airport had seen the construction of six hangars.

Airfield reports in 1975 listed between 45 and 50 based aircraft with a daily average of 50 flights. In 2004, the airport reported an average range of 35,000 to 40,000 takeoffs and landings per year. For the 12-month period ending June 30, 2011, the airport had 47,710 total operations, an average of 131 per day: 90% general aviation, 9% air taxi, and <1% military. There were 105 aircraft listed as based at the airport: 81% single-engine, 5% multi-engine, 3% jet, 8% helicopter, 2% ultralight, and 2% glider. A master plan update in 2023 reported an annual operations total of approximately 50,000 flights and the airport was a base for 56 aircraft; over half the flight operations were listed as belonging to small business jets. The 2025 master plan report listed hangar space at 100% capacity.

A reproduction of a Douglas World Cruiser, known as the Seattle II, was stored at the airport in the early 2020s. Originally meant to be flown to retrace the route of the original Seattle during the first aerial circumnavigation of the planet in 1924, international complications prevented the historic attempt. The Liberty V-12 engine-powered craft was flown over Boeing Field for the company's 100th anniversary and is being decommissioned, with plans to be installed at the Museum of Flight in Tukwila, Washington.

=== Airport Levee Trail ===
The Airport Levee Trail is mixed paved-gravel path built atop the dike surrounding the airport and loops for 3.5 miles (5.6 km) around the airfield and the Twin City Town Center. Built in large part by community efforts and $300,000 in funding from TransAlta, the trail was first available for use in 2010. The trail provides additional views of the Riverside Golf Course, surrounding farmland, and views of the Chehalis River.

=== Artworks ===
The Chehalis-Centralia Airport is home to a collage mural, Chehalis Celebrates Aviation, that highlights airplane history in the city.

=== Interpretive park ===
An interpretive park is located at the south end entrance of the airstrip. Containing sheltered interpretive panels on the history of the airfield, visitors can also watch aircraft operations. The signs include graphics detailing the life history of Scott Crossfield.

== Commercial service ==
As of 2024, the Chehalis–Centralia Airport is not served by a commercial airline. West Coast Airlines (WCA) previously operated scheduled flights, including round-trips, from Chehalis beginning in October 1946. The original aircraft used was a Douglas DC-3 Mainliner, seating 21 passengers. Airmail service was provided the following month. Evening flights were temporarily suspended in summer 1953 by request of the WCA after an unlighted TV tower antenna was constructed 1,500 feet (457.2 m) from the end of the runway.

Due to limited passenger numbers, WCA terminated their contract with the airport in September 1958.

== Training and flight programs ==
The Lewis County Civil Air Patrol is stationed at the airport. Providing limited free instruction to people as young as 12 years old, the program offers a flight academy with the possibility to earn a pilot's license. The airport also hosts a chapter of the Experimental Aircraft Association (EAA) Flying Start Program, a guidance course meant for adults over the age of 18. The half-day class provides free mentorship, a first flight, and instructions on how to continue flight training in the future.

An annual event that coincides with the city's ChehalisFest celebration, the airport hosts free flights for children and teenagers. Referred to as "Young Eagle Flights", a chapter of the EAA, young flyers may even briefly handle the controls of the aircraft.

The airport has been host as a layover stop for the Goodyear Blimp during trips along the West Coast. The blimp, visiting every few years, provides free tour flights while stationed at the field.

== Economy ==
Several businesses of various size and notability operate on airport land which is part of Chehalis' Twin City Town Center district. The CLS began its commercial and retail business expansion in 1993 by leasing over 15 acres (6.1 ha) to Wal-Mart for a lump sum payment of $1.8 million. The airport used a portion of the funds for improvements to airport facilities. Further large companies followed, such a Kmart and in 2006, Home Depot. By 2004, approximately 38 acres (15 ha) of airport land had been converted to commercial space with a lease revenue of $700,000.

Economic reports from 2021 and 2022 specify that over 1100 jobs are supported by the airport and the shopping district, with over 500 additional positions of employment that are connected due to the existence of the airfield. The airport receives no annual tax stipend from the state, and is considered "financially self-sustaining", generating $1.2 million in tax revenue to Chehalis and Lewis County and an additional $7.8 million for Washington state.

As of 2023, the 2018 levee pump build was estimated to have a return on investment of $39 for every $1 in construction cost, protecting approximately $45 million in property.

== See also ==
- List of airports in Washington
- Packwood Airport
- South Lewis County Airport
