= Harry A. Siler =

American politician

Member of the Washington House of Representatives for the 20th district
- In office 1949–1965

Personal details
- Born: September 24, 1898 Winlock, Washington, United States
- Died: April 25, 1981 (aged 82) Washington, United States
- Party: Republican

Harry Alvin Siler (September 24, 1898 – April 25, 1981) was an American politician in the state of Washington. He served in the Washington House of Representatives from 1959 to 1965.
