= Evaline, Washington =

Unincorporated community in Washington, United States

- Unincorporated community
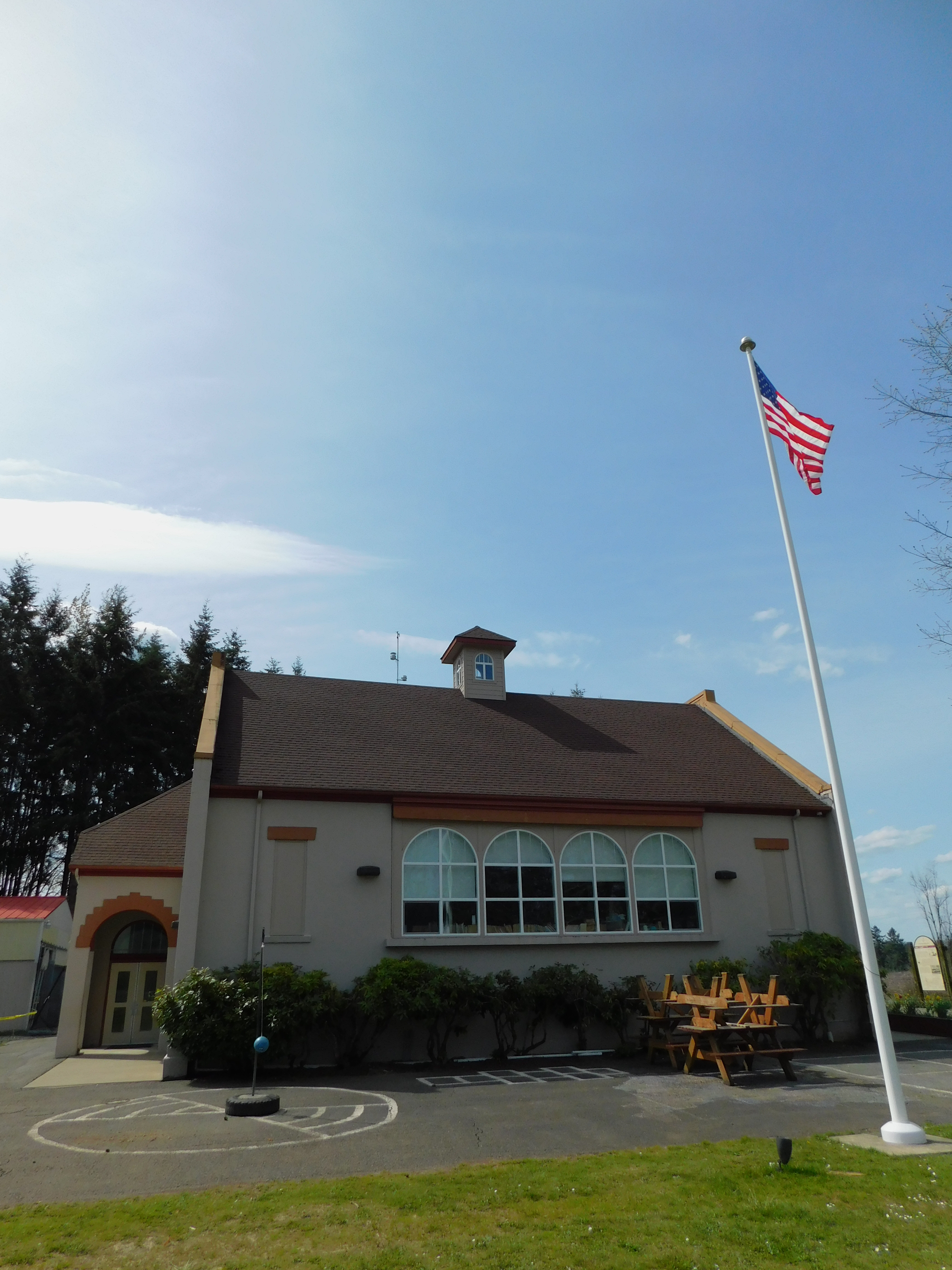
- The two-room schoolhouse, Evaline Elementary School

- Location within Washington (state) Location within the United States
- Coordinates: 46°32′22″N 122°56′17″W
- Country: United States
- State: Washington
- County: Lewis
- Elevation: 423 ft (129 m)
- Time zone: UTC-8 (Pacific (PST))
  - Summer (DST): UTC-7 (PDT)
- ZIP Code: 98596
- Area code(s): 360, 564
- GNIS feature ID: 1510955

Evaline is an unincorporated community in Washington, United States. The community is located south of Napavine and 3 miles (4.8 km) north of Winlock on State Route 603. The rural, residential area is known for the Evaline School, one of the last two-room schoolhouses in the state.

Beginning in 1906, a name for the community was required. After a few submissions were denied, the moniker was taken from Evaline Porter, an early settler in the area. Competing histories of the original spelling of her name, which may have been "Eveline", led to confusion over the proper listing of the community's name during its early years.

== Etymology ==
Sedate "Jim" Wadsworth Porter, who owned a sawmill in the community, was asked to name the community in 1906 by a railroad company. Porter first submitted his own surname, but another town in Washington had been listed under the moniker. He then offered the name of Brown, but his suggestion was rebuffed as it "wouldn't fly". Porter then chose the town's name after his wife.

There are conflicting histories regarding the spelling of Mrs. Porter's first name. Reports mention her name was officially, "Evaline", and the registered name for the community misspelled as "Eveline". Subsequently, the records mention that the railroad company used the incorrect spelling for some time. Oppositely, her name is recorded to have been spelled as "Eveline". Maps of the area, and railroad companies, used the incorrect "Evaline" spelling and it remained as such. Mrs. Porter was reported to change the spelling of her own name to match the Evaline moniker.

== History ==
The earliest white settlers in this area were the Urquharts and the MacDonalds. Sedate Porter, who also operated a general store, founded the town and established the post office in his store on Feb. 14, 1906; it remained open until 1930.

The Northern Pacific Railroad (NP) began operations from Kalama to Evaline, a 25-mile (40 km) stretch, in 1872; a rail spur by either NP or Great Northern Railroad was constructed into the community in 1906.

Farming and sawmill production were early economic industries in Evaline, with agriculture a focus that lasted throughout the 20th century. By the early 2000s, the community was considered mostly residential, with a large portion of the populace commuting to work elsewhere. The community was also listed to include a significant population of retired residents.

== Geography ==
Evaline is a rural community located approximately halfway between Napavine and Winlock, 3 miles (4.8 km) to the north, on State Route 603.

== Arts and culture ==
The Hope Grange was founded in Evaline in March 1904. Named as such to "boost courage and hopes", a hall was built soon thereafter, and the grange officially incorporated in June 1948. The hall was remodeled to include a kitchen in 1949 and the building, which was originally constructed with a 4-seat outhouse, added a modern bathroom in 1969.

== Government and politics ==
Presidential Elections Results
Year	Republican	Democratic	Third parties
2008	61.7% 266	36.2% 156	2.1% 9
2012	61.6% 276	35.3% 158	3.1% 14
2016	74.5% 382	20.1% 103	5.5% 28
2020	72.1% 408	25.8% 146	2.1% 12
2024	71.7% 424	24.7% 146	3.6% 21

=== Politics ===
As Evaline is an unincorporated community, there are no defined bounds, and the precinct may be incongruous with the census boundaries.

The 2020 election included 9 votes for candidates of the Libertarian Party and 2 votes for write-in candidates. In the 2024 election, there were 4 votes cast for write-in candidates and 12 votes were tallied for Robert F. Kennedy Jr..

== Education ==
The Evaline School District (ESD) began in 1883 and oversees the two-room K-6 Evaline Elementary School. Middle school and high school students attend schools in Winlock. The ESD is the longest, uninterrupted operating school district in the county.

The original schoolhouse was a log cabin structure built in 1883 and was known as the Little Brown School after its first teacher, Mrs. John Brown. The first school, lost due to damages from a fallen tree, was replaced in 1890 by a one-room facility; the new building remained known as Brown's School. By 1906, it was renamed after the town. The school underwent several revisions in the early 20th century, being replaced in 1908 with a two-room building that housed first grade to eighth grade; (Note: The two rooms were referred to as the "big room" and "little room". A basement which ran the entire footprint of the school was often used for softball games.) a four-room addition was completed in 1913.

The current, two-room schoolhouse was constructed in 1925 after a large fire of the previous structure. The historic school was built using 24 ft × 24 ft (7.3 m × 7.3 m) wooden beams and school baseball teams at the time featured both boys and girls.. Attempts in the 1950s to close small schoolhouses in the state threatened the continued operations of Evaline School as did efforts of consolidation with Napavine School District in the 1980s; neither attempt came to fruition. By 2002, the average annual student count was listed between 40 to 50 students.

The community held a 100th anniversary of the original Little Brown School in 1983 and in the early 2000s, an old bell from one of the early Evaline schools was donated to the schoolhouse. An $890,000 modernization and expansion project of the school began in 2011; students were temporarily bussed for a year to a makeshift school at a Cowlitz Indian Tribe housing complex in Toledo.

The two-room Evaline School is one of the last such schools of its type in the state.
