= Winlock, Washington =

- City
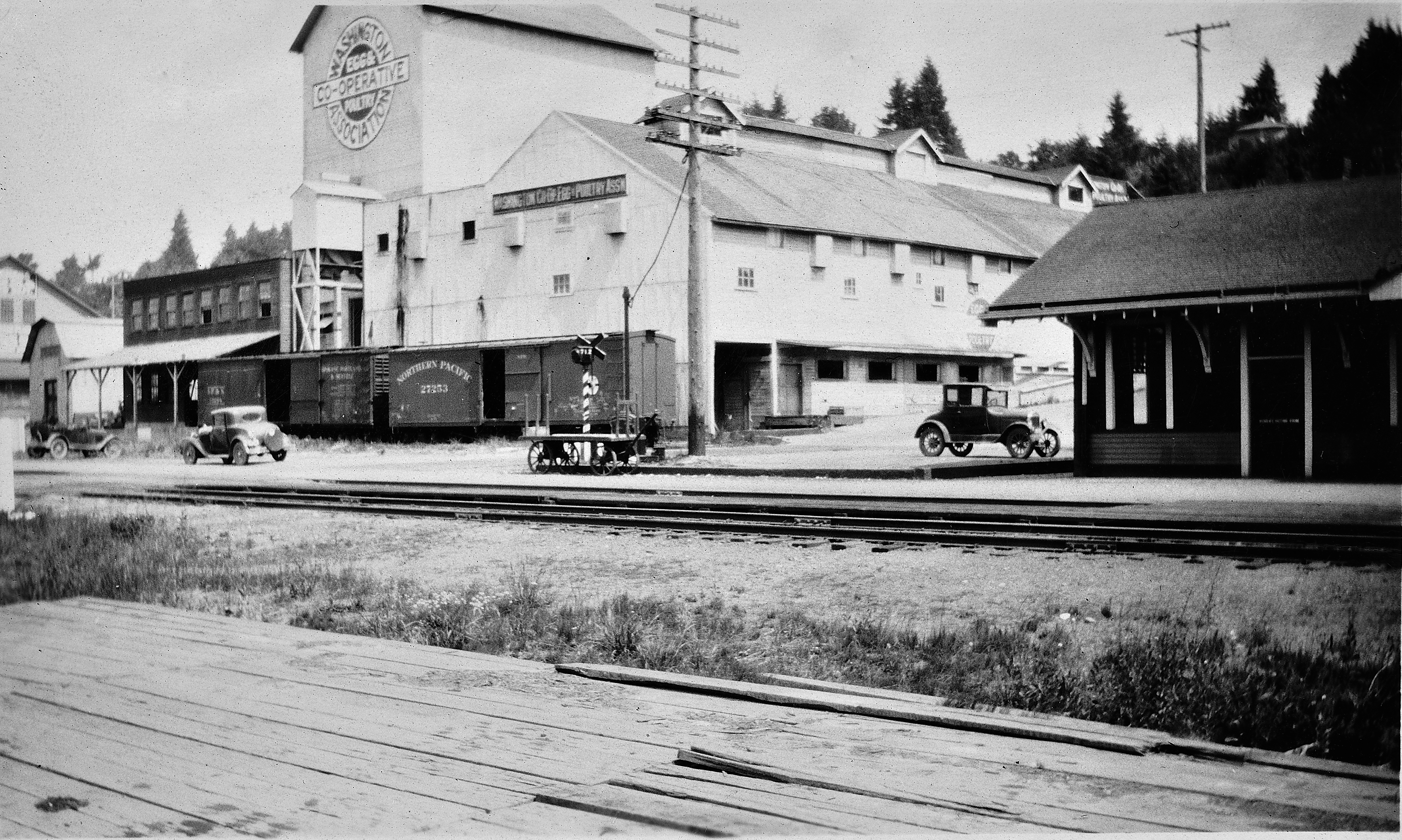
- Washington Co-op building, Winlock, c. 1930

- Location of Winlock, Washington
- Coordinates: 46°29′26″N 122°55′06″W
- Country: United States
- State: Washington
- County: Lewis
- Founded: 1871
- Incorporated: February 28, 1883
- Named for: General William Winlock Miller

Government
  - Mayor: Brandon Svenson

Area
  - Total: 3.38 sq mi (8.76 km^{2})
  - Land: 3.38 sq mi (8.76 km^{2})
  - Water: 0 sq mi (0.00 km^{2}) 0.0%
- Elevation: 358 ft (109 m)

Population (2020)
  - Total: 1,472
  - Estimate (2024): 2,515
  - Density: 1,926.6/sq mi (743.86/km^{2})
- Time zone: UTC–8 (Pacific (PST))
  - Summer (DST): UTC–7 (CDT)
- ZIP Code: 98596
- Area codes: 360 and 564
- FIPS code: 53-79275
- GNIS feature ID: 2412283
- Website: cityofwinlock.com

Winlock (/wɪnlək/) is a city in Lewis County, Washington, United States. The population was 1,472 at the 2020 census, and was estimated to be 2,515 in 2024. It was named after territorial army general, William Winlock Miller, who briefly resided there. Winlock is mostly famous for having the World's Largest Egg, reflecting its former status as a major producer of eggs. Early in its history, Winlock attracted many immigrants from Finland, Germany, and Sweden.

== History ==
=== Origin ===
Winlock began as a Northern Pacific Railroad construction camp called Wheeler's Camp in c. 1871. The railroad was then in the process of extending its line from Kalama to Tacoma, Washington. Dr. C. C. Pagett, an early resident, donated the land for the townsite. In 1873, he named it for General William Winlock Miller of Olympia, a man of some renown in the area. Miller had promised to give a school bell to the town if it were to be named after him. The town was incorporated on February 28, 1883.

=== Early economy ===
Lumbering was the initial economic driver. A number of sawmills were established beginning in the late 1800s. In the late 1920s there were four mills in operation, employing 350 men and producing over 30 million board feet of fir lumber annually.

Agriculture developed in the early 1900s with the impetus on the raising of poultry and the production of eggs. A Finnish immigrant, Impi Erving, began as a poulterer in Winlock in the 1900s, out-earning her husband Jacob's farm and cattle business. Jacob installed a kerosene-powered incubator in a bedroom of their house and the family was producing 500,000 eggs annually in a few years. Jacob Irving later constructed a 40,000 egg capacity temperature-controlled incubator system in Winlock in the early 1920s. Business entrepreneur John Marcotte opened the Cowlitz Produce Company at Winlock's Leonard Building in 1913, selling eggs from local farmers. The business reached $2,000,000 (equivalent to $32,142,857 in 2025) in sales by the 1920s.

A branch of the Washington Cooperative Egg & Poultry Association (WCEPA) was opened in Winlock in 1920. The organization constructed and operated out of a large building in Winlock that remains in the present day at the north end of town near the railroad tracks. The facility housed grain storage bins and accommodated poultry processing. The WCEPA recorded 175 local farmers as part of its membership. Several other hatcheries were located in the town. More than 750,000 baby chicks were produced during the 1928 season.

In 1922, The Lewis County Advocate noted that the only American city that produced more eggs than Winlock was Petaluma, California. In a single weekend in 1923, Winlock shipped 38,400 dozen eggs to New York state. Winlock at that time was touted as the "Egg and Poultry Capital of the World" and was also known as "the egg nest of the West".

Due to an increase of raising chickens locally around the country during the 1930s, as well as more reliance on trucking for delivery, larger hatcheries, and processing facilities, Winlock's egg production began to "lose ground". By the 1950s, egg farms in the town had considerably waned. The Winlock-based Washington Cooperative Egg & Poultry Association shuttered in 1963. Three hatcheries and six producers were reported to be operational by 1971; one remaining hatchery was noted to exist in the Winlock area in 1996.

=== 21st century ===
A fire in Winlock's downtown area consumed the city's historic Warne's Drug Store building in late 2022. The structure was built in 1911 but burned down the following year. Rebuilt soon thereafter, the building housed the now-defunct Winlock News and Winlock Phone Company, as well as other various businesses for the next century. At the time of loss, the location was used as a hostel for six years.

An annexation proposal by the city to incorporate Winlock's urban growth area (UGA) was dismissed in 2023 by the Lewis County Supreme Court over a combination of protests from residents in the UGA and the questions of statutory and filing periods and connected legal authority. The UGA, formed from a county contract in 2006, is recorded as containing 1,335 acres (540 ha) with a population of 335 residents. A citizen-led petition for the proposal to be reviewed by the Washington State Boundary Review Board for Lewis County exceeded the minimum voting requirements and a subsequent unanimous approval of the annexation by the board occurred in August of that year. The annexation was adopted by a majority vote of the Winlock city council that autumn.

== Geography ==
According to the United States Census Bureau, the city has a total area of 3.381 square miles (8.76 km^{2}), of which 3.381 square miles (8.76 km^{2}) is land and 0.000 square miles (0 km^{2}) (0.00%) is water. The city grew an additional 1,355 acres (2.1 sq mi) after the 2023 UGA annexation.

Olequa Creek, a main tributary of the Cowlitz River, runs through the center of town from north to south.

The eastern edge of the Willapa Hills lie to the west. To the east are relatively flat prairies. A notable landmark about four miles west of town is Sam Henry Mountain, elevation 1,492 feet (455 m), named for an early section superintendent of the Northern Pacific Railroad. Mt. St. Helens, about forty miles (64 km) to the east can be seen from viewpoints around the area. In May 1980, Winlock was covered with about one inch (2.5 cm) of volcanic ash from the second major eruption of this peak one week after the cataclysmic eruption of May 18.

== Demographics ==
Historical population
Census	Pop.	Note	%±
1900	655		—
1910	1,140		74.0%
1920	832		−27.0%
1930	864		3.8%
1940	861		−0.3%
1950	878		2.0%
1960	808		−8.0%
1970	890		10.1%
1980	1,052		18.2%
1990	1,027		−2.4%
2000	1,166		13.5%
2010	1,339		14.8%
2020	1,472		9.9%
2024 (est.)	2,515		70.9%
U.S. Decennial Census; 2020 Census

=== Racial and ethnic composition ===
Winlock, Washington – racial and ethnic composition Note: the US Census treats Hispanic/Latino as an ethnic category. This table excludes Latinos from the racial categories and assigns them to a separate category. Hispanics/Latinos may be of any race.
Race / ethnicity (NH = non-Hispanic)	Pop. 2000	Pop. 2010	Pop. 2020	% 2000	% 2010	% 2020
White alone (NH)	1,014	1,085	1,062	86.96%	81.03%	72.15%
Black or African American alone (NH)	2	8	13	0.17%	0.60%	0.88%
Native American or Alaska Native alone (NH)	8	14	24	0.69%	1.05%	1.63%
Asian alone (NH)	9	8	4	0.77%	0.60%	0.27%
Pacific Islander alone (NH)	0	4	9	0.00%	0.30%	0.61%
Other race alone (NH)	0	0	6	0.00%	0.00%	0.41%
Mixed race or multiracial (NH)	33	44	130	2.83%	3.29%	8.83%
Hispanic or Latino (any race)	100	176	224	8.58%	13.14%	15.22%
Total	1,166	1,339	1,472	100.00%	100.00%	100.00%

=== 2020 census ===
As of the 2020 census, there were 1,472 people, 523 households, and 351 families residing in the city. The median age was 34.8 years. 25.3% of residents were under the age of 18 and 15.9% were 65 years of age or older. For every 100 females there were 96.0 males, and for every 100 females age 18 and over there were 92.8 males age 18 and over.

0.0% of residents lived in urban areas, while 100.0% lived in rural areas.

Of the 523 households, 39.0% had children under the age of 18 living in them. Married-couple households accounted for 42.1%, while 17.8% had a male householder with no spouse or partner present and 28.7% had a female householder with no spouse or partner present. About 25.1% of all households were made up of individuals, and 11.3% had someone living alone who was 65 years of age or older.

There were 565 housing units, of which 7.4% were vacant. The homeowner vacancy rate was 5.1% and the rental vacancy rate was 3.7%.

Racial composition as of the 2020 census
Race	Number	Percent
White	1,111	75.5%
Black or African American	13	0.9%
American Indian and Alaska Native	30	2.0%
Asian	4	0.3%
Native Hawaiian and Other Pacific Islander	9	0.6%
Some other race	94	6.4%
Two or more races	211	14.3%
Hispanic or Latino (of any race)	224	15.2%

=== 2010 census ===
As of the 2010 census, there were 1,339 people, 475 households, and 327 families residing in the city. The population density was 1,038.0 inhabitants per square mile (400.8/km^{2}). There were 535 housing units at an average density of 414.7 per square mile (160.1/km^{2}). The racial makeup of the city was 84.69% White, 0.67% African American, 1.57% Native American, 0.60% Asian, 0.30% Pacific Islander, 8.36% from some other races and 3.81% from two or more races. Hispanic or Latino people of any race were 13.14% of the population.

There were 475 households, of which 38.9% had children under the age of 18 living with them, 46.5% were married couples living together, 13.5% had a female householder with no husband present, 8.8% had a male householder with no wife present, and 31.2% were non-families. 24.6% of all households were made up of individuals, and 9.9% had someone living alone who was 65 years of age or older. The average household size was 2.79 and the average family size was 3.26.

The median age in the city was 34 years. 30.2% of residents were under the age of 18; 7.6% were between the ages of 18 and 24; 26.2% were from 25 to 44; 23.9% were from 45 to 64; and 12.1% were 65 years of age or older. The gender makeup of the city was 51.2% male and 48.8% female.

=== 2000 census ===
As of the 2000 census, there were 1,166 people, 420 households, and 286 families residing in the city. The population density was 1,073.6 inhabitants per square mile (414.5/km^{2}). There were 462 housing units at an average density of 425.4 per square mile (164.2/km^{2}). The racial makeup of the city was 88.25% White, 0.17% African American, 0.77% Native American, 0.77% Asian, 0.00% Pacific Islander, 6.17% from some other races and 3.86% from two or more races. Hispanic or Latino people of any race were 8.58% of the population.

In terms of ancestry, 22.1% were of German, 18.4% English, 12.2% American and 7.3% Irish.

There were 420 households, out of which 35.7% had children under the age of 18 living with them, 53.3% were married couples living together, 10.0% had a female householder with no husband present, and 31.7% were non-families. 26.2% of all households were made up of individuals, and 14.3% had someone living alone who was 65 years of age or older. The average household size was 2.78 and the average family size was 3.38.

In the city, the population was spread out, with 31.9% under the age of 18, 8.0% from 18 to 24, 26.5% from 25 to 44, 21.1% from 45 to 64, and 12.5% who were 65 years of age or older. The median age was 33 years. For every 100 females, there were 95.3 males. For every 100 females age 18 and over, there were 90.9 males.

The median income for a household in the city was $30,000, and the median income for a family was $38,875. Males had a median income of $31,667 versus $20,547 for females. The per capita income for the city was $13,269. About 13.4% of families and 19.0% of the population were below the poverty line, including 30.4% of those under age 18 and 16.7% of those age 65 or over.

=== American Community Survey ===
As of the 2023 American Community Survey, there are 631 estimated households in Winlock with an average of 3.08 persons per household. The city has a median household income of $68,750. Approximately 17.6% of the city's population lives at or below the poverty line. Winlock has an estimated 59.2% employment rate, with 15.2% of the population holding a bachelor's degree or higher and 91.7% holding a high school diploma.

The top five reported ancestries (people were allowed to report up to two ancestries, thus the figures will generally add to more than 100%) were English (83.2%), Spanish (14.2%), Indo-European (2.1%), Asian and Pacific Islander (0.5%), and Other (0.0%).

== Arts and culture ==
=== Festivals and events ===
The first Winlock Egg Days Festival was held in 1921 after a paved road, known in the present day as State Route 505, was completed between the town and the extinct community of Cowlitz. Known at first as the "Poultry and Egg Day", the festival was held "sporadically" until it became an annual event in 1937; the first Egg Day Queen was first chosen the same year. (Note: The first Egg Day Queen was Olive Saari.) The festivities incorporates the city's poultry history and a local resident is honored as a festival marshal.

Since 2000, the city has hosted an annual Winlock Pickersfest (formerly known as the Winlock Bluesgrass Festival) at Winolequa Park. The festival focuses on the use of stringed instruments, particularly the banjo, and are incorporated into various musical genres including Americana, bluegrass, and jazz. The three-day event is usually held on the first weekend of August.

Since 2000, the city has hosted an annual Winlock Pickersfest (formerly known as the Winlock Bluesgrass Festival) at Winolequa Park. The festival focuses on the use of stringed instruments, particularly the banjo, and are incorporated into various musical genres including Americana, bluegrass, and jazz. The three-day event is usually held on the first weekend of August.

=== Groups and organizations ===
Winlock is home to the Hope Grange (No. 155). It was established on March 18, 1904 in Evaline, beginning with 19 members.

=== Historic buildings and sites ===
Winlock is home to the Winlock Egg, known as the "World's Largest Egg".

Situated near Olequa Creek in a residential area west of the downtown core is the Sacred Heart Catholic Church which was built in 1908. It was closed in 2014 due to financial concerns. The church was reopened as a parish of the Saint George Byzantine Catholic Church of Olympia in November 2024 after a foundation formed by local residents purchased the building that summer with the intention to remodel, repair, and preserve the historic church.

The Roth Family Barn, constructed in 1917, is listed on the Washington State Heritage Barn Register and is considered to be the "largest standing loose hay barn" in the Grand Prairie. The 56 ft × 96 ft (17 m × 29 m) structure was originally used as a dairy barn and for hay storage. A grant from WSHBR helped to repair the foundation and structural integrity of the barn; windows were also replaced. The efforts were completed in 2011.

Winlock is home to the Winlock Historical Museum, located across from city hall at the Winlock Firehouse. In the past, the building was also used as a jail. The museum contains logging, veterinarian, and other vintage tools, signs of extinct businesses, and a large library of photographs. A popular feature is a collection of class photos.

An independent museum was located in the city. Known as The Renegade Rooster, the collection originally began in 1994. Opened as a museum in 2008 near the downtown area, the repository was owned and operated by Roy Richards, a lifelong resident who showcased the history of Winlock and other nearby communities such as Vader; additional focus included egg production, farming, and railroads. The Renegade Rooster closed after Richards died in October 2020. As of 2021, the Winlock Historical Museum was in the process of securing a large portion of Richard's "Renegade Rooster Winlock History Collection".

== Parks and recreation ==
The city is home to Winolequa Park, Winlock's largest public park. Also known as Winolequa Memorial Park, it began by community volunteer effort in the 1960s and 1970s.

Since 2018, community groups and volunteers install the Winlock Memorial Christmas Tree at Vern Zander Memorial Park during the year end holiday season. As of 2024, approximately 450 ornaments containing a collection of the names of Winlock residents who have died are hung on the tree as to honor "those who are gone but will never be forgotten".

Winlock was the planned site for the Southwest Washington Regional Equestrian Center. Also known as the REQ Center, formal planning began in 2006 and the horse arena was to have a seating capacity of over 7,000 people and was estimated to cost between $50 million and $80 million. The equestrian center was projected to present a variety of professional horse and rodeo competitions. An official site was chosen in 2008 but the center's placement in Winlock was cancelled that same year after a project manager and a developer were fined after pleading guilty to illegally filling approximately 100 acres (40 ha) of wetlands at the location. In 2009, the arena was proposed to be moved to Napavine.

== Economy ==
The creation of three port authorities in Lewis County, in an attempt to overcome stagflation in the region, was begun in 1986. The Port of Centralia and Port of Chehalis were established, but the third measure to created a port between Toledo and Winlock failed after a public vote. The failed attempt was thought to be due to the area's rural local and more resilient economy during the time period.

== Government and politics ==
Presidential Elections Results
Year	Republican	Democratic	Third parties
2008	47.6 219	50.4% 232	2.0% 9
2012	52.8% 234	44.5% 197	2.7% 12
2016	57.8% 262	32.5% 147	9.7% 44
2020	61.3% 394	34.7% 223	3.1% 20
2024	62.7% 643	33.6% 344	3.7% 38

=== Government ===
The city council for Winlock consists of 5 at-large, non-partisan members. The mayor, elected by the citizens of the city, also functions as Winlock's chief administrative officer. As of 2025, the mayor of Winlock is Brandon Svenson. In 2026, Svenson will be proceeded by Victoria Marincin.

=== Politics ===
In the 2024 election, there were 8 votes cast for write-in candidates and 18 votes were tallied for Robert F. Kennedy Jr..

== Education ==
=== Sports ===
Winlock High School's football team won Class B state titles in 1955, 1958, and 1959. Since the 1920s, a senior player is chosen annually to receive the Otis Roundtree Award, named for a local resident who played for the Washington Huskies in the 1890s.

== Infrastructure ==
State Route 505 begins in Winlock and runs east to Interstate 5 and beyond to the city of Toledo. State Route 603, a former state highway, continues north from Winlock to intersect with State Route 6 near Chehalis.

The BNSF Railway's Seattle Subdivision, a double track railroad, runs through the middle of the town. Union Pacific and Amtrak trains also use these tracks. The nearest Amtrak station is Centralia.

Winlock began constructing a fiber optic expansion of a regional broadband project in 2023. The initiative is led by a grant of $23.5 million from the Washington State Broadband Office with an additional $2.3 million from a regional communications company. Once completed, the broadband system will be owned by Lewis County. The venture was originally planned to be completed in 2024, but forecasted out to late 2026.

== Notable residents ==
- Harry A. Siler, state legislator
