= Eveline Street =

Popular Namibian street

Eveline Street is a street in Windhoek, Namibia. It is located in the Greenwell Matongo area of Katutura. The street is prominent for its bars, shops and eateries but also for its crime activities. In 2016, the government of Namibia resolved in parliament to shut down shebeens in the street, claiming it was the reason for crime activities in the location. However, the decision did not succeed with the opposition claiming shebeens were a source of income to many Namibians.
