= Poco discography =

- Studio albums: 19
- Live albums: 9
- Compilation albums: 30
- Singles: 24

The following lists in detail the discography of Poco. The group's most successful albums were Legend in 1978 and Legacy in 1989, each being certified gold.

One of Poco's singles reached number one on the Billboard adult contemporary chart, "Crazy Love" in 1979. That song, along with 1979's "Heart of the Night" and "Call It Love" in 1989, were top 20 hits for the group on the Billboard Hot 100.

== Albums ==
=== Studio albums ===
Title	Details	Peak chart positions					Certifications (sales threshold)
Title	Details	US	US Country	AUS	CAN	CAN Country	Certifications (sales threshold)
Pickin' Up the Pieces	Release date: May 19, 1969; Label: Epic Records	63	—	—	—	—	
Poco	Release date: May 6, 1970; Label: Epic Records	58	—	34	15	—	
From the Inside	Release date: September 5, 1971; Label: Epic Records	52	—	—	45	—	
A Good Feelin' to Know	Release date: September 25, 1972; Label: Epic Records	69	—	63	66	—	
Crazy Eyes	Release date: September 15, 1973; Label: Epic Records	38	—	—	95	—	
Seven	Release date: April 12, 1974; Label: Epic Records	68	—	—	61	—	
Cantamos	Release date: November 1, 1974; Label: Epic Records	76	—	—	99	—	
Head over Heels	Release date: July 1975; Label: ABC Records	43	—	—	87	—	
Rose of Cimarron	Release date: May 26, 1976; Label: ABC Records	89	—	54	—	—	
Indian Summer	Release date: May 1977; Label: ABC Records	57	—	75	—	—	
Legend	Release date: November 1978; Label: ABC Records	14	15	52	12	21	US: Gold; CAN: Gold
Under the Gun	Release date: July 1980; Label: MCA Records	46	—	68	38	—	
Blue and Gray	Release date: July 1981; Label: MCA Records	76	—	—	—	—	
Cowboys & Englishmen	Release date: February 1982; Label: MCA Records	131	—	—	—	—	
Ghost Town	Release date: September 20, 1982; Label: Atlantic Records	195	—	—	—	—	
Inamorata	Release date: April 16, 1984; Label: Atlantic Records	167	—	—	—	—	
Legacy	Release date: August 29, 1989; Label: RCA Records	40	—	—	55	—	US: Gold
Running Horse	Release date: November 18, 2002; Label: Drifter's Church	—	—	—	—	—	
All Fired Up	Release date: March 5, 2013; Label: Drifter's Church	—	—	—	—	—	
"—" denotes releases that did not chart

=== Live albums ===
Year	Album	Chart positions	
Year	Album	US	CAN
1971	Deliverin'	26	42
1976	Live	169	—
2004	The Last Roundup	—	—
2004	Keeping the Legend Alive	—	—
2005	Bareback at Big Sky	—	—
2006	The Wildwood Sessions	—	—
2010	Live from Columbia Studios, Hollywood 9/30/1971	—	—
2011	Setlist: The Very Best of Poco Live	—	—
2014	Crazy Love	—	—
2019	Amsterdamed	—	—
2019	Live Wollman Memorial Skating Rink 1975	—	—

=== Compilation albums ===
Year	Album	Chart Positions
Year	Album	US
1975	The Very Best of Poco	90
1979	Ride the Country	—
1979	Poco: The Songs of Paul Cotton	—
1980	Poco: The Songs of Richie Furay	—
1980	The Best Of	—
1982	Backtracks	209
1989	Crazy Loving: The Best of Poco 1975-1982	—
1990	Retrospective	—
1990	The Forgotten Trail (1969-74)	—
1995	Ghost Town/Inamorata	—
1996	On the Country Side	—
1997	The Essential Collection (1975-1982)	—
1998	The Ultimate Collection 69-89	—
1999	The Very Best of Poco	—
2000	20th Century Masters - The Millennium Collection	—
2001	Take Two	—
2002	The Very Best of Poco	—
2002	From the Inside/A Good Feelin' to Know	—
2004	Pickin' Up the Pieces/Poco	—
2005	Alive in the Heart of the Night	—
2006	Keep on Tryin'	—
2006	Poco Live	—
2006	The Essential Poco	—
2006	Gold	—
2006	Best of Poco Live	—
2006	Seven/Cantamos	—
2007	Standing Room Only Live	—
2008	Original Album Classics	—
2011	Under the Gun/Blue and the Gray	—
2011	Head Over Heels/Rose of Cimarron	—
2018	Collected 1969 - 2017 (NL)	—

== Singles ==
Year	Single	Peak chart positions								Album
Year	Single	US	US Main	US AC	US Country	AUS	CAN	CAN AC	CAN Country	Album
1970	"You Better Think Twice"	72	—	—	—	—	61	—	—	Poco
1971	"C'mon"	69	—	—	—	—	—	—	—	Deliverin'
1971	"Just for Me and You"	110	—	—	—	—	—	—	—	From the Inside
1972	"A Good Feelin' to Know"	—	—	—	—	—	—	—	—	A Good Feelin' to Know
1974	"Faith in the Families"	—	—	—	—	—	—	—	—	Seven
1975	"Keep On Tryin'"	50	—	23	—	—	61	21	—	Head Over Heels
1976	"Rose of Cimarron"	94	—	—	—	51	—	—	—	Rose of Cimarron
1977	"Indian Summer"	50	—	39	—	—	68	43	—	Indian Summer
1979	"Crazy Love"	17	—	1	95	73	15	4	—	Legend
1979	"Heart of the Night"	20	—	5	96	—	18	6	37	Legend
1979	"Legend"	103	—	—	—	—	—	—	—	Legend
1980	"Midnight Rain"	74	—	42	—	—	—	—	—	Under the Gun
1980	"Under the Gun"	48	—	—	—	—	56	—	—	Under the Gun
1980	"The Everlasting Kind"	—	—	—	—	—	—	—	—	Under the Gun
1981	"Widowmaker"	—	33	—	—	—	—	—	—	Blue and Gray
1982	"Sea of Heartbreak"	109	—	35	—	—	—	26	—	Cowboys & Englishmen
1982	"Ghost Town"	108	—	—	—	—	—	—	—	Ghost Town
1982	"Break Of Hearts"	—	—	—	—	—	—	—	—	Ghost Town
1983	"Shoot for the Moon"	50	—	10	—	—	—	—	—	Ghost Town
1984	"This Old Flame"	—	—	—	—	—	—	—	—	Inamorata
1984	"Save A Corner Of Your Heart"	—	—	—	—	—	—	—	—	Inamorata
1984	"Days Gone By"	80	58	—	—	—	—	—	—	Inamorata
1989	"Call It Love"	18	2	2	—	—	11	22	82	Legacy
1989	"Nothin' to Hide"	39	—	10	—	—	25	8	—	Legacy
1990	"The Nature of Love"	—	30	—	—	—	90	—	—	Legacy
1990	"When It All Began"	—	—	—	—	—	—	—	76	Legacy
1990	"What Do People Know"	—	—	24	—	—	71	32	—	Legacy
"—" denotes releases that did not chart
