= List of Poco band members =

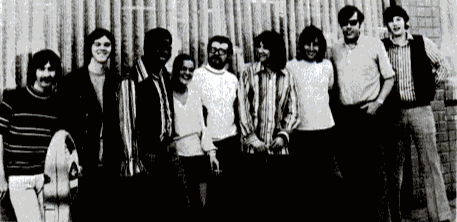
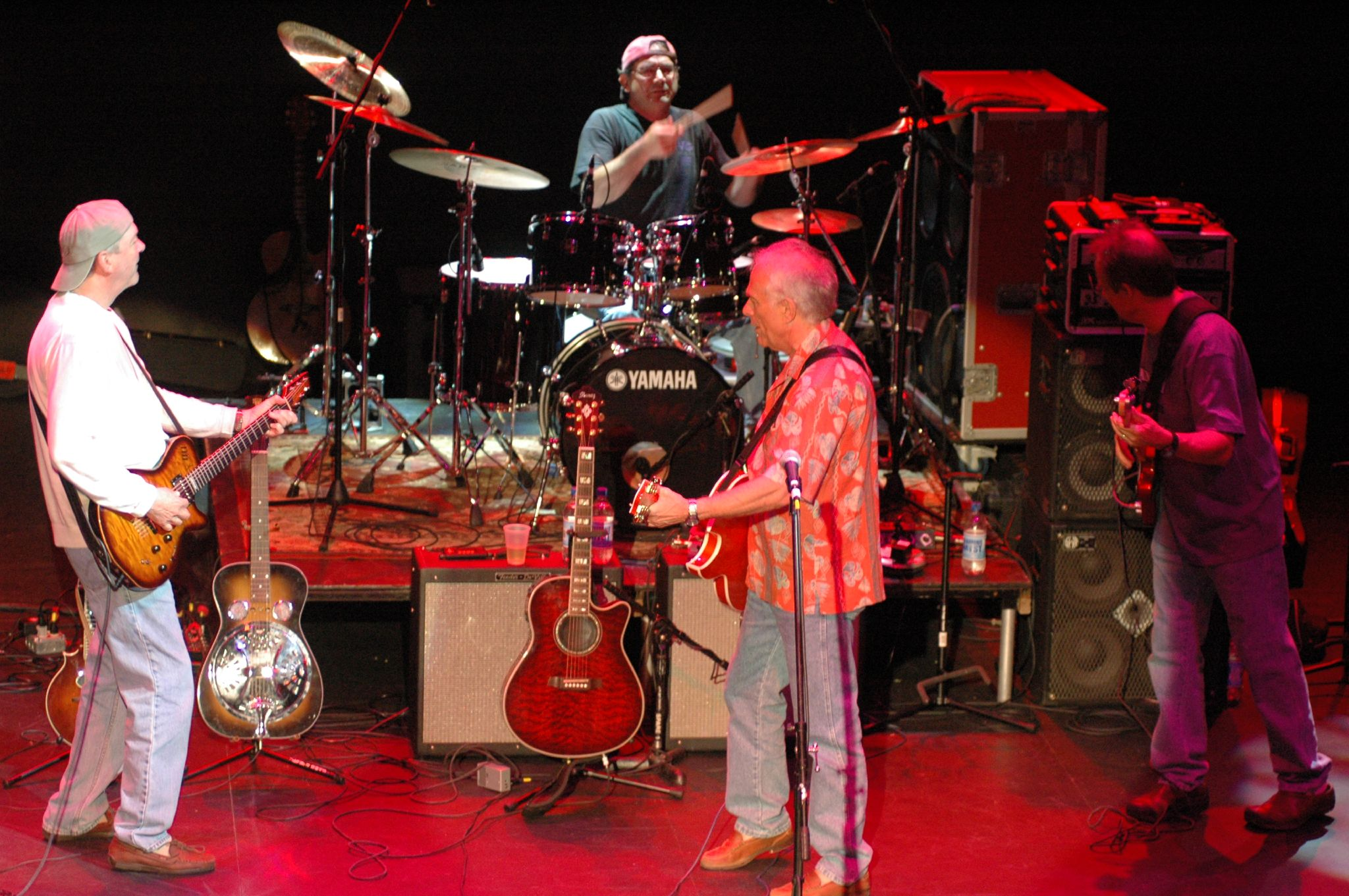
Poco members in 1970 and 2007.

Poco were an American country rock band from Los Angeles, California. Formed in July 1968, the group originally consisted of lead vocalist and rhythm guitarist Richie Furay, lead guitarist and vocalist Jim Messina, steel guitarist Norman "Rusty" Young, bassist and vocalist Randy Meisner, and drummer and vocalist George Grantham. The band disbanded following Young's death in April 2021 – the final lineup was Young alongside bassist and vocalist Jack Sundrud (1985–1987, 1990–1991, and since 2000), drummer Rick Lonow (since 2016), and guitarist and vocalist Tom Hampton (since 2020).

== History ==
=== 1968–1988 ===
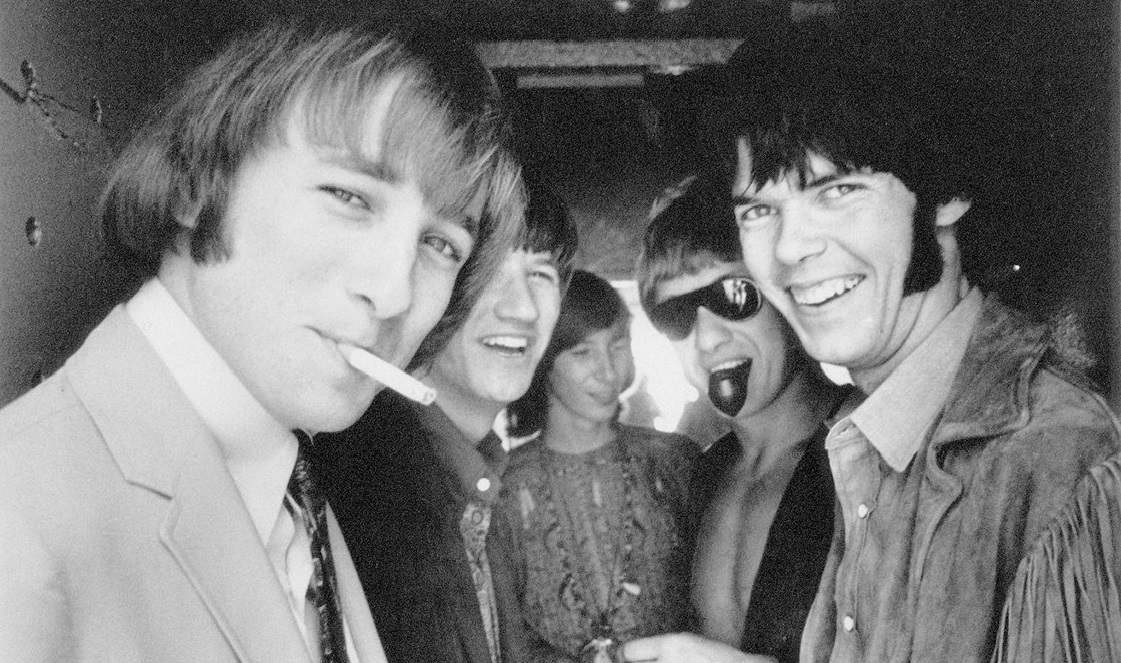
Poco was formed upon the breakup of Buffalo Springfield by Richie Furay (pictured, second from left).

Poco was formed in July 1968 by Buffalo Springfield members Richie Furay, Jim Messina and session contributor Rusty Young, with former Poor bassist Randy Meisner and Young's former bandmate George Grantham completing the initial lineup. Shortly after the recording of the group's debut album Pickin' Up the Pieces in early 1969, Meisner left and was replaced by Timothy B. Schmit. A self-titled second album followed in May 1970, before Messina left in October to focus on record production. He was replaced by Paul Cotton. After three albums in three years – From the Inside (1971), A Good Feelin' to Know (1972) and Crazy Eyes (1973) – Furay left in October 1973 and the remaining members opted to continue as a four-piece. Following Furay's departure, Poco was led by Cotton and Young.

The four-piece of Cotton, Young, Schmit and Grantham remained stable for almost four years, before Schmit left to join the Eagles in September 1977, coincidentally replacing Randy Meisner again after taking over his position in Poco eight years prior. With the group taking a brief hiatus, Grantham left in January 1978, leaving Young as the sole remaining original member. Within a few months, Cotton and Young had enlisted bassist Charlie Harrison and drummer Steve Chapman to record Legend, which was released that November. The following month, the group added Kim Bullard as its first keyboardist to become a five-piece again.

After a string of releases, Bullard left Poco following the tour in promotion of 1982's Ghost Town, joining Stephen Stills' solo band in the summer of 1983. Following the release of Inamorata the following year, Bullard and bassist Harrison were replaced by Rick Seratte and Jeff Steele, respectively. By early 1985, George Grantham had returned on drums and Jack Sundrud had joined on bass. The next year, Grantham backed out again and Chapman returned in his place. Poco continued touring until the summer of 1987.

=== Since 1988 ===
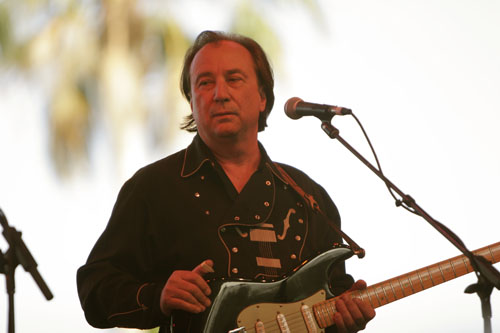
In 1988 the original lineup of Poco reunited, marking the first return of lead guitarist Jim Messina since 1970.

In late 1988, the original Poco lineup of Richie Furay, Jim Messina, Rusty Young, Randy Meisner and George Grantham reformed and recorded Legacy. After the album's 1989 release, the band returned to touring from January 1990, joined by keyboardist David Vanacore; for later shows starting in June, Furay backed out to return to his career as a church minister, with former bassist Jack Sundrud taking his place on rhythm guitar and the remaining members sharing vocal duties.

During early 1991, Poco toured as an acoustic trio featuring Messina, Young and Meisner, before Gary Mallaber joined on drums for a Japanese tour in the summer. Later in the year, Messina and Meisner left Poco again, at which point Young rebuilt the group with former lead guitarist Paul Cotton and new members Richard Neville on bass and Tim Smith on drums. This lineup remained constant for almost nine years, but did not record any new material – in early 2000, Neville and Smith were replaced by returning members Sundrud and Grantham. This lineup released Running Horse, the group's first studio album in 13 years, in November 2002.

Shortly after recording the live album Keeping the Legend Alive, Grantham was forced to temporarily stop touring with Poco after suffering a stroke; he was replaced by stand-in George Lawrence, who later became an official member of the band when Grantham was unable to return.

In early 2010, Cotton was replaced by Michael Webb, who primarily focused on keyboards in the group's lineup. The new lineup released All Fired Up in 2013. At the end of 2013, Rusty Young announced his retirement; a few shows were booked into 2014, including three farewell shows in Florida. One of those shows was a performance in a recording studio in front of a live audience for a DVD documentary of the band's live show. Young said there could be some one-off concerts in the future after that, but the band would not be actively touring as before. Young and Sundrud wrote and recorded music for children's story videos as the "Session Cats". Lawrence, Sundrud, and Webb continued to write, record, and play on their own projects and to do freelance work with other artists in Nashville. Young continued to do guest performances with former members of Poco and other country rock artists.

Poco was inducted into the Colorado Music Hall of Fame (CMHOF) with the CMHOF induction ceremony which took place at the Paramount Theatre (Denver, Colorado) on January 9, 2015, and included a one-off reunion performance with a lineup of Rusty Young and former members Richie Furay, Timothy B. Schmit, and Paul Cotton.

From 2015 through 2021, though not touring full-time, Poco played isolated dates around the US. In 2016, drummer Lawrence was replaced by Rick Lonow (formerly of The Flying Burrito Brothers). Lex Browning, Jack Sundrud's former bandmate in Great Plains, replaced Michael Webb on mandolin, fiddle, and guitar in October 2018.

By January 2020, Poco friend and fan Tom Hampton was brought in by Sundrud to replace Browning for tour dates, but touring was suddenly halted in March due to the COVID-19 pandemic.

Rusty Young died on April 14, 2021, at his home in Davisville, Missouri, from a heart attack. He was 75. Poco split after Young's death.

Three and a half months after Rusty Young's April 2021 death, his former partner in the band, Paul Cotton, died at his summer home in Eugene, Oregon at age 78 on August 1, 2021.

Fans and surviving band members released the tribute album My Friend: A Tribute To Rusty Young in March 2022 and there was a reunion/tribute "Poconut" concert on October 8, 2022, in Steelville, Missouri, near Young's home, where Jack Sundrud, Tom Hampton, and Rick Lonow, the surviving members of the band's final lineup, were joined by original drummer George Grantham, who guested on harmony vocals, and Michael Kelsh. It is unclear if this is considered the final performance by Poco or if that technically occurred prior to Rusty Young's death in April 2021.

== Members ==
=== Final ===
Image	Name	Years active	Instruments	Release contributions
	Norman "Rusty" Young	1968–2021 (until his death)	steel and rhythm guitars; dobro; banjo; mandolin; percussion; vocals; occasional piano	all Poco releases
	Jack Sundrud	1985–1987; 1990–1991; 2000–2021	bass; rhythm guitar; harmonica; vocals	Running Horse (2002); all Poco releases from Keeping the Legend Alive (2004) onwards
	Rick Lonow	2016–2021	drums; percussion; vocals	none
	Tom Hampton	2020–2021	lead guitar; vocals	none

=== Former ===
Image	Name	Years active	Instruments	Release contributions
	George Grantham	1968–1978; 1985–1986; 1988–1991; 2000–2004; 2013 (one-off; guest)	drums; percussion; vocals	all Poco releases from Pickin' Up the Pieces (1969) to Indian Summer (1977), and from Inamorata (1984) to Keeping the Legend Alive (2004); All Fired Up (2013) – one track only
	Richie Furay	1968–1973; 1988–1990; 2015 (one-off)	rhythm guitar; vocals	all Poco releases from Pickin' Up the Pieces (1969) to Crazy Eyes (1973); Inamorata (1984); Legacy (1989); The Last Roundup (2004) – two tracks only; Keeping the Legend Alive (2004)
	Jim Messina	1968–1970; 1988–1991	lead guitar; vocals; bass (1969)	Pickin' Up the Pieces (1969); Poco (1970); Deliverin' (1971); Seven (1974) – one track only; Legacy (1989)
	Randy Meisner	1968–1969; 1988–1991 (died 2023)	bass; vocals	Pickin' Up the Pieces (1969); Legacy (1989)
	Timothy B. Schmit	1969-1977; 2015 (one-off)	bass; percussion; harmonica; vocals	all Poco releases from Poco (1970) to Indian Summer (1977); Inamorata (1984); The Last Roundup (2004)
	Paul Cotton	1970–1987; 1991–2010; 2015 (one-off) (died 2021)	lead guitar; vocals	all Poco releases from From the Inside (1971) to The Wildwood Sessions (2006), except Legacy (1989)
	Steve Chapman	1978–1985; 1986–1987	drums; percussion	all Poco releases from Legend (1978) to Inamorata (1984)
	Charlie Harrison	1978–1984	bass; backing vocals	all Poco releases from Legend (1978) to Ghost Town (1982)
	Kim Bullard	1978–1984	keyboards; backing vocals	all Poco releases from Under the Gun (1980) to Inamorata (1984)
	Rick Seratte	1984–1985	keyboards; backing vocals	none
	Jeff Steele	1984–1985	bass; backing vocals	none
	David Vanacore	1990–1991	keyboards	none
	Gary Mallaber	1991	drums; backing vocals	none
	Tim Smith	1991–2000	drums; backing vocals	none
	Richard Neville	1991–2000	bass; backing vocals	none
	George Lawrence	2004–2016	drums; percussion	Bareback at Big Sky (2005); All Fired Up (2013)
	Michael Webb	2010–2018	keyboards; lead guitar; mandolin; bass; vocals	All Fired Up (2013)
	Lex Browning	2018–2020	lead guitar; fiddle; mandolin; backing vocals	none

== Lineups ==
Period	Members	Releases
July 1968 – April 1969	Richie Furay – lead vocals, rhythm guitar; Jim Messina – lead guitar, vocals; Rusty Young – steel guitar, mandolin, backing vocals, piano; Randy Meisner – bass, vocals; George Grantham – drums, percussion, vocals	Pickin' Up the Pieces (1969)
April – September 1969	Richie Furay – lead vocals, rhythm guitar; Jim Messina – lead guitar, bass, vocals; Rusty Young – steel guitar, mandolin, vocals; George Grantham – drums, percussion, vocals	none
September 1969 – October 1970	Richie Furay – lead vocals, rhythm guitar; Jim Messina – lead guitar, vocals; Rusty Young – steel guitar, mandolin, vocals; Timothy B. Schmit – bass, harmonica, percussion, vocals; George Grantham – drums, percussion, vocals	Poco (1970); Deliverin' (1971)
October 1970 – October 1973	Richie Furay – lead vocals, rhythm guitar; Paul Cotton – lead guitar, vocals; Rusty Young – steel guitar, mandolin, vocals; Timothy B. Schmit – bass, harmonica, percussion, vocals; George Grantham – drums, percussion, vocals	From the Inside (1971); A Good Feelin' to Know (1972); Crazy Eyes (1973)
October 1973 – September 1977	Paul Cotton – lead vocals, lead guitar; Rusty Young – steel guitar, mandolin, vocals; Timothy B. Schmit – bass, harmonica, percussion, vocals; George Grantham – drums, percussion, vocals	Seven (1974); Cantamos (1974); Head over Heels (1975); Live (1976); Rose of Cimarron (1976); Indian Summer (1977); The Last Roundup (2004)
September 1977 – January 1978 (band on hiatus)	Paul Cotton – lead vocals, lead guitar; Rusty Young – steel guitar, mandolin, vocals; George Grantham – drums, percussion, vocals	none
April – December 1978	Paul Cotton – lead vocals, lead guitar; Rusty Young – steel guitar, mandolin, vocals; Charlie Harrison – bass, backing vocals; Steve Chapman – drums, percussion	Legend (1978)
December 1978 – summer 1983	Paul Cotton – lead vocals, lead guitar; Rusty Young – steel guitar, mandolin, vocals; Charlie Harrison – bass, backing vocals; Steve Chapman – drums, percussion; Kim Bullard – keyboards, backing vocals	Under the Gun (1980); Blue and Gray (1981); Cowboys & Englishmen (1982); Ghost Town (1982)
Summer 1983 – summer 1984	Paul Cotton – lead vocals, lead guitar; Rusty Young – steel guitar, mandolin, vocals; Charlie Harrison – bass, backing vocals; Steve Chapman – drums, percussion	Inamorata (1984) (does not feature Harrison)
Summer 1984 – early 1985	Paul Cotton – lead vocals, lead guitar; Rusty Young – steel guitar, mandolin, vocals; Jeff Steele – bass, backing vocals; Steve Chapman – drums, percussion; Rick Seratte – keyboards, backing vocals	none
Early 1985 – early 1986	Paul Cotton – lead vocals, lead guitar; Rusty Young – steel guitar, mandolin, vocals; Jack Sundrud – bass, guitar, backing vocals; George Grantham – drums, percussion, backing vocals	none
Early 1986 – summer 1987	Paul Cotton – lead vocals, lead guitar; Rusty Young – steel guitar, mandolin, vocals; Jack Sundrud – bass, guitar, backing vocals; Steve Chapman – drums, percussion	none
Band on hiatus summer 1987 – late 1988
Late 1988 – January 1990	Richie Furay – lead vocals, rhythm guitar; Jim Messina – lead guitar, backing vocals; Rusty Young – steel guitar, mandolin, vocals; Randy Meisner – bass, backing vocals; George Grantham – drums, percussion, backing vocals	Legacy (1989)
January – June 1990	Richie Furay – lead vocals, rhythm guitar; Jim Messina – lead guitar, backing vocals; Rusty Young – steel guitar, mandolin, vocals; Randy Meisner – bass, backing vocals; George Grantham – drums, percussion, backing vocals; David Vanacore – keyboards	none
June 1990 – early 1991	Jim Messina – lead guitar, vocals; Jack Sundrud – rhythm guitar, vocals; Rusty Young – steel guitar, mandolin, vocals; Randy Meisner – bass, vocals; George Grantham – drums, percussion, backing vocals; David Vanacore – keyboards	none
Early – summer 1991	Jim Messina – lead guitar, vocals; Rusty Young – steel guitar, mandolin, vocals; Randy Meisner – bass, vocals	none
Summer 1991	Jim Messina – lead guitar, vocals; Rusty Young – steel guitar, mandolin, vocals; Randy Meisner – bass, vocals; Gary Mallaber – drums	none
Late 1991 – early 2000	Paul Cotton – lead vocals, lead guitar; Rusty Young – steel guitar, mandolin, vocals; Richard Neville – bass, backing vocals; Tim Smith – drums, backing vocals	none
Early 2000 – November 2004	Paul Cotton – lead vocals, lead guitar; Rusty Young – steel guitar, mandolin, vocals; Jack Sundrud – bass, guitar, vocals; George Grantham – drums, percussion, backing vocals	Running Horse (2002); Keeping the Legend Alive (2004); The Wildwood Sessions (2006) (does not feature Grantham)
November 2004 – early 2010	Paul Cotton – lead vocals, lead guitar; Rusty Young – steel guitar, mandolin, vocals; Jack Sundrud – bass, guitar, vocals; George Lawrence – drums, percussion	Bareback at Big Sky (2005)
Early 2010 – early 2016	Rusty Young – steel guitar, mandolin, vocals; Jack Sundrud – bass, guitar, vocals; Michael Webb – keyboards, guitar, vocals; George Lawrence – drums, percussion	All Fired Up (2013)
January 9, 2015 (one-off reunion; induction into Colorado Music Hall of Fame)	Rusty Young – steel guitar, mandolin, vocals; Richie Furay – lead vocals, rhythm guitar; Timothy B. Schmit – bass, harmonica, percussion, vocals; Paul Cotton – lead guitar, vocals	none
Early 2016 – October 2018	Rusty Young – steel guitar, mandolin, vocals; Jack Sundrud – bass, guitar, vocals; Michael Webb – keyboards, guitar, vocals; Rick Lonow – drums, percussion	none
October 2018 – January 2020	Rusty Young – steel guitar, mandolin, vocals; Lex Browning – mandolin, fiddle, guitar, vocals; Jack Sundrud – bass, guitar, vocals; Rick Lonow – drums, percussion	none
January 2020 – April 2021	Rusty Young – steel guitar, mandolin, vocals; Tom Hampton – lead guitar, vocals; Jack Sundrud – bass, guitar, vocals; Rick Lonow – drums, percussion	none
