= The Essential Poco =

Greatest hits album by Poco
- Released: April 19, 2005
- Genre: Country rock
- Label: Epic

Professional ratings
Review scores
| Source | Rating |
|---|---|
| Allmusic | 4/5 stars |

The Essential Poco is a compilation album of recordings by the band Poco released in 2005 as part of Sony BMG's Essential series.

== Track listing ==
1. "Pickin' Up the Pieces" (Richie Furay) – 3:20
2. "You Better Think Twice" (Jim Messina) – 3:21
3. "Anyway Bye Bye" (Furay) – 7:01
4. "C'mon [Live]" (Furay) – 3:10
5. "Kind Woman [Live]" (Furay) – 6:07
6. "Bad Weather" (Paul Cotton) – 5:02
7. "Just For Me And You" (Furay) – 3:37
8. "A Good Feelin' To Know" (Furay) – 5:15
9. "Go And Say Goodbye" (Stephen Stills) – 2:46
10. "Here We Go Again" (Timothy B. Schmit) – 3:28
11. "High and Dry" (Rusty Young) – 4:49
12. "Crazy Love" (Young) – 2:55
13. "Heart Of The Night" (Cotton) – 4:49
14. "Shoot For The Moon" (Young) – 2:48
15. "Call It Love" (Ron Gilbeau, Billy Crain, Rick Lonow) – 4:17
16. "Nothin’ To Hide" (Richard Marx, Bruce Gaitsch) – 5:12
17. "When It All Began" (Steve Pasch, M. Krizan, Richie Furay, Scott Sellen) – 3:36

== Personnel ==
- Jim Messina – guitar, vocals
- Richie Furay – guitar, 12-string guitar, vocals
- Rusty Young – steel guitar, banjo, dobro, guitar, piano, vocals
- George Grantham – drums, vocals
- Randy Meisner – bass, guitar, vocals
- Timothy B. Schmit – bass, vocals
- Paul Cotton – guitar, vocals
- Charlie Harrison – bass, vocals
- Steve Chapman – drums
- Kim Bullard – keyboards, vocals
