= The Best Of (Poco album) =

Greatest hits album by Poco
- Released: 1980
- Genre: Country rock

The Best Of is a Spanish compilation of the American band Poco, released in 1980.

== Track listing ==
1. "Bad Weather" (Paul Cotton) – 5:02
2. "Railroad Days" (Cotton) – 3:35
3. "Ride The Country" (Cotton) – 6:25
4. "A Right Along" (Cotton) – 4:43
5. "C'mon [Live]" (Richie Furay) – 3:10
6. "Pickin' Up the Pieces" (Furay) – 3:20
7. "Just For Me And You" (Furay) – 3:37
8. "Rocky Mountain Breakdown" (Rusty Young) – 2:16
9. "A Man Like Me" (Furay) – 4:04
10. "Faith In The Families" (Cotton) – 3:43

== Personnel ==
- Jim Messina - guitar, vocals
- Richie Furay - guitar, 12-string guitar, vocals
- Rusty Young - steel guitar, banjo, dobro, guitar, piano
- Randy Meisner - bass, guitar, vocals
- George Grantham - drums, vocals
- Timothy B. Schmit - bass, vocals
- Paul Cotton - guitar, vocals
