= The Ultimate Collection (Poco album) =

Greatest hits album by Poco
- Released: November 17, 1998
- Genre: Country rock
- Length: 69:36
- Label: Hip-O

Professional ratings
Review scores
Source	Rating
Allmusic	4.5/5 stars

The Ultimate Collection is a compilation album by the American band Poco, released in 1998.

== Track listing ==
1. "Pickin' Up the Pieces" (Richie Furay) – 3:20
2. "You Better Think Twice" (Jim Messina) – 3:21
3. "A Good Feelin' To Know" (Furay) – 4:06
4. "Bad Weather" (Paul Cotton) – 5:02
5. "Keep On Tryin’" (Timothy B. Schmit) – 2:54
6. "Makin’ Love" (Rusty Young) – 2:55
7. "Rose Of Cimarron" (Young) – 6:42
8. "Indian Summer" (Cotton) – 4:40
9. "Crazy Love" (Young) – 2:55
10. "Heart Of The Night" (Cotton) – 4:49
11. "Barbados" (Cotton) – 3:31
12. "Under The Gun" (Cotton) – 3:11
13. "Midnight Rain" (Cotton) – 4:25
14. "Widowmaker" (Young) – 4:25
15. "Streets Of Paradise" (Cotton) – 3:55
16. "Shoot For The Moon" (Young) – 2:48
17. "Days Gone By" (Cotton) – 3:50
18. "Call It Love" (Ron Gilbeau, Billy Crain, Rick Lonow) – 4:17

== Personnel ==
- Jim Messina – guitar, vocals
- Richie Furay – guitar, 12-string guitar, vocals
- Rusty Young – steel guitar, banjo, dobro, guitar, piano
- George Grantham – drums, vocals
- Randy Meisner – bass, guitar, vocals
- Timothy B. Schmit – bass, vocals
- Paul Cotton – guitar, vocals
- Charlie Harrison – bass, vocals
- Steve Chapman – drums
- Kim Bullard – keyboards, vocals
