= Poco: The Songs of Paul Cotton =

The Songs of Paul Cotton

Compilation album by Poco
- Released: 1979
- Genre: Country rock
- Label: Epic

Professional ratings
Review scores
Source	Rating
AllMusic	2/5 stars

Poco: The Songs of Paul Cotton is a compilation album consisting of songs by Paul Cotton of the band Poco, released in 1979.

== Track listing ==
All songs by Paul Cotton

1. "Bad Weather" – 5:02
2. "One Horse Blue" – 3:34
3. "Western Waterloo'" – 4:00
4. "Faith In The Families"– 3:43
5. "Angel" – 4:55
6. "Blue Water" – 3:07
7. "A Right Along" – 4:43
8. "Ride The Country" – 6:25
9. "Keeper Of The Fire" – 4:20
10. "Railroad Days" – 3:35

== Personnel ==
- Richie Furay - guitar, 12-string guitar, vocals
- Rusty Young - steel guitar, banjo, dobro, guitar, piano
- George Grantham - drums, vocals
- Timothy B. Schmit - bass, vocals
- Paul Cotton - guitar, vocals
