= The Very Best of Poco (1999 album) =

Greatest hits album by Poco
- Released: 1999
- Genre: Country rock

The Very Best of Poco is a 1999 compilation album of songs by the band Poco.

== Track listing ==
1. "Pickin' Up the Pieces" (Richie Furay) – 3:20
2. "My Kind Of Love" (Richie Furay) – 2:42
3. "You Better Think Twice" (Jim Messina) – 3:21
4. "Anyway Bye Bye" (Richie Furay) – 7:01
5. "C'mon [Live]" (Richie Furay) – 3:10
6. "Just In Case It Happens, Yes Indeed / Grand Junction / Consequently So Long [Live]" (Richie Furay/Rusty Young/Skip Goodwin) – 9:46
7. "Kind Woman" (Richie Furay) – 6:07
8. "Bad Weather" (Paul Cotton) – 5:02
9. "Just For Me And You" (Richie Furay) – 3:37
10. "You Are The One" (Richie Furay) – 3:48
11. "A Good Feelin' To Know" (Richie Furay) – 5:15
12. "Go And Say Goodbye" (Stephen Stills) – 2:46
13. "Faith In The Families" (Paul Cotton) – 3:43
14. "Whatever Happened To Your Smile" (Timothy B. Schmit) – 3:14

== Personnel ==
- Jim Messina - guitar, vocals
- Richie Furay - guitar, 12-string guitar, vocals
- Rusty Young - steel guitar, banjo, dobro, guitar, piano
- Randy Meisner - bass, guitar, vocals
- George Grantham - drums, vocals
- Timothy B. Schmit - bass, vocals
- Paul Cotton - guitar, vocals
