= Poco: The Songs of Richie Furay =

The Songs of Richie Furay

Compilation album by Poco
- Released: 1980
- Genre: Country rock
- Label: Epic

Professional ratings
Review scores
Source	Rating
AllMusic	3/5 stars

Poco: The Songs of Richie Furay is a compilation album consisting of songs by Richie Furay during his tenure with the band Poco, released in 1980.

== Track listing ==
All songs by Richie Furay

1. "A Good Feelin' To Know" – 5:15
2. "Hurry Up" – 4:06
3. "Don't Let It Pass By" – 2:33
4. "What If I Should Say I Love You" – 3:37
5. "Pickin' Up the Pieces" – 3:20
6. "Crazy Eyes" – 9:39
7. "And Settlin' Down" – 3:41
8. "C'mon [Live]" – 3:10
9. "What Am I Gonna Do" – 3:46

== Personnel ==
- Jim Messina - guitar, vocals
- Richie Furay - guitar, 12-string guitar, vocals
- Rusty Young - steel guitar, banjo, dobro, guitar, piano
- Randy Meisner - bass, guitar, vocals
- George Grantham - drums, vocals
- Timothy B. Schmit - bass, vocals
- Paul Cotton - guitar, vocals
