= The Essential Collection (1975–1982) =

Compilation album by Poco
- Released: June 30, 1997
- Genre: Country rock
- Label: MCA

Professional ratings
Review scores
| Source | Rating |
|---|---|
| Allmusic | 3.5/5 stars |

The Essential Collection (1975–1982) is a compilation album by the American band Poco, released in 1997.

== Track listing ==
1. "Keep On Tryin’" (Timothy B. Schmit) – 2:54
2. "Makin’ Love" (Rusty Young) – 2:55
3. "Lovin’ Arms" (Young) – 3:29
4. "Flyin’ Solo" (Timothy B. Schmit, Jacob Otis Brennan) – 3:36
5. "Rose Of Cimarron" (Young) – 6:42
6. "Too Many Nights Too Long" (Paul Cotton) – 5:59
7. "Tulsa Turnaround" (Cotton) – 2:40
8. "Stealaway" (Young) – 3:12
9. "Indian Summer" (Cotton) – 4:40
10. "Living In The Band" (Cotton) – 3:14
11. "Me And You" (Schmit) – 2:44
12. "Heart Of The Night" (Cotton) – 4:49
13. "Crazy Love" (Young) – 2:55
14. "Legend" (Young) – 4:16
15. "Midnight Rain" (Cotton) – 4:25
16. "Under The Gun" (Cotton) – 3:11
17. "Widowmaker" (Young) – 4:25
18. "Sometimes (We Are All We Got)" (Cotton) – 3:35
19. "The Price Of Love" (Don & Phil Everly) – 3:23
20. "Ashes" (Young, Johnny Logan) – 2:59
21. "Feudin’" (Young) – 2:20

== Personnel ==
- Rusty Young – steel guitar, banjo, dobro, guitar, piano
- George Grantham – drums, vocals
- Timothy B. Schmit – bass, vocals
- Paul Cotton – guitar, vocals
- Charlie Harrison – bass, vocals
- Steve Chapman – drums
- Kim Bullard – keyboards, vocals
