= Crazy Eyes =

Studio album by Poco
- Released: September 15, 1973
- Recorded: May 21–27, 1973
- Genre: Country rock
- Length: 37:49
- Label: Epic
- Producer: Jack Richardson

Poco chronology
A Good Feelin' to Know (1972)	Crazy Eyes (1973)	Seven (1974)

Professional ratings
Review scores
Source	Rating
Allmusic	4.5/5 stars
Encyclopedia of Popular Music	4/5 stars

Crazy Eyes is the fifth studio album (and sixth album overall) released by the American country rock band Poco. Released in 1973, Crazy Eyes was the band's final album with founding member Richie Furay during his original tenure in Poco.

== Overview ==
Crazy Eyes, recorded at RCA Victor Studio (Los Angeles) during May 21–27, 1973, was the second of three Poco albums produced by Jack Richardson. Richardson's first collaboration with Poco -- A Good Feelin' to Know (1972) -- had been considered the band's most viable bid for mainstream stardom to date but proved a commercial disappointment. After that failure, and while Crazy Eyes was in its planning stage, Asylum Records CEO David Geffen had offered Furay the opportunity to co-lead the Souther–Hillman–Furay Band; Furay was receptive to Geffen's offer but opted to record a final album with Poco and kept silent about his departure until the album was nearly completed. Poco included songs from the Crazy Eyes sessions in the setlist for the tour the group played during the summer of 1973, and Furay ended his original tenure as a member with the band's concert at Worcester Polytech (Mass) on September 4, 1973, eleven days before the release of Crazy Eyes. (Furay would have a second tenure with Poco in 1988–89, recording the 1989 album Legacy as a group member.)

The title track of Crazy Eyes was written by Richie Furay about Gram Parsons in 1969, when Parsons was in the Flying Burrito Brothers. According to Furay, he and Parsons "had lived across the street from each other in Greenwich Village in 1964." Furay himself gave credit for the iconic 9+-minute recording of the song to "Jack Richardson and Bob Ezrin, who did the orchestration. I just had a little folk song and the next thing I knew – wow, it was a whole production that stayed true to the original intent of the song."

If you looked in his eyes, [Parsons] was the kind of guy you could never really read.

— Richie Furay, from Desperados: the roots of country rock.

The album also features Furay's rendition of the Parsons composition "Brass Buttons", which Furay said that Parsons had originally taught him back in Greenwich Village. In fact, the song debuted on Crazy Eyes, as Parsons' own recording, on his album Grievous Angel, was not released until January 1974, four months later—and also four months after Parsons' death, as he died four days after Crazy Eyes' release.

Although Furay had been Poco's most prolific songwriter, only one other new Furay song, "Let's Dance Tonight", appeared on Crazy Eyes, perhaps because Furay was largely reserving his songwriting potential for the Souther–Hillman–Furay Band, or perhaps because so many other, unreleased songs were recorded for the album (including two other new Furay songs, "Believe Me" (which later became one of Furay's best-known songs in its recording by the Souther-Hillman-Furay Band) and "Nothin's Still The Same").

The lead single from the album -- "Here We Go Again", issued in October 1973—was the first Timothy B. Schmit composition to serve as a Poco A-side, while the B-side, the instrumental Rusty Young composition "Fools Gold", was serviced to C&W radio, with neither side becoming a hit. The second single, issued March 1974, was an edited version of Poco's cover of J. J. Cale's "Magnolia" with lead vocal by Paul Cotton; an aficionado of Southern-themed music, Cotton had become a fan of Cale's on the basis of Cale's 1972 debut album Naturally which had introduced the song "Magnolia".

"'Magnolia' is my favorite J. J. song.... We slowed down from J. J.'s version, and we
played it live in the studio, all of us at the same time.... My vocal ... was a first take."

— Paul Cotton, from Sound Waves October 2013--"'Simple and Sexy': Paul Cotton Remembers J. J. Cale" by Mark T. Gould.

Not a success as a single, Poco's "Magnolia" was evidently not performed in their live gigs concurrent with its parent album's release but from 1976 the song would become a Poco concert staple during Paul Cotton's tenure with the band. Despite the lack of even a minor hit single, the album Crazy Eyes provided Poco with a commercial boost, becoming the group's highest charting studio album up to that point in time with a peak of #38 (although the 1972 Poco live album Deliverin' had reached #26).

== Reception ==
In his Allmusic review, music critic Bruce Eder called the album "the group's liveliest and most bracing work and contains some of their most soulful music. In short, it's the fruition of everything they'd been working toward for four years... there's not a weak song, or even a wasted note anywhere on this album, and most bands would kill for a closing track as perfect as "Let's Dance Tonight.""

== Track listing ==
1. "Blue Water" (Paul Cotton) – 3:07
2. "Fools Gold" (Rusty Young) – 2:23
3. "Here We Go Again" (Timothy B. Schmit) – 3:28
4. "Brass Buttons" (Gram Parsons) – 4:17
5. "A Right Along" (Cotton) – 4:43
6. "Crazy Eyes" (the first song on side two of the original LP) (Richie Furay) – 9:39
7. "Magnolia" (J.J. Cale) – 6:18
8. "Let’s Dance Tonight" (Furay) – 3:54

== Personnel ==
- Paul Cotton – guitar, vocals
- Richie Furay – guitar, vocals
- Rusty Young – steel guitar, guitar, banjo, slide guitar
- Timothy B. Schmit – bass, vocals
- George Grantham – drums, vocals

with:

- Chris Hillman – mandolin
- Bob Ezrin – piano
- Bill Graham – violin
- Paul Harris – piano
- Joe Lala – percussion

== Production ==
- Producer: Jack Richardson
- Recording Engineer: Brian Christian/Dennis Smith
