= The Very Best of Poco =

The Very Best of Poco may refer to:

- The Very Best of Poco (1975 album)
- The Very Best of Poco (1999 album)
