= Backtracks (Poco album) =

Compilation album by Poco
- Released: 1982
- Genre: Country rock
- Label: MCA-5363

Professional ratings
Review scores
| Source | Rating |
|---|---|
| Allmusic | Allmusic link |

Backtracks is a compilation album by the American country rock band Poco, released in 1982. The nine tracks are taken from the first six studio albums the band recorded for MCA after having left their original label Epic.

== Track listing ==
1. "Heart Of The Night" (Cotton) – 4:49
2. "Keep On Tryin’" (Timothy B. Schmit) – 2:54
3. "Midnight Rain" (Cotton) – 4:25
4. "Widowmaker" (Young) – 4:25
5. "Crazy Love" (Young) – 2:55
6. "Legend" (Young) – 4:16
7. "Indian Summer" (Paul Cotton) – 4:40
8. "Under The Gun" (Cotton) – 3:11
9. "Rose Of Cimarron" (Rusty Young) – 6:42

== Personnel ==
- Rusty Young – steel guitar, banjo, dobro, guitar, piano
- George Grantham – drums, vocals
- Timothy B. Schmit – bass, vocals
- Paul Cotton – guitar, vocals
- Charlie Harrison – bass, vocals
- Steve Chapman – drums
- Kim Bullard – keyboards, vocals
