= Seven (Poco album) =

Studio album by Poco
- Released: April 12, 1974
- Recorded: February 1974
- Genre: Country rock
- Length: 35:45
- Label: Epic
- Producer: Jack Richardson

Poco chronology
Crazy Eyes (1973)	Seven (1974)	Cantamos (1974)

Seven is the sixth studio album (seventh overall) by American country rock band Poco. It is the first album they made after leader Richie Furay left the band. The front cover was designed by Phil Hartman. On this album the group experimented with a harder rock sound on some of the tracks.

== Release history ==
In addition to the conventional 2-channel stereo version the album was also released in a 4- channel quadraphonic edition on LP and on 8-track tape in 1974. The quad LP release was encoded with the SQ matrix system.

The album was reissued in the UK on the Super Audio CD format in 2018 by Dutton Vocalion. This edition is a 2-albums-on-1-disc compilation which also contains the followup 1974 Poco album Cantamos. The Dutton Vocalion release contains the complete stereo and quad mixes of both albums.

== Reception ==
Professional ratings
Review scores
Source	Rating
Allmusic	3/5 stars
Encyclopedia of Popular Music	3/5 stars

In his Allmusic review, music critic Bruce Eder wrote of the album "With strong, soaring harmonies, a healthy balance between acoustic country-rock and heavy rock & roll, and some fairly strong songs, Seven is a major surprise, given that this is the group's first post-Richie Furay album... with one or two additional strong songs, this would be a highly recommended album, and as it is, it's quite good. Unfortunately, not everything here is as strong as "Drivin' Wheel" or "Rocky Mountain Breakdown.""

== Track listing ==
1. "Drivin' Wheel" (Paul Cotton) – 6:10
2. "Rocky Mountain Breakdown" (Rusty Young) – 2:16
3. "Just Call My Name" (Timothy B. Schmit, Noreen Schmit) – 5:12
4. "Skatin'" (T. Schmit) – 4:42
5. "Faith in the Families" (Cotton) – 3:43
6. "Krikkit's Song (Passing Through)" (T. Schmit) – 3:33
7. "Angel" (Cotton) – 4:55
8. "You've Got Your Reasons" (Cotton) – 5:14

== Personnel ==
- Paul Cotton – vocals, lead and acoustic guitars
- Rusty Young – pedal steel guitar, banjo, Dobro, rhythm, acoustic and electric guitars
- Timothy B. Schmit – vocals, bass guitar
- George Grantham – vocals, drums, percussion

With:

- Jim Messina – mandolin on "Rocky Mountain Breakdown"
- Burton Cummings – keyboards
- Bobbye Hall – congas
- Al Garth – fiddle on "Rocky Mountain Breakdown"
