= The Very Best of Poco (1975 album) =

Greatest hits album by Poco
- Released: May 1975
- Genre: Country rock
- Producer: Steve Cropper, Jim Messina, Jack Richardson

Poco chronology
| Head over Heels (1975) | The Very Best of Poco (1975) | Live (1976) |

Professional ratings
Review scores
| Source | Rating |
|---|---|
| Allmusic | 4.5/5 stars |
| Encyclopedia of Popular Music | 4/5 stars |

The first in a long line of compilation albums, The Very Best of Poco features highlights from the career of the band Poco from 1969–1974. When released on CD in the late 1980s, the album omits two tracks originally on the album, "Railroad Days" and "Skatin" for space reasons. Both were reinstated for the remastered BGO import edition released in 1998.

== Track listing ==
1. "You Better Think Twice" (Jim Messina) – 3:21 (taken from Poco)
2. "Just for Me and You" (Richie Furay) – 3:37 (taken from From the Inside)
3. "Bad Weather" (Paul Cotton) – 5:02 (taken from From The Inside)
4. "Fools Gold" (Rusty Young) – 2:23 (taken from Crazy Eyes)
5. "A Good Feelin' to Know" (Richie Furay) – 3:56 (taken from A Good Feelin' to Know)
6. "Another Time Around" (Paul Cotton) – 5:01 (taken from Cantamos)
7. "Faith in the Families" (Paul Cotton) – 3:43 (taken from Seven)
8. "Just in Case It Happens, Yes Indeed / Grand Junction / Consequently So Long" [Live] (Richie Furay, Rusty Young, Skip Goodwin) – 10:10 (taken from Deliverin')
9. "Railroad Days" (Paul Cotton) – 3:37 (taken from From the Inside)*
10. "Sweet Lovin'" (Richie Furay) – 6:23 (taken from A Good Feelin' to Know)
11. "Rocky Mountain Breakdown" (Rusty Young) – 2:16 (taken from Seven)
12. "Here We Go Again" (Timothy B. Schmit) – 3:28 (taken from Crazy Eyes)
13. "C'mon" [Live] (Richie Furay) – 3:17 (taken from Deliverin)
14. "A Right Along" (Paul Cotton) – 4:43 (taken from Crazy Eyes)
15. "A Man Like Me" [Live] (Richie Furay) – 4:04 (taken from Deliverin')
16. "And Settlin' Down" (Richie Furay) – 3:41 (taken from A Good Feelin' to Know)
17. "Skatin" (Timothy B. Schmit) – 4:44 (taken from Seven)*
18. "Pickin' Up the Pieces" (Richie Furay) – 3:20 (taken from Poco's debut Pickin' Up the Pieces)

*Omitted from original Sony CD version but reinstated on BGO CD remaster.

== Personnel ==
- Jim Messina - guitar, vocals
- Richie Furay - guitar, 12-string guitar, vocals
- Rusty Young - steel guitar, banjo, dobro, guitar, piano
- Randy Meisner - bass, guitar, vocals
- George Grantham - drums, vocals
- Timothy B. Schmit - bass, vocals
- Paul Cotton - guitar, vocals

== Chart positions ==
| Year | Chart | Position |
|---|---|---|
| 1975 | The Billboard 200 | 90 |
