= Keeping the Legend Alive =

Live album by Poco
- Released: 23 November 2004
- Recorded: May 2004
- Genre: Country rock
- Length: 77:56
- Label: Madacy
- Producer: Stephen Singer

Poco chronology
The Last Roundup (2004)	Keeping the Legend Alive (2004)	Bareback at Big Sky (2005)

Keeping the Legend Alive is the 22nd album and 4th live album by the country rock band Poco. It was re-released in 2006 under the title "Alive In The Heart Of The Night." It includes original members Richie Furay, *George Grantham and Rusty Young, Paul Cotton who replaced Jim Messina in 1970 and Jack Sundrud a member since the 1990s (See concert poster at ).

In most packages it included a 90 minutes DVD and a Bonus DVD that included live backstage footage, interviews, sound check photos and more. Rusty Young sings lead on "Where Did The Time Go", Timothy B. Schmit's Keeping on Tryin'; "Crazy Love", "Call It Love" and "Spellbound"; Paul Cotton sings lead on "Bad Weather", "Magnolia", "Indian Summer", "Ride The Country" and "Heart Of The Night"; Rusty Young and Paul Cotton share the lead vocals on "Rose Of Cimmaron"; and Richie Furay sings lead on "Pickin' Up The Pieces", "Let's Dance, "Jim Messina's "You Better Think Twice" (as he used to do in the band's early days when Jim Messina concentrated on his playing at the early live shows.), "Kind Woman" and A Good Feelin' To Know".

The recording of a highly anticipated show at Nashville's Belcourt Theatre on May 20, 2004 was attended by Poco fans from throughout the country. Richie Furay performs occasionally with Poco See the "Deliverin' Poco concert data base at ).

Some of the more celebrated performances included three shows in the northeast in the summer 2009 with Loggins and Messina which also included Messina joining the band for his "You Better Think Twice" and an April 26, 2009 performance at the Stagecoach Festival in California which also included Timothy B. Schmit, Grantham and Messina, preceded by tuneup performances (sans Grantham) April 23 at Clark Center, Arroyo Grande, CA. and April 24 at Great American Music Hall, San Francisco, CA and a live rehearsal April 22, 2009 at the Maverick in Santa Ynez, CA. (See the "Deliverin' Poco concert data base at )

== Track listing ==
1. "Where Did The Time Go" (Rusty Young) – 1:15
2. "Keep On Tryin’" (Timothy B. Schmit) – 2:24
3. "Crazy Love" (Rusty Young) – 4:05
4. "Pickin’ Up The Pieces" (Richie Furay) – 3:33
5. "Bad Weather" (Paul Cotton) – 5:21
6. "Call It Love" (Billy Crain, Ronnie Guilbeau, Rick Lonow) – 5:01
7. "Let’s Dance" (Richie Furay) – 4:41
8. "Magnolia" (J.J. Cale) – 7:23
9. "You’d Better Think Twice" (Jim Messina) – 3:34
10. "Spellbound" (Rusty Young) – 6:21
11. "Indian Summer" (Paul Cotton) – 5:26
12. "Kind Woman" (Richie Furay) – 5:00
13. "Rose Of Cimarron" (Rusty Young) – 6:17
14. "Ride The Country" (Paul Cotton) – 6:02
15. "A Good Feelin’ To Know" (Richie Furay) – 4:36
16. "Heart Of The Night" (Paul Cotton) – 6:57

== Personnel ==
- Paul Cotton – guitar, vocals
- Rusty Young – steel guitar, banjo, dobro, guitar, vocals
- George Grantham – drums, vocals
- Jack Sundrud – bass, vocals
- Richie Furay – guitar, vocals
- Tony Harrell – keyboards, accordion (on Bad Weather)
- Phil Kenzie – saxophone

== Production ==
- Producer: Stephen Singer
