= Running Horse =

Studio album by Poco
- Released: 18 November 2002
- Genre: Country rock
- Length: 45:04
- Label: Drifter's Church
- Producer: Mike Clute, Rusty Young

Poco chronology
Legacy (1989)	Running Horse (2002)	The Last Roundup (2004)

Running Horse is the eighteenth studio album by the country rock band Poco. Rusty Young, Paul Cotton, and George Grantham reunite for the first time since 1977 with new material.

== Reception ==
Professional ratings
Review scores
Source	Rating
Allmusic	1.5/5 stars
Encyclopedia of Popular Music	3/5 stars

In his Allmusic review, music critic John Duffy called the production "weak, tentative, and thin, with dated guitar tones and studio feel" and wrote, "It's as if the alt-country explosion of the mid-'90s never happened. With so many groups owing a debt to Poco, it's hard to understand why while listening to Running Horse. All that said, Young and guitarist Paul Cotton's songs display charming honesty and rich emotional depth, more so than most any mainstream country release could muster."

== Track listing ==
1. “One Tear at a Time” (Rusty Young) – 3:02
2. “Every Time I Hear That Train” (Paul Cotton) – 4:28
3. “If Your Heart Needs a Hand” (Young) – 4:59
4. “Never Loved... Never Hurt Like This” (Jack Sundrud) – 3:47
5. “Forever” (Young) – 3:31
6. “Never Get Enough” (Sundrud, Craig Bickhardt, David James) – 3:07
7. “If You Can’t Stand to Lose” (Young, John Cowan) – 4:15
8. “I Can Only Imagine” (Cotton) – 5:09
9. “Shake It” (Sundrud) – 4:54
10. “That’s What Love is all About” (Young, Craig Fuller) – 3:45
11. “Running Horse” (Cotton) – 4:07

== Personnel ==
Poco

- Paul Cotton – electric lead guitar, acoustic rhythm guitar, lead vocals, backing vocals
- Rusty Young – lap steel guitar, banjo, dobro, pedal steel guitar electric rhythm guitar, acoustic rhythm guitar, lead vocals, backing vocals
- Jack Sundrud – bass, lead vocals, backing vocals
- George Grantham – drums, percussion, backing vocals

Additional musicians

- Tony Harrell – keyboards
- Craig Fuller – acoustic guitar (3), harmony vocals (3), backing vocals (10)
- Bill Lloyd – additional guitar (5, 8)
- John Cowan – backing vocals (7)

== Production ==
- Mike Clute – producer, engineer, mixing
- Rusty Young – producer
- Jack Sundrud – engineer, collage design
- Pete Misines – assistant engineer
- Eric Walker – design, layout
- Georgina Rosenbaum – cover artwork
- Jonathan Rosenbaum – cover artwork
- Mary Frances Brennan – photography
- Recorded at Mike's Place and Jack's Place (Nashville, Tennessee).
- Mixed at Mike's Place
