= Backtrack =

Backtrack may refer to:

== Arts, entertainment, and media ==
=== Films ===
- Backtrack!, a 1969 Western film starring Doug McClure
- Backtrack, alternate title for Catchfire, a 1990 drama film starring Jodie Foster
- Backtrack (film), a 2015 film

=== Music ===
- Backtrack (band), an American hardcore band
- Backtracks (AC/DC album), an album by AC/DC
- Backtracks (Poco album), an album by Poco
- "Backtrack" (song), the fourth single from singer Rebecca Ferguson's debut album, Heaven

=== Other uses in arts, entertainment, and media ===
- Back Track, a 1998 first-person shooter for the Game Boy Advance
- BackTrack (magazine), a British railway history monthly magazine
- Backtrack (novel), a 1965 western novel written by Milton Lott
- "Backtrack" (The Professionals), a 1979 episode of the television series

== Computing and technology ==
- BackTrack, a Linux distribution
- Backtracking, a search algorithm in computing
- Backtaxi, an aircraft procedure
