= From the Inside (Poco album) =

Studio album by Poco
- Released: September 5, 1971
- Recorded: May 1971
- Studio: Trans Maximus Inc. Recording Studios, Memphis, Tennessee; Columbia Studios, San Francisco, California
- Genre: Country rock
- Length: 37:49
- Label: Epic
- Producer: Steve Cropper

Poco chronology
Deliverin' (1971)	From the Inside (1971)	A Good Feelin' to Know (1972)

From the Inside is the third studio album by the American country rock band Poco. The band was reportedly unhappy with it following its release. This album was the first to include new member Paul Cotton as lead guitarist, who replaced Jim Messina. Messina would go on to form his partnership with Kenny Loggins.

== Reception ==
Professional ratings
Review scores
Source	Rating
Allmusic	3.5/5 stars
Encyclopedia of Popular Music	4/5 stars

In his Allmusic review, music critic Bruce Eder called the album "Poco's most unusual record... featuring the group generating a leaner, more stripped-down, somewhat bluesier sound. The harmonies are less radiant and the guitars more subdued, and the spirits also a little more low-key than usual. But the sound they get is still appealing, the singing more reflective."

== Track listing ==
1. "Hoe Down" (Richie Furay, Rusty Young) – 2:04
2. "Bad Weather" (Paul Cotton) – 5:02
3. "What Am I Gonna Do" (Furay) – 3:46
4. "You Are the One" (Furay) – 3:48
5. "Railroad Days" (Cotton) – 3:35
6. "From the Inside" (Timothy B. Schmit) – 3:10
7. "Do You Feel It Too" (Furay) – 5:32
8. "Ol’ Forgiver" (Cotton) – 3:38
9. "What If I Should Say I Love You" (Furay) – 3:37
10. "Just for Me and You" (Furay) – 3:37

== 2013 Iconoclassic edition bonus tracks ==
11. "C'mon" (studio version) (Furay) – 2:52
12. "A Man Like Me" (studio version) (Furay) – 3:36

== Personnel ==
Poco

- Richie Furay – rhythm electric and acoustic guitars, vocals
- Paul Cotton – lead electric and acoustic guitars, vocals
- Rusty Young – pedal steel guitar, banjo, mandolin, dobro, vocals
- Timothy B. Schmit – bass guitar, vocals
- George Grantham – drums, vocals

with:

- Jay Spell – piano

== Production ==
- Steve Cropper – producer
- Charlie Bragg, Lacy O'Neal, Roy Segal – recording engineer
- Kathy Johnson – front cover assemblage
