= Cantamos =

Studio album by Poco
- Released: November 1, 1974
- Recorded: August–September 1974
- Genre: Country rock
- Length: 36:39
- Label: Epic
- Producer: Poco

Poco chronology
| Seven (1974) | Cantamos (1974) | Head Over Heels (1975) |

Cantamos is the seventh studio album by the country rock band Poco. It was released in 1974 on Epic Records. This album saw the band moving back towards their traditional country rock sound after experimenting with a harder style on the previous album.

== Release history ==
In addition to the conventional 2 channel stereo version the album was also released in a 4 channel quadraphonic edition on LP on 8-track tape in 1974. The quad LP release was encoded with the SQ matrix system.

The album was reissued in the UK on the Super Audio CD format in 2018 by Dutton Vocalion. This edition is a 2 albums on 1 disc compilation which also contains the 1974 Poco album Seven. The Dutton Vocalion release contains the complete stereo and quad mixes of both albums.

== Reception ==
Professional ratings
Review scores
| Source | Rating |
|---|---|
| Allmusic | 3/5 stars |
| Encyclopedia of Popular Music | 2/5 stars |

In his Allmusic review, music critic James Chrispell wrote of the album "Much of the magic of their earlier albums has been recaptured."

== Track listing ==
1. "Sagebrush Serenade" (Rusty Young) – 4:58
2. "Susannah" (Paul Cotton) – 4:13
3. "High and Dry" (Young) – 4:49
4. "Western Waterloo'" (Cotton) – 4:00
5. "One Horse Blue" (Cotton) – 3:34
6. "Bitter Blue" (Timothy B. Schmit) – 3:20
7. "Another Time Around" (Cotton) – 5:01
8. "Whatever Happened to Your Smile" (Schmit) – 3:14
9. "All The Ways" (Young) – 3:28

== Personnel ==
- Paul Cotton – guitars, vocals
- Rusty Young – steel guitar, banjo, guitars, vocals
- Timothy B. Schmit – bass, vocals
- George Grantham – drums, vocals

== Production ==
- Poco – producers
- Mark Henry Harman – engineer
- Michael Verdick – assistant engineer
- Wally Traugott – mastering
- Phil Hartman – cover design, illustration
- Gribbitt! – creative direction
- Hartmann and Goodman – management

Studios

- Recorded and Mixed at Record Plant (Los Angeles, California).
- Mastered at Capitol Studios (Hollywood, California).
