= I've Got a Reason =

Studio album by Richie Furay
- Released: 1976
- Genre: Pop, rock, country rock
- Label: Asylum
- Producer: Michael Omartian, Bill Schnee

Richie Furay chronology
I've Got a Reason (1976)	Dance a Little Light (1978)

I've Got a Reason is the debut solo album by American singer-songwriter Richie Furay, released in 1976.

== History ==
After leaving Poco in 1974 and the country rock supergroup Souther-Hillman-Furay Band, Furay released his first solo album which reflected Furay's newfound Christian beliefs. He formed The Richie Furay Band with Jay Truax, John Mehler, and Tom Stipe. To support the release of this album Furay formed an alliance with David Geffen and Asylum Records. Furay assured Geffen that his album would be Christian influenced but would not be an attempt to preach his newfound beliefs. After two tours and two more releases on the Asylum label during the late 1970s, he left the music business and became a minister.

== Reception ==
Professional ratings
Review scores
Source	Rating
AllMusic	4.5/5 stars

In his review for AllMusic, Brett Hartenbach praised the album, writing that it "expands on Furay's newfound faith, although without the usual ham-fisted rhetoric of a recent convert. The songs here are more about looking inward than they are about proselytizing. Musically, Furay continues his gradual move away from the country-rock leanings of his past, moving closer to a somewhat slicker, more pop-oriented rock sound." Hartenbach criticized the production of Michael Omartian, calling it often intrusive: "...some otherwise decent songs such as "Mighty Maker" and "Over and Over" suffer, sounding rather silly beneath his heavy-handed strings and bloated synths." He summarizes the album as "a strong personal statement."

== Reissues ==
- I've Got a Reason was reissued on Myrrh Records in 1981.
- I've Got a Reason was reissued on CD by the Wounded Bird label in 2003.

== Track listing ==
All songs by Richie Furay unless otherwise noted

1. "Look at the Sun" (Richie Furay, Tom Stipe) – 5:07
2. "We'll See" – 3:02
3. "Starlight" (Furay, Stipe) – 3:40
4. "Gettin' Through" (Furay, Stipe) – 2:59
5. "I've Got a Reason" – 4:07
6. "Mighty Maker" – 3:54
7. "You're the One I Love" – 3:41
8. "Still Rolling Stones" – 3:55
9. "Over and Over Again" (Furay, Stipe) – 7:08

== Personnel ==
- Richie Furay - vocals, guitar
- John Mehler - drums
- Alex McDougall - percussion
- Tom Stipe - keyboards
- Steve Cropper, Al Perkins - guitar
- Don Gerber - banjo
- Michael Omartian - keyboards, percussion, background vocals
- Stormie Omartian - background vocals
- Jay Truax - bass, background vocals
- Myrna Matthews - background vocals
- Ann White - background vocals
- Carolyn Willis - background vocals

Production notes

- Michael Omartian - producer
- Bill Schnee - producer

== Chart positions ==
Year	Chart	Position
1976	Billboard Pop albums	130
