= Under the Gun (Poco album) =

Studio album by Poco
- Released: July 1980
- Genre: Country rock
- Length: 38:31
- Label: MCA
- Producer: Mike Flicker

Poco chronology
Legend (1978)	Under the Gun (1980)	Blue and Gray (1981)

Under the Gun is the twelfth studio album by the American country rock band Poco. Released in July 1980, Under the Gun was the follow-up to Poco's breakout album Legend.

== Background ==
Poco's successful album, Legend, had been released in November 1978 on ABC Records just prior to that label being bought out by MCA: in a June 7, 2013, interview with Rockin' Rich Lynch of SoundPress.net Radio Network, veteran Poco member Paul Cotton would state that MCA required that Poco audition prior to being allowed to record for MCA. Cotton said, "We had to go over to a rehearsal hall and play in front of all the executives" who after hearing Poco perform "Under the Gun", a Paul Cotton composition referencing the pressure attendant on the audition, approved Poco's recording for MCA.

Released at the same time as the album, the "Under the Gun" single failed to reach the Top 40 stalling at No. 48 on the Billboard Hot 100: another Paul Cotton composition "Midnight Rain" also failed to chart high in its single release with a No. 74 peak. Without the impetus of a major hit single the Under the Gun album failed to match the success of Legend, the former's album chart peak being No. 46.

== Reception ==
Professional ratings
Review scores
Source	Rating
AllMusic	2/5 stars
The Encyclopedia of Popular Music	2/5 stars

In his AllMusic review, music critic William Ruhlmann called the album "a workmanlike but unremarkable effort."

== Track listing ==
1. "Under the Gun" (Paul Cotton) – 3:11
2. "While We're Still Young" (Rusty Young) – 3:52
3. "The Everlasting Kind" (Young) – 4:22
4. "Down to the Wire" (Cotton) – 2:55
5. "Footsteps of a Fool (Shaky Ground)" (Young) – 3:57
6. "Reputation" (Young) – 4:51
7. "Midnight Rain" (Cotton) – 4:25
8. "A Fool's Paradise" (Young) – 3:18
9. "Friends in the Distance" (Cotton) – 3:40
10. "Made of Stone" (Young) – 4:00

== Charts ==
Chart (1980)	Position
Australia (Kent Music Report)	68
Canada	38
United States (Billboard 200)	46

== Personnel ==
Poco

- Paul Cotton – electric guitars, lead vocals (1, 2, 4, 7, 9), backing vocals (3, 5, 6, 8)
- Rusty Young – electric guitars (1, 2, 4–10), backing vocals (2, 7, 10), 12-string acoustic guitar (3), lead vocals (3, 5, 6, 8, 10), dobro (5), steel guitar (5), pedal steel guitar (7)
- Kim Bullard – keyboards, backing vocals (3, 5, 10)
- Charlie Harrison – bass, backing vocals (1–7, 10)
- Steve Chapman – drums

Additional musicians

- Steve Forman – percussion (2, 5, 6, 9)
- Phil Kenzie – alto saxophone (5)

== Production ==
- Mike Flicker – producer
- Dennis Jones – production assistant
- Joe Chiccarelli – engineer, mixing
- Barbara Issak – assistant engineer
- John Golden – mastering
- Rod Dyer – cover design
- Andy Engel – cover design
- George Osaki – cover design
- Gary Heery – photography
- Recorded and Mixed at The Village Recorder (Los Angeles, California).
- Mastered at Kendun Recorders (Burbank, California).
