= The Wildwood Sessions =

Live album by Poco
- Released: 6 December 2006
- Recorded: October 2003
- Venue: The Wildwood Lodge, Steelville, MO
- Genre: Country rock
- Length: 41:29
- Label: Drifter's Church

Poco chronology
Bareback At Big Sky (2005)	The Wildwood Sessions (2006)	All Fired Up (2014)

The Wildwood Sessions is the sixth live album by the country rock band Poco. The album was recorded live at The Wildwood Lodge in Steelville, MO.

== Track listing ==
1. "Grand Junction" (Rusty Young) – 2:11
2. "Cajun Moon" (J.J. Cale) – 5:54
3. "Save A Corner Of Your Heart For Me" (Rusty Young) – 4:15
4. " If Your Heart Needs A Hand" (Rusty Young) – 4:36
5. "Cain’s Blood" (Michael Johnson) – 3:52
6. "Magnolia" (JJ Cale) – 5:21
7. "Father's Day" (Craig Bickhardt, Helen Darling) – 3:27
8. "For The Love Of Mary" (Rusty Young) – 3:55
9. "Do What You Do" (Paul Cotton, Ron Marzilli) – 3:55
10. "On The Way Home" (Neil Young) – 4:03

== Personnel ==
- Paul Cotton - guitar, vocals
- Rusty Young - steel guitar, banjo, dobro, guitar, vocals
- Jack Sundrud - bass, vocals
