= Poco (album) =

Studio album by Poco
- Released: May 6, 1970
- Genre: Country rock
- Length: 41:00
- Label: Epic
- Producer: Jim Messina

Poco chronology
Pickin' Up the Pieces (1969)	Poco (1970)	Deliverin' (1971)

Singles from Poco
- 1. "You Better Think Twice" Released: 1970

Poco is the second album by American country rock band Poco. This is the band's first album to feature bassist Timothy B. Schmit, who had replaced Randy Meisner. The Messina-penned "You Better Think Twice" became a signature song for the band. A copy of this album hangs in the Poco exhibit in the Country Music Hall of Fame in Nashville along with the jacket Rusty Young wears on the back cover. The album was dedicated to David Geffen who "picked up the pieces".

== Reception ==
Professional ratings
Review scores
Source	Rating
AllMusic	4/5 stars
Christgau's Record Guide	C+
The Encyclopedia of Popular Music	3/5 stars

In his AllMusic review, music critic Bruce Eder wrote, "These songs represent the group's blend of country and rock at its finest and brightest, with the happy harmonies of "Hurry Up" and "Keep on Believin'" totally irresistible... The knock was "too country for rock, too rock for country," but in fact, they were just ahead of their time, a tough spot to be in the world of popular entertainment." In his review, Robert Christgau wrote in 1981, "The most overrated underrated group in America. All of CSNY's preciosity with none of the inspiration, all of bluegrass's ramifications with none of its roots. In short, the perfect commentary on the vacuity of competence."

== Track listing ==
No.	Title	Writer(s)	Length
1.	"Hurry Up"	Richie Furay	4:06
2.	"You Better Think Twice"	Jim Messina	3:21
3.	"Honky Tonk Downstairs"	Dallas Frazier	2:43
4.	"Keep on Believin'"	Furay, Timothy B. Schmit	2:51
5.	"Anyway Bye Bye"	Furay	7:01
6.	"Don't Let It Pass By"	Furay	2:33
7.	"Nobody's Fool/El Tonto de Nadie, Regresa"	Furay, Messina, Schmit, Rusty Young, George Grantham	18:25

== Charts ==
Chart (1970/71)	Position
Australia (Kent Music Report)	34
Canada	15
United States (Billboard 200)	58

== Personnel ==
Poco

- Jim Messina – guitar, vocals
- Richie Furay – guitar, vocals
- Rusty Young – steel guitar, guitar, Dobro, vocals
- Timothy B. Schmit – bass guitar, vocals
- George Grantham – drums, vocals

With:

- Bobby Doyle – piano
- Larry Knechtel – piano
- Milt Holland – percussion

Production

- Jim Messina – producer
- Terry Dunavan, Alex Kazanegras – engineer
- Gary Burden – art direction, design
- Henry Diltz – photography
- Morris Ovsey – cover drawing
