= Head over Heels (Poco album) =

Head Over Heels

Studio album by Poco
- Released: July 1975
- Genre: Country rock
- Length: 36:26
- Label: ABC
- Producer: Poco, Mark Henry Harman

Poco chronology
Cantamos (1974)	Head Over Heels (1975)	The Very Best of Poco (1975)

Head Over Heels is the eighth studio album by the American country rock band Poco, and their first on ABC Records. Timothy B. Schmit's "Keep On Tryin'" shows off the band's skills in harmonizing and became a favorite that the band played in concert for many years. It also contains Rusty Young performing his first lead vocal on a Poco album on the track "Us", and a recording of the Steely Dan song "Dallas".

== Reception ==
Professional ratings
Review scores
Source	Rating
Allmusic	4/5 stars
Encyclopedia of Popular Music	4/5 stars

In his Allmusic review, music critic James Chrispell wrote; "Keeping the songs short and to the point, Poco lets loose with a fine batch of material... There's less country, but a lot more pop."

== Track listing ==
1. "Keep on Tryin’" (Timothy B. Schmit) – 2:54
2. "Lovin’ Arms" (Rusty Young) – 3:29
3. "Let Me Turn Back to You" (Paul Cotton) – 3:37
4. "Makin’ Love" (Young) – 2:55
5. "Down in the Quarter" (Cotton) – 4:32
6. "Sittin’ on a Fence" (Young) – 3:31
7. "Georgia, Bind My Ties" (Cotton) – 3:25
8. "Us" (Young) – 1:56
9. "Flyin’ Solo" (Schmit, John Brennan) – 3:36
10. "Dallas" (Donald Fagen, Walter Becker) – 3:29
11. "I’ll Be Back Again" (Schmit) – 3:02

== Personnel ==
Poco

- Paul Cotton – acoustic guitar (1–3, 6–10), vocals (1–7, 9–11), electric guitar (3–11)
- Rusty Young – acoustic guitar (2–4, 6), banjo (2), dobro (2), pedal steel guitar (2–7, 10–11), mandolin (3, 8), steel guitar (4, 6), electric guitar (6), vocals (8)
- Timothy B. Schmit – vocals (1–11), bass (2–11), percussion (6, 8)
- George Grantham – vocals (1–7, 9–11), drums (2–11), percussion (2, 4, 6)

Additional musicians

- Mark Henry Harman – pipe organ (3, 8), acoustic piano (8)
- Garth Hudson – acoustic piano (4)
- Victor Feldman – percussion (6, 10–11)
- Al Garth – viola (2), violin (2), laugh (2)
- Jimmie Haskell – string arrangements (5, 10)
- Michael "Von" Verdick – scat vocal (6)

== Production ==
- Poco – producers, arrangements
- Mark Henry Harman – producer, engineer
- Michael "Von" Verdick – engineer
- Wally Traugott – mastering
- Llew Llewellyn – equipment
- Peter Whorf – art direction
- Tim Bryant – design
- Phil Hartman – design
- Ron Slenzak – photography
- Hartmann and Goodman – management

Studios

- Recorded at Record Plant (Los Angeles, California).
- Mixed at ABC Recording Studios (Los Angeles, California).
- Mastered at Capitol Mastering (Hollywood, California).
