= Bareback at Big Sky =

Live album by Poco
- Released: 20 September 2005
- Recorded: 20 & 21 April 2005 at Big Sky High Studio, Bozeman, Montana, United States
- Genre: Country rock
- Length: 72:35
- Label: Drifter's Church
- Producer: Rusty Young, David Goodwin

Poco chronology
Keeping the Legend Alive (2004)	Bareback at Big Sky (2005)	The Wildwood Sessions (2006)

Bareback at Big Sky is the fifth live album by the country rock band Poco, released in 2005.

== Reception ==
Professional ratings
Review scores
Source	Rating
Allmusic	3.5/5 stars
Encyclopedia of Popular Music	3/5 stars

In his Allmusic review, music critic Hal Horowitz wrote, "The atmosphere is not surprisingly homey and loose, with terrific harmonies from Paul Cotton and Rusty Young, the only two Poco originals left. It's a rather odd combination of almost hits, generally from the Legend era, along with some new material and a few from the band's previous indie release, Running Horse... It's all pleasant, comfy, and predictable with too few moments, such as an unexpectedly rowdy cover of J.J. Cale's "Cajun Moon," where sparks fly. But the sound is crisp, the band sounds inspired, and for old fans there are enough glimpses of Poco's characteristic country/folk-rock to make this a worthwhile purchase."

== Track listing ==
1. "Under The Gun" (Paul Cotton) – 4:29
2. "Nothing Less Than Love " (Rusty Young, Wayne Tester) – 4:17
3. "Every Time I Hear That Train" (Cotton) – 5:03
4. "Save A Corner Of Your Heart For Me" (Young) – 3:47
5. "Barbados" (Cotton) – 4:35
6. "If Your Heart Needs A Hand" (Young) – 5:26
7. "Cajun Moon" (J.J. Cale) – 6:59
8. "Never Loved...Never Hurt Like This" (Jack Sundrud) – 4:01
9. "Midnight Rain" (Cotton) – 4:38
10. "What Do People Know" (Young) – 3:58
11. "Shake It" (Sundrud) – 4:47
12. "Find Out In Time" (Timothy B. Schmit) – 3:18
13. "Too Many Nights Too Long" (Cotton) – 5:40
14. "Bareback" (Cotton) – 5:52
15. "On The Way Home" (Neil Young) – 5:45

== Personnel ==
- Paul Cotton – guitar, vocals
- Rusty Young – steel guitar, banjo, dobro, guitar, vocals
- Jack Sundrud – bass, vocals
- George Lawrence – drums
- David Goodwin – harmonica

== Production ==
- Producer: Rusty Young, David Goodwin
- Recording Engineer: Aaron Swihart
