= All Fired Up (Poco album) =

Studio album by Poco
- Released: March 5, 2013
- Genre: Country rock
- Length: 53:28
- Label: Drifter's Church

Poco chronology
The Wildwood Sessions (2006)	All Fired Up (2013)	Crazy Love (2014)

All Fired Up is the nineteenth and final studio album by American band Poco, released in 2013.

== Reception ==
Professional ratings
Aggregate scores
Source	Rating
Metacritic	53/100
Review scores
Source	Rating
Allmusic	3/5 stars
Encyclopedia of Popular Music	3/5 stars

In his Allmusic review, music critic Steve Leggett wrote, "While this set, the group's first new album since 2003's Running Horse, has some bright, Poco-like moments with songs like "All Fired Up," "When She's Mine," and "Love Has No Reason," it's really a case of diminishing returns at this point... while it will please Poconuts, feels a bit generic and tired and in need of another voice or two."

== Track listing ==
No.	Title	Writer(s)	Length
1.	"All Fired Up"	Rusty Young, Mary Young	3:28
2.	"Drink It In"	Craig Bickhardt, Jack Sundrud	3:43
3.	"That's What Rock and Roll Will Do"	Michael Webb	4:49
4.	"Regret"	Young	6:20
5.	"When She's Mine"	Sundrud, Richard Wold	3:20
6.	"A Little Rain"	Young	4:46
7.	"Hard Country"	Sundrud, Bruce Miller	7:27
8.	"Love Has No Reason"	Michael Webb, Tom Littlefield	3:21
9.	"Rockin' Horse"	Young	5:22
10.	"Neil Young"	Young	4:24
11.	"Long Shot"	Sundrud	4:32
12.	"Pucky Huddle Stomp"	Young	1:56

== Personnel ==
Poco

- Rusty Young – vocals, acoustic guitars, electric guitars, pedal steel guitar, lap steel guitar, dobro, banjo, mandolin, percussion
- Jack Sundrud – vocals, acoustic guitars, electric guitars, bass, harmonica
- Michael Webb – vocals, acoustic piano, Hammond B3 organ, clavinet, accordion, acoustic guitars, electric guitars, mandolin, bass
- George Lawrence – drums, congas, percussion

Guest musicians

- George Grantham – percussion on "All Fired Up"
- Bobby Keys – saxophone on "That's What Rock and Roll Will Do"
