= Deliverin' =

Deliverin’

Live album by Poco
- Released: January 13, 1971
- Recorded: September 22–23, 1970
- Venue: Boston Music Hall, Boston and the Felt Forum, New York City
- Genre: Country rock
- Length: 39:38
- Label: Epic
- Producer: Jim Messina

Poco chronology
Poco (1970)	Deliverin’ (1971)	From the Inside (1971)

Deliverin’ is the third album, and first live album, by the American country rock band Poco. Jim Messina quit the band in October 1970, prior to the release of the album. WBCN DJ Charles Laquidara wrote the liner notes.

== Reception ==
Professional ratings
Review scores
Source	Rating
AllMusic	4.5/5 stars
Encyclopedia of Popular Music	3/5 stars

In his AllMusic review, music critic Bruce Eder called the album "About as perfect an album as they ever made and, not coincidentally, by far the biggest seller the early group ever had."

== Track listing ==
1. “I Guess You Made It” (Richie Furay) – 3:58
2. “C’mon” (Furay) – 3:10
3. “Hear That Music” (Timothy B. Schmit) – 3:29
4. “Kind Woman” (Furay) – 6:07
5. “Medley: Hard Luck / Child’s Claim To Fame / Pickin Up The Pieces” (Furay, Schmit) – 4:41
6. “You Better Think Twice” (Jim Messina) – 3:59 (listed as "You'd Better Think Twice")
7. “A Man Like Me” (Furay) – 4:04
8. “Medley: Just in Case It Happens, Yes Indeed / Grand Junction / Consequently So Long” (Furay, Rusty Young, Skip Goodwin) – 9:46

== Personnel ==
- Jim Messina — electric and acoustic lead guitar, vocals
- Richie Furay — electric and acoustic rhythm guitar, vocals
- Rusty Young — steel guitar, dobro, vocals
- Timothy B. Schmit — bass, vocals
- George Grantham — drums, vocals

== Production ==
- Producer: Jim Messina
- Recording Engineer: Jim Reeves
- Liner notes: Pete Fornatale
