= Richie Furay =

American musician (born 1944)

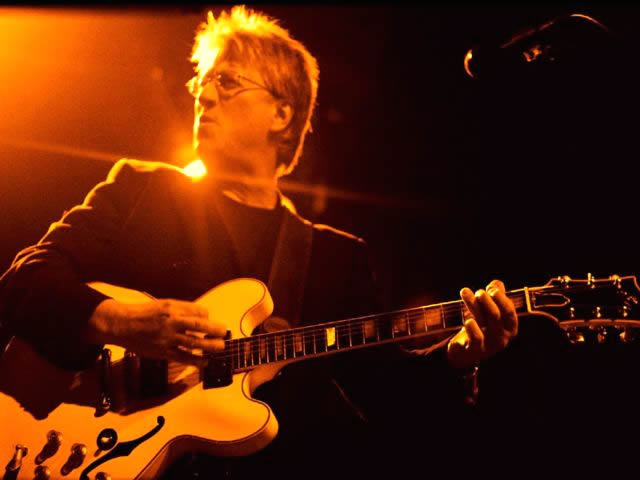

Background information
- Born: Paul Richard Furay; May 9, 1944 (age 82); Dayton, Ohio, U.S.
- Genres: Rock; country rock; folk rock; blues rock; psychedelic rock
- Occupations: Musician, songwriter, Christian minister
- Instruments: Vocals, guitar
- Years active: 1961–present
- Labels: Atco, Asylum, Epic, RCA, Roulette, Myrrh, Calvary Chapel, FridayMusic
- Website: richiefuray.com

Paul Richard Furay (/fjʊˈreɪ/; born May 9, 1944) is an American musician, songwriter, and retired pastor. He co-founded Buffalo Springfield, Poco, and the Souther–Hillman–Furay Band, where in all three groups he helped pioneer the country rock genre. His best known song (originally written during his tenure in Buffalo Springfield, but eventually performed by Poco as well) was "Kind Woman," which he wrote for his wife, Nancy.

During his time in the Souther-Hillman-Furay Band, he converted to Christianity. After releasing several Christian albums as a solo artist, Furay became full-time pastor of the Calvary Chapel in Broomfield, Colorado, serving from 1983 to his eventual retirement in 2017.

In 1997, Furay was inducted into the Rock and Roll Hall of Fame as a member of Buffalo Springfield. In 2015, he was inducted into the Colorado Music Hall of Fame as a member of Poco.

== Biography ==
=== Early life and family ===
Richie Furay was born in Dayton, Ohio, and grew up in the nearby village of Yellow Springs. Furay's parents, Paul and Naomi "Snookie" (née Coffman), managed Furay's Drug Store in downtown Yellow Springs, where Paul would often work long hours and have little time to spend with the young Richie. In 1955, Paul sold the drugstore and established Furay's Gift Shop, where he became highly-respected by the town's children, which included future Ohio governor Mike DeWine. However, in August 1957, shortly before Furay entered the eighth grade, his father died at the age of 45 from a ruptured aortic aneurysm. Naomi managed the store until her eventual retirement and lived in the Yellow Springs area until her death in 2007 at the age of 94.

Furay was inclined towards music from a young age. When he was eight, Furay received his first guitar, a Gibson ES-295, and would attend weekly lessons in the nearby city of Springfield. As a condition for paying for his lessons, Furay's father required him to learn trumpet in high school. In addition, as Furay's elder sister Judy would later recall: "We had an old jukebox in the drugstore, a great big fancy thing. [...] When those records got old [Dad] brought them home. I had no interest in them, but Richard did...[and] he had every single record memorized by their labels." While in middle school, Furay joined his first band, the Barons, a doo-wop group with three older high schoolers; Furay served as lead vocalist. Furay's first musical hero was Ricky Nelson and in high school he became a fan of the Kingston Trio after hearing their 1958 hit cover of "Tom Dooley".

=== Early career ===
After graduating from high school, Furay moved to Westerville to attend Otterbein College, where he would complete three semesters before dropping out and moving to New York City to form a folk trio called the Monks with a two fraternity friends, Bob Harmelink and Nels Gustafson, in the summer of 1964. Furay sang lead and was the driving force behind the group. According to Harmelink, "Richie saw this as his life's work. I saw it as a summer fling. And maybe, just maybe, I might get lucky and hit the big time. It was not all 'I'm going to make it or die here.'" Despite their efforts, the Monks made little money, had to survive off of junk food, and lived in cockroach-infested tenements.

Shortly after arriving, Furay befriended Stephen Stills, another young musician playing in Greenwich Village's various folk clubs and coffeehouses. Before joining Buffalo Springfield, Furay and his Otterbein friends performed with Stills in the nine-member group, the Au Go Go Singers, the house band of the Cafe Au Go Go. However, this group struggled financially and commercially, so after six months Harmelink and Gustafson returned to complete their college education, leaving Furay alone in New York City.

To make ends meet, Furay worked at Pratt & Whitney in East Hartford, Connecticut, for a few months, taking up residence at the home of his girlfriend's family in Wilbraham, Massachusetts. In the summer of 1965, Gram Parsons, a musician friend from New York City, came to visit Furay and introduced him to the folk rock sound of the Byrds's debut album, which inspired him to contact Stills and discuss forming what would later become Buffalo Springfield. However, Stills had since moved to the West Coast and his whereabouts were difficult to pinpoint. In the meantime, Furay became acquainted with Neil Young—who had heard of Furay from Stills—and was impressed by Young's song "Nowadays Clancy Can't Even Sing".

=== Buffalo Springfield ===
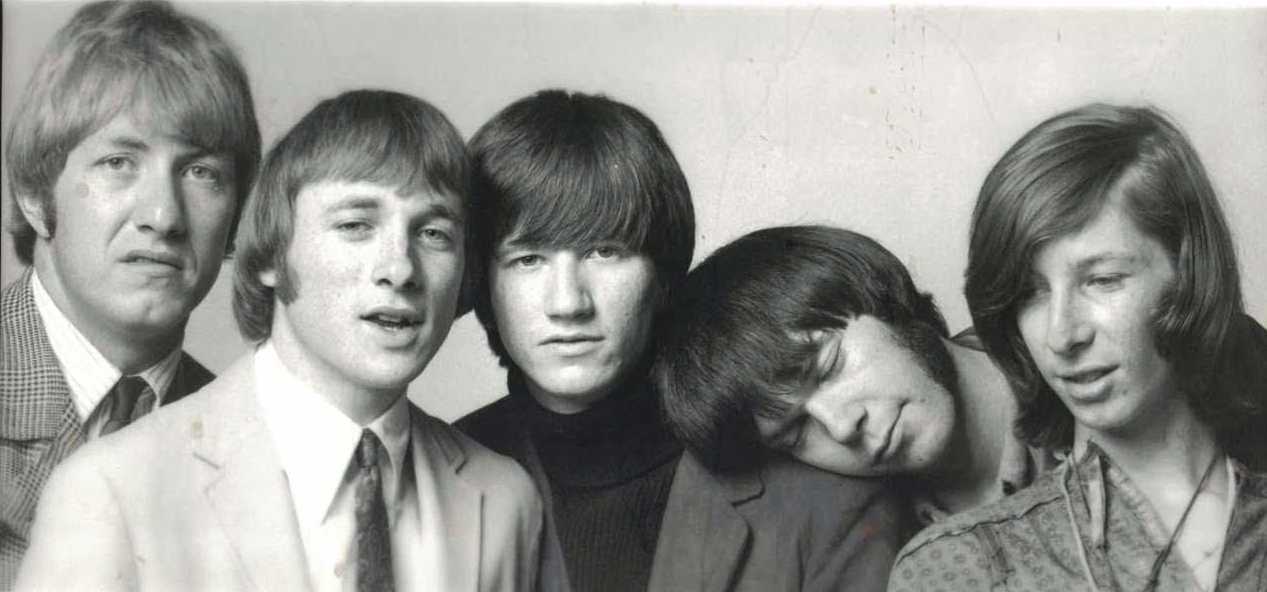
Furay (center) with Buffalo Springfield in 1966

In early February 1966, Furay successfully contacted Stills and flew out to Los Angeles to join the band that he was supposedly assembling. However, much to Furay's disappointment, the "band" at that point only consisted of Stills and himself. Though he considered going back to the East Coast, Furay ultimately decided to move into Stills' one-bedroom apartment in West Hollywood. For weeks, Furay rehearsed the parts and harmonies of Stills' new songs, many of which later appeared on Buffalo Springfield's debut album. On April 6, Furay and Stills accidentally encountered Neil Young and Bruce Palmer while the former was driving his 1953 Pontiac hearse on Sunset Boulevard. Shortly thereafter, Dewey Martin was added and the band settled on the name Buffalo Springfield, taken from a steamroller company merger based in Buffalo, New York and Springfield, Ohio.

"You should have seen Richie on stage at the Whisky. He was a powerhouse. He was so excited, so happy, and so powerful. He would dance on his toes from one side of the stage to the other while singing and playing the guitar. Richie was incredible. I had never seen anything like it."

— Dickie Davis, tour manager of Buffalo Springfield

Less than a month after the band's formation, Buffalo Springfield secured a six-week residency at the Whisky a Go Go. As Furay described the experience: "The Whisky was as good as we ever were, as dynamic as we ever were, as close as we ever were...because we were working every day. [...] We were tight, we were good, and we felt we were good." During performances, Furay would typically be positioned center stage, playing rhythm guitar and singing whilst being flanked by Stills and Young on each side. In partial imitation of Roger McGuinn, Furay often played a 12-string Gibson ES-335.

On the band's debut single, "Nowadays Clancy Can't Even Sing", Furay contributed lead vocals; on the B-side, "Go and Say Goodbye", Furay sang lead in unison with Stills. Furay later sang lead vocals on "Do I Have to Come Right Out and Say It", the B-side to the band's signature song, "For What It's Worth". Of the 35 songs released by the band during its brief existence, Furay sang lead or co-lead vocals on 15 tracks, second only to Stephen Stills (16) and much higher than Neil Young (6), Dewey Martin (1), and Jim Messina (1).

While Furay did not write any of the songs on the band's debut album, he individually penned three tracks on the follow-up album Buffalo Springfield Again and two on the final album, Last Time Around, where he also received co-writing credit on the songs "It's So Hard to Wait" (with Neil Young) and "The Hour of Not Quite Rain" (with Micki Callen). Furay wrote "A Child's Claim to Fame" about his frustrations with bandmate Neil Young. As Furay once stated: "He was in, he was out, he was in, and he was out. He wasn't at Monterey. (Note: David Crosby of the Byrds controversially filled in for Young during their Sunday night set.) We were gonna do the Johnny Carson Show and he didn't show up to get on the plane that day." According to biographer Thomas M. Kitts, Young's song "I Am a Child", which imitated the country ballad sound of "A Child's Claim to Fame", may have been a direct and sarcastic response to Furay (and Stills, with whom he also shared interpersonal difficulties).

"The very first Buffalo Springfield record is the only group record. With the second record, people started to bring in other people....Neil and Steve, in particular, would go off to experiment with other musicians."

— Richie Furay

On March 20, 1968, Buffalo Springfield and Eric Clapton were arrested in a drug bust while jamming at the home of Stills' girlfriend. Furay and his wife Nancy were among the arrested and placed in a jail cell. Eventually, the band and others were simply charged with "disturbing the peace," and Furay's testimony helped spare Clapton from deportation. By the summer of 1968, the band had effectively fallen apart, leaving Furay and Jim Messina (who had replaced Palmer earlier that year) to cull through old recordings and compile what would become Buffalo Springfield's final album, Last Time Around.

=== Poco ===
After the dissolution of Buffalo Springfield, Furay and Messina decided to form a new group that would blend the sounds of country with rock. Furay helped recruit steel guitarist Rusty Young and drummer George Grantham, commenting that with the latter "there was no danger that his ego would run amuck." He also invited Gregg Allman and Gram Parsons, but neither ultimately joined the group. With Randy Meisner joining on bass, the band had, by the end of 1968, become a highly-popular live act at the Troubadour and began recording their debut album, Pickin' Up the Pieces. Clive Davis, the president of Columbia Records, wanted to sign the band, but Furay was still under contract to ATCO (a subsidiary of Atlantic Records); at the same time, Atlantic wanted to sign Crosby, Stills & Nash but Graham Nash (an ex-member of the Hollies) was still under contract with Columbia, so the two record labels traded the musicians.

Furay wrote or co-wrote all tracks on Pickin' Up the Pieces, save for Rusty Young's "Grand Junction". As Furay would later comment: "If you look into the songs I wrote on the first Poco album...I was still trying to figure out what happened and express my feelings on those two years in the Springfield." However, before the album's release, Meisner abruptly quit the band after Furay refused to let him participate in the mixing process. Furay then decided to bring in Timothy B. Schmit and frequently defended him against Messina and Young, who both took issue with Schmit's musicianship and personality.

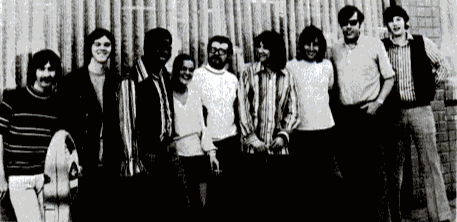
Poco pictured with the staff of KFRC, c. 1970. Furay is fourth from right, wearing the striped shirt

In mid-1970, after the middling success of Poco's self-titled sophomore album (peaking at #58 on the Billboard 200), the rift between Furay and Messina began to widen. Furay has claimed that "[Messina] made the group more country than I had ever envisaged it. I wanted it more rock 'n' roll right at the beginning." Messina felt that Furay's control over the band was growing too overbearing, and so he quit in the summer of that year. Furay then chose Paul Cotton as Messina's successor.

Furay remained with Poco for three more studio albums (From the Inside, A Good Feelin' to Know, and Crazy Eyes) but he was growing impatient with the band's lack of mainstream success—something which had since come to ex-bandmates Stephen Stills, Neil Young, Jim Messina, and Randy Meisner (who had become the bassist for the Eagles). In 1973, he decided to contact his friend David Geffen, the then-head of Asylum Records, who proposed creating a supergroup with JD Souther and Chris Hillman, the latter of whom was looking to leave the Stephen Stills-led supergroup Manassas. Furay took up Geffen on his offer and played his final gig with Poco at the Worcester Polytechnic Institute on September 4, 1973.

=== SHF band, conversion to Christianity, resolving marriage troubles ===
Furay left Poco in late 1973 to form the Souther–Hillman–Furay Band. The lineup was further rounded out with drummer Jim Gordon and three ex-Manassas members: Paul Harris (keyboards), Joe Lala (percussion), and Al Perkins (pedal steel guitar). The optimistic Furay, who sought to create a family atmosphere within the group, struggled to work with the cynical JD Souther, who once described himself as "elusive and hard to find." Although the supergroup's self-titled debut album was certified gold and yielded the top-30 hit "Fallin' in Love" in 1974, the group could not follow up on that success, and poor record sales of the follow-up album, Trouble in Paradise, eventually led to its breakup.

Initially, Furay was completely opposed to Hillman's suggestion that the openly-Christian Perkins—who had a fish sticker bearing the text "Jesus lives" on his guitar—be allowed to join the group, believing that such an open proclamation of faith would be a barrier to the band's mainstream success. However, Furay relented and, to his surprise, developed a close personal friendship with Perkins. During one dinner with Furay and his wife Nancy, Perkins played an audio tape of a sermon by Chuck Smith; initially annoyed, Furay soon became captivated by the message. Though in his youth Furay's family attended a Methodist church every week, he had essentially become irreligious by the time he reached adulthood. Eventually, before the band was due to play in Aspen, Colorado, Furay prayed with Perkins and accepted Christ, beginning the path of mending his strained marriage.

"I was crying my brains out. I had to pull off the road. I was crying out to God, "I want my family back. I want them back." I can still hear that still, small voice, “That’s how much I want you to want Me.” He was showing Nancy and I during that seven-month separation that He had to be first in our lives."

— Richie Furay

Due to Furay's busyness on the road, emotional disconnect, and an extramarital affair during his time in Poco, Nancy at the time was intent on a divorce. Yet having recently converted to Christianity on her own, her husband's newfound faith challenged her to seek reconciliation. Nancy was not yet comfortable accepting him back, and so the pair endured seven months of separation. Richie and Nancy Furay finally reconciled after the birth of their second daughter on June 25, 1975.

=== Solo career and Christian music ===
After the dissolution of the SHF band, Furay signed a three-album deal with Asylum Records. After moving from Los Angeles to Sugarloaf Mountain near Boulder, Colorado, Furay formed The Richie Furay Band with Jay Truax, John Mehler, and Tom Stipe, releasing the album I've Got a Reason in July 1976, which reflected Furay's newfound beliefs. The band then embarked on a three-month tour, opening for acts such as the Beach Boys, the Band, Leon Russell, Hot Tuna, and the Marshall Tucker Band.

Furay's second solo album, Dance a Little Light, was released in 1978. The title track of his final album with Asylum Records, 1979's I Still Have Dreams, was the only Top 40 hit of his solo career, peaking at #39 for three weeks. In 1982, Furay released the album Seasons of Change on Myrrh Records, a Christian label.

Overall, his albums charted unsatisfactorily, and, compounded with the strain of touring wearing on him and his family, he retired as a performer to become a minister. In 1983, Furay became senior pastor of the Calvary Chapel in Broomfield, Colorado, a non-denominational Christian church in the Denver area, finally retiring from the position in December 2017.

=== Later reunions and activities ===
In 1989, Furay reunited with the original lineup of Poco to release the gold-certified album Legacy. However, as a Christian minister, Furay took issue with particular song lyrics. On the song "The Nature of Love", he successfully petitioned its writers Jeff Silbar and Van Stephenson to change the original line of "Some will find it on the back seat of a Chevrolet" (in reference to a person's loss of virginity) to "Some will never give their hearts away." He refused to perform on Messina's "Look Within", which he deemed as "too New Age." Furay's greatest objection came with the Michael Bay-directed music video for "Call It Love", which featured shots of the band miming the song interspersed with scenes of sweaty, scantily-clad young adults pouring water onto each other. Feeling that his input was being ignored by the band and its management, Furay promptly quit the reunion to focus on his pastoral activities.

In 1997, Furay released In My Father's House on Calvary Chapel Music, which featured former Poco bandmate Rusty Young on steel guitar and dobro. His 2005 album, I Am Sure, featured contributions from Poco bandmates (Jim Messina, Chris Hillman, Rusty Young, and Paul Cotton) and three members from the Nitty Gritty Dirt Band (Jeff Hanna, Jimmy Ibbotson, and Bob Carpenter).

In 2006 he released his album The Heartbeat of Love, and also toured as an opening act for America and Linda Ronstadt. In 2007, he toured with a new formation of the Richie Furay Band. At the Boulder and Bluebird Theatres in Colorado, they recorded a double live album ALIVE. The ALIVE set covers 29 songs of Furay's career. The Richie Furay band continued to tour through 2008 and 2009.

Furay appeared with Poco for several shows in early 2009. At the Stagecoach Festival in Indio, California in 2009, Furay and the current Poco lineup were joined onstage by original members Jim Messina and George Grantham and former bass player Timothy B. Schmit.

On October 23, 2010, he reunited with former Buffalo Springfield bandmates Stephen Stills and Neil Young for a set at the 24th annual Bridge School Benefit at Shoreline Amphitheater in Mountain View, California. The reunion continued in 2011 for a one-month tour of California, headlining 2011 Bonnaroo. In July 2011, Furay announced on his Facebook page that he would be touring with Buffalo Springfield in early 2012, ending speculation there would be a 2011 fall tour with them. In 2011, Furay collaborated with the Piedmont Brothers Band as guest vocalist on the albums PBB III (2011), Back To The Country (2013), and A Piedmont Christmas (2015). He appeared on the 2013 Carla Olson album, Have Harmony, Will Travel. In 2015, he released the new album Hand in Hand to positive critical reviews.

On June 13, 2018, the Richie Furay Band began the Deliverin' Tour at the South Orange Performing Arts Center (SOPAC) in New Jersey. The first set consisted of Buffalo Springfield, Poco, Souther, Hillman & Furay Band and solo material, followed by a second set with the classic 1971 Poco live album DeLIVErin' being performed in its entirety. A single, “I Guess You Made It”, was released on Furay's website.

The tour continued throughout the year, culminating with a Poco 50th Anniversary Celebration on November 16, 2018, at the Troubadour in Los Angeles, where Poco first performed in 1969. Randy Meisner and Peter Asher were in the audience (Poco bandmate and longtime friend, Timothy B. Schmit performed with Furay.) Furay's Troubadour show was recorded and, in April, 2021, was released in both CD and DVD as DeLIVErin' Again (50th Anniversary: Return to the Troubadour). In the same year, Furay released the single, "America, America" through his website.

=== Recent years ===
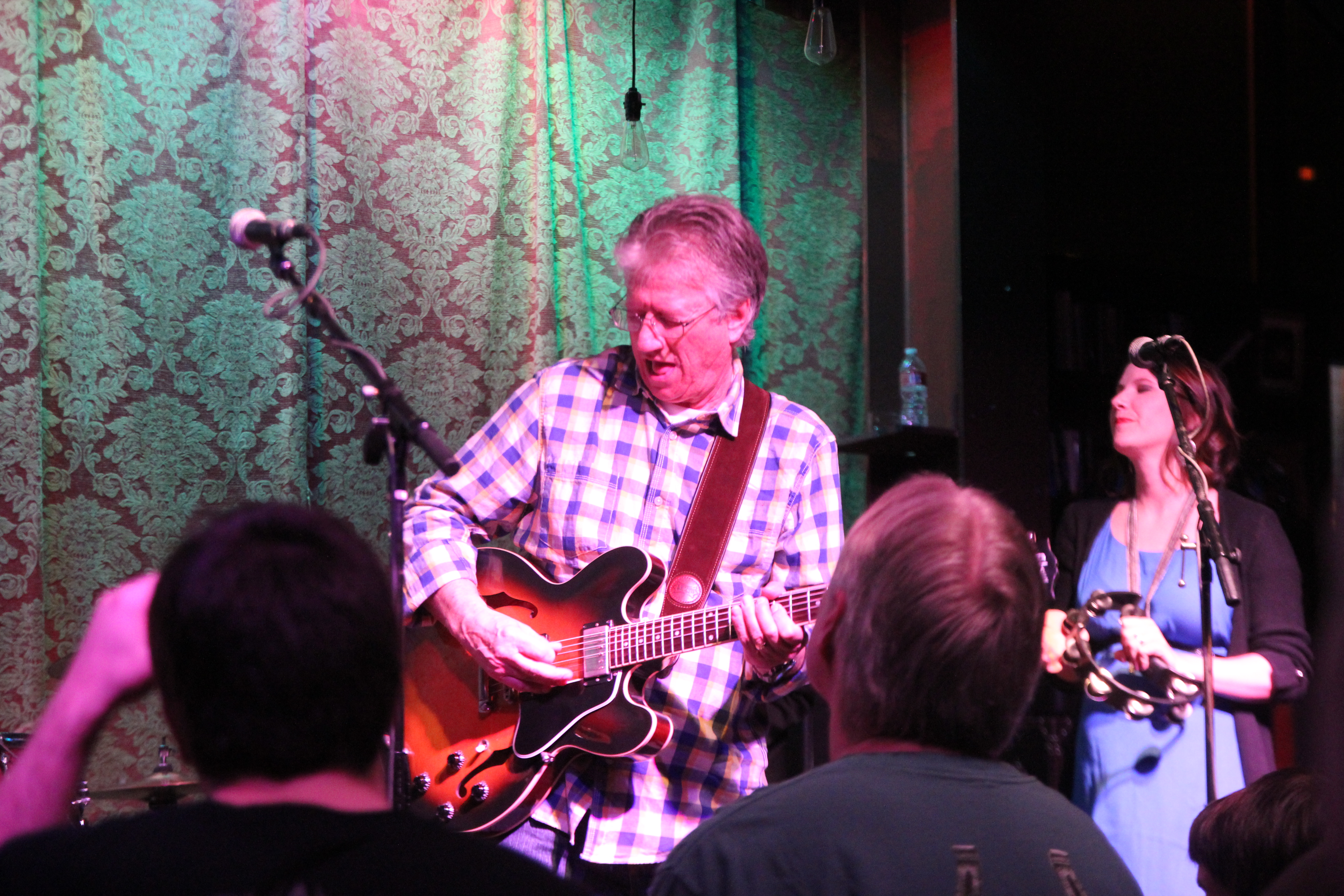
Furay performing in 2015

In mid-2019, Furay announced he would be retiring from touring as a headliner. He embarked on a tour of the west coast in the fall of 2019, sharing the bill with Dave Mason. Furay's “Farewell/76th Birthday Celebration” was originally scheduled to take place at the South Orange Performing Arts Center (SOPAC) in New Jersey in 2020; however, due to the COVID-19 pandemic and storm damage to the SOPAC building, the show was postponed until 2022, so he performed a "Farewell Show" at Drew University in Madison, New Jersey on November 14, 2021 (the date of the originally scheduled SOPAC show.) He scheduled a few one-off shows in Colorado and California in the spring of 2022, with the SOPAC "Farewell Show" rescheduled for June 2022 at SOPAC, under the direction of his manager, David Stone. He included "Crazy Love" and "Bad Weather" in the shows, as a tribute to Poco bandmates Rusty Young and Paul Cotton, respectively; they both died in 2021.

In June and July 2022, Furay kicked off a mini-tour, beginning in New Jersey, as well as the City Winery in Nashville, New York City, Washington DC, Philadelphia, and Boston. The shows were billed as Furay's farewell tour in support of his album In the Country which has cover versions of Furay's favorite country songs. In the Country features a cover of Keith Urban's "Someone Like You", released as a single. The recording also contains songs by John Denver, Garth Brooks, George Strait, Marc Cohn, and Ricky Nelson, as well as a remake of the Poco song "Pickin' Up the Pieces".

A documentary, Through It All: The Life and Influence of Richie Furay is currently in post-production. It is narrated by Cameron Crowe. In a 2024 radio interview with Daniel Jones (guitarist with 7th Order) on his KNKR radio show The Volcano Chronicles, Furay stated that the documentary may be released as soon as early 2025.

== Personal life ==
Furay married his wife Nancy on March 4, 1967, less than a year after he first spotted her in the audience of a Buffalo Springfield show at the Whisky a Go Go; this "love at first sight" moment inspired many of his songs, such as "Kind Woman" and "Merry-Go-Round". Richie and Nancy Furay have four daughters and thirteen grandchildren. He is a born-again Christian.

== Discography ==
=== Solo ===
Studio albums

- I've Got a Reason (1976) (Asylum) (US Billboard #130)
- Dance a Little Light (1978) (Asylum)
- I Still Have Dreams (1979) (Asylum)
- Seasons of Change (1982) (Myrrh Records)
- In My Father's House (1997) (Calvary Chapel Records)
- I Am Sure (2005) (FridayMusic)
- The Heartbeat of Love (2006) (Richie Furay and John Macy)
- Hand in Hand (2015) (Entertainment One)
- In the Country (2022)

Live albums

- ALIVE (2007) (FridayMusic)
- DeLIVErin' Again (Return to the Troubadour: 50th Anniversary) (2021) (DSDK Productions)

Compilation albums

- Poco: The Songs of Richie Furay (1980) (Epic Records)

Singles

- Richie Furay: "This Magic Moment" / "Bittersweet Love" (1978) (Asylum) (US Billboard #101)
- Richie Furay: "I Still Have Dreams" / "Headin' South" (1979) (Asylum) (US Billboard #39)

=== Band projects ===
As a member of the Au Go-Go Singers:

- Au Go-Go Singers (with Stephen Stills) (1964) (Roulette Records)

As a member of Buffalo Springfield:

- Buffalo Springfield (1966) (Atco)
- Buffalo Springfield Again (1967) (Atco)
- Last Time Around (1968) (Atco)

As a member of Poco:

- Pickin' Up the Pieces (1969) (Epic)
- Poco (1970) (Epic)
- Deliverin' (1971) (Epic)
- From the Inside (1971) (Epic)
- A Good Feelin' to Know (1972) (Epic)
- Crazy Eyes (1973) (Epic)
- Legacy (1989) (RCA)

As a member of Souther–Hillman–Furay Band

- The Souther–Hillman–Furay Band (1974) (Asylum)
- Trouble in Paradise (1975) (Asylum)
