= Paul Cotton =

American guitarist (1943–2021)

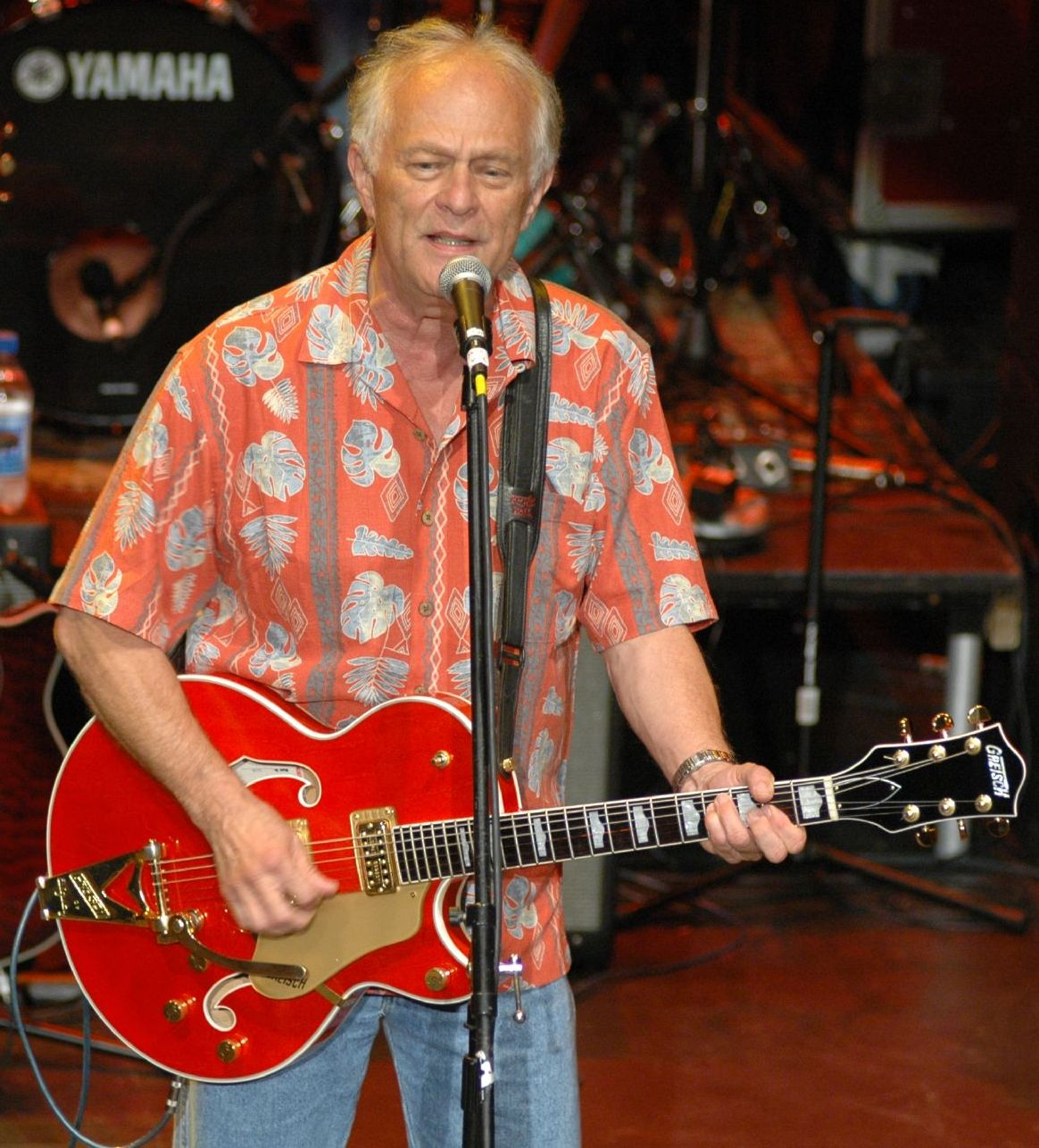
- Cotton performing in June 2007

Background information
- Born: Norman Paul Cotton; February 26, 1943; Fort Rucker, Alabama, U.S.
- Died: July 31, 2021 (aged 78) near Eugene, Oregon, U.S.
- Genres: Rock, country rock, country, pop
- Occupation: Musician
- Instruments: Guitar, vocals
- Years active: 1968–2021
- Labels: Columbia, Epic
- Formerly of: Poco

Norman Paul Cotton (February 26, 1943 – July 31, 2021) was an American guitarist and singer-songwriter. He was a member of the band Poco and the writer of their international hit song "Heart of the Night". Before that, he was co-guitarist for the Illinois Speed Press.

== Early life ==
Cotton was born in Fort Rucker, Alabama, on February 26, 1943. He started learning the guitar when he was 13 years old, and became involved in his first band a year later. He relocated to Illinois by age 16 and joined the Mus-Twangs, which later became the Illinois Speed Press. He played for the group throughout the next decade until 1970, when it dissolved due to the divergent musical interests of him and Kal David.

== Career ==
Cotton joined Poco in 1970, replacing Jim Messina. Most of Cotton's music career was as songwriter, lead guitarist and lead singer for the group. Cotton's best known song with Poco is "Heart of the Night", which was a major hit from the band's Legend album, released in 1978; the song is an evocation of the night life of the city of New Orleans.

Cotton proclaimed in a September 2000 interview with Sound Waves magazine, "I'm just drawn to the South. Hey, I spent 25 winters in Chicago."

Cotton's experiences in New Orleans had been the basis for a previous composition, "Down in the Quarter", featured on the 1975 Poco album Head Over Heels, and Cotton has described a track from the 1982 Poco album Ghost Town, "Break of Hearts", as being a follow-up to "Heart of the Night. In 1978, Cotton and Rusty Young, "got a little rehearsal hall, put together a band, and played 'Heart of the Night'" for ABC Records executives. Both tracks were credited to Poco. He also penned "Barbados", "Indian Summer", "Ride The Country", and "Bad Weather". He briefly left the band in 1987, before returning in 1992.

== Later life ==
Cotton moved to Key West, Florida, in 2005, shortly after Hurricane Wilma struck the area. He met his future wife there, and enjoyed fishing, sailing and sunning when not working on his music. He was actively involved in the Key West community performing at various benefit shows in the area. Cotton left Poco in early 2010 and went on to release several solo albums. He was inducted into the Colorado Music Hall of Fame, together with his fellow Poco bandmates.

Cotton died at his summer home near Eugene, Oregon, on July 31, 2021, at the age of 78.

== Solo discography ==
- 1990 Changing Horses (Curb)
- 2001 Firebird
- 2004 When the Coast Is Clear
- 2007 Sunset Kidd
- 2014 100% Paul Cotton
