= George Grantham (musician) =

American drummer and vocalist (born 1947)

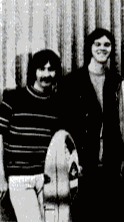
- Grantham (left) and Rusty Young at KFRC in 1970.

Background information
- Born: January 20, 1947 (age 79); Cordell, Oklahoma, U.S.
- Genres: Country rock
- Occupations: Drummer, singer

George Grantham (born January 20, 1947) is an American drummer and vocalist best known for his work with pioneering country rock band Poco.

== Early career ==
Grantham and pedal steel guitarist Rusty Young were members of the Denver-based psychedelic rock act Boenzee Cryque when Young left the band in mid-1968 for Los Angeles. There, Young fell in with Buffalo Springfield members Richie Furay and Jim Messina as they wrapped up that band's final album.

== Poco ==
With Buffalo Springfield disintegrated, Furay, Messina, and Young joined to create a new band, originally named "Pogo" but then shortly rechristened "Poco" after copyright concerns forced a change. The band needed a drummer, and Young recruited Grantham, who became part of Poco's founding lineup. Grantham's backup vocals were an important element of the band's distinctive harmony sound. Grantham remained a member of various Poco lineups through 1977, a span of ten studio albums and two live releases. He returned in 1985, and was part of four of five band incarnations before departing again 1990. Reunited once more in 2000, he suffered a debilitating stroke in 2004 and was unable to rejoin the band again until some vocals-only appearances in 2009.
