= Rusty Young (musician) =

American guitarist (1946–2021)

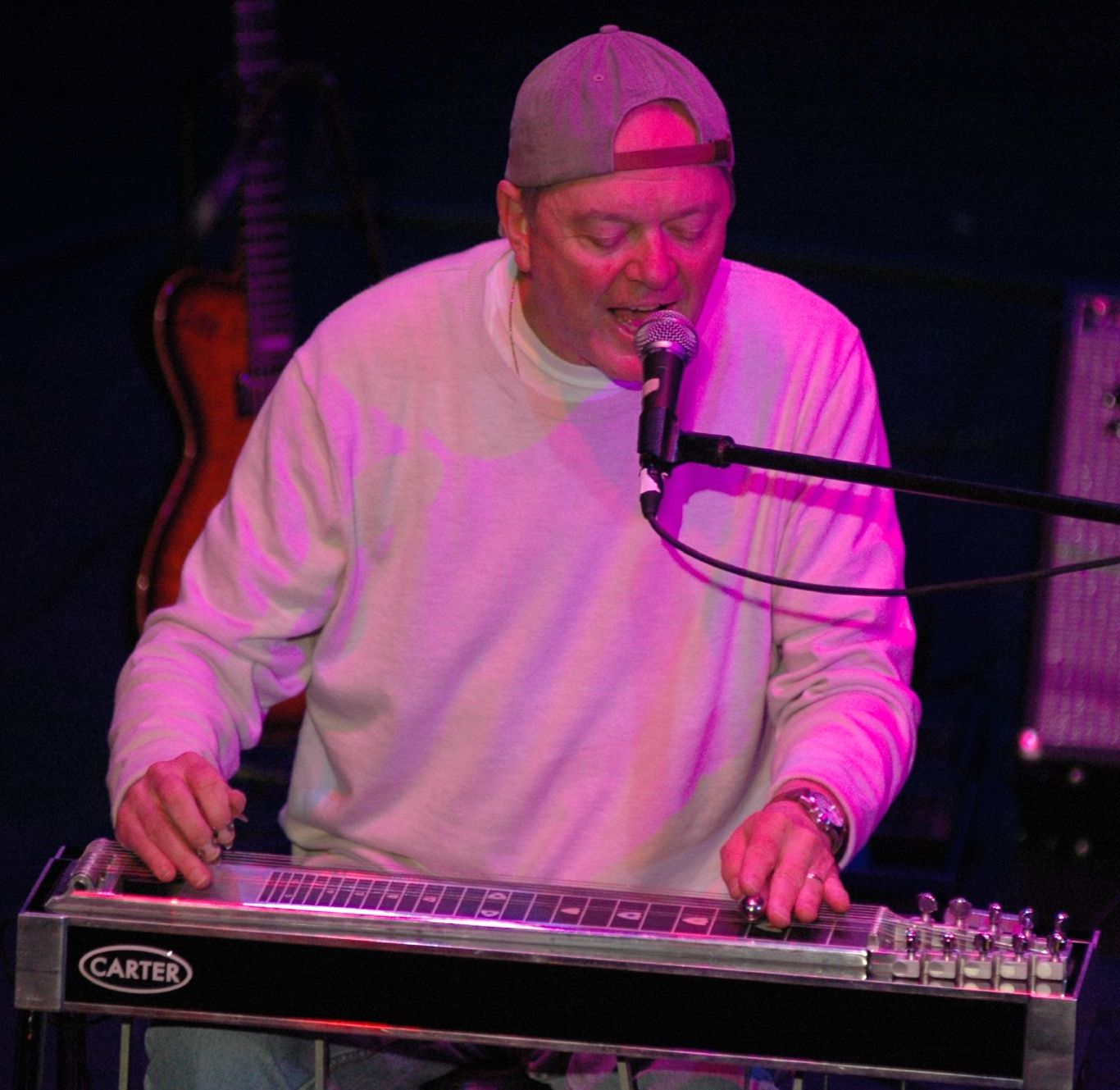
- Young performing with Poco in 2007

Background information
- Born: Norman Russell Young; February 23, 1946; Long Beach, California, US
- Origin: Los Angeles, California, US
- Died: April 14, 2021 (aged 75) Davisville, Missouri, US
- Genres: Country rock; folk rock; soft rock; americana
- Occupation: Musician
- Instruments: Pedal steel guitar; guitar; banjo; mandolin; vocals
- Years active: 1968–2021
- Formerly of: Poco

Norman Russell Young (February 23, 1946 – April 14, 2021) was an American guitarist, vocalist and songwriter, best known as one of the frontmen in the influential country rock and Americana band Poco.

A virtuoso on pedal steel guitar, he was celebrated for the ability to get a Hammond B3 organ sound out of the instrument by playing it through a Leslie speaker cabinet and as an innovator of producing other rock sounds from the instrument.

== Early life ==
Young was born in Long Beach, California and raised in Colorado. He began playing lap steel guitar at age 6, and taught guitar and steel guitar lessons during his high school years at Jefferson High School, Lakewood, Colorado with George Grantham. During that time, he also played country music in late night bars. Young played in a well known Denver psychedelic rock band "Boenzee Cryque".

== Career ==
=== Poco ===
In the late 1960s, an acquaintance of Young's, Miles Thomas, became the road manager for Buffalo Springfield. Richie Furay and Jim Messina needed a steel guitarist for the Furay ballad "Kind Woman" on their final album Last Time Around and after Thomas told Young about the opportunity, Young was hired. Along with Furay and Messina, Young became a founding member of Poco in 1968 upon the former band's demise. Drummer George Grantham and bass player Randy Meisner rounded out the original Poco lineup. The band's membership fluctuated over the years. After Furay left the group, Young took on more song writing responsibility, along with Paul Cotton and Timothy B. Schmit. Young is best known for writing the Poco songs "Rose of Cimarron" and "Crazy Love". In 2013, Young was inducted into the Steel Guitar Hall of Fame. At the end of 2013, Young announced his, what turned out to be a short-lived, retirement.

A few shows were booked into 2014 including three farewell shows in Florida. One of those shows was a performance in a recording studio in front of a live audience for a DVD document of the band's live show. Young said there could be some one-offs in the future after that, but the band would not be actively touring as before. Young and Jack Sundrud wrote and recorded music for children's story videos as the "Session Cats". Young continued to do guest performances with former members of Poco and other country rock artists. Young released his first solo album in 2017 on Blue Élan Records, Waitin' For The Sun. Young released his first new music since Waitin' for the Sun on March 22, 2019. The new tune, "Listen to Your Heart", was released digitally and benefited a local Steelville, Missouri animal charity, Santana's Hope for Paws (Friends of Steelville, MO Pound) Animal Shelter.

== Death ==
Young died of a heart attack on April 14, 2021, at the age of 75.
