= Pierre St. Germain =

Métis fur trader and interpreter (c. 1790 – c. 1875)

- Born: c. 1790; North-Western Territory
- Died: c. 1870s Cowlitz Prairie, Lewis County, Washington Territory
- Spouse: Lizette Sutherland
- Children: 6

Pierre St. Germain (c. 1790 – c. 1875) was a Métis interpreter and fur trader, notable for his service in John Franklin's Coppermine expedition. Born c. 1790, possibly to a family of North West Company (NWC) interpreters, he was first employed with the NWC in 1812, before transferring to the Hudson's Bay Company (HBC). He served for several years as an interpreter in Athabasca Country before employment as a guide for the Franklin expedition. The expedition, plagued by supply shortages due to conflicts between the NWC and HBC, was devastated by starvation on the return journey from the Arctic coast, leading to the deaths of the majority of the participants. After twenty years of service in the fur trade, he settled in the Red River Colony at what is now Winnipeg. Ten years later, he and his family participated in James Sinclair's settler expedition to the Columbia District, part of a HBC plan to bolster the nascent Puget Sound Agricultural Company. He remained in the Cowlitz Prairie with his family for the rest of his life, dying at some point in the 1870s.

== Early life and family ==
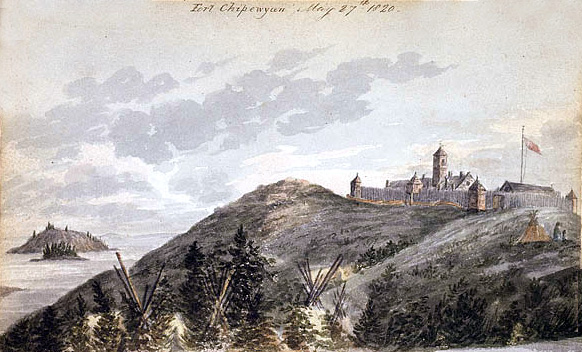
Illustration of Fort Chipewyan by George Back, 1820

Pierre St. Germain was born c. 1790 in the North-Western Territory. He was Métis, of French Canadian and Chipewyan ancestry. Paul St. Germain, a North West Company interpreter active in the Athabasca Country, has been proposed as Pierre St. Germain's grandfather. Pierre may have been the son of another Pierre St. Germain referenced as the father of a Slave River-based woman named Catherine Beaulieu née St. Germain. Historical records indicate that Pierre St. Germain was married to a Métis woman named Lizette Sutherland.

St. Germain was employed by the North West Company (NWC) from 1812 to 1819. He switched to the rival Hudson's Bay Company (HBC) in 1819, shortly before their merger with the NWC, where he received almost twice his previous wage. In late 1819, he was active as an interpreter at the HBC post of Fort Resolution on the Great Slave Lake. St. Germain was regarded by HBC administrators as an intelligent and talented interpreter able to travel long distances without provisions, but was also seen as a renegade and an alcoholic. In early December 1819, Robert McVicar, commander of Fort Resolution, reluctantly dispatched St. Germain to Fort Wedderburn on Lake Athabasca, with orders to return promptly. St. Germain instead opted to remain at nearby Fort Chipewyan to celebrate the New Year's holiday and did not return to Fort Resolution until January 20, leading McVicar to complain that he was showing "complete contempt for the interests of the concern."

== Coppermine expedition ==
Following the Napoleonic Wars, the Admiralty placed great emphasis on the discovery of a hypothetical Northwest Passage, supposedly offering a viable Arctic sea route between the Atlantic and Pacific Oceans. Royal Navy officer John Franklin, following an abortive 1818 expedition to Svalbard, was tasked to lead an overland expedition to chart the North American coastline of the Arctic Ocean along the Coppermine River, last traveled by explorer Samuel Hearne in the early 1770s. This expedition was hoped to meet with a concurrent expedition by William Edward Parry, intended to discover and traverse the supposed passage. In June 1820, St. Germain was permitted to join Franklin's expedition as a guide and interpreter. He met with the expedition at Fort Chipewyan by July 2, 1820, and was formally hired at Fort Resolution later that month at an extremely high wage of £150 per year, over two-and-a-half times what was offered to French voyageurs on the same expedition.

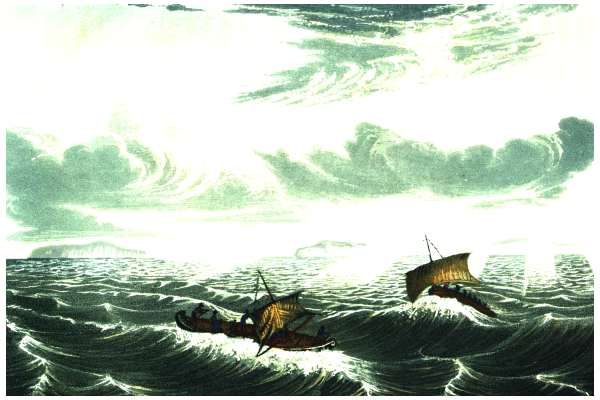
Depiction of canoes constructed by St. Germain caught in a gale in Coronation Gulf

He travelled with the party to Fort Enterprise, leading an revolt against Franklin on August 13 due to a concern for the expedition's lack of provisions; Franklin dispelled the mutiny by declaring that, if one to happen again, he would kill whoever expressed concerns first. St. Germain accompanied George Back and Robert Hood on a preliminary expedition to Point Lake on the Coppermine River from August 29 to September 10, 1820. Departing from Fort Enterprise again on November 28, 1820, he accompanied eight voyageurs across the Great Slave Lake to Fort Providence to acquire a shipment of supplies for the expedition. He stayed at the fort for the latter half of December while the voyageurs returned. St. Germain and the NWC's representative Willard Wentzel travelled to the nearby HBC post at Moose Deer Island, where the expedition's two hired Inuit interpreters, Tatannuaq and Hoeootoerock, had camped for the winter. The four returned together to Fort Enterprise on January 27, 1821.

The expedition started down the Coppermine in June 1821 and reached the sea on July 18, plagued by supply shortages exacerbated by the HBC-NWC rivalry. Upon arriving at the shore, St. Germain, alongside fellow interpreter Jean Baptiste Adam, requested to leave the expedition, believing the next phase would be too hazardous. Franklin, afraid of the expedition as a whole perishing without their hunting skills, forced the men to stay. The party turned east, charting several hundred kilometers of the Arctic coastline. Halting at Point Turnagain in late August, Franklin opted for the expedition to return via the Hood River. Unable to live off the land due to winter conditions, 11 out of the 20 members of the expedition died before they could be rescued by hunters under the leadership of Akaitcho.

== Later career and retirement to Red River ==
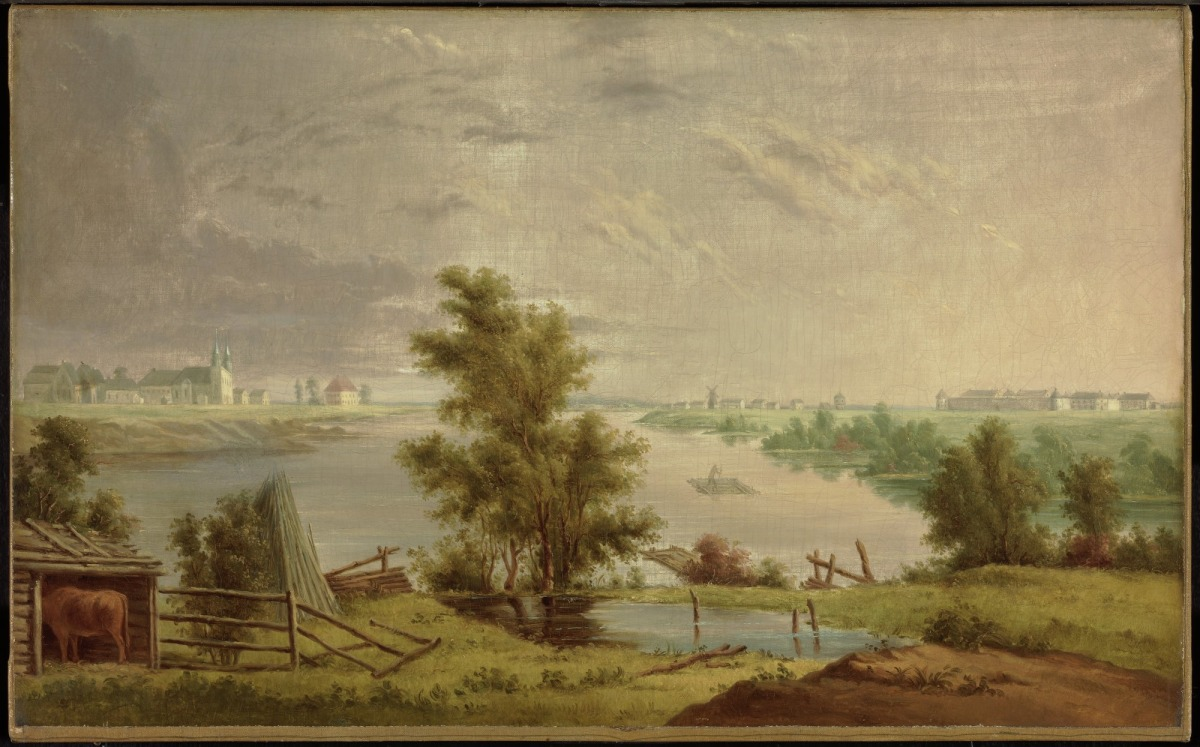
Landscape of the Red River settlement by Paul Kane, early 1850s

St. Germain returned to Fort Chipewyan on January 21, 1822, and described the Coppermine expedition to George Simpson, the new Hudson's Bay governor. On September 6, 1822, he was hired by Alexander McLeod as an interpreter at Lake Athabasca, at reduced wages due to cost-cutting measures by newly-appointed Rupert's Land governor George Simpson. He was entrusted with the care of a young daughter of a voyageur who had left the region in 1822. He was listed as the girl's immediate protector in company records for 1823 and 1824. During this time he resided at the post of Fort Norman. In September 1826, following the return of Franklin's party to the Great Bear Lake during the Mackenzie River expedition, St. Germain was dispatched from Fort Simpson to ferry clothes and provisions for the expedition's final winter. At Fort Norman, he provided Edward Nicholas Kendall with the supplies, who brought them to the expedition party at Fort Franklin.

Having saved a considerable sum of money during his work for the HBC, St. Germain retired to the Red River Colony in September 1834. In April 1835, he purchased 50 acres (20 ha) of riverfront land in St. Vital, now a neighborhood of Winnipeg. He was recorded in the Red River Census of May 1835 as having two acres of land under cultivation, as well as an incorrect birth year of 1800. He was recorded as having two sons — Pierre Jr. and Joseph — and two daughters. His sons left home before the following census in 1838, and another daughter was born. He and his wife had a third son, Simon, c. 1840.

== Sinclair Expedition ==
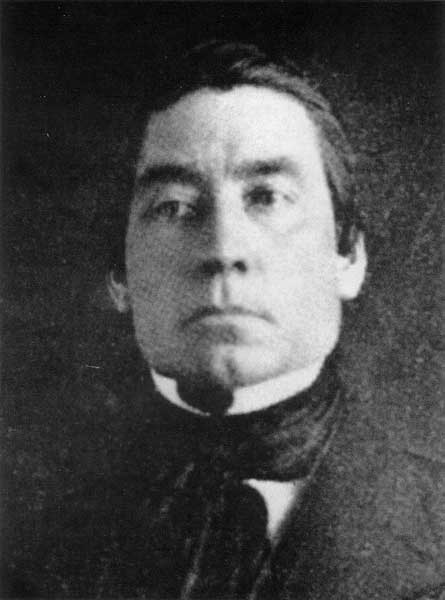
James Sinclair, c. 1850

The Columbia Department was a loosely-settled fur trading district corresponding to the modern Pacific Northwest. Since 1818, it had been under joint British-American control, with the HBC assuming economic hegemony over the region following its merger with the NWC. Governor Simpson took an active interest in developing the HBC's presence in the department. In 1838, Simpson wrote in favor of a plan to settle residents of the Red River Colony in the region to counteract slowly growing numbers of American settlers. This plan received general company support, and orders were given to found agricultural settlements in the lowlands between the Puget Sound and Fort Vancouver, under a subsidiary entity named the Puget Sound Agricultural Company. Trader James Sinclair was appointed to lead the expedition, partially to remove his growing political influence in the colony, especially among fellow Métis settled in the area.

A total of 121 settlers from 23 families, including St. Germain's, accompanied Sinclair. Many of the settlers were Métis living in the colony, generally with experience in the fur trade and the bison hunting held annually in the colony; recent restrictions on free trade in the colony had driven many to seek relocation. The leader of each family brought with them Red River carts. Men and older boys rode horseback, while women and children rode on carts. Supplies were kept extremely minimal, although provisions such as pemmican and tobacco were provided to the settlers by the HBC. St. Germain was accompanied on the journey by his wife and five of his six children. His oldest son Pierre stayed behind, possibly married by the time of the expedition.

The party set out from Fort Garry on June 3, 1841. After passing through Fort Ellice and Fort Carlton, the party was ferried across the North Saskatchewan River to avoid Blackfoot raids. They briefly stopped at the small post of Fort Pitt, where Sinclair hired a Quebec Iroquois interpreter, much to the chagrin of Métis interpreters such as St. Germain, who considered the hire unnecessary. By August, the party reached the much larger HBC post at Fort Edmonton, where Sinclair hired another interpreter, Maskepetoon.

From Fort Edmonton, the party entered the Rockies through the valley of the Bow River (the modern location of Banff). They crossed the Great Divide near the Goat Range and proceeded down the Kootenay, passing Lake Pend Oreille, and eventually reaching another HBC post at Fort Colvile. After acquiring further supplies, they reached Fort Walla Walla (or Fort Nez Percés) on October 4. The fort burned down on the night of their arrival, and the settlers were enlisted to save company property. They acquired batteaux and sailed down the Columbia River, interrupted by a portage at Celilo Falls, towards the HBC stronghold of Fort Vancouver.

== Later life and death ==
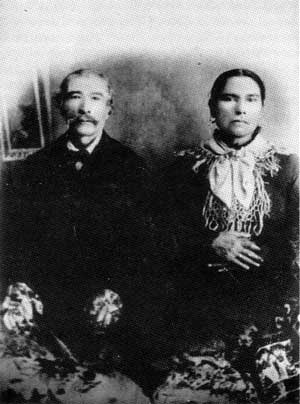
Joseph St. Germain, son of Pierre, and his wife Marie Anne Plamondon

At Fort Vancouver, John McLoughlin (the Chief Factor of the Columbia District) divided the settlement party into two groups. Fourteen families of primarily Orkneyan descent were sent to Fort Nisqually, before eventually transferring to the Willamette Valley. St. Germain and other Métis of French descent were considered ill-suited to agriculture and settled near Fort Cowlitz at a settlement named Saint Francis Xavier. Although various other Catholic Canadian families settled in the Cowlitz Prairie, the St. Germains were one of only three from the Sinclair expedition. St. Germain was named in local parish records as the godfather at several baptisms, and the witness to multiple marriages; he used an "X" as his signature because he did not know how to sign his name.

He was listed in the 1850 U.S. Census as 85 years old, resulting in a birth date about 25 years before those recorded in earlier Hudson Bay Company records. His wife Lizette and their four-year-old son Simon both died in 1844.

In 1847, St. Germain filled a pre-emption for 640 acres of land. He most likely retired from farming before November 1853, as a claim under the Donation Land Claim Act was filed only by his son Joseph. Pierre St. Germain died at some point in the 1870s; an 1882 source by a surviving member of the Sinclair party described him as dying several years prior, at an exaggerated age of 105.
