= Saint Francis Xavier Mission =

Saint Francis Xavier Mission may refer to:

- Saint Francis Xavier Mission (Lewis County, Washington)
- Saint Francis Xavier Mission (De Pere, Wisconsin)
