= Gospodor Monument Park =

Park in the U.S. state of Washington

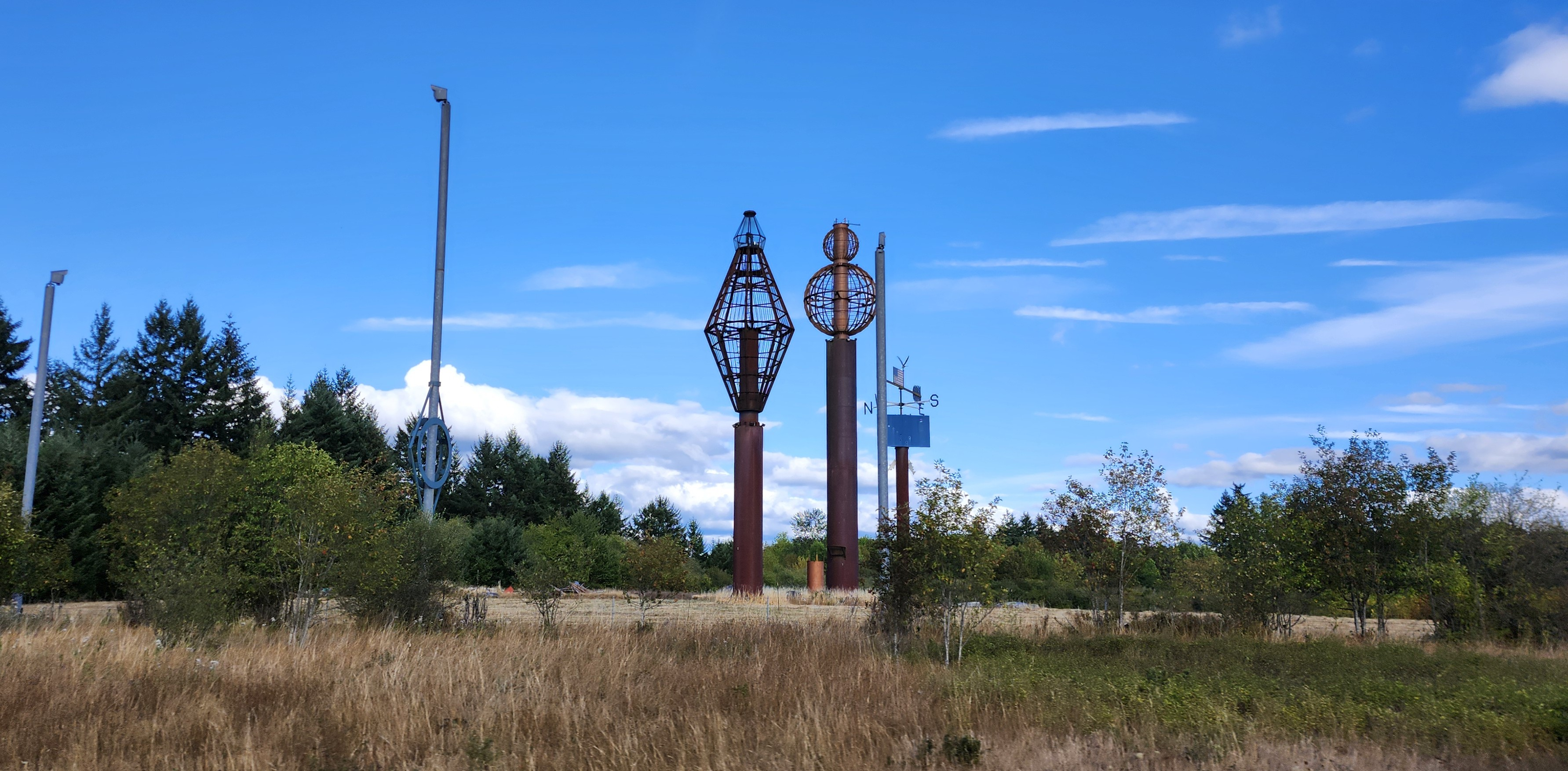
- Remains of Gospodor Monument Park, 2026

- Location within Washington (state)
- Type: Sculpture park
- Location: Toledo, Washington
- Coordinates: 46°27′22″N 122°53′02″W
- Created: 2002
- Status: Closed

Gospodor Monument Park is a roadside attraction along Interstate 5 near Toledo, Washington, in the United States. It features four sculptures, collectively known as the Gospodor monuments, created in 2002. The tallest sculpture, meant to commemorate Mother Teresa, stands over 100 feet (30 m) and features a gold painted wooden statue of Jesus. Another sculpture monument features a carving of Mother Teresa posed in prayer. Two additional towering artworks honor victims of The Holocaust, which features an eternal electric flame, and a 100-foot tall tribute depicting Chief Seattle, commemorating Native Americans and other indigenous tribes. Smaller memorials to historical figures, such as Susan B. Anthony, and a carved, wooden eagle encased in glass, were later added as the park expanded.

After the artworks were installation in 2002, the sculptures caused routine traffic jams due to drivers slowing down and rubbernecking. The monuments, along with their night lights, were highly controversial with local residents and the government of Lewis County acted to prevent additional sculptures from being erected.

Dominic Gospodor, who commissioned the artworks and was the landowner, died in 2010. Ownership of the park was purchased by, and transferred to, the Cowlitz Tribe two years later, with a focus on land and wildlife conservation. Gospodor's estate did not provide any funds to maintain the works and the pieces began decaying due to weather and lack of maintenance. The glass encased eagle, in good condition, was moved to downtown Toledo under a permanent loan agreement between the Cowlitz people and the city.

== See also ==
- 2002 in art
- Commemorations of Mother Teresa
- List of Holocaust memorials and museums in the United States
