= PSAC =

PSAC is an acronym that can represent:

- Pennsylvania State Athletic Conference, a college sports conference in the United States
- President's Science Advisory Committee, an advising body to the U.S. President from Truman to Nixon
- Public Service Alliance of Canada, a Canadian labour union
- Pugets Sound Agricultural Company, a subsidiary of the Hudson's Bay Company
