= Cowlitz Prairie =

Prairie in Washington, United States

- Prairie
- Interactive map of Cowlitz Prairie
- Coordinates: 46°28′43″N 122°48′26″W
- Location: Near Toledo, Washington in Lewis County
- Water bodies: Cowlitz River
- Etymology: Cowlitz people

Area
  - Total: 6,000 acres (2,400 ha) (approx)

Dimensions
  - Length: up to 6 miles (9.7 km)
  - Width: up to 2 miles (3.2 km)

Cowlitz Prairie is a natural prairie located in Lewis County, Washington, United States. The landform is located along the Cowlitz River and encompasses approximately 6,000 acres (2,400 ha) north of Toledo The Lower Cowlitz tribal group's traditional territory includes Cowlitz Prairie.

The geographical area holds numerous historical locations, including Simon Plamondon's original settlement, the Hudson's Bay Company's Cowlitz Farm, and the first established Catholic mission in Washington state, the Saint Francis Xavier Mission. The prairie was home to Cowlitz Landing, a site used as the first convention to begin the creation of the Washington Territory.

The landform has been of use as a settlement area for various Native American tribes. After non-indigenous claims were first established in the early 19th century, farming and fur trapping became economic factors throughout Cowlitz Prairie. Native people were forced out under decrees by the middle of the century and the existing settlement in the prairie evolved into an early Pacific Northwest mixed ancestry community, sometimes referred as a French Canadian or a Métis settlement.

== Geography ==
The landform is roughly situated along the west side of the Cowlitz River, spanning north of Toledo, east of Interstate 5 in Washington, and South of U.S. Route 12. Early 19th century visitors noticed an area mainly cleared of trees and assessed its dimensions from 4 to 6 miles long, 1 to 2 miles wide, adding up to nearly 6,000 acres (2,400 ha).

== History ==
The Cowlitz River, along with a direct portage to Puget Sound near Cowlitz Prairie, have been used throughout history by various regional Indigenous groups. The first non-indigenous person to venture as far as Cowlitz Prairie was Simon Plamondon in 1819 for the North West Company (NWC). He returned a year later with two others. The first Hudson's Bay Company (HBC) expedition to travel through the area was led by James McMillan in 1824; the expedition was on its way to Fraser River. HBC official George Simpson has been incorrectly credited in the past as the first European to travel through the landform.

Simon Plamondon, now associated with the HBC, married the daughter of a Cowlitz tribe leader and built the first cabin in the early 1830s with permission to settle near the tribe. By 1833, Plamondon and François Faignant were successful subsistence farmers soon joined by Joseph Rochbrune and Michel Coutenoir, after also having gained permissions. By 1838, the HBC had permission to set up its Fort Cowlitz, also known as Cowlitz Farm, on 3,000 acres (1,200 ha); the farm was nearly half of the prairie area.

By 1841, the Wilkes expedition reported that a Catholic priest, belonging to the Columbia Missionary, had established a following among the small community which consisted of six Canadian settlers. The settlers married native people and "half-breeds”. About two dozen workmen were attending the farm sheep and cattle, including some local natives. By 1843, sixty-four people and thirteen families formed the settlement. Retired Canadian fur traders with Cree, Ojibwe, Nipissing, Abenaki, and Iroquois ancestry continued to settle and marry into the local Cowlitz and Chinook tribes. The community evolved into a heterogeneous Métis village of log cabins and Indian camps scattered over the remaining acres in the prairie.

The HBC had also started to head north of the prairie border in 1846. Twenty early settlers were installed by 1850s by which time the Cowlitz Farm was ramping down after the expiry of the Russian-American Company HBC contract. Following various Indigenous uprisings throughout the Territory of Washington and escalating pressure from settlers arriving through the Oregon Trail, the first territorial Governor ordered in 1855 that the Cowlitz and Chinook tribal members were to clear out of their homelands. Some refused and found shelter in the settlement. In addition, exclusionary laws limiting land claims made it difficult to secure acreage and parcels as Americans were also filing claims; squatters who were previously allowed on the lands were displaced. The community continued as a close-knit, French-speaking Catholic settlement under an influx of newcomers attracted by the community's appeal. Into the 20th century, many inhabitants of Cowlitz Prairie and surrounding communities continued to speak the Cowlitz Salishan language and French, supplemented by the Chinook Wawa.

== Historical sites ==
Cowlitz Prairie is home to numerous historical locations, such as Simon Plamondon's original property that he settled after being adopted by the Lower Cowlitz people in 1826. Other sites include the Hudson's Bay Company Cowlitz Farm and the Saint Francis Xavier Mission; both were constructed by 1839. The mission was the first Catholic mission in the state. Cowlitz Landing, an early settlement, was located in the prairie. The town, in 1851, hosted the first convention that led to the creation of the Washington Territory.

== See also ==
- List of geographic features in Lewis County, Washington
