= Galvin =

Galvin may refer to:

- Galvin (surname)
- Galvin, Washington, U.S.
- Galvin railway station, Melbourne, Australia
- Galvin Manufacturing Corporation, later renamed Motorola

== See also ==
- Luigi Galvani, Italian physician and physicist
  - Galvanism, a muscle contraction stimulated by an electric current
