= Saint Urban, Washington =

Unincorporated community in Washington, United States

- Unincorporated community
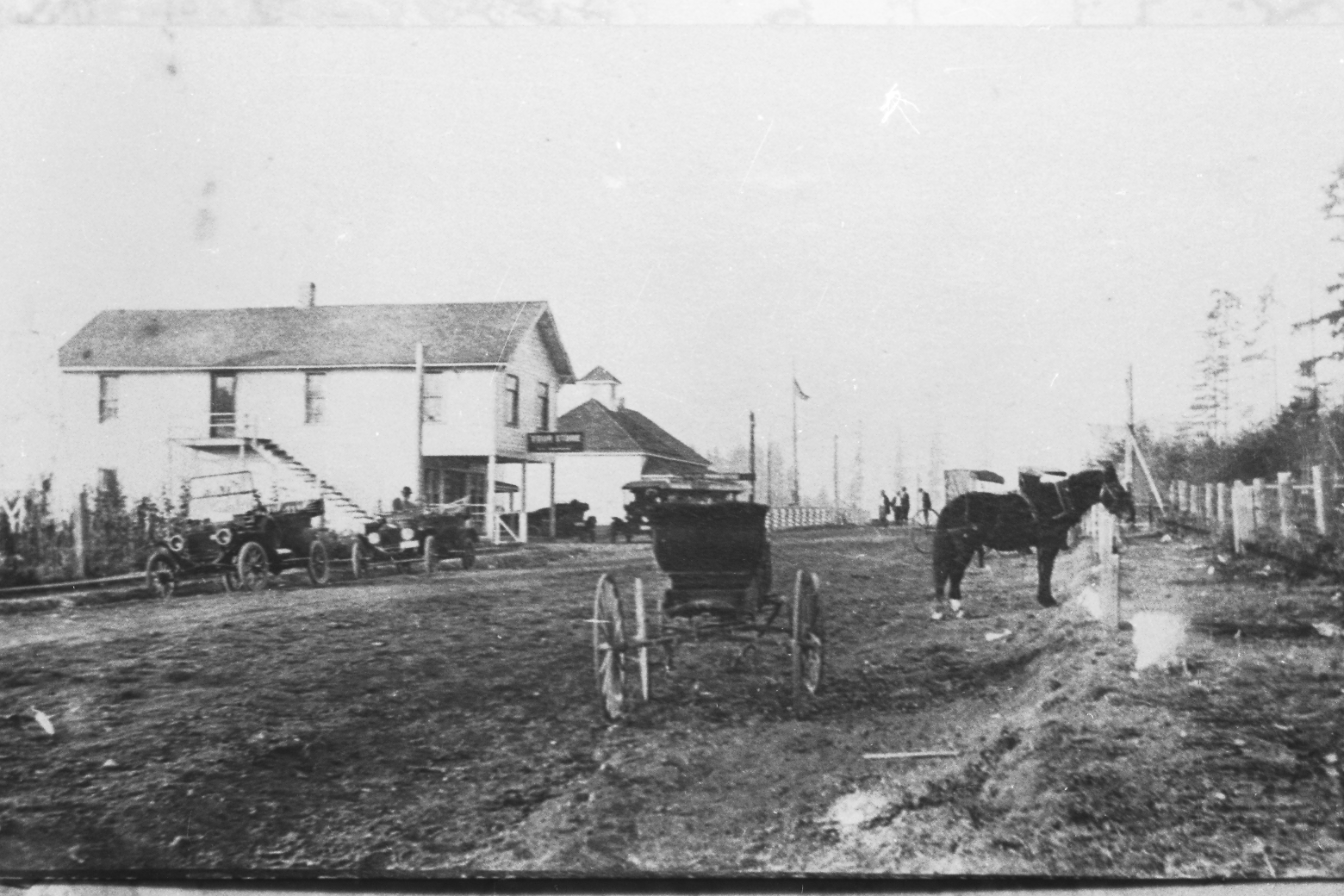
- Saint Urban, c. 1915

- Location within Washington (state) Location within the United States
- Coordinates: 46°31′05″N 122°53′13″W
- Country: United States
- State: Washington
- County: Lewis
- GNIS feature ID: 1504954

Saint Urban is an unincorporated community in Lewis County, Washington, United States. The community is located approximately three miles (4.8 km) northeast of Winlock and is known for the St. Urban Church, a historic house of worship built in the late 19th century.

== History ==
The town's existence began as two families, who were German and Swiss immigrants, settled the area in approximately 1889. They named the new community after a small village of the same name in Switzerland. The central hub of the community was located at the intersection of Military Road and Sargent Road and at its height of prosperity, consisted of a small store, a Catholic church, a school and a Grange hall. As of 2025, only the Grange hall and church remain.

== Historic buildings and sites ==
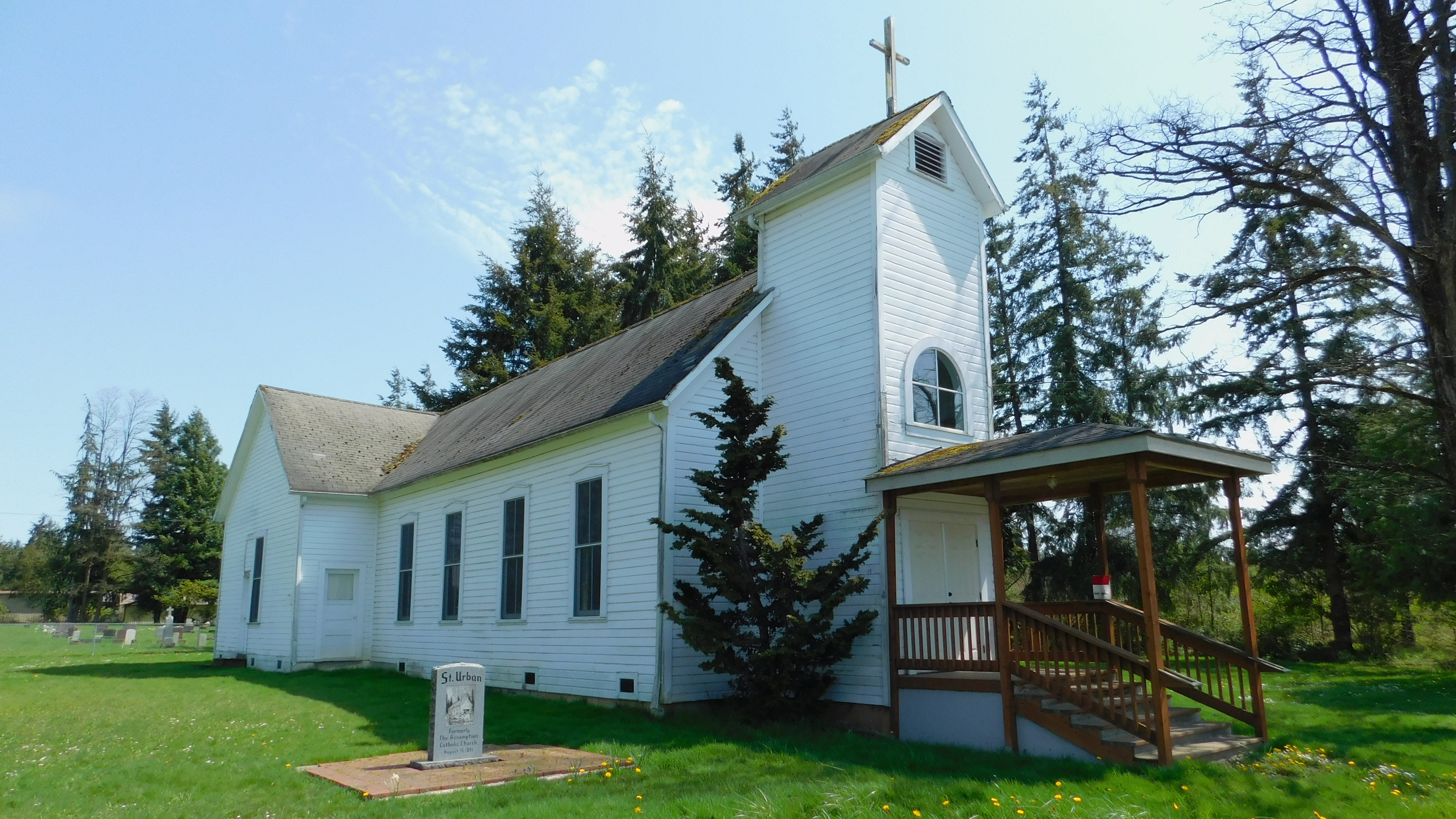
Saint Urban Church, 2022

The St. Urban Church, originally called the Assumption Catholic Church and also known as the Our Lady of the Assumption Church, was constructed in 1884 and dedicated on August 15, 1891, the day of the Feast of the Assumption. The span between construction and consecration was due to difficulties for Catholic priests in reaching the community. A cemetery was created and the structure has remained true to its original footprint and features, though the bell tower at the façade was once more ornate. The belfry was replaced during an early remodel that also included a small addition to the back of the building and a new entrance portico. A second remodel lowered the height of the tower and the annex was expanded. (Note: The dates of the two renovation projects of St. Urban Church were mentioned in the source as being unknown.)

The congregation was under the parish of Saint Francis Xavier Mission until 1971. The church was considered for demolition in 1974 due to maintenance costs and an already existing Catholic church in Winlock; a final liturgical service was held in September 1974. The structure remained but by the early 2000s the church building had become dilapidated and had been decommissioned, though the cemetery was still maintained. The Archdiocese of Seattle contemplated destroying the building. A group of former residents and their descendants, concerned about the loss of a historic landmark, formed the St. Urban Settlement Foundation in an effort to save the church. Volunteers worked towards the restoration effort that culminated in the reopening of the building with a ceremony on August 15, 2010. The church is considered the first, and last, original public building of the early St. Urban community.

== Education ==
St. Urban School Interior, c. 1915

The first school in St. Urban was built on property owned by Frederick Schlittler, approximately one-quarter mile (0.40 km) north of the main intersection of the town. A new school district, 37, was assigned on January 8, 1884. The original school was replaced with a somewhat larger building, c. 1908, and was located diagonally across the St. Urban intersection from the church.
