= Bremer, Washington =

Unincorporated community in Washington, United States

- Unincorporated community
- Location within Washington (state) Location within the United States
- Coordinates: 46°34′42.39″N 122°24′54.40″W
- Country: United States
- State: Washington
- County: Lewis
- Established: 1890
- Time zone: UTC-8 (Pacific (PST))
  - Summer (DST): UTC-7 (PDT)
- Area code(s): 360, 564
- GNIS feature ID: 1516929

Bremer is an unincorporated community in Lewis County, Washington, United States.

== History ==
A post office called Bremer was established in 1890, and remained in operation until 1923.
