= Toledo, Washington =

City in Lewis County, Washington

- City
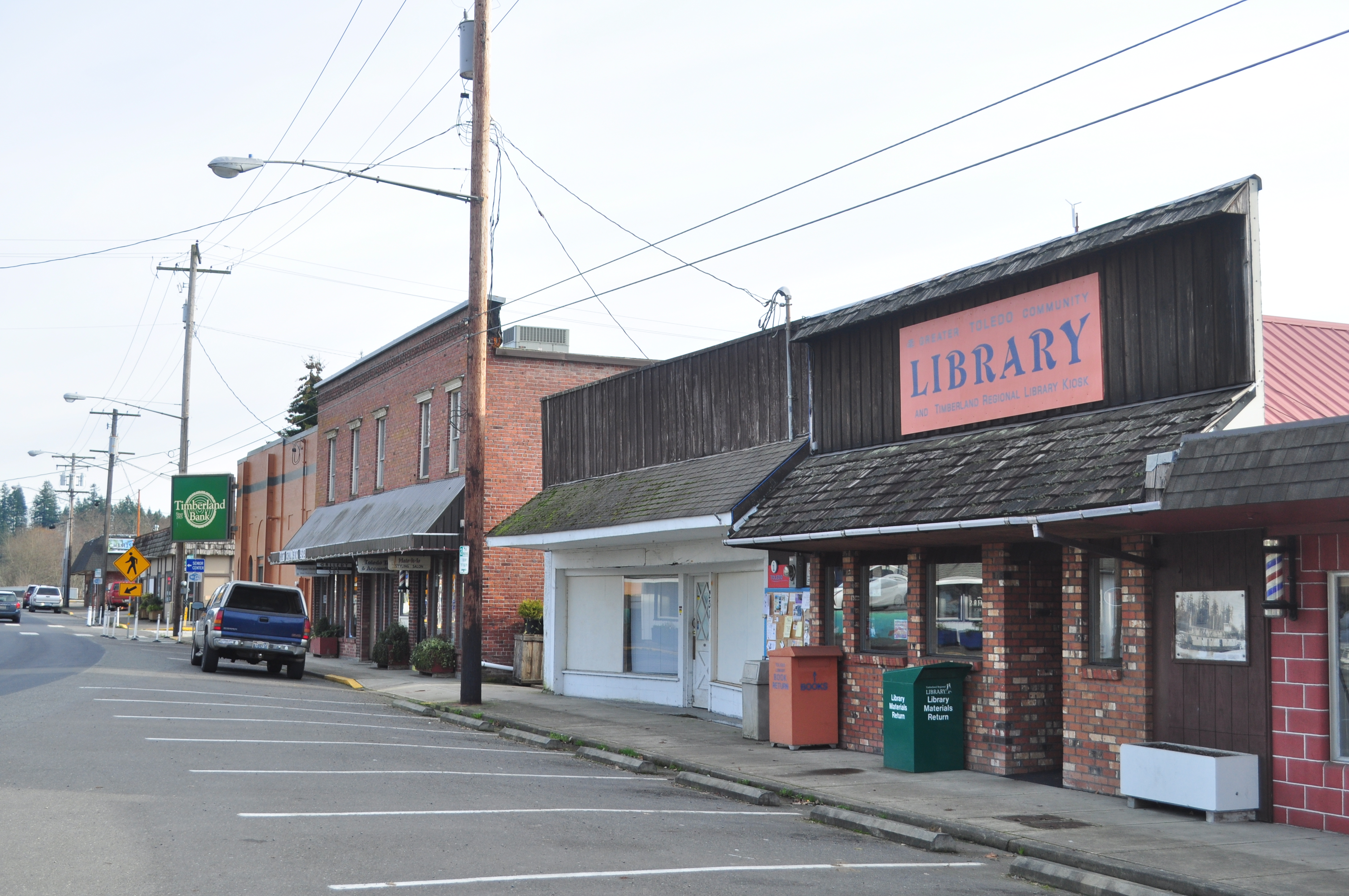
- Shops on Cowlitz Street, Toledo, Washington (2019)
- Nickname: Gateway to Mount St. Helens
- Location of Toledo, Washington
- Coordinates: 46°26′29″N 122°50′59″W
- Country: United States
- State: Washington
- County: Lewis

Government
  - Type: Mayor–council
  - Mayor: Cherie Devore

Area
  - Total: 0.40 sq mi (1.03 km^{2})
  - Land: 0.39 sq mi (1.02 km^{2})
  - Water: 0.0039 sq mi (0.01 km^{2})
- Elevation: 144 ft (44 m)

Population (2020)
  - Total: 631
  - Density: 1,956.9/sq mi (755.55/km^{2})
- Time zone: UTC-8 (Pacific (PST))
  - Summer (DST): UTC-7 (PDT)
- ZIP Code: 98591
- Area code(s): 360, 564
- FIPS code: 53-71785
- GNIS feature ID: 2412077
- Website: ToledoWA.US

Toledo is a city in Lewis County, Washington, United States. The community is situated on the Cowlitz River.

Named after a paddle steamer, Toledo began out of pioneer settlement, the Cowlitz Farm, and the beginnings of several ports known as Plomondon's Landing, Warbassport, and Cowlitz Landing. The community incorporated in 1892.

Toledo is home to an annual Cheese Days festival that celebrates the town's dairy history and the New Year's Eve Giant Cheese Ball Drop. In addition to nearby Gospodor Monument Park and Saint Francis Xavier Mission, several small parks and Ed Carlson Memorial Field are located in the city.

== Etymology ==
The area underwent several names during its beginnings, including Plomondon's Landing, Warbassport, and Cowlitz Landing, changing roughly once a decade during the mid-1800s.

An accepted version of how the moniker of Toledo was chosen includes that of Celeste Rochon, an early settler of Chinook heritage, who in either the late 1870s or early 1880s, named the town after a pioneer side wheel paddle steamer that she saw outside a window. The steamer was operated by Captain Oren Kellogg of the Kellogg Transportation Company, who offered Rochon the honor to name the town. A differing account mentions that the name was chosen by the company after its own vessel. The steamer first began traveling the Cowlitz River in 1879 and was named after Toledo, Ohio.

Due to the community's location on Spirit Lake Memorial Highway, Toledo is known as the "Gateway to Mt. St. Helens".

== History ==
=== Indigenous history ===
The lands and Cowlitz River in and near present-day Toledo were once used by the Cowlitz people and other indigenous tribes as a means for sustenance, including fishing the waters, and as a transportation vector.

=== Settlement ===
Simon Plomondon (or Plamondon), an employee of the Hudson Bay Company, settled in the area in 1820, taking up a donation land claim, marrying a Cowlitz Chief Schanewah's daughter, Thas-e-muth (Veronica). Plomondon became the first white man to settle in what would later be known as Southwest Washington. The couple's first child was born in what would become Toledo in 1821.

The Pugets Sound Agricultural Company opened and maintained the Cowlitz Farm in 1838-1839. The Saint Francis Xavier Mission, the first Catholic mission in the Washington Territory, was established in 1838. In the mid-1850s during the Puget Sound War, volunteers constructed a blockhouse at Cowlitz Landing amid fears of potential Native American attacks; no combat at the fort took place.

Edward D. Warbass began a port in the area after purchasing a claim in July 1850. The following year he established a post office known as Warbassport and served as a Lewis County treasurer and auditor for several years. Another settlement known as Cowlitz Landing was formed adjacent to the new port by Joshua Tibeau; the landing was found necessary after passengers of the river began disembarking during their journeys around the area. The landing was approximately 1.25 miles (2.01 km) southwest of present-day Toledo. Tibeau did not officially file a homestead claim and was forced to sell his properties in 1854 to a judge, Christopher Pagett, who submitted a proper claim on the land. His claim was recognized in early 1866 and he sold it in April for $250, equivalent to $5,497 in 2025.

Afterwards, Warbassport and Cowlitz Landing merged, remaining known under the landing moniker. The first steamships began navigating the Cowlitz River near the landing and port in 1861. Another community was begun across from Cowlitz Landing in the 1860s. Known as East Toledo or Eadonia, residents of both towns crossed the river by canoe; a ferry was established in 1883.

Pagett reacquired the claim in 1871, selling it again in 1873 for $800, equivalent to $21,500 in 2025, to settler Augustus Rochon. The town was platted for the first time by Rochon, laying out three blocks in 1879. The first Toledo post office was established on November 30, 1880.

The Cowlitz River changed course, eventually removing any remaining signs of the early community, and a new landing was established at the Tokul Creek junction. In 1879, Captain Oren Kellogg, of J. Kellogg and Company Steamship Lines, decided the area was conducive for a town and began to purchase lands with that intent. His first acquisition was in 1881, buying a 1-acre (0.40 ha) parcel from Rochon; Kellogg built a dock and warehouse. The company bought the town in its entirety in 1886 for a total cost of $2,350, equivalent to $84,208 in 2025. In 1892, a wagon bridge was constructed across the river, connecting East Toledo and the town; businesses from Eadonia migrated to Toledo.

Toledo was officially incorporated on October 1, 1892; the first mayor was Robert Stopper, a Lewis County commissioner and shoemaker. The community voted 39 in favor of incorporation and 12 were opposed. The following year, the new city council established a jail and created positions for a clerk and marshal. By the end of the century, the city had grown to include two general stores, multiple factories and plants, several hotels and saloons, and various shops, including those for blacksmithing and millinery.

=== 20th century ===
Growth of the city continued into the 20th century with the introduction of several modern conveniences of the time, including kerosene street lamps and fire hydrants. A fire department was established in 1904 and the first bank, Toledo State Bank, was formed. Telephone service, in 1906, and electricity, in 1911, followed and the town population was recorded to include 650 people in 1910.

Flooding in the community was a standard concern, including back-to-back inundations in 1908 and 1909. A steel bridge over the Cowlitz River was constructed and opened in 1920 after a flood washed out a previous concrete crossing the prior year.

Interstate 5 (I-5) bypassed Toledo when it was built in the 1950s. The highway crossed the Cowlitz approximately 2 miles (3.2 km) north of the city.

=== 21st century ===
With growing concerns for Toledo's economic and residential future, a volunteer project known as "Vision:Toledo", was begun in 2011. Renovations to the downtown core were implemented, which included new murals and public art, and the group helped to institute broadband installations, among other efforts, to improve the economic conditions of the city.

In Toledo's preparation to celebrate the United States Semiquincentennial in 2026, the first known photograph of Celeste Rochon had been discovered, obtained from her descendants. Due to a lack of a photo, the city had been unable to properly recognize Rochon's historical status. The picture was added to a banner and is to be displayed at Toledo City Hall as part of the 250th anniversary celebration.

== Geography ==
According to the United States Census Bureau, the city has a total area of 0.40 square miles (1.04 km^{2}), all of it land.

=== Climate ===
According to the Köppen Climate Classification system, Toledo has a warm-summer Mediterranean climate, abbreviated "Csb" on climate maps.

Climate data for Toledo
Month	Jan	Feb	Mar	Apr	May	Jun	Jul	Aug	Sep	Oct	Nov	Dec	Year
Record high °F (°C)	62 (17)	72 (22)	80 (27)	89 (32)	93 (34)	97 (36)	102 (39)	104 (40)	100 (38)	96 (36)	71 (22)	62 (17)	104 (40)
Mean daily maximum °F (°C)	45.3 (7.4)	50.8 (10.4)	55.5 (13.1)	60.4 (15.8)	67 (19)	72.4 (22.4)	78 (26)	78.8 (26.0)	74.1 (23.4)	62.9 (17.2)	51.1 (10.6)	44.9 (7.2)	61.8 (16.6)
Mean daily minimum °F (°C)	33.2 (0.7)	34.1 (1.2)	36.3 (2.4)	39 (4)	43.7 (6.5)	48.2 (9.0)	50.4 (10.2)	50 (10)	46 (8)	41.1 (5.1)	37.7 (3.2)	34.2 (1.2)	41.2 (5.1)
Record low °F (°C)	0 (−18)	3 (−16)	12 (−11)	23 (−5)	26 (−3)	31 (−1)	31 (−1)	31 (−1)	25 (−4)	16 (−9)	3 (−16)	−2 (−19)	−2 (−19)
Average precipitation inches (mm)	6.93 (176)	5.04 (128)	4.8 (120)	3.16 (80)	2.29 (58)	2 (51)	0.74 (19)	1.43 (36)	2.31 (59)	3.73 (95)	6.33 (161)	6.91 (176)	45.66 (1,160)
Average snowfall inches (cm)	1.9 (4.8)	0.4 (1.0)	0.8 (2.0)	0 (0)	0 (0)	0 (0)	0 (0)	0 (0)	0 (0)	0 (0)	0.5 (1.3)	0.8 (2.0)	4.4 (11)
Average precipitation days (≥ 0.01 inch)	20	17	19	15	12	10	5	7	10	14	19	21	169

== Demographics ==
Historical population
Census	Pop.	Note	%±
1890	276		—
1900	285		3.3%
1910	375		31.6%
1920	324		−13.6%
1930	530		63.6%
1940	523		−1.3%
1950	602		15.1%
1960	499		−17.1%
1970	654		31.1%
1980	637		−2.6%
1990	586		−8.0%
2000	653		11.4%
2010	725		11.0%
2020	631		−13.0%
U.S. Decennial Census; 2020 Census

=== 2020 census ===
As of the 2020 census, Toledo had a population of 631. The median age was 41.1 years. 22.2% of residents were under the age of 18 and 20.4% of residents were 65 years of age or older. For every 100 females there were 79.3 males, and for every 100 females age 18 and over there were 81.2 males age 18 and over.

0.0% of residents lived in urban areas, while 100.0% lived in rural areas.

There were 258 households in Toledo, of which 31.0% had children under the age of 18 living in them. Of all households, 40.3% were married-couple households, 17.8% were households with a male householder and no spouse or partner present, and 30.6% were households with a female householder and no spouse or partner present. About 31.0% of all households were made up of individuals and 14.7% had someone living alone who was 65 years of age or older.

There were 302 housing units, of which 14.6% were vacant. The homeowner vacancy rate was 7.9% and the rental vacancy rate was 6.3%.

Racial composition as of the 2020 census
Race	Number	Percent
White	527	83.5%
Black or African American	7	1.1%
American Indian and Alaska Native	21	3.3%
Asian	3	0.5%
Native Hawaiian and Other Pacific Islander	0	0.0%
Some other race	19	3.0%
Two or more races	54	8.6%
Hispanic or Latino (of any race)	60	9.5%

=== 2010 census ===
As of the 2010 census, there were 725 people, 274 households, and 199 families residing in the city. The population density was 1,812.5 inhabitants per square mile (699.8/km^{2}). There were 304 housing units at an average density of 760.0 per square mile (293.4/km^{2}). The racial makeup of the city was 91.0% White, 2.6% Native American, 0.8% Asian, 0.3% Pacific Islander, 2.3% from other races, and 2.9% from two or more races. Hispanic or Latino of any race were 7.0% of the population.

There were 274 households, of which 42.0% had children under the age of 18 living with them, 45.3% were married couples living together, 20.8% had a female householder with no husband present, 6.6% had a male householder with no wife present, and 27.4% were non-families. 22.6% of all households were made up of individuals, and 13.1% had someone living alone who was 65 years of age or older. The average household size was 2.65 and the average family size was 3.04.

The median age in the city was 35.2 years. 28.4% of residents were under the age of 18; 11.4% were between the ages of 18 and 24; 22% were from 25 to 44; 24% were from 45 to 64; and 14.1% were 65 years of age or older. The gender makeup of the city was 46.6% male and 53.4% female.

=== 2000 census ===
As of the 2000 census, there were 653 people, 265 households, and 182 families residing in the city. The population density was 1,947.3 people per square mile (741.5/km^{2}). There were 283 housing units at an average density of 843.9 per square mile (321.4/km^{2}). The racial makeup of the city was 93.26% White, 0.61% African American, 2.30% Native American, 0.31% Asian, 1.53% from other races, and 1.99% from two or more races. Hispanic or Latino of any race were 4.90% of the population. 18.9% were of American, 13.7% German, 9.9% Irish, 8.0% English and 5.7% Dutch ancestry. 97.5% spoke English and 2.5% Spanish as their first language.

There were 265 households, out of which 32.8% had children under the age of 18 living with them, 51.3% were married couples living together, 12.8% had a female householder with no husband present, and 31.3% were non-families. 28.7% of all households were made up of individuals, and 16.2% had someone living alone who was 65 years of age or older. The average household size was 2.46 and the average family size was 2.95.

In the city, the population was spread out, with 25.7% under the age of 18, 10.7% from 18 to 24, 24.3% from 25 to 44, 22.1% from 45 to 64, and 17.2% who were 65 years of age or older. The median age was 37 years. For every 100 females, there were 85.5 males. For every 100 females age 18 and over, there were 83.7 males.

The median income for a household in the city was $29,271, and the median income for a family was $31,833. Males had a median income of $28,750 versus $19,271 for females. The per capita income for the city was $14,483. About 9.3% of families and 14.7% of the population were below the poverty line, including 21.6% of those under age 18 and 3.8% of those age 65 or over.

== Arts and culture ==
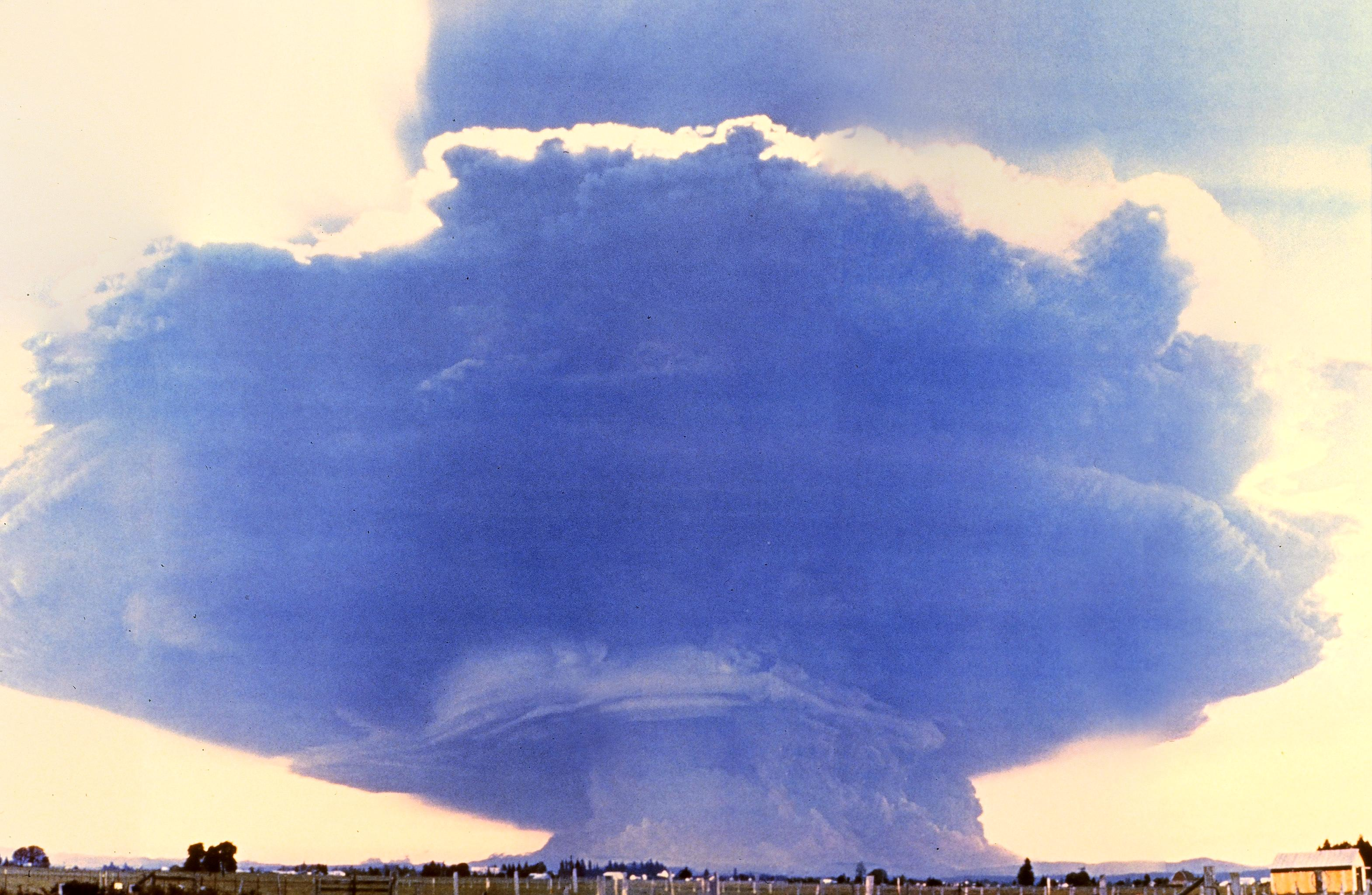
The eruption column produced by the 1980 eruption of Mount St. Helens as seen from Toledo, which lies 35 mi (56 km) to the northeast of Mount St. Helens. The cloud was roughly 40 mi (64 km) wide and 15 mi (24 km; 79,000 ft) high.

The residents of Toledo hold an annual "Big Toledo Community Meeting", or known locally as the "Big Meeting", to discuss ideas and plans for future events, to be informed of current projects within the town, and to hear about updates by local community and charitable organizations. The meeting began in 2011 as a way to invigorate the town after a large fire devastated a downtown historic building. Festivals and celebrations, such as a Santa Quad Parade and the New Year's Eve Giant Cheese Ball Drop, which began in 2018, were developed based on proposals from the meeting.

=== Festivals and events ===
Toledo celebrates the city's dairy farming history by hosting an annual Cheese Days festival, usually held in July. The festival began after the opening of a new cheese processing plant in 1919. A fire in 1945 decimated the factory but the yearly ceremonies continued. In 2021, the festival observed the 100th occasion that the event had been held, and it has continued to honor the tradition of providing cheese sandwiches that were first offered at the inaugural Cheese Days celebration. Since 1985, the festival has a grand marshal, titled as the Big Cheese, bestowed to an older and long-term resident of the community as an honor in recognition for their volunteer efforts.

The Mt. St. Helens Bluegrass Festival is held annually in the city and features performances from bluegrass musicians from around the United States, including Appalachia and the Pacific Northwest. The festival is also known for its bluegrass quilting room. First debuting in 1984, the weekend event is usually held in August.

=== Historic buildings and sites ===
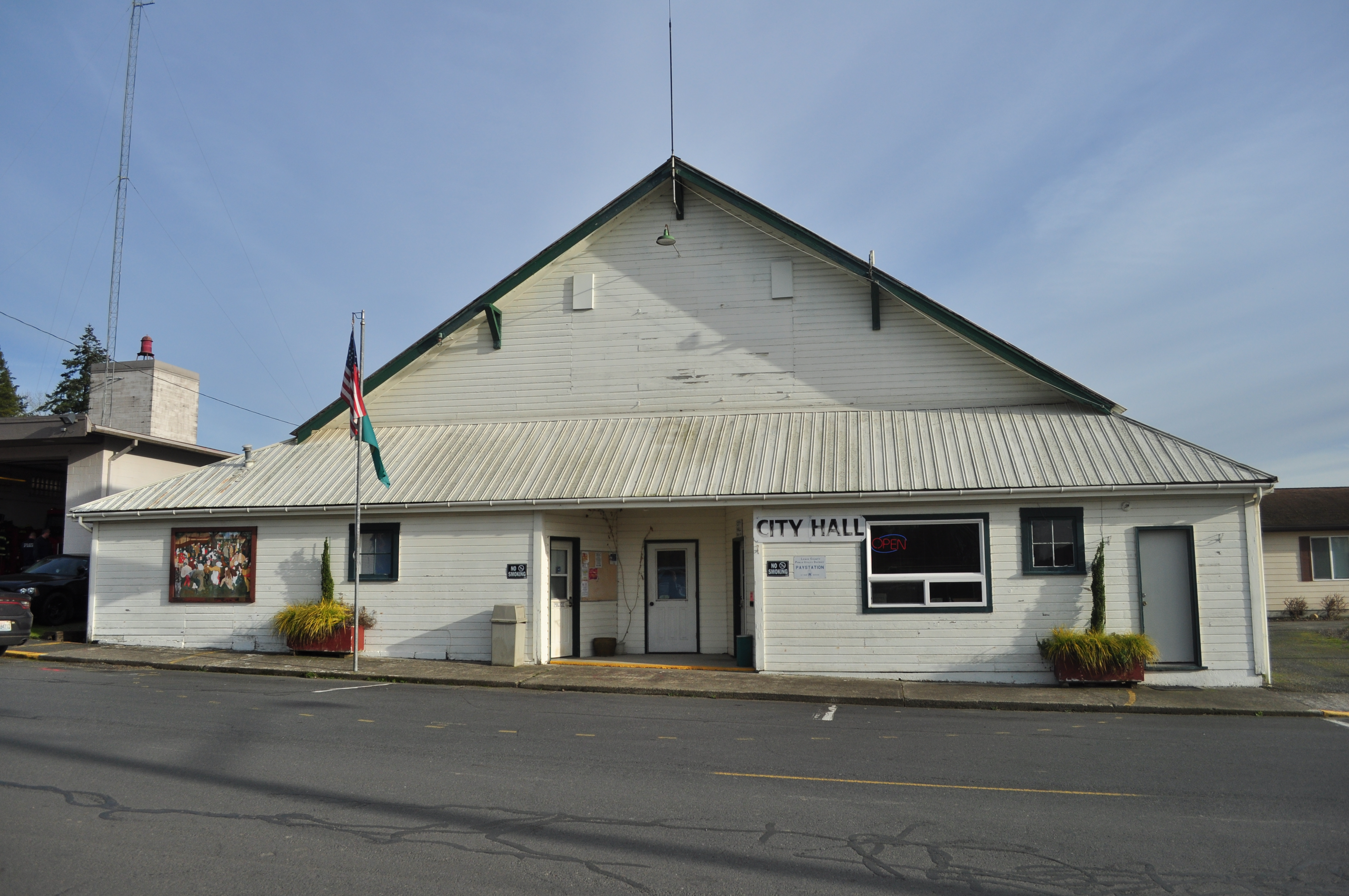
Toledo City Hall, 2019

The Harmony Hill barn, constructed in 1948, is listed on the Washington State Heritage Barn Register.

=== Tourism ===
Gospodor Monument Park, a now closed but roadside-attraction park, is near the city and is viewable from I-5. The park consists of sculptures on tall plinths and smaller memorials.

== Parks and recreation ==
South of Toledo and across the Cowlitz River sits the South County Regional Park which provides access for boating and other activities around Wallace Pond.

Kemp Olson Memorial Park is the city's main park and is named after a long-time fire chief in the community. The park contains a Veterans Wall of Honor, built in 2012, that honors Toledo residents who served in the military. Made up of approximately 400 memorial bricks, a brick was added in 2025 to honor all veterans of the Cowlitz Indian Tribe. A pocket park known as Steamboat Alley features a mural of a steamer, honoring the riverboat history of Toledo.

== Economy ==
Toledo's early economy was based on dairy farming and the production of cheese. Due to the loss of the town's remaining dairy factory in 1945 by fire, cheese production ceased. Farming was a main economic factor with crops such as potatoes, and wheat, and livestock such as cattle and poultry. Farmers attempted to grow hops around the turn of the 20th century but the crops often failed due to disease; the efforts ended with the beginning of the Prohibition era.

The creation of three port authorities in Lewis County, in an attempt to overcome stagflation in the region, was begun in 1986. The Port of Centralia and Port of Chehalis were established, but the third measure to created a port between Toledo and Winlock failed after a public vote. The failed attempt was thought to be due to the area's rural location and more resilient economy during the time period.

== Politics ==
Presidential Elections Results
Year	Republican	Democratic	Third parties
2008	54.5% 145	42.5% 113	3.0% 8
2012	50.8% 127	46.4% 116	2.8% 7
2016	56.8% 158	33.8% 94	9.4% 26
2020	59.5% 201	35.8% 121	4.4% 15
2024	61.3% 225	33.2% 122	5.4% 20

=== Government ===
Toledo institutes a five-person city council that oversees economic and legislative matters, and an elected mayor that maintains daily oversight of the city and government staff.

=== Voting ===
The 2020 election included votes for candidates of the Libertarian Party. In the 2024 election, there were 3 votes cast for write-in candidates and 9 votes were tallied for Robert F. Kennedy Jr..

== Education ==
Public education is provided by the Toledo School District, which serves both the City of Toledo and surrounding population. Campuses for students in elementary, middle, and high school are named after the city.

The first school in Toledo was called the OK School. It was a one-room schoolhouse. Most of the kids that lived out of the town limits had to ride a boat across the river to and from school until the bridge was built. The school district consolidated 33 separate one-room schools in 1922. The school system mascot was the "Indians", a moniker that would exist for a century. The current middle school was originally the high school until the new high school was built in 1974. While the middle school was being remodeled in 1995, the children were relocated for the year to St. Mary's Church and School.

St. Mary's Academy, begun in 1920, was a private-school for girls and began on the site of the Saint Francis Xavier Mission that first began in 1838. Despite large enrollment and funding figures in the 1960s, St. Mary's shuttered in June 1973 after severe loss of registrations due to negative economic conditions in the region.

The Class of 1988 commissioned a totem pole from a chainsaw artist. This pole was presented to the high school by the class and continues to grace the front entrance. Since 1922, the school has used the "Indian" as the School's mascot. The Cowlitz Indian Tribe officially endorsed this mascot by Tribal Council action in February 2019. Artwork in the high school includes two Remington bronzes, an oil portrait of David Ike, last full-blooded Cowlitz Indian and several carvings by indigenous artists. Gary Ike, a long-time supporter of the school and its programs, is honored throughout the school and athletic venues in thanks for his many years of service to the school and community.

In November 2018, the community voted to build a new high school. Using funds from a special state grant and School Construction Assistance Program (SCAP) funding from the Office of Superintendent of Public Instruction, the upgraded high school was constructed on the site of the existing school. Expansive construction of the new Toledo High School began in February 2020 and opened in autumn 2021. The school is built around the original gymnasium and features artwork honoring the Cowlitz Indian Tribe. The $25 million construction project was completed in April 2022 followed by a ribbon cutting ceremony, unveilings of Native American artworks, and a performance by the Cowlitz Indian Tribe Drum Group.

In 2021, the school district, required by a Washington state law banning Native American mascots and imagery enacted that year, changed its nickname to the Riverhawks.

=== Sports ===
The Toledo boys' baseball team won the 2B state title in 2016.

== Media ==
Early newspapers in Toledo included the Cowlitz River Pilot, begun in 1886 by Frank Owens, and the Toledo Tidings.

== Infrastructure ==
Toledo is bisected by State Route 505, which provides the shortest route to access Mount St. Helens National Volcanic Monument for southbound visitors.

Approximately 4.0 miles (6.4 km) north of Toledo is the South Lewis County Airport. Also known as Ed Carlson Memorial Field, the airfield is county owned but managed by a local commission.

== Notable people ==
- Ethan Siegel, theoretical astrophysicist and science author
