= Bunker, Washington =

Unincorporated community in Washington, United States

- Unincorporated community
- Location within Washington (state) Location within the United States
- Coordinates: 46°38′39.37″N 123°6′59.49″W
- Country: United States
- State: Washington
- County: Lewis
- Established: 1913
- Time zone: UTC-8 (Pacific (PST))
  - Summer (DST): UTC-7 (PDT)
- Area code(s): 360, 564
- GNIS feature ID: 1510847

Bunker is an unincorporated community in Lewis County, Washington, United States.

== History ==
Bunker, also known as the community of Bunker Creek and previously known as Eagleton, was located approximately 15 miles (24 km) west of Chehalis and was named after an early settler family to the area, the John Bunker family. The community was founded soon after the creation of Lewis County and the town grew out of a logging camp after several timber mills of various use were built in Bunker. The timber industry in the area began to wane and reached its end by the early 1920s.

The town received their mail under the Eagleton post office for a brief time and a post office for Bunker was established in 1913; it remained in operation until 1921.
