= Lewis County, Washington =

County in Washington, United States

- County
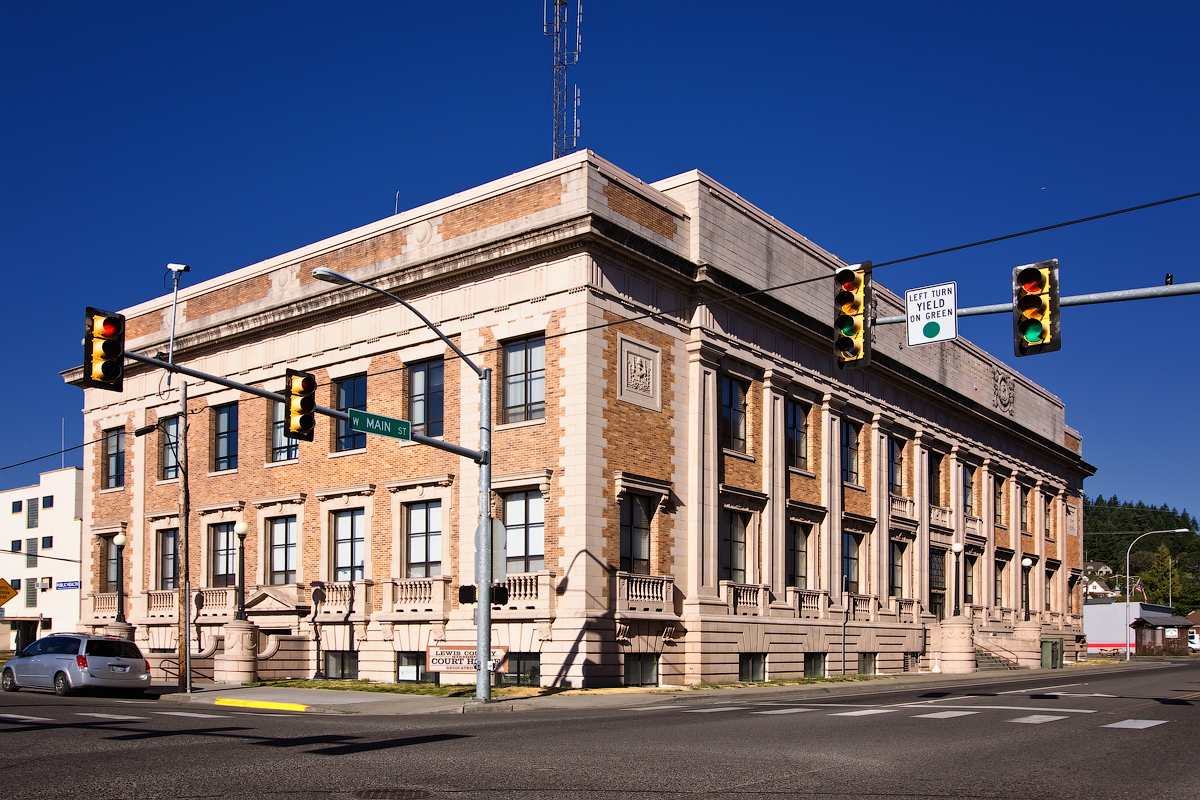
- Lewis County Historic Courthouse

- Location within the U.S. state of Washington
- Coordinates: 46°35′N 122°24′W
- Country: United States
- State: Washington
- Founded: December 19, 1845
- Named for: Meriwether Lewis
- Seat: Chehalis
- Largest city: Centralia

Area
  - Total: 2,436 sq mi (6,310 km^{2})
  - Land: 2,403 sq mi (6,220 km^{2})
  - Water: 33 sq mi (85 km^{2}) 1.4%

Population (2020)
  - Total: 82,149
  - Estimate (2025): 88,062 ▲
  - Density: 34.19/sq mi (13.20/km^{2})
- Time zone: UTC−8 (Pacific)
  - Summer (DST): UTC−7 (PDT)
- Congressional district: 3rd
- Website: lewiscountywa.gov

Lewis County is a county in the U.S. state of Washington. As of the 2020 census, the county's population was 82,149. The county seat is Chehalis, and its largest city is Centralia. Lewis County comprises the Centralia, WA Micropolitan Statistical Area, which is also included in the Seattle-Tacoma, WA Combined Statistical Area.

== History ==
=== Indigenous history ===
Native American tribes that lived in the area were primarily the Upper Chehalis people and the Meshall. The tribes usually lived in villages located near rivers, including the Chehalis and the Skookumchuck, as well as streams or tributaries such as Lincoln Creek and Scatter Creek. A large community was located at Grand Mound.

The indigenous harvested berries, nuts, and tubers from nearby prairies and forests, and gathered migrating salmon from the waters. The Meshall used horses to trade with other native communities east of the Cascade Mountains.

The Chehalis refused to sign the Quinault Treaty that required indigenous tribes in Southwest Washington to relinquish their rights to the land; the tribe has proclaimed rights as "affiliates" under the treaty. The Confederated Tribes of the Chehalis Reservation was created near Oakville in 1864. The population of the Chehalis people dropped from approximately 5,000 in 1855 to 1,200 in twenty years, due to the spread of several diseases.

=== Settlement and creation of Lewis County ===
Prior to the creation of Lewis County, French-Canadian settlers began homesteads on the Cowlitz Prairie in the 1820s and worked on farms, such as Cowlitz Farm, for the Hudson Bay Company. The earliest known settler was Simon Plomondon (Plamondon) who established a 640-acre (260 ha) land claim on the Cowlitz River in 1827. The community constructed a log cabin church, the first house of worship in what became the state of Washington; the church became known as Saint Francis Xavier Mission.

Cowlitz Farm was considered the first settlement in the area and crops and livestock were transported to other trading posts in the region. Goods, materials, and people traveled using the rivers, most notably at Cowlitz Landing, or via the Cowlitz Trail.

The county was created as Lewis County, in honor of Meriwether Lewis, on either December 19 or December 21, 1845, by the Provisional Government of Oregon, and was originally part of the Oregon Territory when it was officially formed in 1848. (Note: Other historical reports mention that Lewis County was so named in 1849 and may have been known prior to the change as Vancouver County.) At the time, the county included all U.S. lands north of the Cowlitz River, including much of the Puget Sound region and British Columbia. Despite the county being named for him, Meriwether Lewis never traveled in the present-day boundaries of Lewis County.

Ownership of land in the Oregon Territory was prohibited to Black Americans. Anna and James Cochrane purchased a land claim on the Skookumchuck River to circumvent the restriction, allowing their adopted son, George Washington, to occupy the land; the Cochranes sold the acreage to Washington when Lewis County became part of the Washington Territory in 1853, which did not include any restrictions against Black ownership. Washington went on to establish the town of Centerville in 1875, which was incorporated as Centralia in 1886.

Further settlements commenced, including the establishment of Saundersville in 1851, which was later renamed to Chehalis in 1879, and Warbassport, eventually known as Toledo. Exploration of the eastern portion of the county was led by William Packwood, who helped to install a road system that opened up mountain pass near Packwood and Naches Pass in the 1850s. Several blockhouses were built during the Puget Sound War but no known acts of violence connected to the war are recorded as occurring in the county.

Lewis County in the Washington Territory was smaller than its boundaries under Oregon and was officially formed to its present-day size, approximately 26 mi × 96 mi (42 km × 154 km), by act of the territorial legislature in 1854. The first known census recorded 616 people; the tally excluded indigenous people.

The first post office was established in 1854 at Cowlitz Landing. The first recognized court hearing in the Washington Territory was held in Lewis County at the John R. Jackson Courthouse, the oldest standing courthouse in Washington. The initial establishment of a county seat was Claquato in 1862.

Travel in the county relied on use of the rivers, tributaries, and difficult overland paths into the early 1870s. The Northern Pacific Railroad was constructed in the region in 1872 and the county connected between Kalama and Tacoma by January 1874. A depot was established in Saundersville, bypassing Newaukum and Claquato, allowing the Chehalis community to become the new county seat in August 1874.

=== 20th century ===
Population growth was "slow, but steady" at the beginning of the 20th century, increasing due to timber production and better travel. The county gained notoriety in 1919 due to the Centralia Tragedy, also known as the Centralia Massacre, and the economy suffered decline in the 1920s and 1930s, rebounding during World War II. The construction of dams and new highways, along with the discovery of large tracts of coal, led to further economic expansion and employment in the county during the mid-20th century.

Both eastern and western Lewis County experienced significant ash fall during the 1980 eruption of Mount St. Helens. The disastrous event led to the creation of three visitor centers and other tourism-related businesses in the county.

=== 21st century ===
The county received official recognition as a "Purple Heart County" in November 2019.

== Geography ==
Lewis County sits along the Interstate 5 corridor. Lewis shares a border with eight other counties. Clockwise from the top left, those are: Grays Harbor, Thurston, Pierce, Yakima, Skamania, Cowlitz, Wahkiakum, and Pacific counties.

According to the United States Census Bureau, the county has a total area of 2,436 square miles (6,310 km^{2}), of which 2,403 square miles (6,220 km^{2}) is land and 33 square miles (85 km^{2}) (1.4%) is water. One of the world's tallest Douglas fir trees was in the town of Mineral within Lewis County, attaining a height of 120 metres (390 ft).

=== Geographic features ===
- Cascade Mountains
- Chehalis River and three of its tributaries, the South Fork Chehalis River, Newaukum River, the Skookumchuck River, along with several major creeks including Centralia's China Creek.
- Cowlitz River and its tributaries, including the Ohanapecosh River, Cispus River, and Tilton River.
- Nisqually River
- Lake Mayfield
- Riffe Lake
- Big Horn, the highest point in Lewis county
- Boistfort Peak, the highest point in the Willapa Hills
- Walupt Creek Falls

=== Major highways ===
- Interstate 5
- U.S. Route 12
- State Route 6
- State Route 7

=== Adjacent counties ===
- Grays Harbor County – north/northwest
- Thurston County – north
- Pierce County – north/northeast
- Yakima County – east
- Skamania County – south/southeast
- Cowlitz County – south
- Wahkiakum County – south/southwest
- Pacific County – west

=== National protected areas ===
- Gifford Pinchot National Forest (part)
- Mount Baker-Snoqualmie National Forest (part)
- Mount Rainier National Park (part)
- Mount St. Helens National Volcanic Monument (part)
- Goat Rocks Wilderness (part)

== Communities ==
=== Cities ===
- Centralia
- Chehalis (county seat)
- Morton
- Mossyrock
- Napavine
- Toledo
- Vader
- Winlock

=== Town ===
- Pe Ell

=== Census-designated places ===
- Fords Prairie
- Mineral
- Onalaska
- Packwood

=== Unincorporated communities ===
- Adna
- Alpha
- Alta Vista
- Ajlune
- Boistfort
- Bunker
- Bremer
- Cinebar
- Curtis
- Doty
- Dryad
- Ethel
- Evaline
- Forest
- Galvin
- Glenoma
- Harmony
- Klaber
- Lacamas
- Littell
- Mary's Corner
- Mayfield
- McCormick
- Meskill
- Newaukum
- Randle
- Saint Urban
- Salkum
- Silver Creek
- Swofford
- Wildwood
- Wilson
- Winston

=== Former communities ===
- Burnt Ridge
- Ceres
- Cora
- Hanaford
- Kopiah
- Kosmos (inundated)
- Lindberg
- Mendota
- Nesika (inundated)
- Riffe (inundated)
- Walville

== Demographics ==
Historical population
Census	Pop.	Note	%±
1850	558		—
1860	384		−31.2%
1870	888		131.3%
1880	2,600		192.8%
1890	11,499		342.3%
1900	15,157		31.8%
1910	32,127		112.0%
1920	36,840		14.7%
1930	40,034		8.7%
1940	41,393		3.4%
1950	43,755		5.7%
1960	41,858		−4.3%
1970	45,467		8.6%
1980	56,025		23.2%
1990	59,358		5.9%
2000	68,600		15.6%
2010	75,455		10.0%
2020	82,149		8.9%
2025 (est.)	88,062	▲	7.2%
U.S. Decennial Census; 1790–1960 1900–1990; 1990–2000 2010–2020

=== 2020 census ===
As of the 2020 census, the county had a population of 82,149. Of the residents, 22.1% were under the age of 18 and 21.6% were 65 years of age or older; the median age was 42.6 years. For every 100 females there were 100.0 males, and for every 100 females age 18 and over there were 98.1 males. 39.8% of residents lived in urban areas and 60.2% lived in rural areas.

Based on a data release by the United States Census, which detailed population growth and shifts between 2020-2025, an increase of over 800 children were recorded in the county, the largest numerical gain in the state.

Lewis County, Washington – Racial and ethnic composition Note: the US Census treats Hispanic/Latino as an ethnic category. This table excludes Latinos from the racial categories and assigns them to a separate category. Hispanics/Latinos may be of any race.
Race / Ethnicity (NH = Non-Hispanic)	Pop 2000	Pop 2010	Pop 2020	% 2000	% 2010	% 2020
White alone (NH)	62,174	64,881	65,496	90.63%	85.99%	79.73%
Black or African American alone (NH)	239	370	530	0.35%	0.49%	0.65%
Native American or Alaska Native alone (NH)	795	952	978	1.16%	1.26%	1.19%
Asian alone (NH)	466	643	796	0.68%	0.85%	0.97%
Pacific Islander alone (NH)	115	103	157	0.17%	0.14%	0.19%
Other race alone (NH)	73	73	403	0.11%	0.10%	0.49%
Mixed race or Multiracial (NH)	1,054	1,906	4,959	1.54%	2.53%	6.04%
Hispanic or Latino (any race)	3,684	6,527	8,830	5.37%	8.65%	10.75%
Total	68,600	75,455	82,149	100.00%	100.00%	100.00%

The racial makeup of the county was 82.6% White, 0.7% Black or African American, 1.4% American Indian and Alaska Native, 1.0% Asian, 5.1% from some other race, and 9.0% from two or more races. Hispanic or Latino residents of any race comprised 10.7% of the population.

There were 31,693 households in the county, of which 28.5% had children under the age of 18 living with them and 23.9% had a female householder with no spouse or partner present. About 25.7% of all households were made up of individuals and 13.2% had someone living alone who was 65 years of age or older.

There were 35,412 housing units, of which 10.5% were vacant. Among occupied housing units, 71.0% were owner-occupied and 29.0% were renter-occupied. The homeowner vacancy rate was 1.6% and the rental vacancy rate was 4.7%.

=== 2010 census ===
As of the 2010 Census, there were 75,455 people, 29,743 households, and 20,104 families residing in the county. The population density was 31.4 people per square mile (12.1 people/km^{2}). There were 34,050 housing units at an average density of 14.2 units per square mile (5.5 units/km^{2}). The racial makeup of the county's population: 89.7% white, 1.4% American Indian, 0.9% Asian, 0.5% black or African American, 0.2% Pacific islander, 4.0% from other races, and 3.2% from two or more races. Those of Hispanic or Latino origin made up 8.7% of the population. In terms of ancestry, 24.1% were German, 14.9% were Irish, 12.5% were English, 7.7% were American, and 5.1% were Norwegian.

Of the 29,743 households, 30.2% had children under the age of 18 living with them, 51.2% were married couples living together, 10.9% had a female householder with no husband present, 32.4% were non-families, and 25.7% of all households were made up of individuals. The average household size was 2.51 and the average family size was 2.97. The median age was 41.5 years.

The median income for a household in the county was $43,874 and the median income for a family was $53,358. Males had a median income of $43,695 versus $31,720 for females. The per capita income for the county was $21,695. About 10.3% of families and 13.3% of the population were below the poverty line, including 18.2% of those under age 18 and 8.6% of those age 65 or over.

=== Homelessness ===
Lewis County participates in the Point In Time Count (PTC), a census of the homeless population as required by law. Beginning in 2003 as mandated by the United States Department of Housing and Urban Development (HUD), the annual PTC, which tracks the number of individuals and families experiencing homelessness on a specified date, is usually held in January.

Homeless residents in the county were listed as 309 in 2012, falling to 205 in 2013. A count in 2018 reported 132 homeless residents, and following counts reported 161 in 2019, 142 in 2020, 120 in 2022, and 153 in 2023. There was no census of homeless residents taken in 2021.

Students and children under the age of 18 who are described as, "in an overnight accommodation insecure situation", are not officially recorded as part of the PTC, however a count in 2018 reported 558 students who meet the qualifications to be listed as homeless.

== Government and politics ==
United States presidential election results for Lewis County, Washington
Year	Republican		Democratic		Third party(ies)	
Year	No.	%	No.	%	No.	%
1892	1,350	41.49%	1,014	31.16%	890	27.35%
1896	1,594	48.35%	1,654	50.17%	49	1.49%
1900	1,907	55.40%	1,382	40.15%	153	4.45%
1904	3,098	69.93%	896	20.23%	436	9.84%
1908	3,170	60.45%	1,412	26.93%	662	12.62%
1912	3,200	32.70%	2,471	25.25%	4,115	42.05%
1916	5,186	48.92%	4,318	40.73%	1,097	10.35%
1920	6,160	54.59%	2,212	19.60%	2,913	25.81%
1924	6,973	58.07%	1,544	12.86%	3,490	29.07%
1928	9,253	71.12%	3,591	27.60%	166	1.28%
1932	4,647	29.80%	8,454	54.21%	2,493	15.99%
1936	5,885	35.23%	9,619	57.58%	1,201	7.19%
1940	9,228	49.28%	9,280	49.56%	218	1.16%
1944	8,896	53.19%	7,706	46.07%	124	0.74%
1948	9,047	50.39%	8,394	46.76%	512	2.85%
1952	12,287	62.78%	7,115	36.35%	169	0.86%
1956	11,949	60.69%	7,714	39.18%	25	0.13%
1960	11,012	56.53%	8,411	43.18%	57	0.29%
1964	6,933	36.45%	12,070	63.45%	19	0.10%
1968	8,779	47.03%	8,444	45.23%	1,445	7.74%
1972	12,071	58.64%	6,946	33.74%	1,568	7.62%
1976	10,933	51.65%	9,026	42.64%	1,208	5.71%
1980	13,636	59.94%	6,962	30.60%	2,151	9.46%
1984	15,846	66.22%	7,634	31.90%	451	1.88%
1988	14,184	61.04%	8,629	37.13%	425	1.83%
1992	12,316	45.33%	7,810	28.75%	7,042	25.92%
1996	13,238	47.89%	10,331	37.37%	4,075	14.74%
2000	18,565	61.91%	9,891	32.99%	1,530	5.10%
2004	21,042	64.89%	10,726	33.08%	660	2.04%
2008	20,278	58.43%	13,624	39.26%	803	2.31%
2012	20,452	60.08%	12,664	37.20%	928	2.73%
2016	21,992	62.48%	9,654	27.43%	3,553	10.09%
2020	29,391	64.87%	14,520	32.05%	1,398	3.09%
2024	29,322	64.67%	14,433	31.83%	1,583	3.49%

=== National level ===
In modern times, Lewis County is the most conservative county in western Washington. It is significantly more Republican than adjacent counties. Unlike much of western Washington, it has a strong tinge of social conservatism. In 2000, George W. Bush received over 60% of the county's vote. In 2008 John McCain defeated Barack Obama by a margin of over 19% — his only victory in a county west of the Cascades. McCain lost all the neighboring counties except Yakima. Since Washington's statehood in 1889 only three Democratic presidential candidates have carried the county – William Jennings Bryan in 1896, Franklin D. Roosevelt three times in 1932, 1936 and 1940, plus Lyndon B. Johnson in 1964. (Note: The leading "other" candidate in the 1912 Presidential election, Progressive Theodore Roosevelt, received 2,032 votes, while Socialist candidate Eugene Debs received 1,637 votes, Prohibition candidate Eugene Chafin received 410 votes, and Socialist Labor candidate Arthur Reimer received 36 votes.)

All told, as of 2026, 20 of the last 21 Republican presidential tickets successfully carried Lewis County, the only exception being that of Barry Goldwater who lost to the aforementioned Johnson.

It is part of Washington's 3rd congressional district, which has been represented by Democrat Marie Gluesenkamp Perez since 2023.

=== Gubernatorial races ===
In the 1970s, Democratic candidates for governor won the county, but this was something of an anomaly. The last Democratic candidate for Governor to win the county was Booth Gardner in 1984.

=== State representation ===
The county's government is the 20th district of the state. It is represented solely by Republicans.

- Senator John Braun—Republican
- Representative Peter Abbarno—Position 1, Republican
- Representative Ed Orcutt—Position 2, Republican

=== County level ===
The county's government is solely Republican.

- Lewis County Assessor: Dianne Dorey—R
- Lewis County Auditor: Larry E. Grove—R
- Lewis County Clerk: Scott Tinney—R
- Coroner Warren Mcleod—R
- Lewis County Prosecuting Attorney: Jonathan Meyer—R
- Lewis County Sheriff: Rob Snaza—R
- Lewis County Treasurer: Arny Davis—R

Commissioners

- Sean D. Swope, District #1—R
- Dr. Lindsey Pollock, District #2—R
- Scott J. Brummer, District #3—R

=== Law enforcement ===
The Lewis County Sherriff's Department contains a marine patrol unit. Patrolling several waterways in the county, including Riffe Lake and the Cowlitz River, the unit investigates boating accidents while providing water safety education, with an emphasis on the inspections of watercraft. The Marine Patrol and Swift Water Rescue divisions added two Sea-Doo watercraft to its inventory in 2025. The units are part of a larger Lewis County Technical Rescue Team that encompasses members from the sheriff's office and various fire departments and districts.

== Economy ==
Top employers in Lewis County (2024)
Rank	Employer	Type of business	Number of employees
1	Providence Centralia Hospital	Health care	900
2	United Natural Foods	Food Wholesale/Distribution	750
3	Walmart	Retail	653
4	Lewis County	Government	624 (2021)
5	Centralia School District	Education	530
6	Centralia College	Education	472
7	Chehalis School District	Education	420
8	Michaels	Distribution/Warehouse	310 (2021)
9	Hamptons Lumber Mills	Timber	305
10	Braun Northwest, Inc.	Manufacturing	275

Lumber production has been an historical staple of the economy in Lewis County. Beginning with the build of railroads and the clearing and dredging of the Chehalis River, logging began as a main industry in the 1880s. Timber processing grew into the 20th century, leading to higher employment and protests against unfair labor practices that sometimes were violent, such as the 1919 Centralia Tragedy. Logging "went through a slump" during the 1920s which decreased further throughout the Great Depression. Economic conditions in the county improved during World War II with an increased demand for wood and agricultural products to support the war effort.

As of 2024, the county annually produces 600,000 short tons (540,000 t) of dried timber while hosting 10 pulpwood production plants. Due to the region's biomass production capabilities, the county was the first in the state to receive a Bioeconomy Development Opportunity (BDO) Zone rating of AA by the BDO Zone Initiative. Lewis County is a leading producer of Christmas trees in the United States, with a yield of over 548,000 trees in 2022, which ranked sixth in the country.

A leading economic producer for the county is farming, with the region also holding large numbers for employment in mining, production, and warehousing.

Tourism is a large part of the Lewis County economy. In 2023, over 5.6 million people visited the county, an increase of 5.8% over the prior year. Over 45% of visitors came from outside the state and the most visited areas include Mt. Rainier and the shopping districts in the twin cities of Centralia and Chehalis. In collaboration with Discover Lewis County, a county-created tourism initiative, and the Economic Alliance of Lewis County, the county has focused on merchandise and online marketing, specifically promoting each town and city within its borders.

In 2000, approximately 37% of jobs in the county were considered blue-collar. Reports from 2019-2020 list wages and incomes to be less than the state averages, with the median annual wages to be over $48,000 and a total household income of under $59,000. Unemployment is perennially moderately higher than the state average, though boom years in large Lewis County economic sectors can influence the employment levels. As of 2020, women held 48.6% of jobs in the county primarily in finance, health care, and education, where men held majority employment in such industries as construction, manufacturing, and utility jobs.

== Arts and culture ==
=== Art ===
The county is home to the ARTrails of Southwest Washington initiative. The cooperative, begun in 2003, showcases local artists, art studios and galleries throughout the region, and holds an annual autumnal studio tour that incorporates events in smaller towns within Lewis County. The Lewis County Historical Museum hosts a permanent ARTrails gallery. and Centralia is home to the nexus of the event and an ARTrails-owned gallery.

=== Charitable organizations ===
The Lewis County branch of the American Association of University Women (AAUW) has been in existence since 1923. The organization has held an annual used book sale since 1979. The proceeds help to fund scholarships, day camps, film festivals, and career days for young women in middle and high school.

=== Heritage barns ===
As of 2018, Lewis County is home to 17 barns listed on the Washington State Heritage Barn Register. A structure, or "large agricultural outbuilding", must be over 50 years old and has to have "maintained historical significance and integrity.” Seven barns are located in Chehalis and three barns are located in Onalaska. Additional historic buildings are registered in Curtis, Doty, Toledo, and Winlock.

== Education ==
The county is home to Centralia College, founded in 1925. Located in the middle of Centralia, it is the oldest continuously operating community college in the state.

== Parks and recreation ==
As of 2022, Lewis County directly oversees 164.0 acres (66.4 ha) of parks. Recreation areas and sites under the auspices of the Lewis County Parks and Recreation Department include Adna's Back Memorial Park and Rose Parks, Centralia's Schaefer County Park, Claquato Church, Cowlitz River Park (Packwood Park), South County Regional Park in Toledo, and St. Urban Church. The county honors the travels of pioneer Ezra Meeker on the Oregon Trail with several historical markers throughout the region.

The Lewis County Historic Bike Ride is an annual, mid-spring fundraising event that began as a county-held historic celebration in the early 1990s. The ride starts in Mary's Corner and through a variety of course options, participants can travel to several small towns and communities in the county and can bike through Centralia and Chehalis. The route is often used as a warm-up by riders of the Seattle to Portland Bicycle Classic (STP).

In 2010, the county declared that all parks under its jurisdiction were to be "No Shooting Zones".

== Infrastructure ==
=== Healthcare ===
Beginning in June 2025, ambulance services are provided by Medix Ambulance under county contract, replacing American Medical Response (AMR). The prior contract with AMR evolved from a joint initiative with St. Helens Hospital and a local emergency provider known as City Ambulance that began in May 1982.

=== Transportation ===
Early highways in Lewis County include White Pass Highway, which was completed and opened in August 1951, and Pacific Highway. Sections of the Pacific thoroughfare were converted into Interstate 5.

=== Utilities ===
Several dams have been built in the county to provide electricity to the region, including Cowlitz Falls Dam, Mayfield Dam, and Mossyrock Dam. Due to large amounts of discovered bituminous coal in Lewis County in 1951, the Centralia Steam-Electric Plant was constructed; the facility opened in 1971.

The Lewis County Public Utility District (LCPUD) provides electricity to the county. In 2024, the LCPUD became a broadband internet service provider, offering high-speed internet to the region via a federal grant. The project, meant specifically for rural residents in the county, is expected to be completed in late 2027.

==== Renewable energy ====
In late 2023, the county was announced as part of the Pacific Northwest Hydrogen Hub (PNW H2) initiative through the U.S. Department of Energy. Lewis County would be utilized for the production and storage of hydrogen fuels, including the potential manufacturing of related hydrogen fuel products, such as vehicles and fuel cells. The PNW H2 has provided grants to several economic and educational areas in the county, including funding to school districts, Centralia College, Puget Sound Energy (PSE), and various renewable energy companies. Lewis County Transit was awarded a grant from the program, becoming the only transit agency in the United States to receive funding from the hub program.

Lewis County is the location of the Skookumchuck Wind Farm which contains 38 wind turbines that can generate a maximum of 138.6 megawatt-hours (499 GJ). The 22,000-acre (8,900 ha) site became operational in late 2020 and the energy produced is used through PSE's Green Direct program.

== See also ==
- Chehalis River Basin Flood Authority
- Lewis County Transit
- National Register of Historic Places listings in Lewis County, Washington
