= Galvin, Washington =

Unincorporated community in Washington, United States

- Unincorporated community
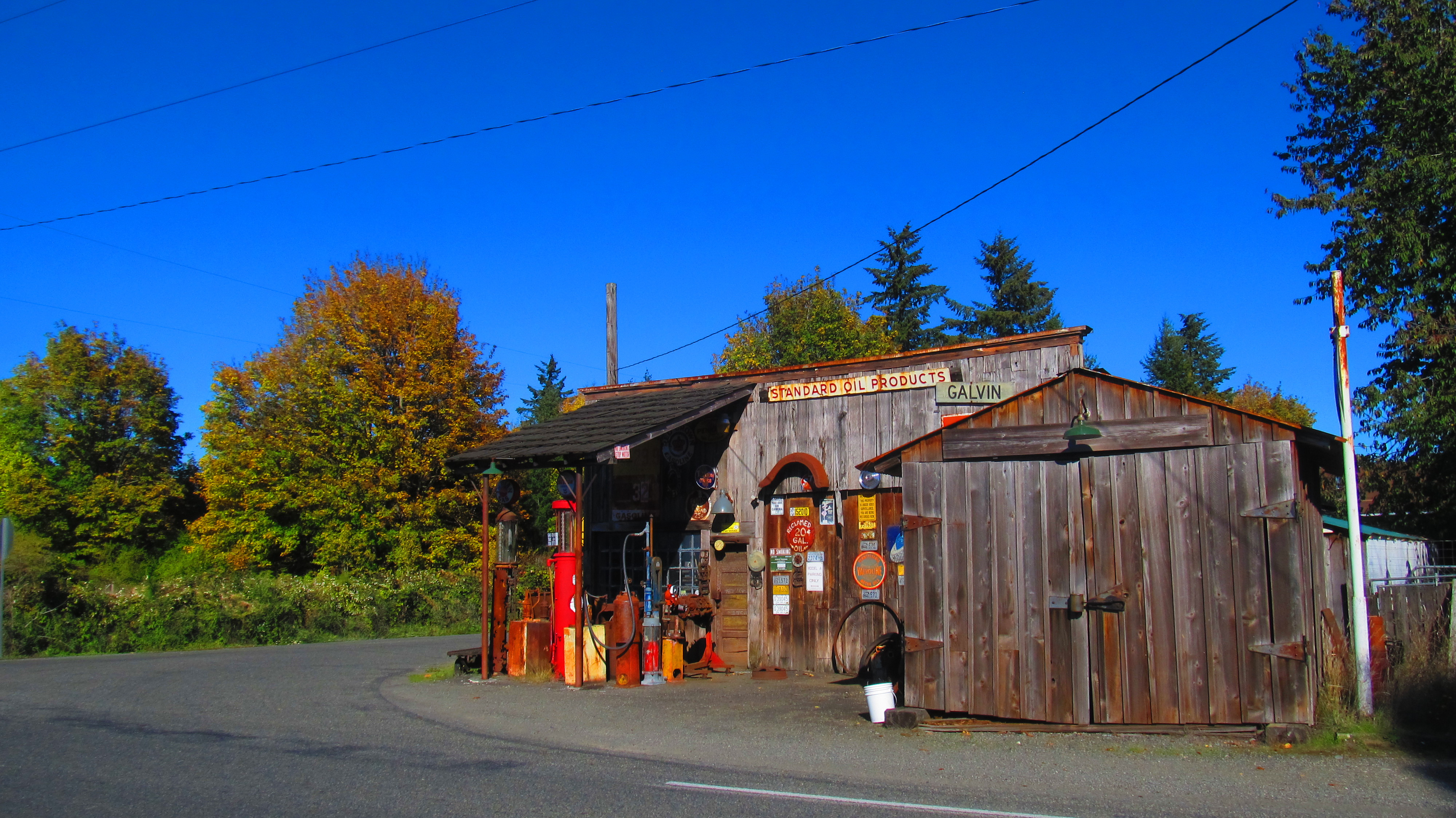
- Busek Auto Museum, downtown Galvin, Washington

- Location within Washington (state) Location within the United States
- Coordinates: 46°44′32″N 123°01′37″W
- Country: United States
- State: Washington
- County: Lewis
- Established: 1910
- Elevation: 160 ft (50 m)
- Time zone: UTC-8 (Pacific (PST))
  - Summer (DST): UTC-7 (PDT)
- ZIP Code: 98531, 98544
- Area code(s): 360, 564

Galvin, also known as Lincoln or Lincoln's Creek, is an unincorporated community in Lewis County, Washington, United States, near Lincoln Creek and the Chehalis River. The town is four miles (6.4 km) northwest of Centralia.

Galvin was platted on June 3, 1910, as a logging settlement. Originally named Lincoln, it was renamed the next year for John Galvin, its founder. A span over the Chehalis River, known as the Galvin Bridge, was built in 1913. The original 280 foot (85 metres) thoroughfare was dismantled and rebuilt beginning in 1968.

The city is noted for the Busek Auto Museum, a collection of a variety of vintage vehicles, which was featured in a 2007 independent film, Rain in the Mountains.
