= Saint Francis Xavier Mission (Lewis County, Washington) =

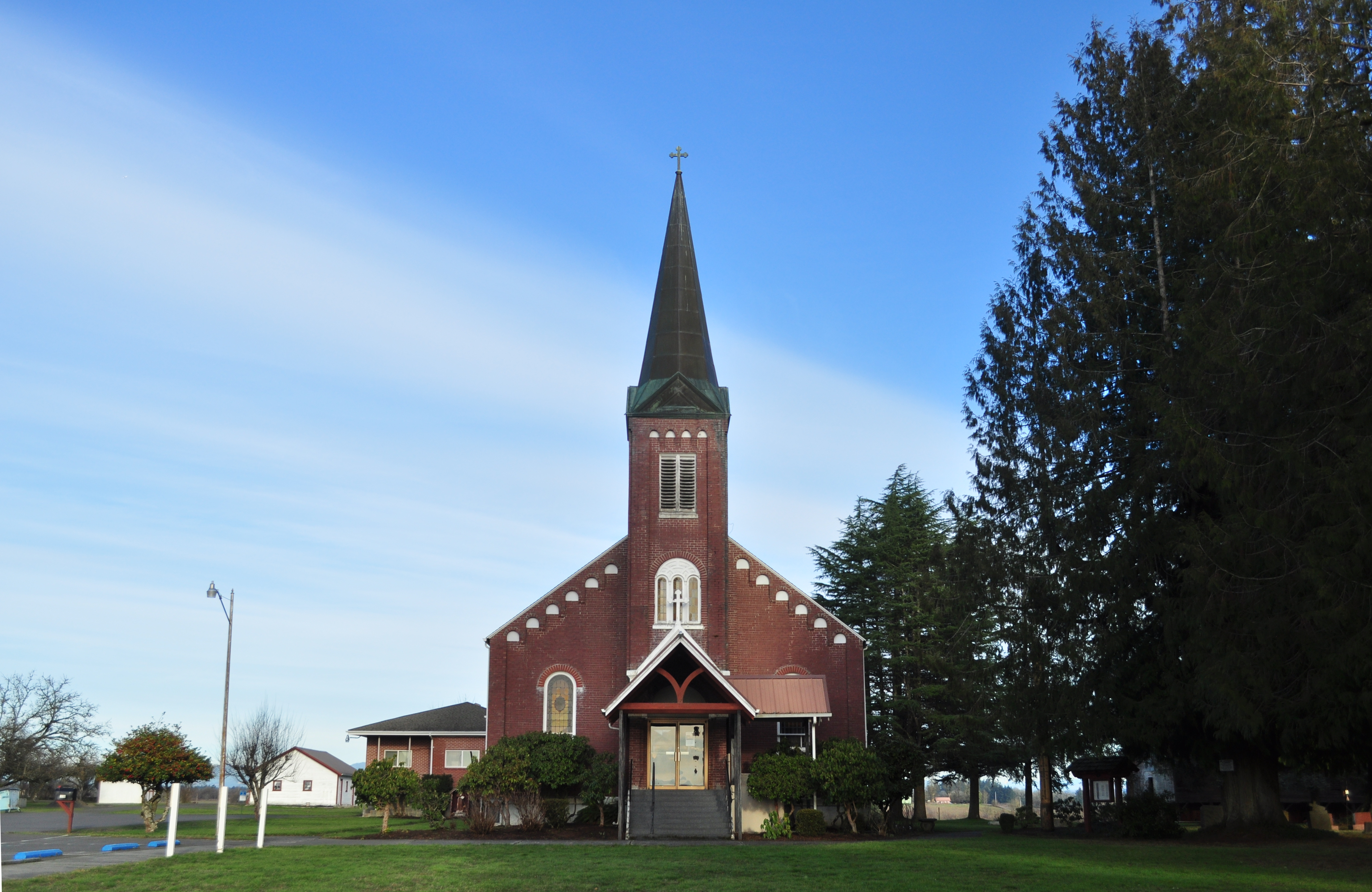
- Saint Francis Xavier Mission, 2019
- Saint Francis Xavier Mission
- 46°28′05″N 122°49′25″W
- Country: United States
- Denomination: Catholic Church

History
- Founded: 16 December 1838

The Saint Francis Xavier Mission, in Lewis County, Washington three miles north of present-day Toledo, was the first Catholic mission in what is now the U.S. state of Washington. As of 2019, the Saint Francis Xavier Mission Church is the oldest Catholic church in the state.

== History ==
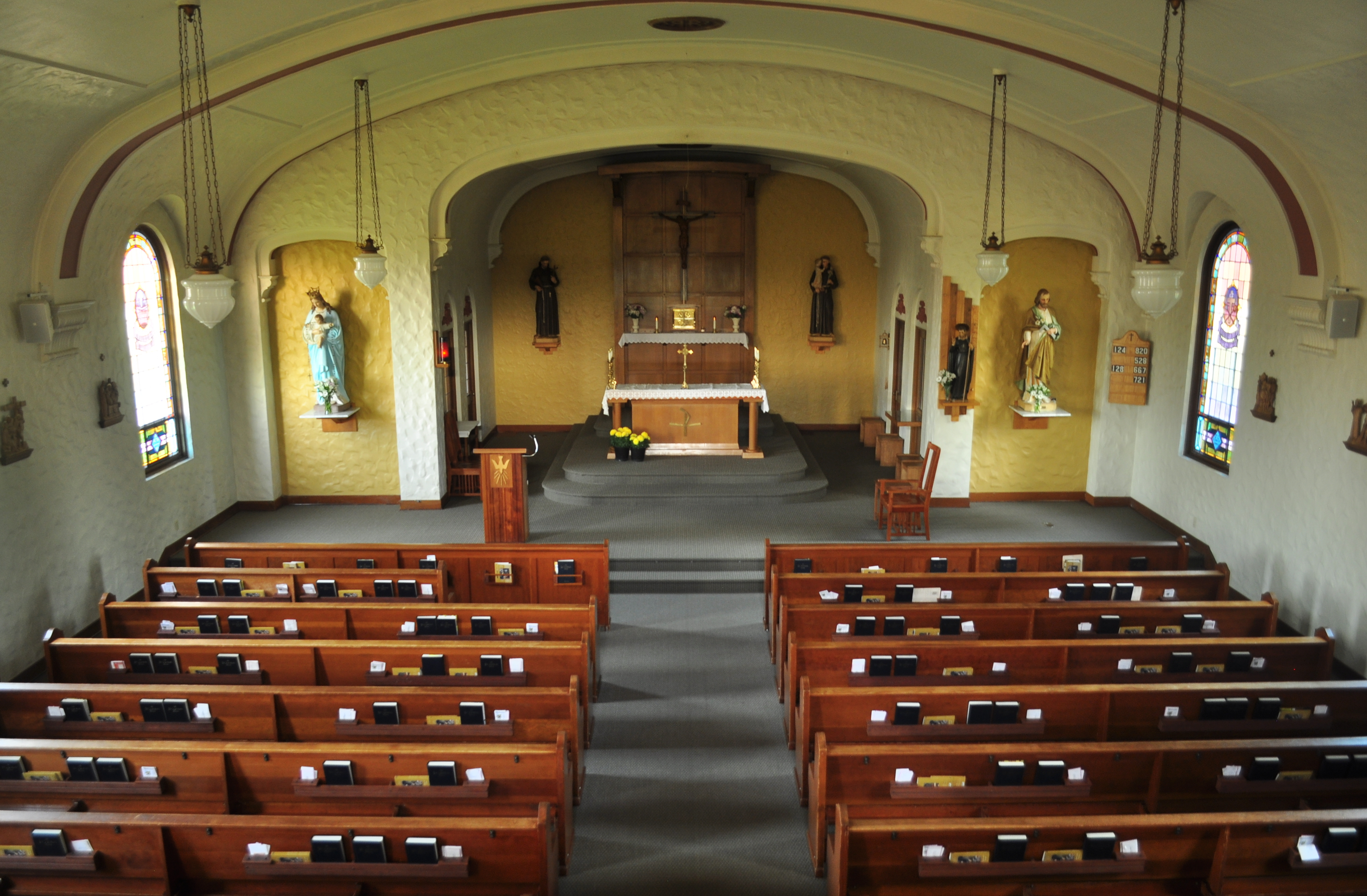
Church interior (2019).

The first recorded Mass held at the site was on December 16, 1838, by François Norbert Blanchet, who co-founded the mission with Modeste Demers. (Note: The source gives a founding date of 1839, contradicting most others.) Although considered the founding date, the mission cemetery predates the mission, having been started by the Hudson's Bay Company approximately in 1831. The mission, which originally occupied 640 acres of Cowlitz Prairie, is also known as the Cowlitz Mission and as Saint Mary's by members of the Cowlitz Indian Tribe, after a girl's boarding school that operated there from 1911 to 1973.

Here and elsewhere, Blanchet used a visual device known as the "Catholic Ladder" as a means of instruction about the history of Christianity and the Catholic Church. There is a wooden reproduction of the Catholic ladder as part of the present-day mission.

One of the largest changes that has impacted the Church of Saint Francis Xavier since the departure of the Franscscian Friars is the lack of clergy. The parish, once the hub of several other Southwest Washington missions has been reduced to one. Its former parishes included Sacred Heart in Winlock (closed 2016), Morton's Sacred Heart (closed 2018), Saint Agnes in Napavine (closed 1980), and St. Urban's Our Lady of the Assumption which closed in 1965. The Church of Saint Yves, located in Harmony, and the church of Saint Mary in Kelso are all that remain from the once large mission. Since 2009 the former St. Mary's has served as senior housing for the tribe.

=== Building history ===
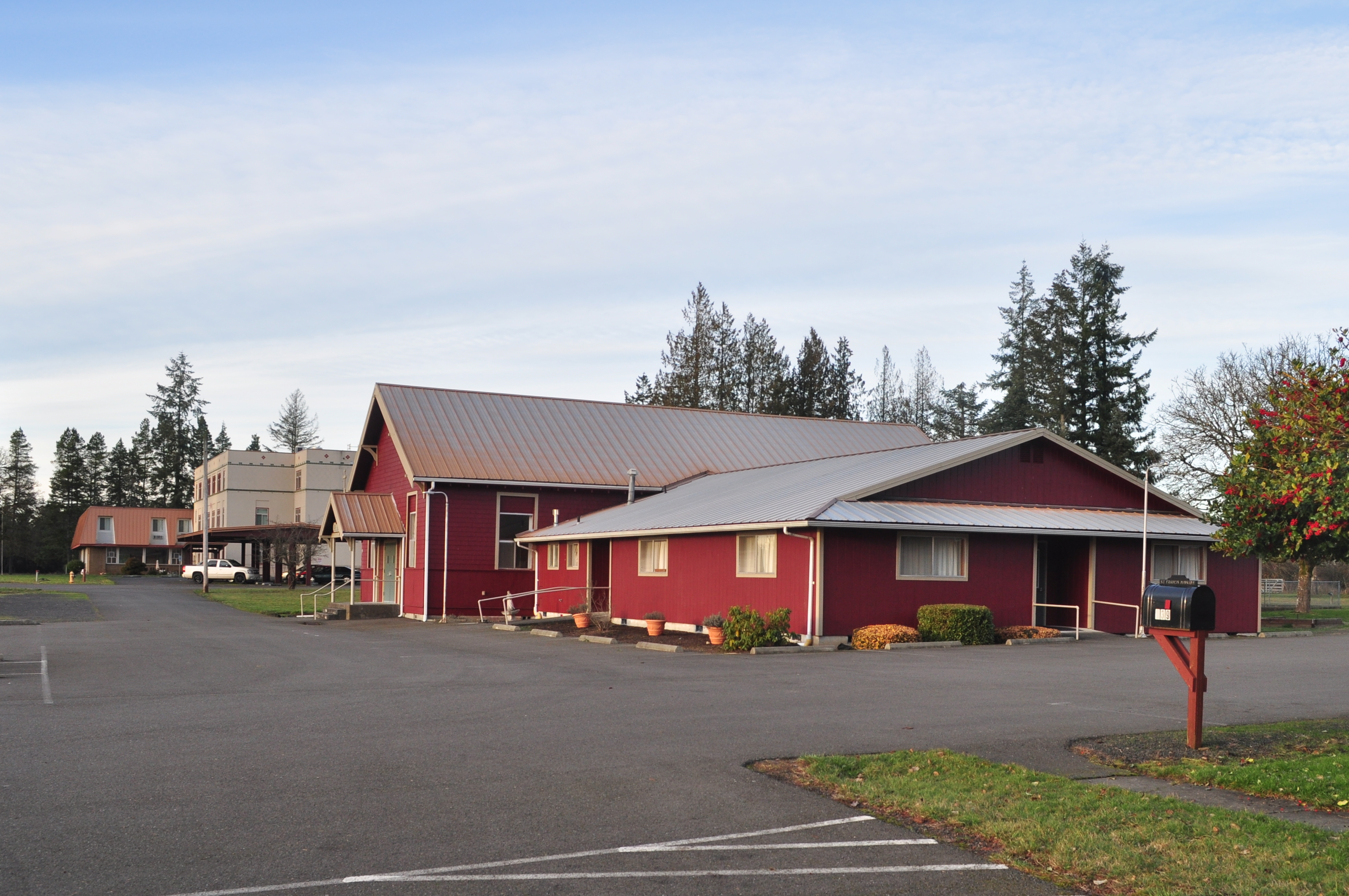
In foreground, St. Joseph Hall (church hall); in background at left, the former St. Mary's Academy, now property of the Cowlitz Indian Tribe and used mainly as senior housing (2019).

There have been a series of buildings on the site. The first chapel was a log building erected no later than July 1839. It was replaced by a larger church in 1879 which was destroyed by fire in 1901. The blaze resulted in the loss of the parish records as well as the death of a priest, Father Van Holdebeke, who died of injuries sustained trying to salvage those records. A rebuilt church was destroyed by fire in 1916. A new brick church was built in 1917, but its interior burned in 1932; the present-day church is a rebuilt version of the 1917 brick church. There have also been several church halls, friaries, and rectories existing on the grounds since its inception.

== Education ==
The Sisters of Providence operated a convent and the Providence of Our Lady of the Sacred Heart School from November 13, 1876, through the school year of 1897–1898, teaching both boys and girls, separately from one another. Most of their students were French Canadian Catholics. The school failed financially owing in part to the Depression of 1893 and the increased availability of public schools in nearby towns. Later, Franciscan friars served at the mission from 1908 to 1996, and Franciscan Sisters (Sisters of St. Francis of Penance and Charity) operated a boarding school for girls, St. Mary's Academy, 1911 to 1973; the buildings for this school are distinct from those of the old Sisters of Providence school. The former St. Mary's buildings are now owned by Cowlitz Tribal Housing, associated with the Cowlitz Indian Tribe.

Senior class members from Jesuit High School in Beaverton, Oregon, since 1996, undertake a traditional 12-mile (19 km) walk from the Cowlitz Salmon Hatchery to the mission. Described as a pilgrimage and a rite of passage, the event is a show of class unity and friendship that involves prayer and reflection. The walk usually contains a theme and students are taught the history of the St. Xavier mission. The day usually ends with a meal and worship service. As of 2023, approximately 7,000 people, mostly students, family, and faculty, have participated in the walk.

== See also ==
- Fort Cowlitz
