= Fort Cowlitz =

Hudson Bay Company outpost

Coordinates: 46.467°N 122.826°W

Fort Cowlitz or Cowlitz Farm was an agricultural operation by the British Puget Sound Agricultural Company (PSAC), a subsidiary of the Hudson's Bay Company (HBC). It was located on the Cowlitz plains, adjacent to the west bank of the Cowlitz River and several miles northeast of modern Toledo, Washington. The farm was begun during spring of 1839, and its produce soon supplied HBC posts in New Caledonia and Columbia Departments. In the RAC-HBC Agreement, the Russian-American Company received at Novo-Arkhangelsk grain and dairy products from the PSAC along with manufactured goods. Fort Cowlitz produced most of the Company wheat quotas, and its fellow PSAC station Fort Nisqually tended most of the sheep and cattle flocks. By the expiration of the agreement in 1850, Cowlitz Farm wasn't able to meet Russian supply demands.

Cowlitz Farm was established during the joint occupation of Oregon Country between the United Kingdom and the United States of America. The border between British North America and the United States was negotiated in 1846, to extend through Oregon Country mostly on the 49th parallel north. Administrative orders were sent from the center of the HBC Columbia Department, located at Fort Vancouver and later Fort Victoria. Agricultural areas established by Fort Cowlitz were increasingly claimed by arriving American immigrants in the 1840s, beginning contentious legal battles. A settlement with the United States for the sale of PSAC property occurred on 10 September 1869, the company to be paid $200,000 in gold coins (equivalent to $4,840,000 in 2025}).

== Background ==
Two former HBC employees retired in the lands of the Cowlitz people in 1833, encouraged by their former employers. By the time Catholic missionary François Blanchet visited the farmers five years later, two more French-Canadians had also retired there. Blanchet reached the farmsteads on 16 December 1838 and arranged for 640 acres (260 ha) of mostly prairie to become the site of the St. Francis Xavier Mission.

== Foundation ==
James Douglas in 1839 ordered farming equipment, heads of cattle and nine employees to the Cowlitz plains, where around 3,000 acres (1,200 ha) of fertile soil existed. John Tod, Chief Trader in the party, found farming "a new experience for me, and agreeable for a time, but devoid of incidents, with any personal bearing." The buildings that composed Fort Cowlitz over time included residencies for employees, a granary with two levels, 2 storehouses, stables and 14 barns. Housing for the presiding officer was made "of hewed logs framed in the French style, clap-boarded on the outside, and lined and papered on the inside; the windows were from the Old Post at Fort George..." The granary had the dimensions of 25 by 20 feet, with three stories and was "framed of large hewed timber and boarded on the outside..."

== Operations ==
Employees of the Company labored over 1839 under Chief Trader John Tod to sow almost 300 bushels of wheat, and plow 200 acres (81 ha) of land at the Cowlitz farm. Fort Cowlitz quickly became the main source of grain for the PGAC. The farm's labor was fairly diverse, eventually including French-Canadians, Hawaiians, Nisqualls, Americans and Cowlitzes. Nisqually and Cowlitzes performed labors such as digging wells, along with sowing and reaping the fields. Hawaiians worked on erecting stables, barns and warehouses, besides general labor duties in the farms. Their residency was a separate building. Cowlitz Farm had an estimated 600 acres (240 ha) under cultivation in 1841, producing around 8,000 bushels of wheat and 4,000 bushels of oats, as well as staples of barley, peas, and potatoes. Blanchet complained of the conduct of the 13 farm staff in 1842, claiming them to "not all prove themselves exemplary" and be a poor influence upon natives. "It becomes almost impossible to succeed with the [Cowlitz] natives, when often one sees them dragged into vice by those even who should on the contrary give them only examples of virtue."

Also in 1841 members of the Sinclair Expedition settled there and at Fort Nisqually

Military officials from the United States and the United Kingdom were sent to perform reconnaissance in the Oregon Country in the 1840s. Charles Wilkes of the United States Exploring Expedition in 1841 concluded that Fort Cowlitz had "no sort of defense about it" due to the neighboring Cowlitz and Klickitat bands having "too great" of a commercial dependence on the Company. Mervin Vavasour reported to his superiors in 1845 of the strategic value of Fort Cowlitz: "From the Cowlitz Farm the troops, etc., can descend the river in boats to the Columbia, and proceed to any required position on it by the same means."

PSAC and HBC relations with the Provisional Government of Oregon were normalized in 1845. In 1847 three land claims by PSAC employees claimed 1,920 acres (780 ha) of Cowlitz Farm. During this year over 1,400 of these acres (570 ha) were being cultivated by 19 staff members. The California Gold Rush later contributed to the decline in employee numbers, by 1851 only six remained.

Despite having a night watch, Indigenous peoples occasionally took potatoes from the Company farms. After such a "depredation" by a band of Nisqually, one man received "a good hiding" from Roberts. Harvesting of the potato fields was mostly performed by the wives of Nisqually laborers for the PSAC. Diseases such as measles began to strike Hawaiian and Native employees in 1847. Operations across the farms were left in a standstill, forcing Roberts to hire several Americans to continue making fencing. As the illnesses spread among the neighboring natives during the winter of 1848, Fort Cowlitz provided medical aid and food to the afflicted: "We have to feed & assist all the Indians about us, draw fire wood for them &c. 3 died to day. All hands either ill themselves or attending their sick families."

== Encroachment by Americans ==
A former clerk that ran Fort Cowlitz, George Roberts, leased the remaining 160 acres (65 ha) held by the post in 1859, agreeing to maintain the buildings as rent. Roberts became embroiled in legal battles with American settlers who denied the validity of PSAC claims composing its farm. A meeting held in November 1848 by American residents of Lewis County proclaimed that:

"That we view the claims as located by the chief factor of the Hudson's Bay Company, or Puget Sound Agricultural Society, for the servants in the employ of said company, as amounting to a nullity, unless said persons for whom said lands were located are out of the employment of said society, or company, and have settled on and continue to occupy the same."

Despite the hostile reception with some neighbors, Roberts continued to lease from the PSAC until 1870.

== Management ==
Manager	Position	Tenure
John Tod	Chief Trader	1839-1840
Francis Ermatinger	Chief Trader	1840-1843
Robert Logan	post master	1843-1848
Charles Forrest	post master	1845-1846
George Roberts	clerk	1846-1851
Henry Newsham Peers	clerk	1851-1853
Henry N. Peers	Chief Trader	1853-1857
