= Washington State Route 122 =

State highway in Lewis County, Washington, US

State Route 122

- SR 122 highlighted in red

Route information
- Auxiliary route of US 12
- Maintained by WSDOT
- Length: 7.88 mi (12.68 km)
- Existed: 1991–present

Major junctions
- West end: US 12 in Silver Creek
- East end: US 12 in Mossyrock

Location
- Country: United States
- State: Washington
- Counties: Lewis

Highway system
- State highways in Washington; Interstate; US; State; Scenic; Pre-1964; 1964 renumbering; Former
← SR 121	→ SR 123

State Route 122 (SR 122) is a 7.88-mile-long (12.68 km) state highway on the north shore of Lake Mayfield in rural Lewis County, located within the U.S. state of Washington. The highway begins at U.S. Route 12 (US 12) in Silver Creek and travels east through Ike Kinswa State Park before turning south over the Cowlitz River to Mossyrock, ending at US 12. SR 122 was established in 1991 on roads built in the 1910s and 1940s and the designation was transferred from SR 142.

== Route description ==
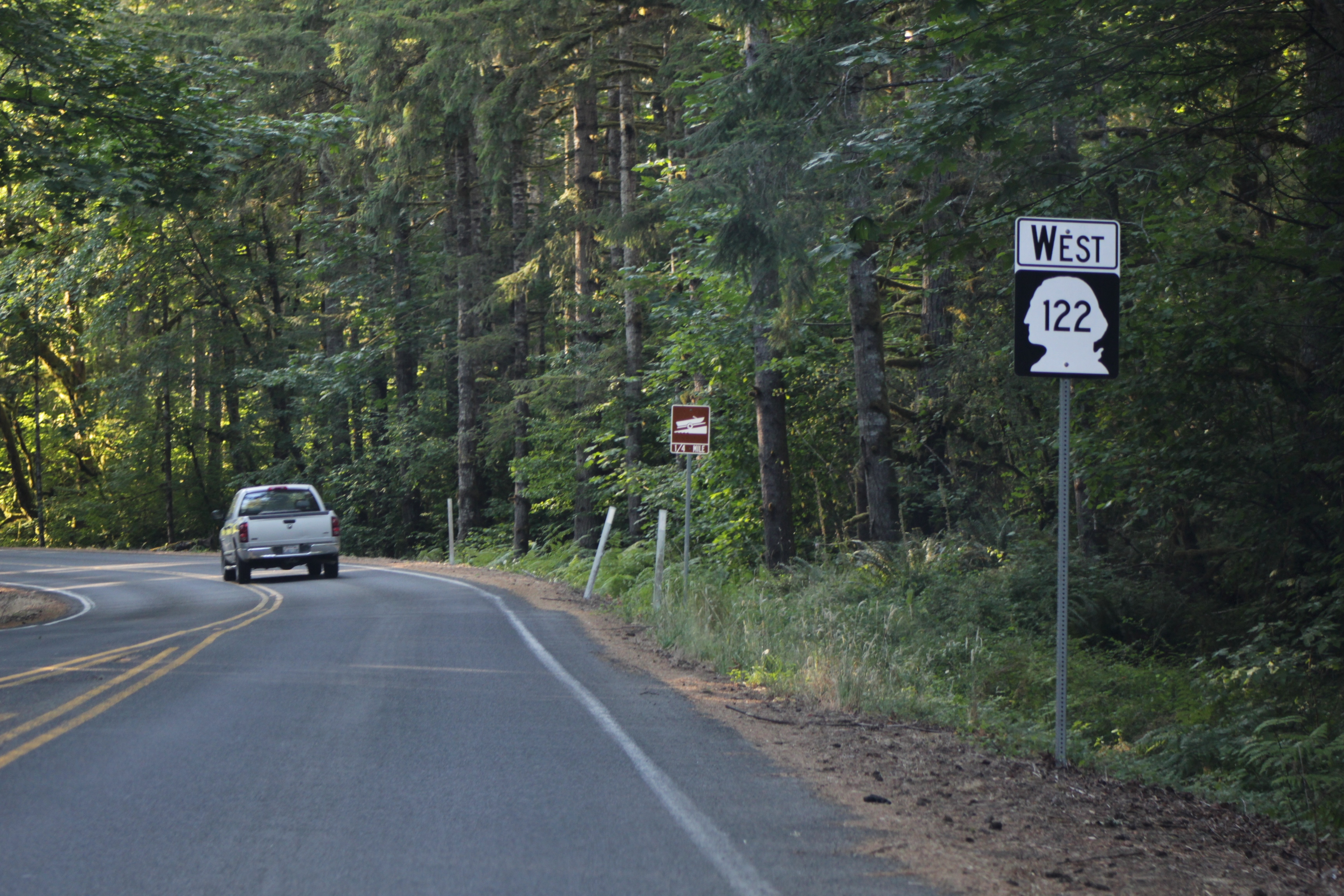
SR 122 near its eastern terminus in Mossyrock

SR 122 begins as Silver Creek Road at an intersection with US 12 in the unincorporated community of Silver Creek in rural Lewis County. The highway travels northeast over Silver Creek towards Lake Mayfield, becoming Harmony Road. SR 122 continues east along the north shore of the lake and crosses the Tilton River before passing through Ike Kinswa State Park. The highway continues east to Harmony, where it turns south to cross the Cowlitz River, eventually ending at an intersection with US 12 north of Mossyrock.

Every year, the Washington State Department of Transportation (WSDOT) conducts a series of surveys on its highways in the state to measure traffic volume. This is expressed in terms of annual average daily traffic (AADT), which is a measure of traffic volume for any average day of the year. In 2011, WSDOT calculated that between 850 and 1,100 vehicles per day used the highway, mostly at the US 12 intersection in Mossyrock.

== History ==
SR 122 between Silver Creek and Harmony follows the route of an unpaved road built in the 1910s and removed after the completion of the Mayfield Dam in 1963, while the road from Harmony to Mossyrock was built in the 1940s. The roadway was later reconstructed and designated in 1991 as SR 122, a number previously used on the route of SR 142 until 1967.

== Major intersections ==
The entire highway is in Lewis County.

Location	mi	km	Destinations	Notes
Silver Creek	0.00	0.00	US 12 – Salkum, Mossyrock	Western terminus
Mossyrock	7.88	12.68	US 12 – Salkum, Morton	Eastern terminus, continues as Williams Street
1.000 mi = 1.609 km; 1.000 km = 0.621 mi
