= Swofford, Washington =

Unincorporated community in Washington, United States

- Unincorporated community
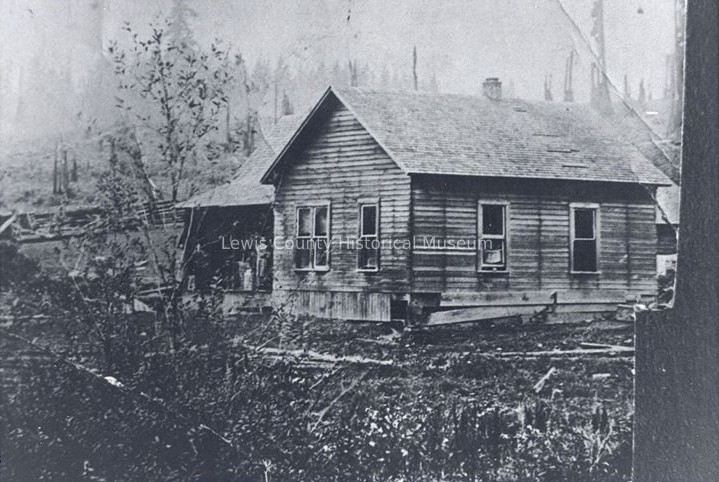
- Davis Home and Post Office, Swofford, Washington, c. 1900

- Location within Washington (state) Location within the United States
- Coordinates: 46°30′18″N 122°23′18″W
- Country: United States
- State: Washington
- County: Lewis
- Established: 1890
- Elevation: 778 ft (237 m)
- Time zone: UTC-8 (Pacific (PST))
  - Summer (DST): UTC-7 (PDT)
- ZIP Code: 98564
- Area code(s): 360, 564
- GNIS source - Swofford Valley

Swofford, also known as Swofford Valley, is an unincorporated community in central Lewis County, in the U.S. state of Washington. Swofford is situated on the south shore of Riffe Lake, southeast of Mossyrock.

== History ==
The valley was first settled by farmers Thomas and Jennie Swofford and their children in 1887 after a migration journey from Illinois. Thomas purchased 160 acres (65 ha) in the center of the valley. The family created the post office in their home and opened a drug store, thereby naming the town. (Note: Thomas' son, Harry Swofford, is often given credit, in later news reports, for the valley and community being named after him rather than the Swofford family.) When the office and store were shut down, the building was converted into a dance hall. The Swoffords eventually moved to nearby Mossyrock; Thomas died in early 1924 and Jennie died on August 1, 1932. Their son, Harry Swofford, became a state representative and senator, and continued to live in the area until his death in 1970. A valley pioneer farmer, postmaster, and father to a Centralia mayor, D.C. Davis lived in Swofford for 65 years.

The first recorded airplane flight in Swofford Valley was reported in 1920 and there were joking concerns that farmers would get stiff necks if more aircraft were flown overhead. In the 1920s, the community had an organized grange.

=== Post office ===
A post office called Swofford was established in 1890, and remained in operation until May 1922; mail was available for pick-up at the post office in the nearby community of Ajlune. Indigenous people, using horses, helped to deliver mail in the surrounding area over existing Native American trails before a county road connecting to the communities of Ajlune and Riffe was built. Members of the Swofford family were postmasters continuously since its inception until Jennie Swofford resigned in 1909; the postmaster job was routinely vacated by the late 1910s.

The community was referred to as Swafford in local news articles near its beginnings and was the original post office listing for the community. The post office name was corrected to Swofford in 1891. Reports often switched between Swafford and Swofford in the same article and the Swafford spelling continued into the 2010s.

== Geography ==
Swofford sits on the south shore of Riffe Lake, approximately 4.0 miles (6.4 km) southeast of Mossyrock.

The valley is known for farming and the land considered to consist of meadows amid rolling hills. Swofford Pond is fed by Sulphur Creek. In the early days of farming, the valley contained various orchards.

== Parks and recreation ==
Swofford is home to Swofford Pond, a 240-acre (97 ha) lake. Once known as Swofford Valley Pond, it increased in size after the flooding of the surrounding region due to the creation of the Mossyrock Dam. The pond was first planned as a park in the late 1960s, and the waters are accessible by boat launch. The shallow lake contains such fish species as bass, bluegill, catfish, crappie, perch, and sturgeon. Trout, specifically brown and rainbow, are stocked and the pond is usually accessible throughout the year for fishing.

Paralleling the south shore of the pond is the Swofford Pond Trail, established over an old logging road. The mostly flat, approximately 3.0-mile (4.8 km) out-and-back trail courses through a mixed coniferous and hardwood forest with several open areas. The trail provides viewing of several species of birds, such as ducks, eagles and ospreys, and the area is visited by deer, elk, and otters.

Sulphur Creek, which drains into Swofford Pond, is home to Sulphur Creek Falls. The two-tier horsetail waterfall, with a total height of 186 feet (56.7 m), flows over part of a bluff connected to a 100 foot (30 m) rock column known locally as "Devil's Tower". (Note: The name of the rock column near Sulphur Creek Falls, "Devil's Tower", is considered to have been named by a local family.) The falls are approximately 0.25 miles (0.40 km) south of the Swofford Pond Trail on a separate, unmarked trail. The area contains devil's club and salmon berry.

Additional recreation includes a campground at Riffe Lake and Mossyrock Park.

== Economy ==
A farming community, the early economy in Swofford centered on hog farming. Settlers drove the pigs, in a similar manner to that of cattle, to markets in Chehalis.

== Education ==
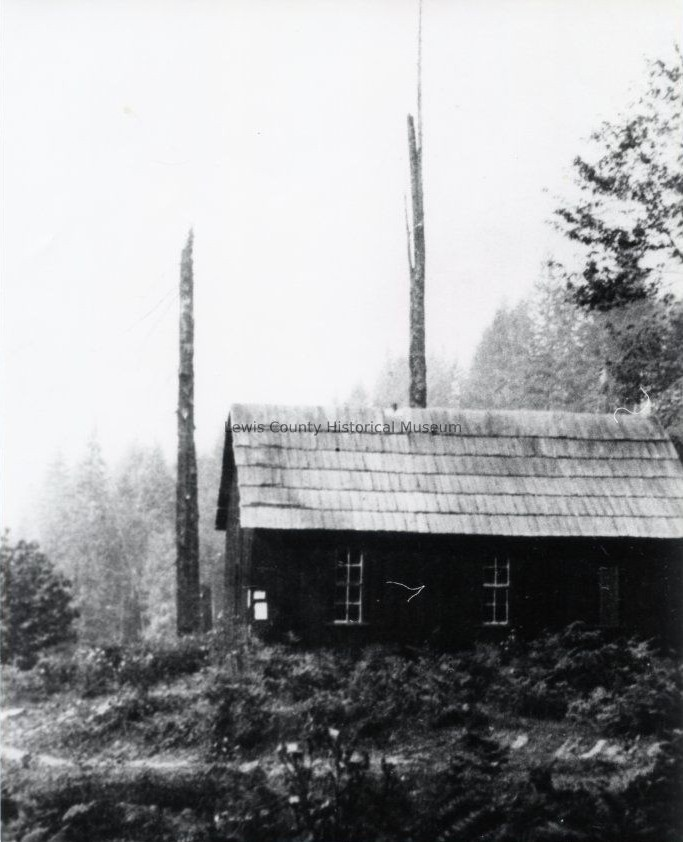
Herrington schoolhouse, Swofford, c. 1900

The Swofford school was part of district no. 66 and enrollment was small-to-moderate, with a 1903 report listing 37 students. The one-room schoolhouse was located on a homestead farm. The Swofford school building was still in use for religious gatherings in the 1950s.

== Infrastructure ==
In the early days of the Swofford community, a trip to Chehalis and other towns was accomplished by use of a dirt road and travel over a wooden bridge in Mayfield. By 1900, the main route to Chehalis was a 4 in (10 cm) thick, 8 foot (2.4 metres) wide plank road that also contained stretches of gravel and rock. The same year, the community requested the county and state fund the build of a better rock road. A county road was built beginning in 1915, connecting Swofford to local communities, such as Ajlune and Riffe, and continuing on to Morton. In continuing to develop the central Lewis County area around the Cowlitz River, Swofford joined with other nearby towns, such as Harmony, Mayfield, and Nesika, to form the Cowlitz Valley Civic League, with the intent to construct an interconnecting road system. Residents in Swofford undertook the construction of a 5,000 foot (1,500 metres) drainage ditch to siphon water off the valley for additional land for farming. A county road, built over a logging route, was constructed in the mid-1950s to connect Swofford to nearby Winston Creek.

Swofford Pond, beginning in 1966-1967, was originally a holding and rearing hatchery used to help offset fish losses due to difficulties in aquatic migration around the dams in the area. The site was part of the larger Cowlitz Fish Hatchery project, considered at the time to be the largest such in the world.
