= Rose of Cimarron =

Rose of Cimarron may refer to:

- Rose Dunn or Rose of the Cimarron, an American outlaw of the Old West
- Rose of Cimarron (film), a 1952 film directed by Harry Keller
- Rose of Cimarron (album), a 1976 album by Poco
  - "Rose of Cimarron" (song), the title song
