= Crazy Love (Poco song) =

Single by Poco

from the album Legend
- B-side: "Barbados"
- Released: January 1979
- Recorded: April–August 1978
- Studio: Crystal Sound Studios (Hollywood)
- Genre: Soft rock; country rock
- Length: 2:55
- Label: ABC
- Songwriter: Rusty Young
- Producer: Richard Sanford Orshoff

Poco singles chronology
"Indian Summer" (1977)	"Crazy Love" (1979)	"Heart of the Night" (1979)

"Crazy Love" is a song by the country rock group Poco introduced on the 1978 album Legend. Written by founding group member Rusty Young, "Crazy Love" was the first single by Poco to reach the top 40 and remained the group's biggest hit, with a special impact as an Adult Contemporary hit, being ranked by Billboard as the No. 2 AC song for the year 1979.

== Composition ==
In 2012, Young would thus recall his writing "Crazy Love": "I was living in Los Angeles, working on my house one day" - "I was paneling a wall and looking out over the valley in L.A. and the chorus came into my head" - "I always had a guitar close at hand. It took about thirty minutes to write that song, because it was all there. It was kind of a gift." Young added that the "'Ooh, ooh, Ahhhh haaa' part" of the chorus was a stopgap he intended to replace with formal lyrics but the musicians who first backed Young on the song told him: "Don't do that, that's the way it's supposed to be."

In a July 17, 2011, broadcast of the Original 70s Soundtrack on urockradio.net, Young would say of his writing "Crazy Love: "for the first big hit - the only really huge hit Poco's had - [to be] a song that I wrote and sang is pretty ironic" - "When the band started all I did was [play] steel guitar and banjo and dobro and that kind of stuff: I was the instrumentalist in the band - I didn't sing and I didn't write....But I've always said that with the band what happened is that as people have left the band it's left room for others to grow. I had great teachers: Richie Furay; Neil [Young] and Stephen Stills [of Buffalo Springfield] were around in the beginning [and] I could listen to them writing songs, working on songs and how they did it. Jimmy [Messina] taught me really a lot about the whole recording process and writing poems. I just had these great teachers that I was around."

== Rusty Young's background in Poco ==
Having played steel guitar on the track "Kind Woman" on the final Buffalo Springfield album Last Time Around (1968), Rusty Young was invited by Buffalo Springfield departing members Richie Furay and Jim Messina to join them along with George Grantham and Randy Meisner in forming Poco. After earning only three writing credits over the course of the band's first six albums, Young first raised his songwriting profile on the eighth Poco release Cantamos in 1974. By then, Poco had morphed into a four-man band consisting of founding members Rusty Young and George Grantham along with Timothy B. Schmit and Paul Cotton, who had joined the band in 1969 and 1970, respectively . The ninth Poco album release Head Over Heels (1975) marked Young's debut as a lead vocalist on the song "Us." The 1977 Poco album release Indian Summer featured Young singing lead on "Downfall." Other than instrumentals, his previous compositions for Poco prior to Legend featured Schmit as lead vocalist; on the 1976 Young composition "Rose of Cimarron", Schmit sang co-lead with Cotton.

== Legend/ "Crazy Love" ==
=== Background ===
By the time of the May 1977 release of the album Indian Summer Timothy B. Schmit had been recruited to join the Eagles: Schmit remained with Poco for their Indian Summer tour whose Santa Monica Civic Auditorium edition in July 1977 was recorded as The Last Roundup, intended to be released as Poco's final album. In 1978 Rusty Young and Paul Cotton auditioned for Poco's label ABC Records in hopes of being allowed to record an album together: in Young's words he and Cotton "got a little rehearsal hall, put together a band, and played...'Crazy Love' and 'Heart of the Night'" - the latter a Paul Cotton composition - for ABC Records executives "who said go ahead, make a record". Recorded at Crystal City Studios (Los Angeles) between April and August 1978, the resultant project was intended to be credited to the Cotton-Young Band: however ABC Records elected to have Young and Cotton along with two sidemen who'd backed them at Crystal City - drummer Steve Chapman and bassist Charlie Harrison - continue as Poco (keyboardist Kim Bullard joined Poco by the year's end), with The Last Roundup being shelved and the Crystal City tracks issued as the twelfth album release from Poco in November 1978, under the title Legend.

=== Release and reception ===
Issued as a single in January 1979, "Crazy Love" debuted at No. 72 on the Billboard Hot 100 dated 20 January 1979 and rose into the top 40 within four weeks. Losing traction in the top 30, "Crazy Love" would in March 1979 spend three weeks in the top 20 peaking at No. 17 before beginning a rapid chart descent of the Hot 100. It has been alleged that the February 1979 takeover of ABC Records by MCA arrested the surge in Poco's popularity, MCA not being interested in the group: (LA Times 27 April 1979 quote from "a source close to ABC":) "[Poco]'s sales would be better now if that change [ie. ABC's takeover by MCA] hadn't happened. Poco's records really suffered. Those guys are hexed." ("Crazy Love"'s parent album Legend would still manage to reach No. 14 on the Billboard album chart in April 1979, being that month certified as a gold record for sales of 500,000 units.)

"Crazy Love" would spend seven weeks at the No. 1 position on the airplay-focused Adult Contemporary chart in Billboard, whose year-end tally would rank "Crazy Love" as the No. 2 Adult Contemporary hit for 1979. Grazing the Billboard C&W chart (#95), "Crazy Love" would have a Canadian hit parade tenure with a No. 15 peak, becoming Poco's second charting single in Australia with a No. 73 peak (leaving "Rose of Cimarron" - #49 in 1976 - as Poco's Australian chart best).

Record World said that it "has a light acoustic flavor and a lovely harmony hook."

Although Poco would have three subsequent top 40 hits, all of which reached the Adult Contemporary chart's top ten, "Crazy Love" remained the band's signature song; in a 2008 interview promoting an upcoming Poco gig, Rusty Young stated: "The only reason we're [ie. Young and the interviewer] talking now is 'Crazy Love'. That was our first hit single. It's a classic, and it still pays the mortgage."

=== Charts ===
Chart (1979)	Peak position
Australia (Kent Music Report)	73
Canada Top Singles (RPM)	15
Canada Adult Contemporary (RPM)	4
US Billboard Hot 100	17
US Adult Contemporary (Billboard)	1
US Hot Country Songs (Billboard)	95
US (Radio & Records)	7

== See also ==
- List of number-one adult contemporary singles of 1979 (U.S.)
