= Alta Vista, Washington =

Unincorporated community in Washington, United States

- Unincorporated community
- Green Mountain School, near Alta Vista, pre-1930s

- Location within Washington (state) Location within the United States
- Coordinates: 46°29′58.39″N 122°22′20.38″W
- Country: United States
- State: Washington
- County: Lewis
- Established: 1913
- Time zone: UTC-8 (Pacific (PST))
  - Summer (DST): UTC-7 (PDT)
- Area code(s): 360, 564
- GNIS feature ID: 1515766

Alta Vista is an unincorporated community in Lewis County, in the U.S. state of Washington.

The small community is located near Riffe Lake and is approximately southeast of the unincorporated communities of Ajlune and Swofford, as well as the city of Mossyrock. Alta Vista established a post office in 1913 that remained in operation into 1920. The community became briefly known as Montgreen when a post office was reestablished in 1926.

== History ==
Residents of Alta Vista joined other nearby towns, including Harmony, Mossyrock, and Swofford, Washington, to form the Cowlitz Valley Civic League in 1917. The group focused on road improvements and other efforts for the "advancement and development" of the region. Later in 1927, a three-person committee representing the farming community attended a hearing with the Lewis County commissioner board asking for further upgrades to roads in the area. Travel to and from Alta Vista was deemed by the committee to be "utterly impossible" during the winter season, threatening crop harvesting as threshers could not access farms.

Alta Vista was described in 1921 to be "quite a little settlement" located "up on the hill" near Riffe. The community, commonly referred to as Green Mountain by older settlers in the area, was noted to be amongst the "finest timber and farm lands" in the area and by 1926, the population was recorded to consist of 15 families. The next year, the family count was reported to have increased to sixteen.

In August 1952, possibly up to four practice bombs were accidentally dropped from a "small jet bomber" on the forested lands near Alta Vista. The accident was thought to be due to a "defective mechanism" in the training armaments. The explosions caused no injuries or deaths, nor led to any forest fires. Only one person, a camp watchman for the Long-Bell Lumber Company, was in the vicinity of the blast area.

=== Post offices ===
Due to poor road conditions and unsafe travel, mail delivery to Alta Vista was suspended in August 1913. A post office in Alta Vista was established in early October; the first postmaster was Oliver Workman. The postmaster position was noted to be vacant by October 1919 and the office was discontinued after April 1920. (Note: The exact day the Alta Vistas post office was discontinued is not explicitly listed in local news reports. In an April 1920 issue of The Chehalis Bee-Nugget, the closure was planned to be "at an early date". The newspaper reported by September 1921 that the post office had been closed.) A post office in Riffe delivered mail to Alta Vista afterwards.

A reopening of the Alta Vista post office was planned by May 1926. The community became briefly known as Montgreen after a reestablishment of the office by August 1926. (Note: Other news reports at the time state that Montgreen was established in October 1926. See sources throughout the section for the discrepancy.) Providing service three days per week, the office was located in the "hill district" east of Ajlune; the first postmaster was Frank Hildreth. (Note: The Montgreen postmaster's name has been spelled under the initials "F.B." or "F.D.". The last name is also spelled as Heldreth. The post office was either located at his home or place of business.) By October the following year, Hildreth had announced his resignation, placing the Montgreen office into possible closure.

== Geography ==
The unincorporated community is located approximately 3 miles (4.8 km) south of Riffe, Washington, near Green Mountain and Riffe Lake. While under the name of Montgreen, the community was further established to be located "but a short distance" from the headwater of Winston Creek.

== Economy ==
During the early 20th century, farming was the main economic factor in Alta Vista; the "very fine country" with a "splendid climate" was conducive to agriculture. Main crops in the community were corn and potatoes. A Weyerhaeuser log mill, which produced 2x4 boards, was located on Green Mountain and in operation during the mid-1970s.

== Education ==
Students in the Alta Vista-Montgreen area attended Green Mountain School, a one-room schoolhouse. The building, which contained a bell tower, was converted into a residence in the 1930s. The school's bell was eventually relocated to a church in the Richland Valley near Mossyrock.
