= H. H. Swofford =

American politician

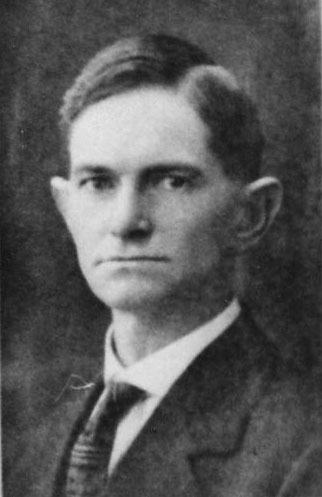
- Swofford in 1917

Member of the Washington House of Representatives for the 27th district
- In office 1917–1921

Member of the Washington State Senate for the 20th district
- In office 1921–1925

Personal details
- Born: February 4, 1873 Desoto, Illinois, United States
- Died: December 29, 1970 (aged 97) Chehalis, Washington, United States
- Party: Republican

Harry Hudson Swofford (February 4, 1873 – December 29, 1970) was an American politician in the state of Washington. He served in the Washington House of Representatives and Washington State Senate.

== Early life ==
Swofford was born in Desoto, Illinois on February 4, 1873. He migrated with his family to a homestead in Washington state that became the community of Swofford. Harry, rather than his parents Thomas and Jennie, was often given credit for naming the town in later reports. Swofford attended the University of Washington, enrolling in 1893.

== Career ==
In addition to his duties as a public servant, Swofford was a businessman, farmer, and postmaster, and was an active member in several social clubs in Lewis County, Washington. He served as an auditor in the county beginning approximately in 1905. He quickly earned notoriety as the "most cussed and discussed man in Lewis County", once refusing to allow county funds to be used for the creation of the Southwest Washington Fairgrounds. Swofford considered the funding a state issue and a legal dispute was ignited. The Washington Supreme Court sided with Swofford.

== Personal life and death ==
In 1905, Swofford married Susan Hendricks from Mossyrock and they had a daughter and a son. The family eventually moved to Chehalis. He died on December 29, 1970 at a hospital in Chehalis.
