= Rose Dunn =

American Old West outlaw

Rose Elizabeth Dunn (September 5, 1878 – June 11, 1955) also known as Rose of Cimarron and later Rose of the Cimarron, was best known for her good looks and for her romantic involvement with outlaw George "Bitter Creek" Newcomb when she was a teenager during the closing years of the Old West.

== Early life ==
Rose Dunn was born in Winfield, Kansas, on September 5, 1878. The daughter of William and Sarah Catherine Dunn, she is found in the U.S. Census of 1880 and the 1885 Kansas State Census living in Kansas with her large family. Her family was poor, but she received a formal education at a convent in Wichita, Kansas.

By 1893, her father had died. She moved with her mother and stepfather to Ingalls, Oklahoma Territory. Dunn's two older brothers became minor outlaws by the time she was 12. She learned to ride, rope and shoot from her brothers. Through them, she allegedly met and became involved romantically with George Newcomb circa 1893, when she was either 14 or 15 years of age.

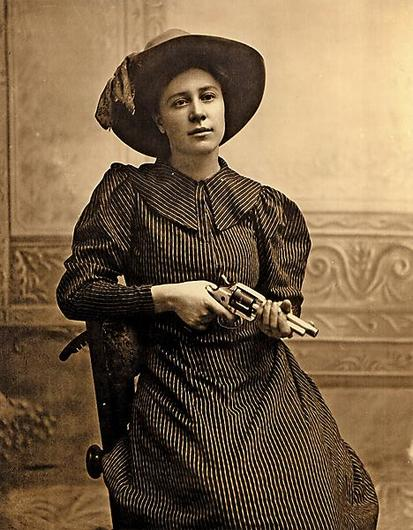
For many years, many believed that the woman on this photo was Rose Dunn. Actually, she was a prisoner who posed to illustrate a story about the Rose of the Cimarron.

== George "Bitter Creek" Newcomb ==
Dunn reportedly met and became involved romantically with George "Bitter Creek" Newcomb around 1893. The gang that Newcomb ran with worshiped her due to her good looks and her calm and kind demeanor, and were fiercely defensive of her, spawning her loyalty to them. She was completely infatuated with Newcomb and began supporting Newcomb's outlaw life by venturing into town for supplies, as he was a wanted man and could not. Newcomb was then riding with the Wild Bunch gang led by outlaw Bill Doolin. By this time her brothers had left the outlaw life and had become bounty hunters, calling themselves the Dunn Brothers.

== Gang involvement ==
On September 1, 1893, the gang was cornered in Ingalls by a posse of US marshals, in what became known as the Battle of Ingalls, resulting in an intense shootout. A western legend has it that Newcomb was badly wounded, and while he lay in the street, Dunn is alleged to have run from the "Pierce Hotel" to him with two belts of ammunition and a Winchester rifle. She fired the rifle at the marshals while Newcomb reloaded his revolvers, and Newcomb was able to escape. However, that account has never been verified, and was never mentioned by the US Marshal official report, which indicated that Newcomb at best fired two shots then fled.

Three deputy marshals were killed during the shootout. Newcomb and Charley Pierce were wounded, but escaped. Gang member "Arkansas Tom" Jones was wounded and captured by Deputy Marshal Jim Masterson (Note: Brother of Bat Masterson.) Together with Newcomb and other members of the gang, Dunn hid out for at least two months nursing the remaining gang members back to health.

By 1895, Newcomb had a $5,000 bounty placed on him, dead or alive. Newcomb and Pierce hid out near Norman, Oklahoma, both of them having been wounded in a gun battle with US marshals. On May 2, 1895, the Dunn Brothers shot and killed both Newcomb and Pierce as they dismounted in front of the Dunn house to visit Rose. The brothers collected the bounty, believed to have been $5,000 each.

== Later life ==
After the killing of Newcomb, Dunn was often accused of having set him up, revealing to her brothers where the outlaws were hiding. She denied this, and her brothers later defended her, stating that she had no knowledge of their intentions, nor did she reveal the hideout to them. She was never prosecuted for her involvement with the gang. Her short outlaw life launched her to the level of western legend.

In 1898, she married local politician Charles Albert Noble, and sometime after 1900 they left Oklahoma and all outlaw associations behind them. Charles Noble died in 1930, and she then married Richard Fleming (whom she had first met in Ingalls when she was 16). in 1946.

Dunn died in 1955 at the age of 76 in Salkum, Washington.

== In pop culture ==
The name "Rose of Cimarron" (not that of Rose Dunn) first came to popular attention with the publication of Bill Tilghman's booklet, Oklahoma Outlaws. Tilghman had written and filmed a silent movie about the pursuit and capture of various outlaw gang members across the state; the pamphlet, copies of which are still extant, told the story of the lawmen and outlaws of this era of the new territory, then state, of Oklahoma. They were sold or handed out at viewings of Tilghman's film.

The Cimarron is a river that flows through much of Oklahoma.

"Rose of Cimarron" is a song by country rock band Poco and the title cut of their 1976 album release Rose of Cimarron. Written by founding member Rusty Young, the song features lead vocals by Paul Cotton and Timothy B. Schmit. The song is about Dunn.
