= Legend (Poco album) =

- Cover by Phil Hartman

Studio album by Poco
- Released: November 1978
- Recorded: April–August 1978
- Studios: Crystal Sound Studios (Hollywood, California); The Village Recorder (Los Angeles, California)
- Genre: Country rock
- Length: 37:54
- Label: ABC
- Producer: Richard Sanford Orshoff

Poco chronology
Indian Summer (1977)	Legend (1978)	Under the Gun (1980)

Singles from Legend
- 1. "Crazy Love" b/w "Barbados" Released: January 1979; 2. "Heart of the Night" b/w "The Last Goodbye" Released: May 1979; 3. "Legend" b/w "Indian Summer" Released: September 1979

Legend is the eleventh studio album by the American country rock band Poco, released in 1978.

== Background ==
After ABC Records canceled the 1977 release of Poco's planned 13th album: the live set The Last Roundup, the three remaining members of the band: Rusty Young, Paul Cotton and George Grantham, agreed to the suspension of Poco as a recording or performing outfit. By 1978 Young, a founding member of Poco from 1968, and Cotton, with Poco since 1970, had decided to launch as essentially a duo act, ABC Records greenlighting the recording of the intended debut album of the Cotton-Young Band. Although Poco had self-produced the group's six studio album releases plus one live album release between 1974 and 1977, Cotton and Young elected to have the Cotton-Young Band sessions - recorded in the summer of 1978 at Crystal Sound Studio in Hollywood - overseen by Richard Sanford Orshoff, feeling an "outside" producer dealing with the recording process and with ABC Records would allow Cotton and Young to focus strictly on their songs. Young and Cotton also deferred to Orshoff in regards to which songs proffered for the album were actually recorded and included on it, Orshoff nixing some bluegrass songs composed by Rusty Young which (Rusty Young quote:)"would probably have...made the album too country...for the pop market."

November 1978 saw the release of the Cotton-Young Band recordings as Legend the eleventh studio album by Poco, ABC having decided to continue the "brand" of Cotton and Young's supposedly defunct outfit, two sidemen from the Cotton-Young Band sessions: drummer Steve Chapman and bassist Charlie Harrison, being afforded tenure in a new Poco lineup (and veteran Poco drummer George Grantham thus being ousted from the group). Shortly after the release of Legend, Kim Bullard was recruited as keyboardist in Poco's new lineup (Legend had featured session keyboardist Tom Stephenson).

After spending eight weeks in the lower half of the Billboard 200 album chart, Legend was afforded a boost with the release in mid-January 1979 of the track "Crazy Love" as a single which debuted at number 72 on the Billboard Hot 100 dated 20 January 1979 and rose into the Top 40 within four weeks. "Crazy Love" was to eventually stall at number 17 but the cachet of generating a Top 40 hit - Poco's first - was enough to propel the Legend album into the Top 20 of the Billboard 200. Peaking at number 14 on the Billboard 200 dated 7 April 1979, Legend would the next week be certified as a Gold record for sales of 500,000 units: according to Rusty Young, sales for Poco's precedent albums had typically hovered between 200,000 and 300,000 units. The breakout success of Legend was attributed by some to the efforts of ABC's promotional staff to prove their value to MCA Records who absorbed ABC in February 1979. An alternate contention is that Legend and its "Crazy Love" single began breaking out prior to ABC's takeover by MCA, the latter label taking a counterproductive uninterest in Poco: (LA Times 27 April 1979 quote from "a source close to ABC":) "[Poco]'s sales would be better now if that change [ie. ABC's takeover by MCA] hadn't happened. Poco's records really suffered. Those guys are hexed."

Legend would also generate a second Top 20 hit: "Heart of the Night", written and sung by Paul Cotton, meaning that Legend afforded both of Poco's veteran members a hit single, "Crazy Love" being written and sung by Rusty Young. The title track, another Rusty Young number, would prove a Hot 100 shortfall as a third single.

The iconic cover art for Legend was done by Phil Hartman, the brother of Poco manager John Hartmann; Phil Hartman worked as a graphic designer creating album covers for his brother's clients (including America) while attempting to break out as a comic.

== Reception ==
Professional ratings
Review scores
Source	Rating
AllMusic	3.5/5 stars
The Encyclopedia of Popular Music	3/5 stars
The Rolling Stone Album Guide	2.5/5 stars

Contemporary reviews of Legend typically noted how the album evinced the shedding of Poco's country rock provenance: The Philadelphia Inquirer considered that Poco had shifted "emphasis to an extremely tasty straight-on pop-rock, nicely executed with strong vocals and pretty harmonies." Stuart Goldman of the Los Angeles Times was less enamored of the band's new direction: "The songs on 'Legend' are well crafted. The hooks are strong and the guitar breaks concise. But the end result is vapid and spiritless. Gone are Young's soaring steel guitar lines and Cotton's ultrathin voice quickly becomes irritating. The lyrics to the tunes - fraught with 'easy evenin' breezes', 'cool southern rain', and 'faded memories' - simply aren't tolerable without the livelier stance [Poco] used to take." Record World praised the title track for its "stinging lead guitar, bulldozer rhythm and clean lead vocals."

In his AllMusic review, music critic Bruce Eder wrote, "Listening to parts of this album, one gets the sense that, with the arrival of Charlie Harrison (bass, harmony vocals) and Steve Chapman (drums) in the group, Poco was deliberately adopting a change in sound similar to what the Eagles went through when Joe Walsh joined, into much harder rocking territory, at least part of the time." He called "Heart of the Night" "one of the most finely crafted songs in the group's history."

== Track listing ==
1. "Boomerang" (Paul Cotton) – 3:48
2. "Spellbound" (Rusty Young) – 5:13
3. "Barbados" (Paul Cotton) – 3:31
4. "Little Darlin’" (Rusty Young) – 3:47
5. "Love Comes Love Goes" (Rusty Young) – 3:55
6. "Heart of the Night" (Paul Cotton) – 4:49
7. "Crazy Love" (Rusty Young) – 2:55
8. "The Last Goodbye" (Rusty Young) – 5:40
9. "Legend" (Rusty Young) – 4:16

== Personnel ==
Poco

- Paul Cotton – lead guitar, vocals
- Rusty Young – steel guitar, guitars, vocals
- Charlie Harrison – bass, harmony vocals
- Steve Chapman – drums

Additional musicians

- Tom Stephenson – keyboards (1, 3, 5)
- Jai Winding – keyboards
- Michael Boddicker – synthesizers
- Steve Forman – percussion
- Phil Kenzie – alto saxophone
- David Campbell – string arrangements

== Production ==
- Producer – Richard Sanford Orshoff
- Production Assistant – Linda Safin
- Engineer – David Henson
- Assistant Engineers – Jim Hill and Barbara Issak
- Mixing – Joe Chiccarelli
- Album Artwork – Phil Hartman

== Charts ==
=== Weekly charts ===
Chart (1978–1979)	Peak position
Australia (Kent Music Report)	52
Canada Top Albums/CDs (RPM)	12
US Billboard Top LPs	14

=== Year-end charts ===
Chart (1979)	Position
Canada Top Albums/CDs (RPM)	66
US Billboard 200	21

== Certifications ==
Region	Certification	Certified units/sales
United States (RIAA)	Gold	500,000^{^}
^{^} Shipments figures based on certification alone.
