= Ajlune, Washington =

Unincorporated community in Washington, United States

- Unincorporated community
- Richland Valley School in Ajlune, c. 1912

- Location within Washington (state) Location within the United States
- Coordinates: 46°30′55.39″N 122°26′5.39″W
- Country: United States
- State: Washington
- County: Lewis
- Established: June 29, 1914
- Founder: Ghosn Tonios Wassai Ghosn
- Named for: Ajaltoun
- Time zone: UTC-8 (Pacific (PST))
  - Summer (DST): UTC-7 (PDT)
- ZIP Code: 98542 (Note: After the implementation of the Zip Code system in 1963, Ajlune's assigned code was 98523.)
- Area code(s): 360, 564
- GNIS feature ID: 1515765

Ajlune is an unincorporated community in Lewis County, Washington, United States. The community is situated near Riffe Lake and located approximately southeast of Mossyrock.

Ajlune was founded by Ghosn Tonios Wassai Ghosn, a Lebanese immigrant from the Syrian Arab Republic, after he established a post office in 1914. Ghosn named the town after Ajaltoun. The post office, similar to others in the area after the completion of the Mossyrock Dam, closed in 1968.

Two historic churches, the Richland Valley Church of the Brethren and the "Church on the Plank", were constructed in Ajlune. A recreation site in Ajlune, known as Mossyrock Park, was built on the shore of Riffe Lake in the 1970s.

== Etymology ==
Ajlune was named by its founder, Ghosn Tonios Wassai Ghosn, after his hometown of Ajaltoun in Lebanon. The Ajlune name is sometimes spelled as Ajloun or Ajlun.

The original name was derived from an Egyptian story regarding a dream by a king of Egypt, known as Ptolimis the Fifth. (Note: Sources reporting on the beginnings of Ajaltoun refer to the story as a myth, and at times state that the legend is traced back to as far as 150 BCE. See sources in the section.) Under either the guidance or direction of a female deity, Ptolimis was to travel by camel, which was to be dressed in the finest fabrics and jewels, into the desert. The camel was to kneel six times at different locations; the number was synonymous to the number of sons of either the ruler or the Mother of God. At each kneeling site, a temple was to be constructed; one temple was built at Ajaltoun, named after the third son of either the deity or the king.

== History ==
Ajlune was founded by Ghosn Tonios Wassai Ghosn, (Note: Ghosn's full name is often shortened to Ghosn Ghosn in sourcing. See sources throughout the article.) a Lebanese immigrant born in the Syrian Arab Republic in 1878. Ghosn moved to Lewis County in 1908 and in 1910, opened a general store in the Richland Valley, approximately 3 miles (4.8 km) south of Mossyrock near the present-day site of Mossyrock Dam. He became a naturalized citizen.

As the area lacked a post office, Ghosn established an office under the name of Ajlune on June 29, 1914 and served as the first postmaster. (Note: In an article about the opening of the Ajlune post office in 1914, The Tacoma Times hypothesized that Ghosn was the first, and only, Syrian-born postmaster in the United States.) During the transcription of Ghosn's request for a post office, Congressman Albert Johnson incorrectly spelled the name as "Aglure". Further complicating matters, several prominent businessmen and newspaper correspondents, in attempts to help or explain, theorized on Ghosn's behalf that the name of Ajlune was based other topics. Moniker theories included that it was from a Greek or Roman god, the Middle Eastern location was connected to a biblical story, or that Ghosn meant a different, but similar name, such as Majnun. Ghosn, who believed his moniker choice was one of "enlightenment" and was "no joke", was reported to be irate over "flippancy" and "laughing up" during the issue; he wrote detailed letters explaining the backstory regarding the name of Ajlune, and the matter was considered "rested".

Farmers in Ajlune built a community hall next to the post office in 1916. Ghosn remained as postmaster into December 1919. (Note: Ghosn attempted to resign as postmaster by November 1919, hoping to transfer duties to his assistant, Adele Stillings. He was told he could not do so, unless he moved to Mossyrock as a permanent resident and "quit Ajlune cold". Stillings was officially recognized as postmaster in January 1920.) Ghosn moved to Mossyrock in 1922, opening other stores and businesses; he later expanded his general store chain to four locations, including in Salkum. He died in 1968.

With the closure of the Riffe post office due to the build of Mossyrock Dam, the Ajlune star route handled mail for Riffe residents beginning in 1966. The Ajlune post office closed on December 27, 1968. By 1976, a wooden postal window once located at the Ajlune office was displayed at the Old Settler Museum in Morton.

=== Gold and oil discovery ===
In October 1922, rumors began circulating that oil had been found in Ajlune. Workers excavating at an Ajlune store near the National Park Highway had noticed a "sandy substance" similar to that of natural oil seepage. The Ajlune Oil and Mining Company (AOMC) was incorporated in December 1923 and test wells were planned. The company offered stock at $5 per share to fund the early tests. (Note: The Ajlune Oil and Mining Company, also known as the Ajlune Oil and Refining Company, Inc., also planned for oil drilling near Littell, and advertised for an opportunity to purchase stock in the company by printing a mail-in coupon in The Chehalis Bee-Nugget.) By March 1925, studies and early prospecting located a main source of oil within sand and clay layers at the "hillside back of the garage at Ajlune"; the property was owned by a pioneer of the town, Joe Rea. Gold and silver were also were discovered, with early predictions of 4.94 ounces (140 g) and 6.06 ounces (172 g) per ton, respectively.

The discovery of gold, oil, and silver led to "dozens" of interested experts and parties to visit Ajlune. Numerous claims and leases were "hastily filed" for drilling and mining by March 1925, encompassing a 5,000-acre (2,000 ha) area. (Note: Early claim attempts were considered to lack "any force whatsoever" due to the area already being under private ownership or deed. Portions of the oil lands were owned by Weyerhaeuser.) Claims for quartz mining were also filed. An oil man from Kansas was reported to have stated that the prospects of oil "was a most phenomenal one". The following month, Herschel Clifford Parker, who created a report after having visited the Ajlune fields, stated "unreservedly" that oil will be found in large quantities.

The Ajlune Oil and Mining Company was reorganized into the Chehalis Oil & Gas Company in March 1926, focusing on drilling in the Chehalis area.

== Geography ==
Ajlune is located in Richland Valley, near Riffe Lake. The community is situated approximately southeast of Mossyrock, and west of Swofford and Alta Vista.

A levee, approximately 800 feet (240 m) in length and 10–12 feet (3.0–3.7 m) tall, was constructed in a saddle near a natural spring outside of Ajlune. Begun in 1964 as part of the construction of the Mossyrock Dam, the earthen structure was required under the license issued by the Federal Power Commission. The levee, theorized to never be of use, was to hold back a "flood control surcharge", or an unusually high flood.

== Arts and culture ==
Located on Swofford Road is the historic Richland Valley Church of the Brethren, built in 1919. (Note: Sources also state that the Church of the Brethren was begun in 1917. A 50th anniversary was held in 1969 with sources mentioning that the congregation officially organized on August 16, 1919.) By 2017, the congregation was reported to have "kind of died out" and the church was noted to be "essentially abandoned". The Protestant church was founded by Centralian Rev. Ezra Whisler and his wife after the couple separately heard a voice stating, "You'd better go home". The pastor's family was living in Chicago at the time while Whisler attended a seminary. The Whislers moved to Ajlune and began the process of beginning a congregation.

Between Ajlune and Mossyrock on Jarvis Road was the "Church on the Plank", a Baptist congregation. The church, which had been active since the early 1900s and was later used as a meeting hall, was named after the plank road, which at the time, was the main highway through the area. The structure was noted to still be in existence in 1976.

== Parks and recreation ==
A park on the shore of what was then known as Davisson Lake was approved for construction in 1973. The site, built by Tacoma City Light, became known as Mossyrock Park. Until the park was completed, boaters accessed the new reservoir created by the dam by using an "old stretch of highway" that terminated in the waters. A boat dock was installed in mid-1974.

== Economy ==
A "bulk fuel" plant located in Ajlune was constructed in the late 1930s. The facility remained in operation until the end of 1963; the owners shifted production to a new plant in Mossyrock.

== Education ==
The Richland Valley School, a two-room schoolhouse, was located in Ajlune.
