= Ike Kinswa State Park =

State park in Lewis County, Washington, US

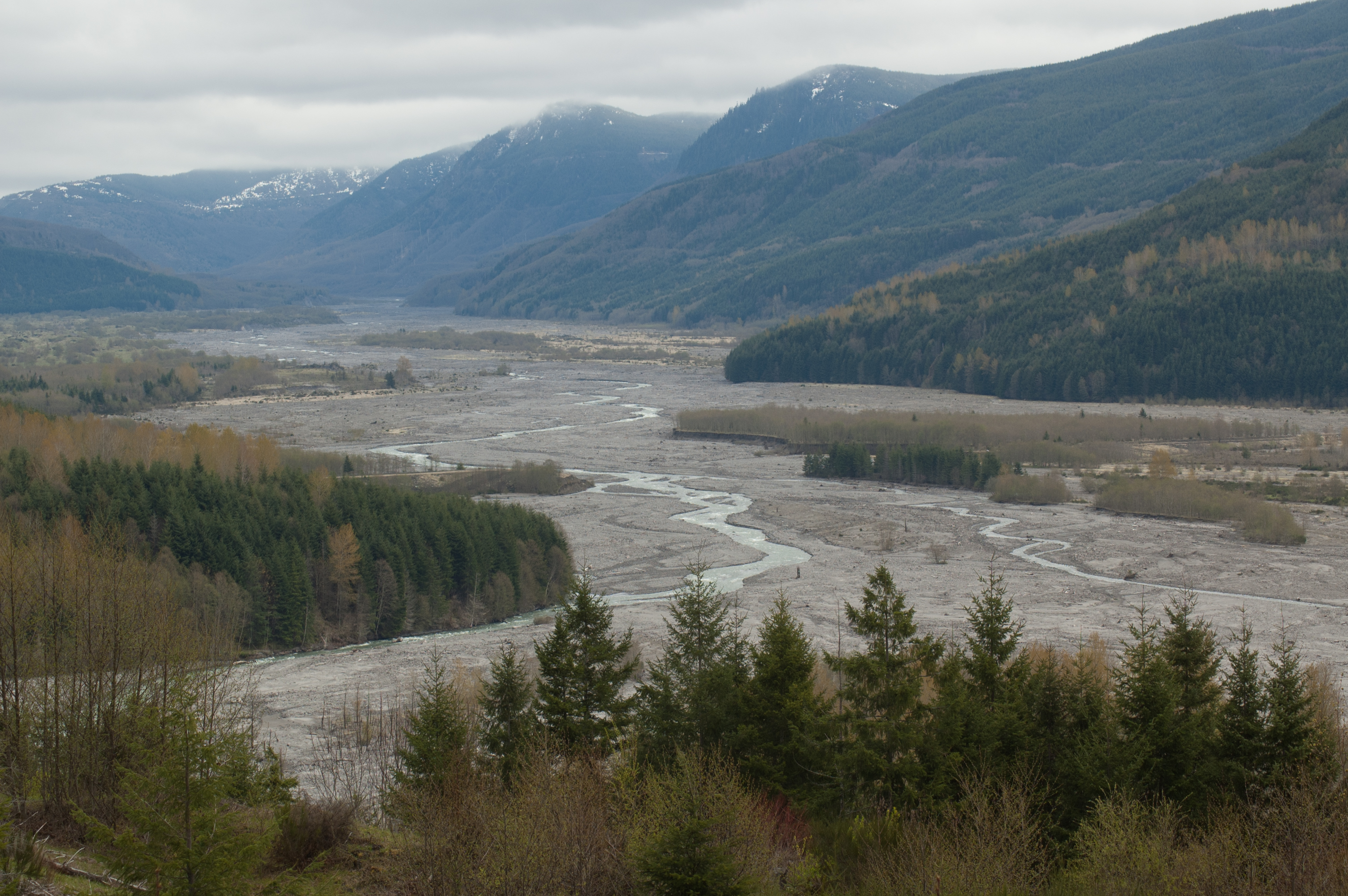
- Ike Kinswa State Park, April 2013

- Location within Washington (state) Location within the United States
- Location: Lewis County, Washington, United States
- Coordinates: 46°33′18″N 122°32′22″W
- Area: 421 acres (170 ha)
- Elevation: 427 ft (130 m)
- Established: 1962
- Administrator: Washington State Parks and Recreation Commission
- Visitors: 147,981 (in 2024)
- Website: Official website

Ike Kinswa State Park is a public recreation area on the northern side of Lake Mayfield, located three miles (4.8 km) northwest of Mossyrock in Lewis County, Washington. The state park covers 421 acres (170 ha) that include 46,000 feet (14,000 m) of shoreline mostly along the Tilton River including the point where the Tilton and Cowlitz rivers once merged. The park offers boating, fishing, swimming, waterskiing and windsurfing plus facilities for camping, hiking, and mountain biking, It is managed by the Washington State Parks and Recreation Commission.

== History ==
The park came into existence with the construction of the Mayfield Dam in 1963. Its original name was Mayfield Lake State Park which was changed in 1971 to Ike Kinswa State Park. A member of the Cowlitz Indian Tribe, Kinswa was awarded a land patent of 165 acres (67 ha) from President Benjamin Harrison during the early formations of the Harmony, Washington community.
