= Winston, Washington =

Unincorporated community in Washington, United States

- Unincorporated community
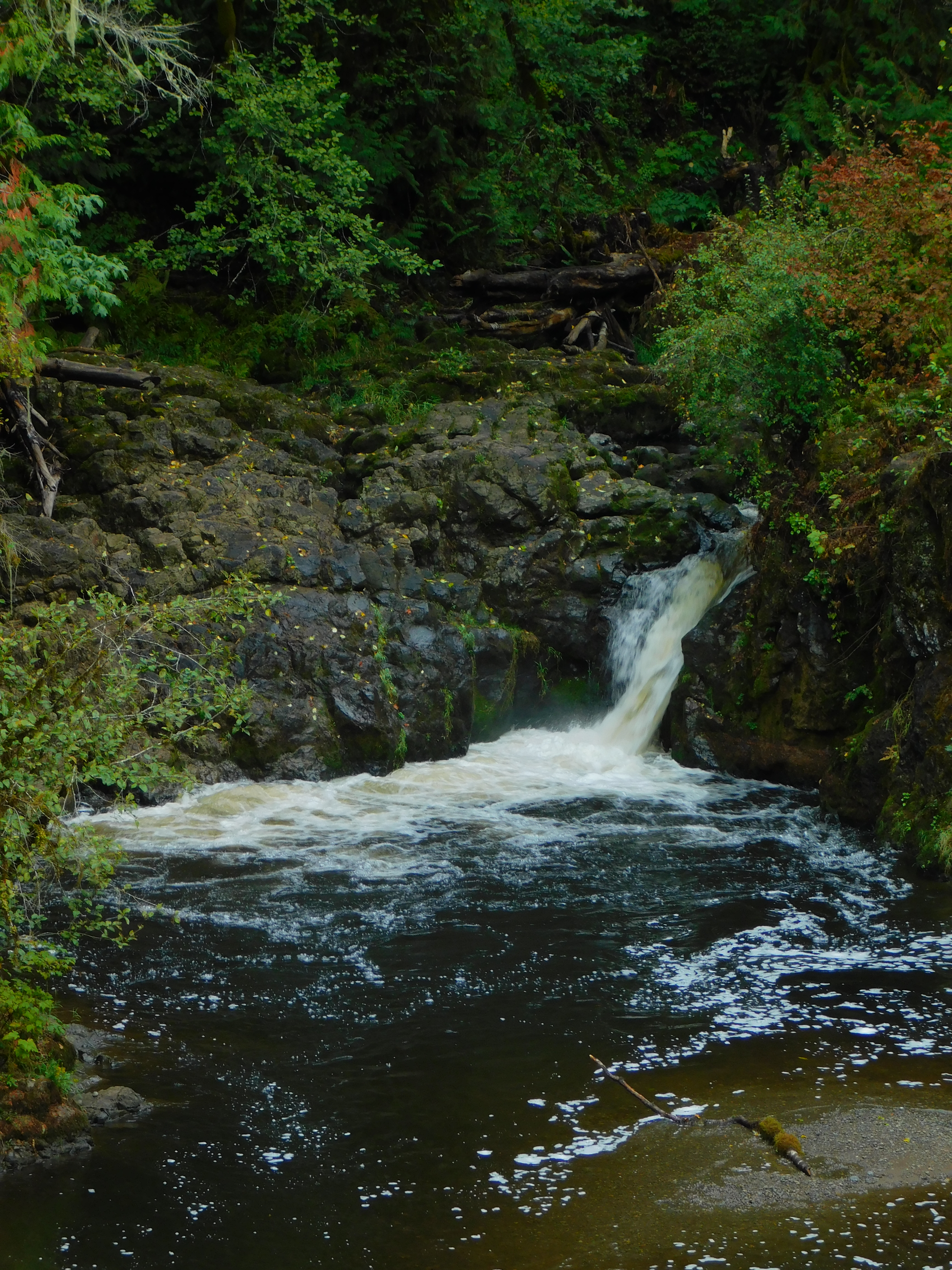
- Winston Creek Falls

- Location within Washington (state) Location within the United States
- Coordinates: 46°29′12″N 122°31′19″W
- Country: United States
- State: Washington
- County: Lewis
- Elevation: 614 ft (187 m)
- Time zone: UTC-8 (Pacific (PST))
  - Summer (DST): UTC-7 (PDT)
- ZIP Code: 98564
- Area code(s): 360, 564
- GNIS feature ID: 1528252

Winston, also known as Winston Creek, is an unincorporated community located in Lewis County, Washington. The rural, residential community sits in the mid-south area of Lewis County and is 3.0 miles (4.8 km) southeast of Mayfield and 4.0 miles (6.4 km) northeast of Wilson.

== History ==
The town took its name from Winston Creek which flows through the area. The creek was named after William Winston, a postmaster at Mayfield. The residents have been served by the Mossyrock post office since the late 1890s.

Mining was an initial endeavor at the site, with a smelting plant erected in 1897. Early attempts to mine for gold would be unproductive. The town's main industry converted to logging with various mills operating in Winston during its prime years. Increased timber activity, and the promise of a growing town, led to the construction of a macadam road from the town to Mayfield in 1927.

An accidental release of four bombs from a military jet exploded over the area in 1952, though there were no casualties or fires.

== Parks and recreation ==
The wilderness around Winston is known for birdwatching and elk and deer hunting. The Winston Creek Campground and Winston Creek Falls are nearby recreational spots.
