= The Last Roundup (album) =

Live album by Poco
- Released: 9 November 2004
- Recorded: July 1977
- Genre: Country rock
- Length: 62:48
- Label: Future Edge
- Producer: Poco, Mark Henry Harman

Poco chronology
Running Horse (2002)	The Last Roundup (2004)	Keeping the Legend Alive (2004)

The Last Roundup is the 21st album, and third live album, by the country rock band Poco.

Recorded live in July 1977 at the Santa Monica Civic Auditorium during the Indian Summer tour (and "The Dance" done the same month at Red Rocks Amphitheatre, accompanied by an orchestra), it was intended to be the band's 13th album. However, its release was cancelled by ABC Records after Timothy B. Schmit left the band to join The Eagles. Poco had intended this album to counteract the damage done to the band's career by the release of Poco Live by their former label, and Richie Furay made a special guest appearance on the album in an effort to boost the album's appeal. It contains mainly music from the post-Furay era. This was Furay's first appearance with the group since his departure after Crazy Eyes.

== Track listing ==
1. "Living in the Band" (Paul Cotton) – 3:15
2. "Dallas" (Donald Fagen, Walter Becker) – 3:34
3. "Magnolia" (J.J. Cale) – 6:45
4. "Honky Tonk Downstairs" (Dallas Frazier) – 2:44
5. "P.N.S. (When You Come Around)" (Paul Cotton) – 3:16
6. "Sagebrush Serenade" (Rusty Young) – 3:12
7. "Indian Summer" (Paul Cotton) – 4:22
8. "Too Many Nights Too Long" (Paul Cotton) – 5:20
9. "Starin' at the Sky" (Timothy B. Schmit, John "Juke" Logan) – 2:55
10. "Twenty Years" (Paul Cotton) – 4:54
11. "The Dance: When the Dance is Over/Go On and Dance/Never Gonna Stop/When the Dance is Over (Reprise)" (Rusty Young) – 9:59
12. "Keep on Tryin’" (Timothy B. Schmit) – 2:43
13. "Hoe Down / Slow Poke" (Richie Furay & Rusty Young / Rusty Young) – 4:15
14. "Rose of Cimarron" (Rusty Young) – 5:34

== Personnel ==
- Paul Cotton — lead and rhythm guitars, lead vocals
- Rusty Young — rhythm guitar, harmony vocals, mandolin, slide guitar, Dobro, steel guitar, banjo
- Timothy B. Schmit — bass, lead and backing vocals
- George Grantham — drums, harmony vocals, percussion
- Richie Furay – vocals on “Magnolia,” vocals and guitar on "Hoe Down / Slow Poke"

== Production ==
- Producer: Poco, Mark Henry Harman; The album was engineered for release by Mark Omann at Universal Mastering and supervised by John Thaler for Futuredge Music.
