= Wilson, Washington =

Unincorporated community in Washington, United States

- Unincorporated community
- Location within Washington (state) Location within the United States
- Coordinates: 46°27′11″N 122°33′17″W
- Country: United States
- State: Washington
- County: Lewis
- Elevation: 920 ft (280 m)
- Time zone: UTC-8 (Pacific (PST))
  - Summer (DST): UTC-7 (PDT)
- ZIP Code: 98564
- Area code(s): 360, 564
- GNIS feature ID: 1528199

Wilson, also known as Wilson Village, is an unincorporated community located in Lewis County, Washington. The former town is in a rural area in the mid-south region of the county, south of Winston and 7.0 miles (11.3 km) south of Mayfield. Communities and towns around Riffe Lake are 12.0 miles (19.3 km) to the northeast of the area. Wilson is mostly residential in nature.

== History ==
The community, also known as Salmon Creek, once had a post office that began in 1891 and closed in 1924. Mail delivery, once supplied by a route from Knab and Toledo, was changed via Mayfield in 1914.

The local economy was based on farming and logging, with a focus on shingle production in part due to its proximity to Salmon Creek, which was used to float the shingles to the Cowlitz River near Toledo. The town was once connected to Toledo by the use of a plank road.

The community had a school and was part of district no. 68. Enrollment was small, with 1903 reports listing between 9 and 14 students.

== Government and politics ==
Presidential Elections Results
Year	Republican	Democratic	Third parties
2008	55.7% 480	41.8% 360	2.6% 22
2012	61.4% 508	36.1% 299	2.5% 21
2016	65.0% 553	27.8% 237	7.2% 61
2020	68.7% 864	28.0% 352	3.3% 41
2024	70.3% 504	27.1% 194	2.6% 19

As Wilson is an unincorporated community, there are no defined bounds, and the precinct may be incongruous with the census boundaries. The voting table includes votes cast in the Salmon Creek voting precinct.

The 2020 election included 28 votes for Jo Jorgensen of the Libertarian Party and six for write-in candidates. In the 2024 election, there were 2 votes cast for write-in candidates and 13 votes were tallied for Robert F. Kennedy Jr..
