= Seaquest State Park =

State park in the U.S. state of Washington

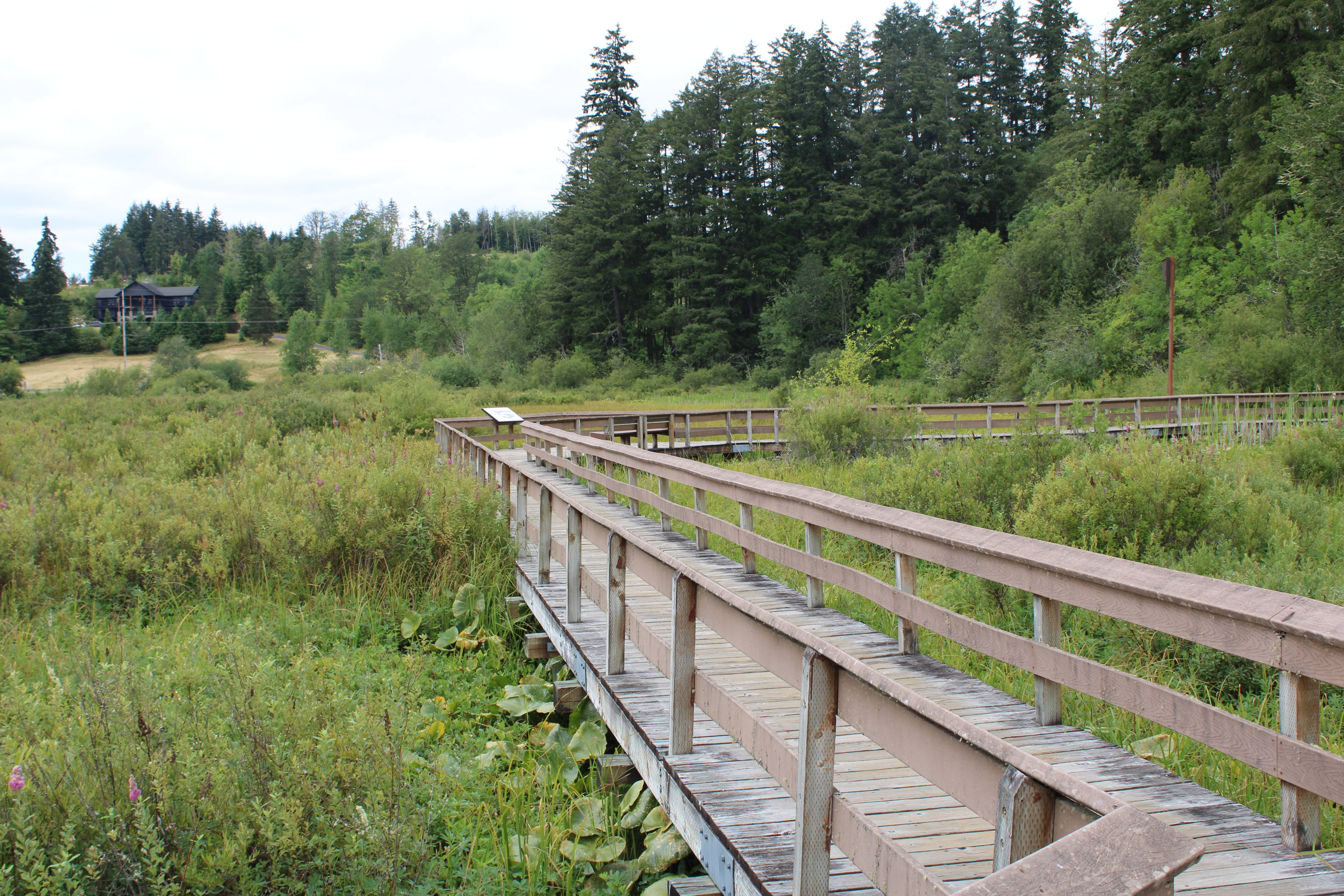
- Silver Lake Wetland Haven Trail, Seaquest State Park

- Location within Washington (state) Location within the United States
- Location: Cowlitz County, Washington, United States
- Coordinates: 46°17′54″N 122°49′05″W
- Area: 505 acres (204 ha)
- Elevation: 600 ft (180 m)
- Established: 1945
- Administrator: Washington State Parks and Recreation Commission
- Visitors: 175,919 (in 2022)
- Named for: Seaquest family
- Website: Official website

Seaquest State Park is a public recreation area and state park located on the western flank of Silver Lake in Cowlitz County, Washington. The park is also home to the Mount St. Helens Visitor Center at Silver Lake.

== History ==
Seaquest State Park was named after the Seaquest family, Swedish settlers led by Charles John Seaquest who began a homestead on the land in 1870. The family donated the site for the purpose of a park to Washington state in 1945. (Note: Sourcing varies on the member of the Seaquest family who officially donated the land. Either Alfred or Charles Seaquest, who were brothers, are listed individually. The Washington State Parks Department specifically mentions Alfred, who is listed as the last surviving member of the family. The year the parcel was donated also varies, with some sourcing mentioning 1948. See sources throughout the article for the discrepancy.) The donation, per the will of Alfred L. Seaquest, came with a perpetual caveat that no liquor could be sold on the property. If the state violates the clause, ownership of the original parcel would transfer to Willamette University.

A "special allotment" of $20,000 (equivalent to $242,481 in 2025) from the state was authorized in 1952 to begin work at the park. The park opened in April 1954 with such amenities as coin-operated gas stoves, sheltered picnic areas, and a partially completed trail system. The homestead, originally 160 acres (65 ha), was nearly tripled in size in the years following the transfer.

The Mount St. Helens Visitor Center at Silver Lake, budgeted to cost $5.3 million, equivalent to $15,566,940 in 2025, was opened during a dedication ceremony on December 13, 1986; the center was originally managed by the United States Forest Service (USFS). (Note: During the 1986 dedication ceremony, it was reported that cloud cover prevented visitors from viewing Mt. St. Helens from Mount St. Helens Visitor Center at Silver Lake. Within a decade or more, sources begin mentioning that the center to have vaguely opened in 1987. See references, particularly after 2000, for the discrepancy.) The center was almost closed in 1999 due to budget cuts of the USFS but the Washington State Parks department offered to oversee and fund the facility so as to remain open for the 20th anniversary of the eruption in 2000. That year, the USFS, due to continuing budgetary cuts at the agency as well as operating costs of the center, transferred operations under a permit to the Washington State Parks system. The permit was extended in 2003 to October 2004.

The center was fully transferred to the state in May 2007; an official transfer ceremony was held the following month. Approximately 300,000 visitors were recorded that year.

The 16,000 square feet (1,500 m^{2}) space underwent its first upgrade in 2024, which included artworks, displays, and exhibits expanding on the history and connection of the Cowlitz Indian Tribe to the mountain and surrounding lands. The center also contains exhibits on the 1980 eruption of Mount St. Helens.

== Geography ==
The 505-acre (204 ha) state park is home to the Mount St. Helens Visitor Center. Seaquest State Park is approximately 50 miles (80 km) west of Mount St. Helens and is located off Spirit Lake Memorial Highway near Castle Rock, Washington. (Note: The distance between the park and Mt. St. Helens varies per source. Most reporting mention an approximate distance of 50 miles (80 km), and sometimes specifically between 47 miles (76 km) and 48 miles (77 km). Other measurements are noted to be as low as 30 miles (48 km). See sources throughout the article for the discrepancy.) The park and center are connected by a pedestrian tunnel under the highway.

The park and visitor center are located next to Silver Lake, a shallow, 3,000-acre (1,200 ha) lowland lake formed when Silver Creek was dammed during an eruption of Mt. St. Helens approximately 2,500 years ago. Landslides from the event, as tall as 120 feet (36.6 m), blocked several streams that led to the overflow of existing lakes and ponds. As the effects spread, Outlet Creek was blocked, creating Silver Lake. The maximum depth of the lake is 15 feet (4.6 m) and is considered the largest naturally-formed body of water within a radius of 100-mile (160 km).

== Environment and ecology ==
The park contains a second-growth, evergreen forest with an understory of several species of fern. Trees in Seaquest include alder, aspen, Douglas fir, and hemlock. Willow and yew, along with thickets of spirea, are located on the trail near Silver Lake. The marsh ponds contain yellow pond lily. Approximately 70 species of plants are located in or around Silver Lake.

Seaquest was once a logging site that was replanted with Douglas fir in the 1970s. By the 2010s, the strand of trees became overcrowded and was considered unhealthy for animal, bird, and vegetation diversity. Three parcels covering 60.5 acres (24.5 ha) were thinned in 2015 to help promote a more extensive habitat and accelerate the timeline for an old-growth forest setting.

Along with deer, the park is home to several types of birds, including coots, herons, hummingbirds, owls and red-winged blackbirds, along with other migratory species. Approximately 500,000 birds, either residing or via migration, are counted at the park annually.

== Activities and amenities ==
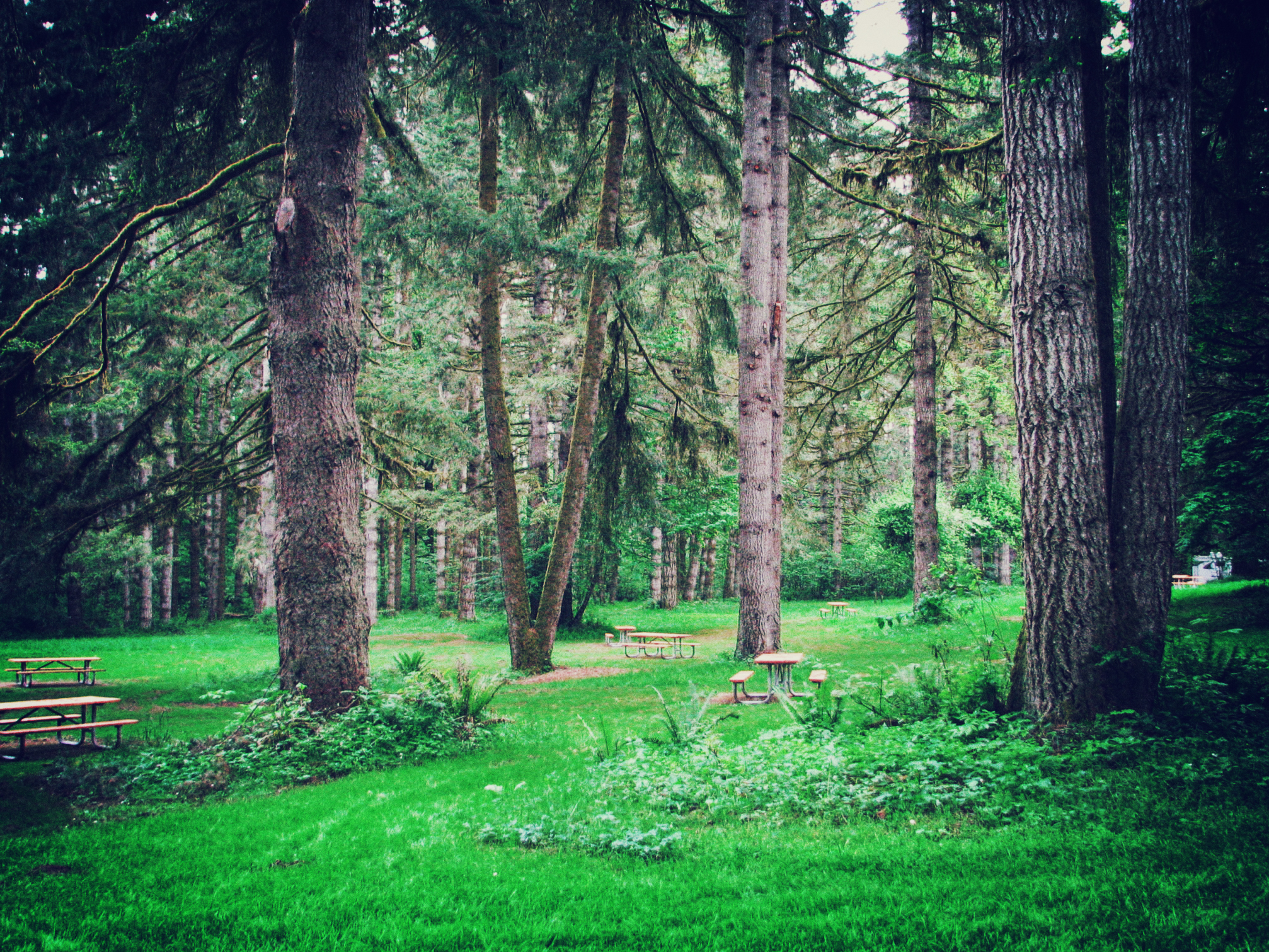
Picnic area, 2008

Park activities include camping and seven miles (11 km) of hiking trails, including a one mile (1.6 km) of ADA-accessible trail. A main loop trail, spanning 3 miles (4.8 km), courses through the forested sections of the site. The trails are a mix of gravel or boardwalks and Mt. St. Helens is visible from several viewpoints. The park has a one mile (1.6 km) shoreline on Silver Lake, which includes a 0.7-mile (1.1 km) wetlands path and boardwalk known as the Silver Lake Wetland Haven Trail. A section of the trail near the western edge of the lake was once a railroad bed used to transport logs during the timber industry years of the area in the early 20th century. A memorial plaque, located approximately halfway through the trail, is dedicated to the 57 people who died during the 1980 eruption.

The park contains areas for horseshoes and picnicking, as well as a playground. A public boat launch on Silver Lake is located 3 miles (4.8 km) east of the center. Bird watching, kayaking, and fishing are common activities for visitors. The lake contains bass, blue gill, carp, and perch, and is stocked with trout.

As of 2026, Seaquest Park offers yurt camping during the winter season, when snowshoeing becomes a common recreational activity at the site.
