= Silver Lake, Washington =

Unincorporated community in Washington, United States

- Unincorporated community
- Location in the state of Washington Silver Lake (the United States)
- Coordinates: 46°17′50″N 122°48′38″W
- Country: United States
- State: Washington
- County: Cowlitz
- Elevation: 515 ft (157 m)
- Time zone: UTC−8 (PST)
  - Summer (DST): UTC−7 (PDT)
- ZIP Code: 98645
- Area code(s): 360, 564
- FIPS code: 53-64400
- GNIS feature ID: 1508354

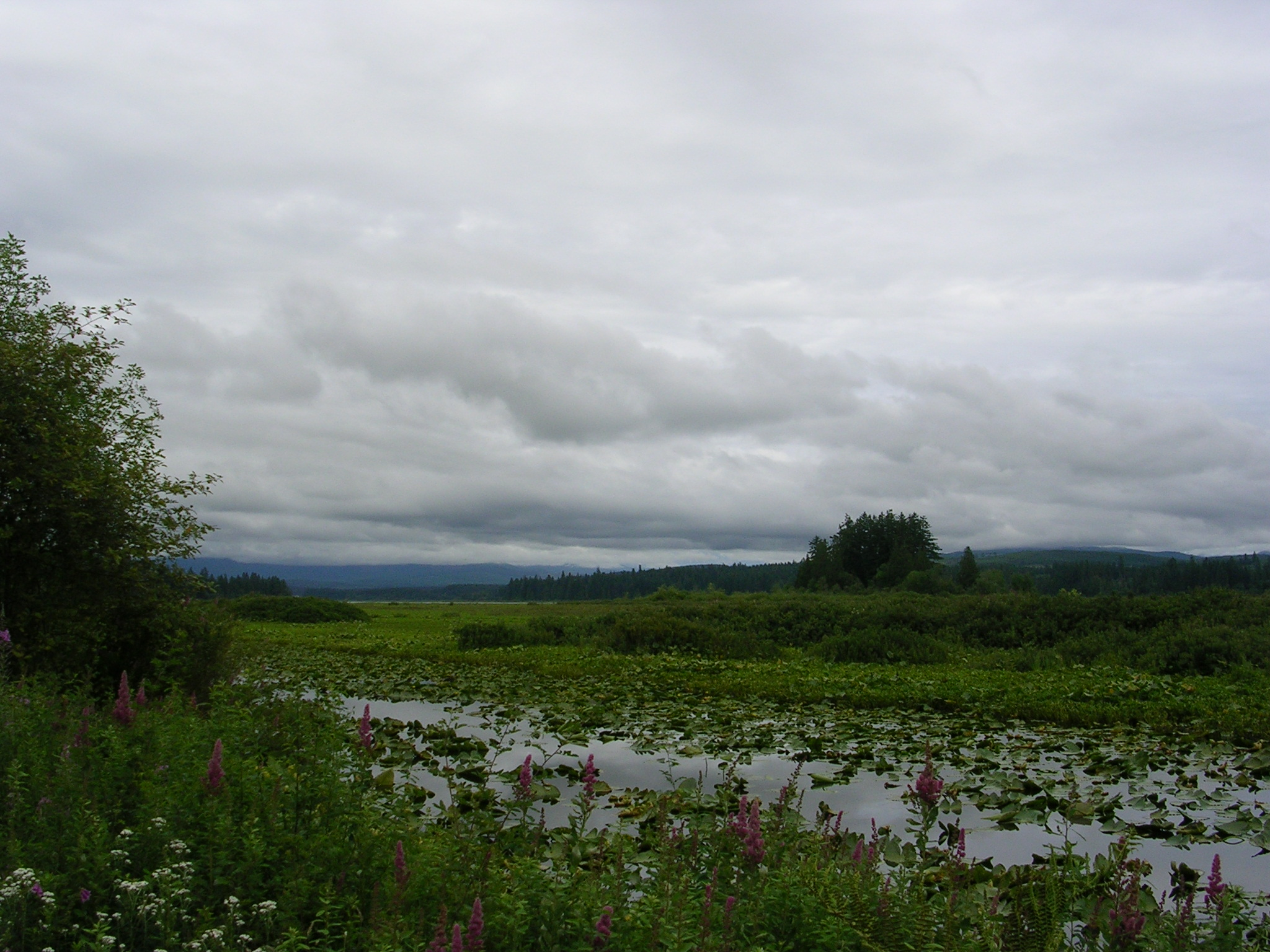
View of Silverlake marsh from the nature trail at the visitor center, 2007.

Silver Lake, sometimes Silverlake, is an unincorporated community in Cowlitz County, Washington, in the southwestern portion of the state. Silver Lake is located 6 miles (9.7 km) east of Castle Rock along Washington State Route 504, which is also known as the Spirit Lake Memorial Highway. The area considered Silverlake is about 6 miles (10 km) east of Interstate 5 (I-5) and is approximately 50 miles (80 km) from Portland, Oregon, to the south and Seattle about 110 miles (180 km) to the north. The closest cities to the subject property are Castle Rock, six miles (10 km) to the west, and Toutle, four miles (6 km) east.

The Silver Lake community takes its name from the lake of the same name, which it lies on the northwest shore of. The Silver Lake community is part of the Toutle Lake School District, a K-12 school district of about 600 students. Silver Lake is about 30 miles (48 km) west of Mount St. Helens and near the Mount St. Helens National Volcanic Monument, which lies at the end of the Spirit Lake Memorial Highway. The eruption of Mount St. Helens on May 18, 1980 was the deadliest and most economically destructive volcanic event in the history of the United States. The WDFW has planted grass carp in this lake. The grass carp have lived far longer than expected, and have destroyed much of the beneficial native vegetation. It is now legal to fish for or retain grass carp.

Silverlake also describes the associated marsh. It is home to a nature trail, and the visitor center for the Mount St. Helens National Volcanic Monument.

== Economy ==
Employment in the area is primarily centered on the cities of Longview, Kelso, and Castle Rock, which are all situated along the Interstate-5 freeway. The regional economy rests mainly on timber and tourism, but the latter has taken precedence since the decline of the timber industry. Local economic growth has remained stable due to outdoor activities that take place in the scenic Silverlake area, including camping, hunting, and fishing.

== Transport ==
Silverlake is served by one major road, Spirit Lake Memorial Highway, which joins I-5 in Castle Rock to the west and runs east to the US Forest Services' Mount Saint Helens Observatory at Johnston Ridge. This highway is a two-directional arterial heading west and east with both residential and commercial development areas running alongside it. Major shopping, dining and commercial properties are located up and down the I-5 corridor.

== Services ==
Silverlake is not an incorporated town, but relies primarily on Castle Rock and the town of Toutle for schools and services. Cowlitz County provides most services including police, fire, ambulance, water, sewer, and garbage. Gas service is provided by Cascade Natural Gas while CenturyLink and Frontier Communications provide telephone service. The area is composed of a mixture of uses that range from single-family and multi-family residential, commercial, retail, and agricultural uses. Traffic volume along Silver Lake remains consistent with approximately 1,000 cars passing it per day.

== Lake ==
The lake itself is 3,000 acres (12 km^{2}) in size and camping is available at Seaquest State Park, which occupies 475 acres (192 ha) along 1 mile (1.6 km) of the lakeshore. Camping, fishing, and boating also available at Silverlake Resort, Silver Cove RV Resort, Streeters Resort, and Mt. St. Helens RV Resort.
