= Harmony, Washington =

Community in Lewis County, Washington

- Unincorporated community
- Location within Washington (state) Location within the United States
- Coordinates: 46°33′29″N 122°29′1″W
- Country: United States
- State: Washington
- County: Lewis
- Established: February 14, 1890
- Elevation: 719 ft (219 m)
- Time zone: UTC-8 (Pacific (PST))
  - Summer (DST): UTC-7 (PDT)
- Area code(s): 360, 564
- GNIS feature ID: 1520553

Harmony is an unincorporated town in Lewis County, Washington. The community is located near the junction of the Cowlitz River and Mayfield Lake, and is situated off Route 122, north of Mossyrock.

== History ==
The region was populated by the Cowlitz people who would traverse over the Cowlitz River by means of a local phenomenon, known as the Drift, which created a log jam bridge. A tribal member, Ike Kinswa, was awarded a land patent of 165 acres (67 ha) from President Benjamin Harrison during the early formations of the Harmony community.

The town was named after the "harmonious relationship" between community members in the area, who began settling the land in the late 1800s. The first non-Native settler may have been Ike Skinner, a trapper, but any official recording of Harmony's early pioneer settlement date, outside of the creation of a post office in 1890, is unknown. The post office operated from February 14, 1890, to February 15, 1924.

The earliest plans for the community began in 1895 when new residents were charged a "joining fee" of $500, which provided a house and land, and members were paid a dividend, as well as profit sharing of the local harvest. Articles of incorporation were filed stating that Harmony was meant to be a refined, well-mannered, and ideal community based on "unselfish principles of co-operation and brotherly love". The community advertised itself as welcoming to those who were Caucasian, of good moral character, and accepted socialism. Despite interest that spread nationally, only one person beyond Lewis County joined. The membership attempt for a utopian community lasted until 1899.

The community constructed a two-room schoolhouse in 1901, often used as a space for communal gatherings. The town was part of school district No. 51 but was consolidated into No. 206 by 1912. By 1913, the school was deemed too small and ill-suited for its location, and a larger, but one-room, school was built beginning in May. The older building was put up for auction in October 1913.

The area was known for old-growth forests. Early farming including the growing of hops but a planned fruit ranch failed to materialize. The town's original farming background continues and the community has experienced residential growth since the construction of the dams on the Cowlitz River. Due to the changes in water flow, the Drift events ceased.

== Arts and culture ==
=== Events and festivals ===
The community began a Harmony Wine and Jazz Festival in the late 2000s, growing popular enough to be part of an expanded music festival in the Mayfield Lake area.

=== Historic buildings and sites ===
The town has a Catholic community along with a church, the St. Yves (Ives) Catholic Church, which was initially built along the Cowlitz River on a bluff overlooking Dunn Canyon in 1914. Dedicated on July 12, 1914, the church was named after the patron saint of attorneys, Ivo of Kermartin. The church was situated on 1.0-acre (0.40 ha) of donated land and contained poplar trees that were most likely planted during or near construction; a cemetery was placed behind the church. The house of worship was mostly unchanged since its beginnings, though an addition in 1952 almost doubled the size of the building. The church was white with light blue-trim, and was built with a steeple and bell, and its inscription was "Chapel of Saint Ives - Our Lady of the Valley".

The church was destroyed during a fire in 1989 but a similar place of worship, retaining the original name, was rebuilt on the grounds.

== Parks and recreation ==
The town is an access point to Ike Kinswa State Park, where many of its early settlers have been buried. Harmony also is home to a resort and campground, and is known locally for the Harmony Bridge, first built in the early 1900s and is a fishing spot over the Cowlitz River.

== Politics ==
Presidential Elections Results
Year	Republican	Democratic	Third parties
2008	61.5% 330	35.6% 191	3.0% 16
2012	60.3% 308	36.0% 184	3.7% 19
2016	68.2% 345	28.5% 144	3.4% 17
2020	68.1% 467	29.7% 204	1.9% 13
2024	68.9% 490	27.4% 195	3.6% 26

The 2020 election included 13 votes for Jo Jorgensen of the Libertarian Party and there were 2 votes for write-in candidates. In the 2024 election, there were 4 votes cast for write-in candidates and 11 votes were tallied for Robert F. Kennedy Jr..
