= Heart of the Night (song) =

Single by Poco

from the album Legend
- B-side: "The Last Goodbye"
- Released: May 1979
- Recorded: 1978
- Genre: Soft rock, country rock
- Length: 4:49 (album); 3:20 (single)
- Label: MCA
- Songwriter: Paul Cotton
- Producer: Richard Sanford Orshoff

Poco singles chronology
"Crazy Love" (1979)	"Heart of the Night" (1979)	"Legend" (1979)

"Heart of the Night" is a song on the 1978 album release by the country-rock group Poco entitled Legend; the 1979 hit single is also featured on the group retrospective 20th Century Masters, as well as The Essential Poco.

== Background ==
The song's lead vocalist and composer Paul Cotton would describe "Heart of the Night" as a song which (Paul Cotton quote:) "kind of wrote itself...in twenty minutes", being "inspired by my love and lust for New Orleans", a city Cotton had previously focused on "Down in the Quarter" (from Head Over Heels); Cotton has also stated that he wrote "Break of Hearts" (from Ghost Town) as a followup to "Heart of the Night" (although "Break of Hearts" contains no regional references). Cotton, born in Alabama but raised in Chicago, would aver: (Paul Cotton quote:): "I'm just drawn to the South. Hey, I spent 25 winters in Chicago."

from Our Favorite Country Songs About Every Southern State in Southern Living 21 July 2017
This song is such a heartfelt tribute to the city of New Orleans, the eros of the great state of Louisiana. Its reference to the Dixie moon over the Pontchartrain, the Southern rain and the ebb and flow of the river rising shines a light on the natural beauty that exists alongside the many cultural and celebratory things the city is known for. Anna Wilson of Troubadour 77

"Heart of the Night" is highlighted by an alto sax solo by Phil Kenzie who had similarly and memorably contributed to the Al Stewart 1976-77 hit "Year of the Cat": Kenzie had become acquainted with Cotton and Young as a result of Kenzie's playing behind Al Stewart during the 1977 Year of the Cat tour which featured Poco as opening act. Two other members of Al Stewart's tour band, drummer Steve Chapman and bassist Charlie Harrison, also played on the sessions for the Legend album. (Paul Cotton:) "Steve Chapman, right after we rehearsed ['Heart of the Night'] in the studio, said 'Man, that’s going to be a big hit.'"

In 1978, with Poco seemingly disbanded, Cotton and Rusty Young (Young quote:) "got a little rehearsal hall, put together a band, and played [several songs including] 'Crazy Love' and 'Heart of the Night'" for ABC Records executives who okayed Cotton and Young recording an album as the Cotton-Young Band; however by the time the album - recorded at Crystal City Studios (Los Angeles) between April and August 1978 - had been completed ABC had decided to issue it as a new Poco album, a decision which effectively promoted Steve Chapman and Charlie Harrison from being one-off session players to tenured members of Poco.

== Reception ==
Cash Box said that it has "the same easy, country-pop feeling" as "Crazy Love" and that the pedal steel guitar playing and "lightly twanging vocals" add "distinctive Poco character." Record World said that it "builds in emotion and intensity featuring sensitive vocals, soaring steel and standout rhythm section."

== Chart performance ==
The album Legend was released in November 1978 with the lead single "Crazy Love" released in January 1979 to become Poco's first Top 40 hit. "Heart of the Night" was issued as the second single from Legend in May 1979, reaching a Hot 100 peak of #20. Billboard ranked "Heart of the Night" as a #5 Easy Listening hit. The track also appeared on the C&W chart at #96. In Canada "Heart of the Night" peaked at #18.

== Other performances ==
A live performance by Poco of "Heart of the Night" appears on the November 1979 multi-artist album No Nukes: The Muse Concerts for a Non-Nuclear Future which contains selections from the September 1979 Madison Square Garden concerts by Musicians United for Safe Energy. A live rendition of "Heart of the Night" - featuring sax player Phil Kenzie from the original recording - is also featured on the 2004 Poco concert album Keeping the Legend Alive recorded May 20, 2004 at the Belcourt Theatre in Nashville.
