= Dunn Brothers (bounty hunters) =

American group in the 1880s and 1890s

The Dunn Brothers were a group of brothers from Pawnee, Oklahoma, who worked as Old West bounty hunters. They are best known for having killed George "Bittercreek" Newcomb and Charley Pierce, members of the Wild Bunch.

The brothers - Bee, Calvin, Dal, George and Bill Dunn - ran a boarding house near Ingalls and a meat market in Pawnee. Bill Dunn was the leader, and the oldest of the brothers. By the 1880s, the Dunn brothers were working as bounty hunters, although they had been involved in cattle rustling and robbery. Their teenaged sister Rose became romantically involved with "Bittercreek" Newcomb, having met him through her brothers. On May 2, 1895, when Newcomb and Charley Pierce rode up to the Dunn house to visit with Rose, the brothers shot and killed both outlaws as they dismounted. They then collected the bounty on both, believed to have been $5,000 each, mostly due to the notoriety of the gang by that time.

It is believed that on August 25, 1896, Bill Dunn led Deputy US Marshal Heck Thomas to the hideout of Bill Doolin. Some have speculated that Dunn murdered Doolin; however, official reports from the time discount this, indicating that Thomas actually killed him. By late that year, people around Pawnee had started complaining that the Dunn brothers were involved in rustling and robbery. Sheriff Frank Canton - a gunman with a substantial reputation who had previously arrested Bill Dunn for rustling - began investigating the claims.

On November 6, 1896, Bill Dunn rode into Pawnee intent on killing Sheriff Canton. As Canton walked out of a restaurant after having dinner, Bill Dunn appeared in front of him and tried to draw his revolver, but Canton drew quicker and fired two shots, killing Dunn. The shooting was ruled self defense. Bill Dunn's death effectively ended the bounty hunting for the Dunn brothers, as their already-questionable reputations suffered greatly.
