= Silver Creek, Washington =

Unincorporated community in Washington, United States

- Unincorporated community
- Location within Washington (state) Location within the United States
- Coordinates: 46°31′31″N 122°35′25″W
- Country: United States
- State: Washington
- County: Lewis
- Elevation: 679 ft (207 m)
- Time zone: UTC-8 (Pacific (PST))
  - Summer (DST): UTC-7 (PDT)
- ZIP Code: 98582, 98585
- Area code(s): 360, 564
- GNIS feature ID: 1525751

Silver Creek is an unincorporated community in Lewis County, Washington, United States. Silver Creek is located along U.S. Route 12 near its junction with Washington State Route 122, 5 miles (8.0 km) west of Mossyrock. Lake Mayfield is accessible 3.5 miles to the east.

== Etymology ==
The town takes its name from a nearby creek of the same name. One of two brooks labeled Silver Creek in Lewis County, the silver moniker was believed to be taken from the colorful effects of the waters near the community. A second theory posits that reflections off the creek bed signified the possibility of silver in the waterway.

== History ==
One of the earliest non-indigenous settlers in the area was the John Tucker family, creating a homestead in 1868. The first post office was established in the Tucker home and a family member oversaw postal duties in the community for nearly five decades. The post office, given the name Silver Creek, has been in operation since 1875.

== Government and politics ==
Presidential Elections Results Silver Creek Precinct
Year	Republican	Democratic	Third parties
2008	56.5% 297	40.1% 211	3.4% 18
2012	63.7% 328	33.4% 172	2.9% 15
2016	68.4% 359	24.2% 127	7.4% 39
2020	69.0% 498	29.1% 210	1.8% 13
2024	69.0% 506	28.9% 212	2.0% 15

=== Politics ===
As Silver Creek is an unincorporated community, there are no defined bounds, and the precinct may be incongruous with the census boundaries. Salkum Precinct may include voters in Silver Creek.

The 2020 election included 10 votes for candidates of the Libertarian Party and 3 votes for write-in candidates. In the 2024 election, there were two votes cast for write-in candidates and 9 votes were tallied for Robert F. Kennedy Jr..
