= Eli Kulp =

American chef

Eli Kulp is an American chef. Kulp is the chef of Fork restaurant in Philadelphia.

== Background and education ==
Kulp grew up in Mossyrock, Washington, a town he describes as having 498 residents and no restaurants.

Kulp is a 2005 graduate of the Culinary Institute of America.

== Career ==
In 2012, Kulp left New York's Torrisi Italian Specialities to join chef Ellen Yin's Fork restaurant in Philadelphia.

In 2014, Kulp was named "Best New Chef" by Food & Wine magazine.

Kulp was badly injured in the 2015 Philadelphia train derailment. Philadelphians have sponsored campaigns to ease the financial burden of Kulp's recovery.

He has continued to manage High Street on Market from a wheelchair.
