= Live (Poco album) =

Poco Live

Live album by Poco
- Released: April 3, 1976
- Recorded: November 1974
- Genre: Country rock
- Length: 38:21
- Label: Epic
- Producer: Poco, Mark Henry Harman

Poco chronology
The Very Best of Poco (1975)	Poco Live (1976)	Rose of Cimarron (1976)

Professional ratings
Review scores
Source	Rating
Allmusic	link
Encyclopedia of Popular Music	2/5 stars

Poco Live is the tenth album, and second live album, by the American country rock band Poco. The material for this album had been recorded for Epic Records shortly after the Cantamos album, but it was not released until over a year later, after Poco's switch to ABC Records and success with the Head over Heels album. The release of this album (April 1976, Epic) produced confusion in the marketplace over whether this or Rose of Cimarron (May 1976, ABC Records) was Poco's newest album, helping sales of Poco Live and hurting sales of Rose of Cimarron.

== Track listing ==
1. "Medley: Blue Water / Fools Gold / Rocky Mountain Breakdown" (Paul Cotton, Rusty Young) – 6:36
2. "Bad Weather" (Paul Cotton) – 3:50
3. "Ride the Country" (Paul Cotton) – 7:41
4. "Angel" (Paul Cotton) – 5:14
5. "High and Dry" (Rusty Young) – 4:35
6. "Restrain" (Timothy B. Schmit) – 5:13
7. "A Good Feelin' to Know" (Richie Furay) – 5:12

== Personnel ==
=== Poco ===
- Paul Cotton – guitar, vocals
- Rusty Young – steel guitar, banjo, guitar, vocals
- Timothy B. Schmit – bass guitar, guitar, vocals
- George Grantham – drums, vocals

=== Others ===
- Mark Henry Harman – keyboards
- Producer: Poco, Mark Henry Harman
- Recording Engineer: Mark Henry Harman
