= Tilton River =

River in Lewis County, Washington

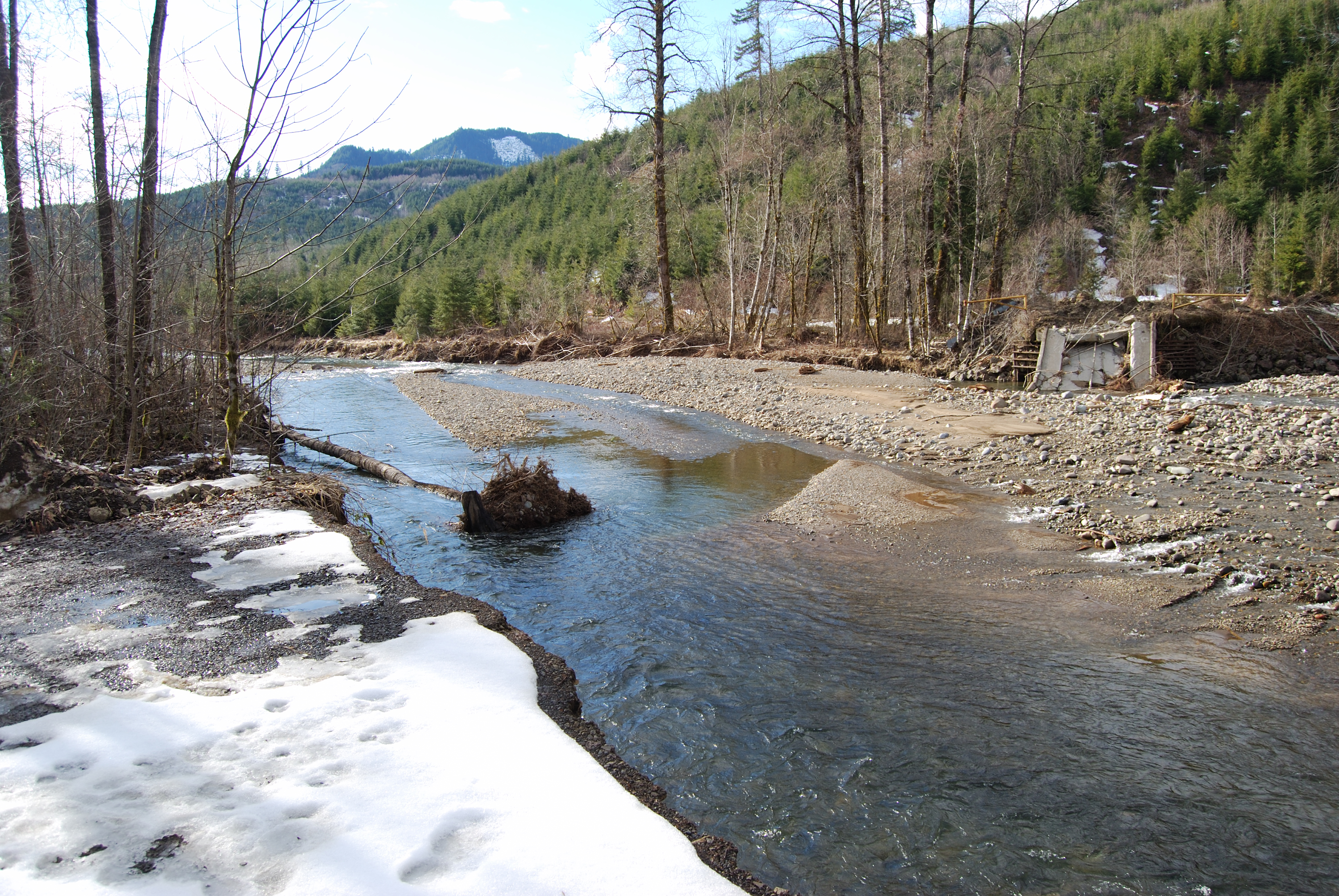

- Location of the mouth of Tilton River in Washington

Location
- Country: United States
- State: Washington
- County: Lewis

Physical characteristics
- Source: Gifford Pinchot National Forest
  - location: north of Morton
  - coordinates: 46°39′23″N 122°13′44″W
  - elevation: 3,035 ft (925 m)
- Mouth: Cowlitz River
  - location: Lake Mayfield
  - coordinates: 46°33′09″N 122°32′04″W
  - elevation: 427 ft (130 m)
- Length: 29 mi (47 km)
- Basin size: 154 sq mi (400 km^{2})
- Discharge
  - location: Cinebar, Washington
  - average: 979.8 cuft/s
  - minimum: 50 cuft/s
  - maximum: 1,200 cuft/s

Basin features
- Geographic Names Information System: 1527224

The Tilton River is a tributary of the Cowlitz River, in the U.S. state of Washington. Named for the first territorial surveyor for Washington Territory James Tilton (surveyor), it flows for about 29 miles (47 km), entirely within Lewis County.

== Course ==
The Tilton River originates in the Cascade Range just north of Mount St. Helens and southwest of Mount Rainier. It flows south and west, joining the Cowlitz River in Lake Mayfield, near Mossyrock.

== See also ==
- List of geographic features in Lewis County, Washington
- List of rivers of Washington (state)
- Tributaries of the Columbia River
