= Mayfield, Washington =

Unincorporated community in Washington, United States

- Unincorporated community
- Location within Washington (state) Location within the United States
- Coordinates: 46°30′31″N 122°34′09″W
- Country: United States
- State: Washington
- County: Lewis
- Established: 1895
- Elevation: 430 ft (130 m)
- Time zone: UTC-8 (Pacific (PST))
  - Summer (DST): UTC-7 (PDT)
- ZIP Code: 98564
- Area code(s): 360, 564
- GNIS feature ID: 1522855

Mayfield is an unincorporated community on the southern shore of Lake Mayfield in Lewis County, Washington. It is located off U.S. Route 12, east of Silver Creek. The Mayfield Dam, which supplies hydroelectricity to Tacoma and its neighboring cities, sits 1-mile (1.6 km) west of the area.

The area hosted an indigenous village before the settlement of Mayfield in the 1890s. A post office existed until 1963. The town was moved in the 1950s during the build of the dam and the original location was permanently flooded under the lake.

== History ==
Before the arrival of non-native settlers, the location was used as a village for Native American people. A post office for the territory was established in 1890 or 1891 and named Ferry in recognition of Washington state's first governor. The community's eponym changed to Mayfield in either 1891 or 1895 and was done so in homage to the location's first postmaster, H.T. (or W.H.) Mayfield.

The first bridge to span the Cowlitz River was built approximately in 1879 in Mayfield. The bridge transported logs and was crossed by horse and buggy. The span washed out during a high water event years later, but replaced at a location of higher elevation.

The original center of the town was vacated and razed, with homes relocated to the surrounding area, beginning in 1955 during the building of the Mayfield Dam. Most residents, despite opposition, accepted buyouts for their property as the monetary offers were considered a "take it or leave it proposition". The post office was moved in 1962, but quickly closed the following year as the dam neared completion; the old town is permanently underwater.

== Geography ==
Mayfield was originally located on the southeast side of a bluff overlooking a canyon of the Cowlitz River. The community in the present-day is situated on the eastern shore of Mayfield Lake, immediately south of U.S. Route 12. The outflow of Winston Creek splits the community. The flooded remnants exist approximately 24 feet (7.3 m) under the lake.
