= Indian Summer (Poco album) =

Studio album by Poco
- Released: May 1, 1977
- Recorded: 1977 at Burbank Studios (Burbank, California)
- Genre: Country rock
- Length: 37:17
- Label: ABC
- Producer: Poco, Mark Henry Harman

Poco chronology
Rose of Cimarron (1976)	Indian Summer (1977)	Legend (1978)

Indian Summer is the tenth studio album by the American country rock band Poco, released on May 1, 1977. The appearance of Steely Dan's Donald Fagen playing synthesizer on two of the tracks marked another move away from the country rock sound the band had primarily been known for. This was the band's last studio album before both Timothy B. Schmit and George Grantham left the group.

== Reception ==
Professional ratings
Review scores
Source	Rating
AllMusic	2/5 stars
The Encyclopedia of Popular Music	4/5 stars
The Rolling Stone Album Guide	2/5 stars

In his AllMusic review, music critic Peter Kurtz wrote that the album was "a few notches down from their best, early material... The strongest song is the title track, which has some nice steel guitar and harmony vocals, but this high point is balanced by the closing number, 'The Dance', a clumsy suite that's burdened by an over-the-top string and horn arrangement... File this under the "treading water" category."

== Track listing ==
1. "Indian Summer" (Paul Cotton) – 4:40
2. "Twenty Years" (Cotton) – 3:42
3. "Me and You" (Timothy B. Schmit) – 2:44
4. "Downfall" (Rusty Young) – 4:33
5. "Win or Lose" (Cotton) – 4:40
6. "Living in the Band" (Cotton) – 3:14
7. "Stay (Night Until Noon)" (Timothy B. Schmit, Noreen Schmit) – 3:22
8. "Find Out in Time" (Timothy B. Schmit, Robbin Thompson) – 3:54
9. "The Dance: When the Dance Is Over / Go on and Dance / Never Gonna Stop / When the Dance Is Over (Reprise)" (Young) – 10:05

== Charts ==
Chart (1977)	Position
Australia (Kent Music Report)	75
United States (Billboard 200)	57

== Track-by-track personnel ==
"Indian Summer"

- Paul Cotton – lead vocals, Gretsch White Falcon
- Timothy B. Schmit – backing vocals, bass
- George Grantham – backing vocals, drums
- Rusty Young – steel and sitar steel guitars
- Steve Forman – percussion, creatures
- Donald Fagen – ARP Odyssey, ARP String Ensemble

"Twenty Years"

- Paul Cotton – lead vocals, lead guitar
- George Grantham – drums
- Timothy B. Schmit – backing vocals, bass
- Rusty Young – steel and lead steel guitars
- Mark Henry Herman – acoustic piano
- Steve Forman – tambourine

"Me and You"

- Timothy B. Schmit – lead vocals, bass
- George Grantham – backing vocals, drums
- Paul Cotton – backing vocals, acoustic and electric guitars
- Rusty Young – steel guitar

"Downfall"

- Rusty Young – lead vocals, Leslie and lead steel guitar, electric guitar
- George Grantham – backing vocals, drums
- Timothy B. Schmit – backing vocals, bass
- Paul Cotton – lead guitar
- Mark Henry Herman – acoustic piano
- Steve Forman – congas, tambourine

"Win or Lose"

- Paul Cotton – lead vocals, Gretsch White Falcon
- George Grantham – backing vocals, drums
- Timothy B. Schmit – backing vocals, bass
- Rusty Young – Leslie and wah-wah steel guitars
- Donald Fagen – ARP String Ensemble

"Living in the Band"

- Paul Cotton – lead vocals, lead guitar
- George Grantham – backing vocals, drums, jawbone, shakers
- Timothy B. Schmit – backing vocals, bass
- Rusty Young – Leslie and lead steel guitars
- Steve Forman – congas

"Stay (Night Until Noon)"

- Timothy B. Schmit – lead vocals, bass
- Paul Cotton – backing vocals, lead guitar
- George Grantham – backing vocals, drums
- Rusty Young – Leslie steel guitar, banjo

"Find Out in Time"

- Timothy B. Schmit – lead vocals, bass, harmonica
- George Grantham – backing vocals, shakers
- Paul Cotton – backing vocals, acoustic and electric guitars
- Rusty Young – Leslie steel guitar, mandolin, banjo
- Steve Forman — surdo

"The Dance"

- Rusty Young –acoustic, slide, electric and Leslie steel guitars
- George Grantham – lead and backing vocals, drums
- Paul Cotton – lead and backing vocals, Gretsch White Falcon
- Timothy B. Schmit – lead and backing vocals, bass, harmonica
- Mark Henry Herman – electric piano, celesta
- Steve Forman – percussion
- Sid Sharp – concertmaster
- Jimmie Haskell – string and horn arrangements

== Production ==
- Poco – producers
- Mark Henry Harman – producer, engineer
- Tim "Zoots" Green – assistant engineer
- Wally Traugott – mastering
- Capitol Studios (Hollywood, California) – mastering location
- Llew Llewellyn – equipment
- Terry Merchant – equipment
- Phil Hartman – cover artwork
- Ron Slenzak – photography
- Dennis Jones – road manager
