= Rose of Cimarron (album) =

Studio album by Poco
- Released: May 1976
- Studio: Record Plant (Los Angeles, California)
- Genre: Country rock
- Length: 35:35
- Label: ABC
- Producer: Poco, Mark Henry Harman

Poco chronology
Live (1976)	Rose of Cimarron (1976)	Indian Summer (1977)

Singles from Rose of Cimarron
- 1. "Rose of Cimarron" Released: October 1976

Rose of Cimarron is the ninth studio album by the American country rock band Poco, released in 1976.

== Background ==
Former Loggins & Messina sax/fiddle player Al Garth joined the band to record this album, but left shortly after due to internal conflicts. On the cover and in photos throughout the album package, the band is depicted as a quartet without Garth (i.e, Paul Cotton, George Grantham, Timothy B. Schmit, and Rusty Young.) Garth is credited with playing on seven of the album's 10 tracks.

The title track became one of the band's signature songs, and was later recorded by Emmylou Harris on her album, Cimarron. The band's old label, Epic Records, released Poco Live just one month before Rose of Cimarron, causing confusion among listeners and helping sales of the former at the expense of the latter.

Paul Cotton contributes a version of his song "P.N.S. (When You Come Around)" originally recorded when he was with Illinois Speed Press.

== Reception ==
Professional ratings
Review scores
Source	Rating
Allmusic	3/5 stars
Encyclopedia of Popular Music	4/5 stars

In his Allmusic review, music critic James Chrispell wrote of the album; "The country influence is nearly abandoned except for the Rusty Young tune "Company's Comin'/Slow Poke." There are great tunes with great arrangements throughout."

== Track listing ==
1. "Rose of Cimarron" (Rusty Young) – 6:42
2. "Stealaway" (Young) – 3:12
3. "Just Like Me" (Timothy B. Schmit) – 2:45
4. "Company’s Comin’" (Young) – 2:39
5. "Slow Poke" (Young) – 2:04
6. "Too Many Nights Too Long" (Paul Cotton) – 5:59
7. "P.N.S. (When You Come Around)" (Cotton) – 3:15
8. "Starin’ at the Sky" (Schmit, John Logan) – 2:58
9. "All Alone Together" (Cotton) – 3:21
10. "Tulsa Turnaround" (Cotton) – 2:40

== Charts ==
Chart (1976)	Position
Australia (Kent Music Report)	54
United States (Billboard 200)	59

== Track-by-track personnel ==
"Rose of Cimarron"

- Rusty Young – acoustic and 12-string electric guitars, mandolin, banjo, dobro
- Timothy B. Schmit – vocals, bass, harmonica
- Paul Cotton – vocals, electric and acoustic guitars
- George Grantham – vocals, drums, timpani
- Mark Henry Harman – celesta
- Milt Holland – percussion
- Tom Sellers – grand piano, string arrangements
- Sid Sharp – concertmaster

"Stealaway"

- Rusty Young – electric and acoustic guitars, banjo
- Timothy B. Schmit – vocals, bass
- Paul Cotton – vocals, lead electric and acoustic guitars
- George Grantham – vocals, drums

"Just Like Me"

- Timothy B. Schmit – vocals, bass
- Paul Cotton – vocals, acoustic and electric guitars
- George Grantham – vocals, drums
- Rusty Young – pedal steel guitar

"Company's Comin'/Slow Poke"

- Rusty Young – vocals, banjo, dobro, mandolin, pedal steel guitar, hand claps
- Paul Cotton – vocals, electric and acoustic guitars, hand claps
- Timothy B. Schmit – vocals, bass, hand claps
- George Grantham – vocals, drums, hand claps
- John Logan – banjo
- Al Garth – fiddle
- Milt Holland – washboard
- Annie Emery – hand claps
- Jenny Grantham – hand claps
- Jennifer O'Keefe – hand claps
- Doug Rider – hand claps
- Jeddrah Schmit – hand claps
- Noreen Schmit – hand claps

"Too Many Nights Too Long"

- Paul Cotton – vocals, Spanish guitar, 6 and 12-string electric guitars
- Timothy B. Schmit – vocals (including Spanish), bass
- George Grantham – vocals, drums
- Rusty Young – mandolin
- Al Garth – violin
- Steve Ferguson – acoustic piano
- Milt Holland – marimba, percussion

"When You Come Around"

- Paul Cotton – vocals, electric and acoustic guitars
- George Grantham – vocals, drums
- Timothy B. Schmit – vocals, bass
- Rusty Young – pedal steel guitar
- Al Garth – fiddle
- Steve Ferguson – acoustic piano

"Starin' at the Sky"

- Timothy B. Schmit – vocals, bass
- George Grantham – vocals, drums
- Paul Cotton – 12 and 6-string acoustic guitars
- Rusty Young – mandolin
- John Logan – banjo
- Al Garth – alto saxophone
- Steve Ferguson – electric piano

"All Alone Together"

- Paul Cotton – vocals, 6 and 12-string acoustic guitars
- George Grantham – vocals, drums
- Rusty Young – pedal steel guitar
- Timothy B. Schmit – vocals, bass
- Al Garth – fiddle
- Steve Ferguson – acoustic piano

"Tulsa Turnaround"

- Paul Cotton – vocals, acoustic guitar
- Rusty Young – dobro
- George Grantham – drums
- Timothy B. Schmit – bass
- Al Garth – fiddle
- Steve Ferguson – acoustic piano

== Production ==
- Poco – producers
- Mark Henry Harman – producer, engineer
- Doug Rider – engineer
- Wally Traugott – mastering
- Capitol Mastering (Hollywood, California) – mastering location
- Phil Hartman – art direction, design
- Tom Wilkes – art direction, design
- Sandy Sussman – color reproduction
- Guy Webster – photography
- Dennis Jones – road manager
