= Lake Mayfield =

Lake in Washington state, U.S.

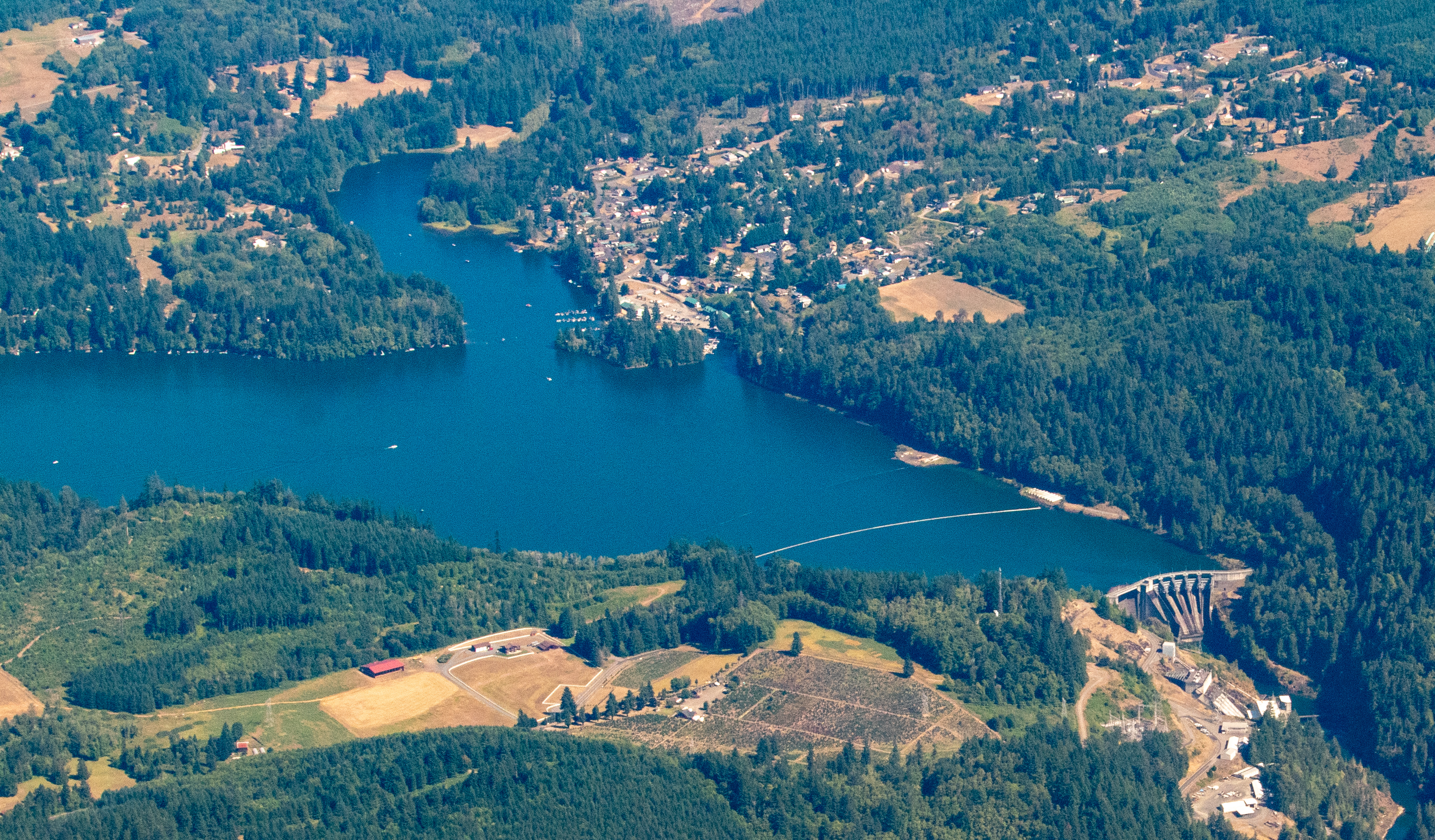
- Lake Mayfield and Mayfield Dam

- Location within Washington (state) Location within the United States
- Location: Lewis County, Washington, U.S.
- Coordinates: 46°30′14″N 122°35′19″W
- Type: reservoir
- Primary inflows: Cowlitz River, Tilton River
- Primary outflows: Cowlitz River
- Basin countries: United States
- Surface elevation: 427 ft (130 m)
- Islands: 1, Harold Freece Island

Lake Mayfield is a reservoir located near Mossyrock, Washington, in Lewis County. It was created by Mayfield Dam on the Cowlitz River, one of the dams in the Columbia River watershed.

== History ==
The Mayfield Dam was constructed in 1963 as a concrete arch and gravity dam. At 250 feet (76 m) high and capable of generating 162 megawatts, it supplies Tacoma Power with a large percentage of its entire hydroelectric power supply, second only to Mossyrock Dam.

== Environment and ecology ==
The lake is home to tiger muskies. Tiger muskies were introduced in 1993 to help control northern pikeminnow (squawfish) populations. In 1997, after an act of vandalism that destroyed a bald eagle nest near the lake, an artificial nest was built with help from a Boy Scout troop from Shoreline.

== Recreation ==
The Cowlitz River Arm is significantly colder than the rest of the lake due to its proximity to the Riffe Lake which is created by Mossyrock Dam. The water from Riffe Lake flows through the Mossyrock Powerhouse's two hydroelectric generators. The Tilton River arm is much warmer and shallower due to past landslides. Ike Kinswa State Park is located on a peninsula bounded by the Cowlitz River and the Tilton River. The lake contains an island with a lighthouse.

Throughout the 1980s and 1990s, there were many water ski and wake board tournaments held on the lake's Winston Creek arm where the Lake Mayfield Resort is located. The Mayfield Lake Youth camp is located up the Winston Creek arm adjacent to the Winston Creek Falls.

== See also ==
- List of dams in the Columbia River watershed
- List of geographic features in Lewis County, Washington
- List of lakes in Washington
