= Rose of Cimarron (song) =

Single by Poco

from the album Rose of Cimarron
- B-side: "Tulsa Turnaround"
- Released: October 1976
- Recorded: 1976
- Genre: Country rock
- Length: 6:42
- Label: ABC
- Songwriter: Rusty Young
- Producers: Poco, Mark Henry Harman

Poco singles chronology
| "Makin' Love" (1975) | "Rose of Cimarron" (1976) | "Indian Summer" (1977) |

"Rose of Cimarron" is a song by country rock band Poco and the title cut of their 1976 album release Rose of Cimarron: written by founding member Rusty Young, the song featured lead vocals by Paul Cotton and Timothy B. Schmit.

== Poco version - inspiration and impact ==
Rose of Cimarron is the sobriquet given in American frontier lore to Rose Dunn, who at age 15 was romantically involved with and an accomplice of the outlaw George Newcomb. Rusty Young learned of Dunn through a brochure he chanced upon while in Oklahoma during Poco's 1973 tour. "It told a story of a woman who took in outlaws in the 1800s. She fed them, mended their wounds and sent them on their way. Or so they say".

In 1976 Young was asked by his friend, actor and aspiring record producer Stuart Margolin, if he could compose a cowboy song for a comeback album Margolin planned to produce for veteran western performer Roy Rogers. Young remembered the brochure on Rose Dunn and came up with the song "Rose of Cimarron". The Roy Rogers album never reached fruition but Young's bandmates Paul Cotton and Timothy B. Schmit heard "Rose of Cimarron" and wanted Poco to record it.

Issued as a single in October 1976 - the 6:42 album track being edited to 3:14 - "Rose of Cimarron" reached #94 on the Billboard Hot 100. The track also became Poco's only charting single in Australia where it charted as high as #51. In the UK the single was released in its full album format of 6:42. Cash Box said of it that "the harmonies are really good, if a trifle predictable, and the arrangement is more sophisticated than usual."

In a June 7, 2013 interview with Rockin' Rich Lynch of SoundPress.net Radio Network, Cotton, whose tenure with Poco would be second only to Rusty Young's, would describe "Rose of Cimarron" as being his favorite Rusty Young composition. Young himself has cited "Rose of Cimarron" as the Poco song which he's most proud of having written: "I love everything about that song - from the very visual lyrics to the beautiful melody."

=== Charts ===
| Chart (1976) | Position |
|---|---|
| Australia (Kent Music Report) | 51 |
| United States (Billboard 100) | 94 |

== Other versions ==
The German duo Hoffmann & Hoffmann made their recording debut with a German language rendering which despite retaining the title of the original English-language song eschews Young's frontier scenario instead relating how a suicidal Luftwaffe pilot flies over the ocean until his plane runs out of fuel and plummets: this version is subtitled "Trag Mich Zu Den Sternen".

The song was covered by Emmylou Harris for her 1981 album Cimarron giving the album its title. Sandy Posey also remade "Rose of Cimarron" for her 1982 album Tennessee Rose.

Rusty Young on remaking
"Rose of Cimarron" as a duet
The song is about a woman so I thought it would be interesting to revisit it including a woman's voice. That idea inspired me to write additional lyrics. Then, when I first heard Chelsea's voice, I thought she'd be perfect for the new version.

In 2017, Rusty Young recorded "Rose of Cimarron" as a duet with female vocalist Chelsea Williams which track - recorded at the Cash Cabin Studio in Hendersonville TN - augments Young's original composition with additional lyrics and a new musical section.
