= Salkum, Washington =

Unincorporated community in Washington, United States

- Unincorporated community
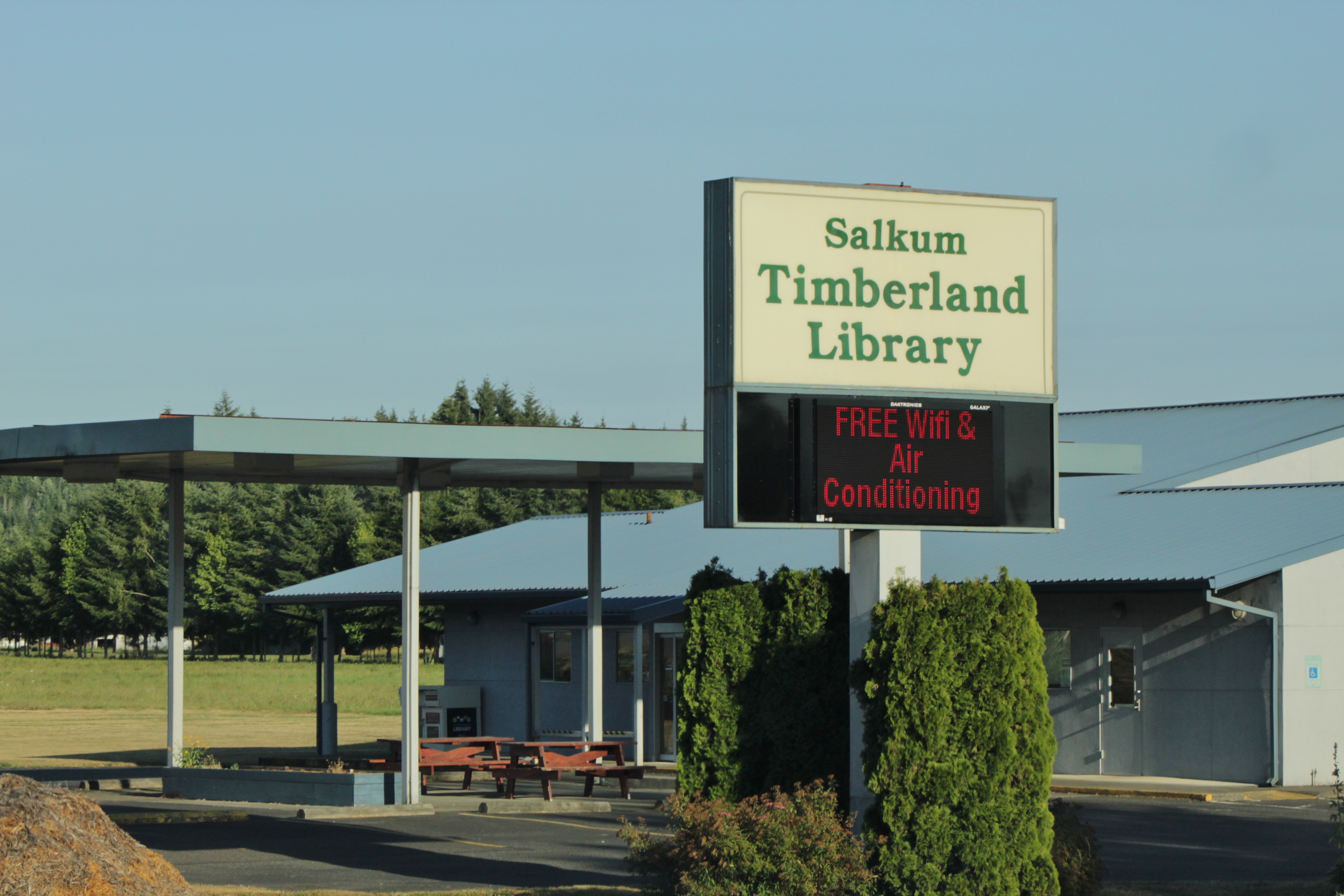
- Salkum Timberland Library in Salkum, WA

- Location within Washington (state) Location within the United States
- Coordinates: 46°31′55″N 122°37′33″W
- Country: United States
- State: Washington
- County: Lewis
- Elevation: 560 ft (170 m)
- Time zone: UTC-8 (Pacific (PST))
  - Summer (DST): UTC-7 (PDT)
- ZIP Code: 98582
- Area code(s): 360, 564

Salkum is a rural unincorporated community in Lewis County, Washington. The town is located on U.S. Route 12 and is 2.1 miles (3.4 km) west of Silver Creek.

== Etymology ==
The area was a village of the Cowlitz Indian Tribe. Salkum is a Cowlitz Indian word meaning "boiling water" or "boiling up", a reference to a nearby series of waterfalls on Mill Creek. The waterway was once known as Salkum Creek and the community took its name from the prior moniker.

== History ==
The first non-Native settlers built a grist mill at Mill Creek in 1881, beginning the town's future. The community, lacking immediate access to local roads, was served by a steamer that traveled the Cowlitz River, bringing supplies to residents and in return, shipping grain and livestock to regional markets. A dock once existed on Mill Creek, the original location of the Salkum settlement. A post office was established in 1882 and moved in 1890, shifting the town's center two miles north. Salkum became a timber community, producing lumber until the 1930s when the sawmills shut down.

Salkum opened its first library, as part of the Timberland Regional Library system, in 1986 as a test to expand library services to rural communities. Proving successful, the community refurbished an unoccupied gas station and the library was moved into the larger building in 1993.

== Infrastructure ==
Salkum is among 8 locations that are part of an EV installation project on the White Pass Scenic Byway. The program will stretch from the White Pass Ski Area to Chehalis and is run in partnership with Lewis County PUD, Twin Transit, state government agencies, and local community efforts. The venture began in 2023 from two grants totaling over $1.8 million.

== Government and politics ==
Presidential Elections Results Salkum Precinct
| Year | Republican | Democratic | Third parties |
|---|---|---|---|
| 2008 | 68.5% 252 | 28.5% 105 | 3.0% 11 |
| 2012 | 66.6% 261 | 31.4% 123 | 2.0% 8 |
| 2016 | 71.8% 280 | 22.3% 87 | 5.9% 23 |
| 2020 | 70.8% 381 | 26.6% 143 | 1.4% 11 |
| 2024 | 70.6% 414 | 26.5% 155 | 2.9% 17 |

=== Politics ===
As Salkum is an unincorporated community, there are no defined bounds, and the precinct may be incongruous with the census boundaries. Silver Creek Precinct may include voters in Salkum.

Third parties receiving votes in the 2020 election were the Libertarian Party and Green Party, and there were 3 votes for write-in candidates. In the 2024 election, there were four votes cast for write-in candidates and 7 votes were tallied for Robert F. Kennedy Jr..
