= Mossyrock, Washington =

City in Washington, United States

Mossyrock
- City
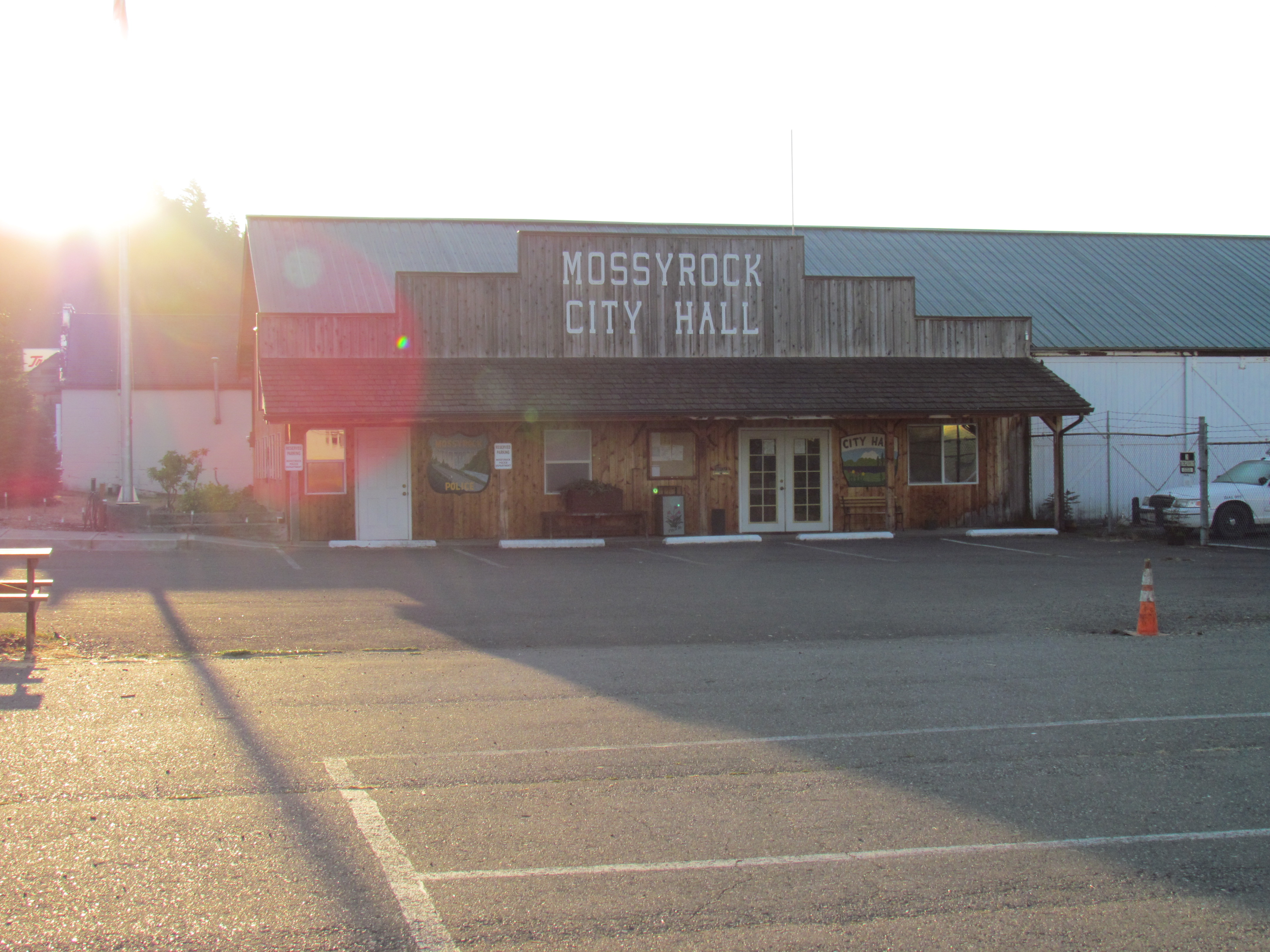

- Location of Mossyrock, Washington
- Coordinates: 46°31′52″N 122°29′48″W
- Country: United States
- State: Washington
- County: Lewis

Government
  - Type: Mayor–council
  - Mayor: Randall Sasser

Area
  - Total: 0.69 sq mi (1.78 km^{2})
  - Land: 0.69 sq mi (1.78 km^{2})
  - Water: 0 sq mi (0.00 km^{2})
- Elevation: 659 ft (201 m)

Population (2020)
  - Total: 768
  - Density: 1,192.9/sq mi (460.58/km^{2})
- Time zone: UTC-8 (Pacific (PST))
  - Summer (DST): UTC-7 (PDT)
- ZIP Code: 98564
- Area code(s): 360, 564
- FIPS code: 53-47315
- GNIS feature ID: 2411175
- Website: cityofmossyrock.com

Mossyrock is a city in Lewis County, Washington, United States. The population was 768 at the 2020 census.

== History ==
The city began as a trading post named Mossy Rock in 1852, after a 200-foot (61 m) high moss-covered rock at the east end of Klickitat Prairie. The Indian name for the area of Mossyrock was Coulph.

Many settlers of Mossyrock emigrated from West Virginia.

Mossyrock was officially incorporated on January 2, 1948.

The city council, in late 2020, voted to disregard requirements for restaurants as set forth by state laws that were introduced due to the COVID-19 pandemic. The council admitted that it could not supersede state authority. Dining establishments in Mossyrock continued to follow COVID-19 guidelines.

== Geography ==
According to the United States Census Bureau, the city has a total area of 0.68 square miles (1.76 km^{2}), all of it land.

== Demographics ==
Historical population
Census	Pop.	Note	%±
1950	356		—
1960	344		−3.4%
1970	409		18.9%
1980	463		13.2%
1990	452		−2.4%
2000	486		7.5%
2010	759		56.2%
2020	768		1.2%
U.S. Decennial Census; 2020 Census

=== 2020 census ===
As of the 2020 census, Mossyrock had a population of 768. The median age was 35.0 years. 29.0% of residents were under the age of 18 and 16.1% of residents were 65 years of age or older. For every 100 females there were 107.6 males, and for every 100 females age 18 and over there were 107.2 males age 18 and over.

There were 290 households in Mossyrock, of which 41.4% had children under the age of 18 living in them. Of all households, 40.7% were married-couple households, 25.9% were households with a male householder and no spouse or partner present, and 24.1% were households with a female householder and no spouse or partner present. About 27.9% of all households were made up of individuals and 13.4% had someone living alone who was 65 years of age or older. There were 323 housing units, of which 10.2% were vacant. The homeowner vacancy rate was 5.1% and the rental vacancy rate was 7.6%.

0.0% of residents lived in urban areas, while 100.0% lived in rural areas.

Racial composition as of the 2020 census
Race	Number	Percent
White	442	57.6%
Black or African American	1	0.1%
American Indian and Alaska Native	19	2.5%
Asian	4	0.5%
Native Hawaiian and Other Pacific Islander	0	0.0%
Some other race	164	21.4%
Two or more races	138	18.0%
Hispanic or Latino (of any race)	273	35.5%

=== 2010 census ===
As of the 2010 census, there were 759 people, 272 households, and 196 families living in the city. The population density was 1,116.2 inhabitants per square mile (431.0/km^{2}). There were 302 housing units at an average density of 444.1 per square mile (171.5/km^{2}). The racial makeup of the city was 71.0% White, 0.1% African American, 0.8% Native American, 0.1% Asian, 25.4% from other races, and 2.5% from two or more races. Hispanic or Latino of any race were 30.8% of the population.

There were 272 households, of which 41.9% had children under the age of 18 living with them, 46.3% were married couples living together, 16.9% had a female householder with no husband present, 8.8% had a male householder with no wife present, and 27.9% were non-families. 22.4% of all households were made up of individuals, and 7.3% had someone living alone who was 65 years of age or older. The average household size was 2.79 and the average family size was 3.24.

The median age in the city was 32.9 years. 30% of residents were under the age of 18; 8.9% were between the ages of 18 and 24; 27.4% were from 25 to 44; 21.2% were from 45 to 64; and 12.5% were 65 years of age or older. The gender makeup of the city was 51.5% male and 48.5% female.

=== 2000 census ===
As of the 2000 census, there were 486 people, 187 households, and 115 families living in the city. The population density was 1,112.5 people per square mile (426.5/km^{2}). There were 215 housing units at an average density of 492.2 per square mile (188.7/km^{2}). The racial makeup of the city was 90.3% White, 0.2% African American, 1.9% Native American, 0.2% Asian, 0.2% Pacific Islander, 3.5% from other races, and 3.7% from two or more races. Hispanic or Latino of any race were 6.8% of the population.

There were 187 households, out of which 30.5% had children under the age of 18 living with them, 43.3% were married couples living together, 13.4% had a female householder with no husband present, and 38.5% were non-families. 28.9% of all households were made up of individuals, and 12.8% had someone living alone who was 65 years of age or older. The average household size was 2.60 and the average family size was 3.20.

In the city, the population was spread out, with 29.6% under the age of 18, 11.3% from 18 to 24, 26.3% from 25 to 44, 19.3% from 45 to 64, and 13.4% who were 65 years of age or older. The median age was 32 years. For every 100 females, there were 93.6 males. For every 100 females age 18 and over, there were 102.4 males.

The median income for a household in the city was $29,750, and the median income for a family was $33,542. Males had a median income of $30,938 versus $16,250 for females. The per capita income for the city was $12,216. About 18.6% of families and 19.5% of the population were below the poverty line, including 18.9% of those under age 18 and 18.2% of those age 65 or over.

== Arts and culture ==
=== Festivals and events ===
The city hosts an annual, three-day Blueberry Festival the first weekend of August, honoring the local blueberry farming economy. Begun in 2006, the event's large turnout requires the entirety of Klickitat Prairie Park, with pie eating contests, farm tours, car shows and musical performances. The Mossyrock Area Action League, who oversee and schedule the festival, gear activities toward family-friendly fare, including attention towards children's games and crafts.

== Politics ==
Presidential Elections Results
Year	Republican	Democratic	Third parties
2008	60.4% 139	37.8% 87	1.7% 4
2012	58.0% 119	37.6% 77	4.4% 9
2016	60.4% 116	31.8% 61	7.8% 15
2020	70.3% 168	28.9% 69	1.4% 1
2024	72.0% 180	24.0% 60	3.2% 8

The Libertarian Party received a vote in the 2020 election and there was one vote for a write-in candidate.. In 2024, Robert F. Kennedy Jr., running as an independent, received 4 votes and two ballots were recorded for Jill Stein of the Green Party.

== Infrastructure ==
Mossyrock is among 8 locations that are part of an EV installation project on the White Pass Scenic Byway. The program will stretch from the White Pass Ski Area to Chehalis and is run in partnership with Lewis County PUD, Twin Transit, state government agencies, and local community efforts. The venture began in 2023 from two grants totaling over $1.8 million.

== Notable people ==
- Eli Kulp, chef
- Harry R. Truman, casualty of the 1980 eruption of Mount St. Helens
