= Forest, Washington =

Unincorporated community in Lewis County, Washington

- Unincorporated community
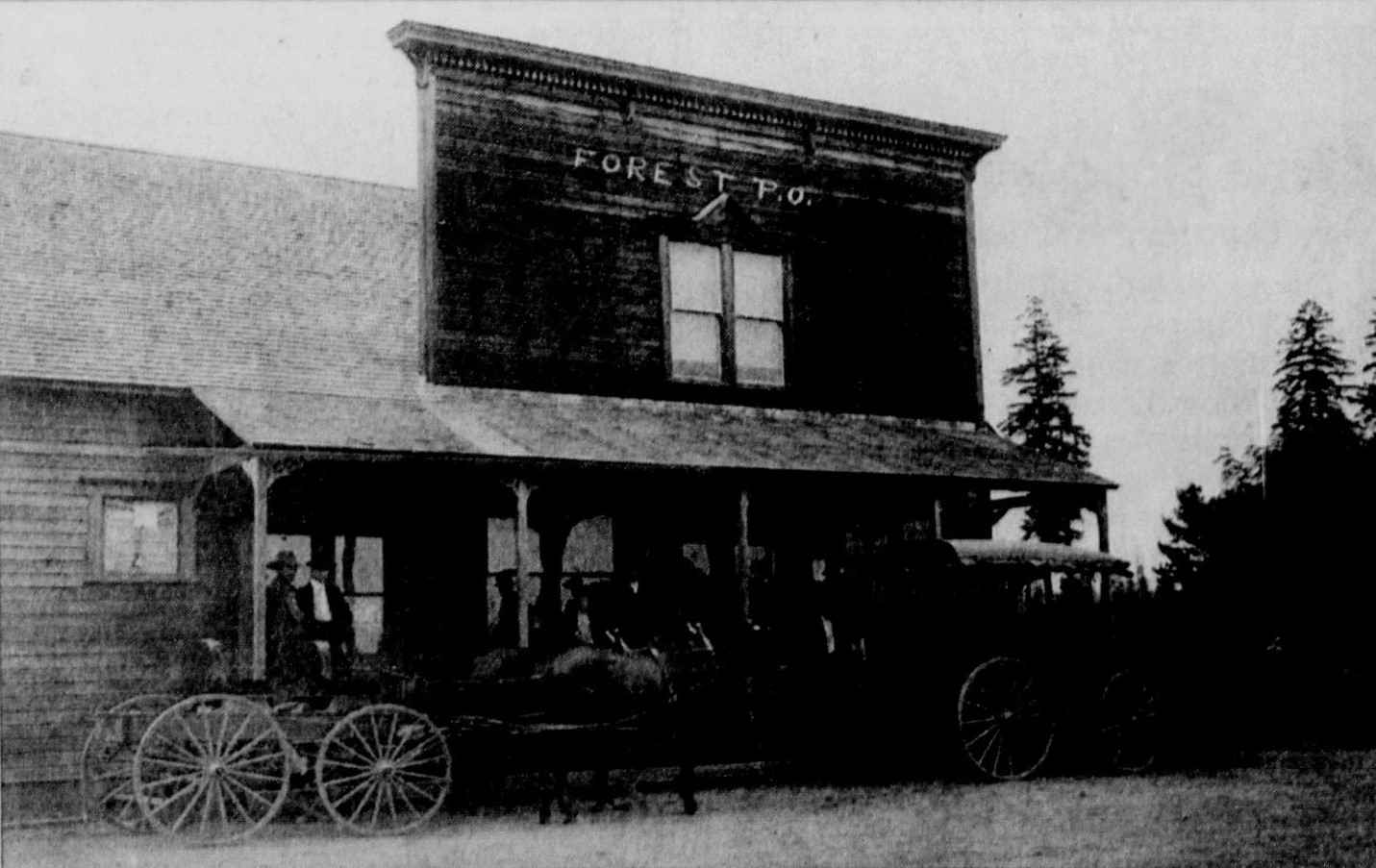
- Forest, Washington post office, 1919

- Location within Washington (state) Location within the United States
- Coordinates: 46°35′56″N 122°51′28″W
- Country: United States
- State: Washington
- County: Lewis
- Elevation: 305 ft (93 m)
- Time zone: UTC-8 (Pacific (PST))
  - Summer (DST): UTC-7 (PDT)
- ZIP Code: 98532
- Area code(s): 360, 564
- GNIS feature ID: 1504954

Forest is an unincorporated community in Lewis County, in the U.S. state of Washington. It is located on Jackson Highway, between the Port of Chehalis and Washington State Route 508 (SR 508).

== Etymology ==
Two reliable but differing accounts of the name of Forest exist. One theory is based on old-growth timber that grew in the area, while a second option posits that the moniker was taken after John T. Forrest, an early school teacher in the community.

== History ==
The first non-indigenous family to settle the area were the Berniers in the 1850s. Forest was founded in the 1890s and was often synonymously referred to as Newaukum Prairie. (Note: Newaukum Prairie was its own extensive landform. Reporting of Forest and other communities within the borders of the prairie were often given the blanket name of Newaukum Prairie. See sources throughout the page and connected articles in Lewis County.) Due to the town's location on Highway 99, Forest was described as a crossroads community where it was often used as a rest stop and a communal gathering spot for nearby residents. The early community once had a grist mill that began after 1875 but burned down in 1913.

The community was a site for a poor farm in the late 1890s. The site often housed destitute or disabled persons, and may have been a temporary location for persons that ran afoul of the law, as some were described as "inmates". During the Great Depression, the Forest Manor Retirement Home was built, remaining as a poorhouse. The site continued to operate during the 1930s but the building was abandoned before being renovated as a tuberculosis convalescence home in 1943. Known as the Macmillan Sanatorium, it lasted until the mid-1950s until becoming a nursing home; the grounds once again were used for retirement needs in the 1970s. By the 21st century, the building was remodeled and is used as a homeless shelter for women and children.

An open field located near the town was used as a makeshift airfield in the early 20th century. The community's sawmill, Newaukum River Lumber Company, burned down in March 1919; the fire was started by a serial arsonist suspected of being part of a larger "arson ring" that caused a multi-year spree of intentional fires in the Pacific Northwest. Forest was a location for a permanent Boy Scout campground with a log cabin; construction began in 1920.

Forest, due to its location near the Newaukum River, has a history of flooding. The community was included in updated FEMA flood maps in 2003, the first revised maps since the 1970s. The Newaukum Bridge, located in Forest and built in 1929, was replaced in 2011. The construction cut off traffic flow through the town as the highway was partially closed for a year. The replacement was also hampered by costs as well as caution over possible archaeological finds.

=== Post office ===
A post office was created and named in 1896 by the first postmaster, Amanda Monroe. (Note: Records also list the first postmaster as W.R. Monroe. See sources in section.) It was moved in 1897 and established in Forest's historic Trodahl store, remaining in operation until 1934. Early service routes from Chehalis were directed through Forest providing mail delivery to towns and communities located on present-day SR 508 or near Mayfield Lake and Riffe Lake. Joseph Gruener, owner of the mercantile business that became known as the Trodahl store, served as postmaster from 1897 to 1929.

At the combined post office and store, Greuner was shot in the back of the neck by a local resident, John Bernier, in August 1909. Bernier, and a male accomplice, were inebriated and the attempted murder was suspected to be a robbery of Gruener's store, though nothing was noted as being taken. The two men were arrested without incident, still intoxicated.

== Geography ==
Forest is located at the confluence of the north and south forks of the Newaukum River. The area is referred to as a crossroads community due its central proximity at a crossing of the Jackson Highway (previously part of U.S. Route 99) and an arterial that leads to Alpha and SR 508. The crossing was known as Stinky's Corner and Trodahl's Corner. Forest is situated between Chehalis to the north, and the communities of Klaus and Mary's Corner to the south.

== Arts and culture ==
=== Historic buildings and sites ===
==== Forest Grange ====
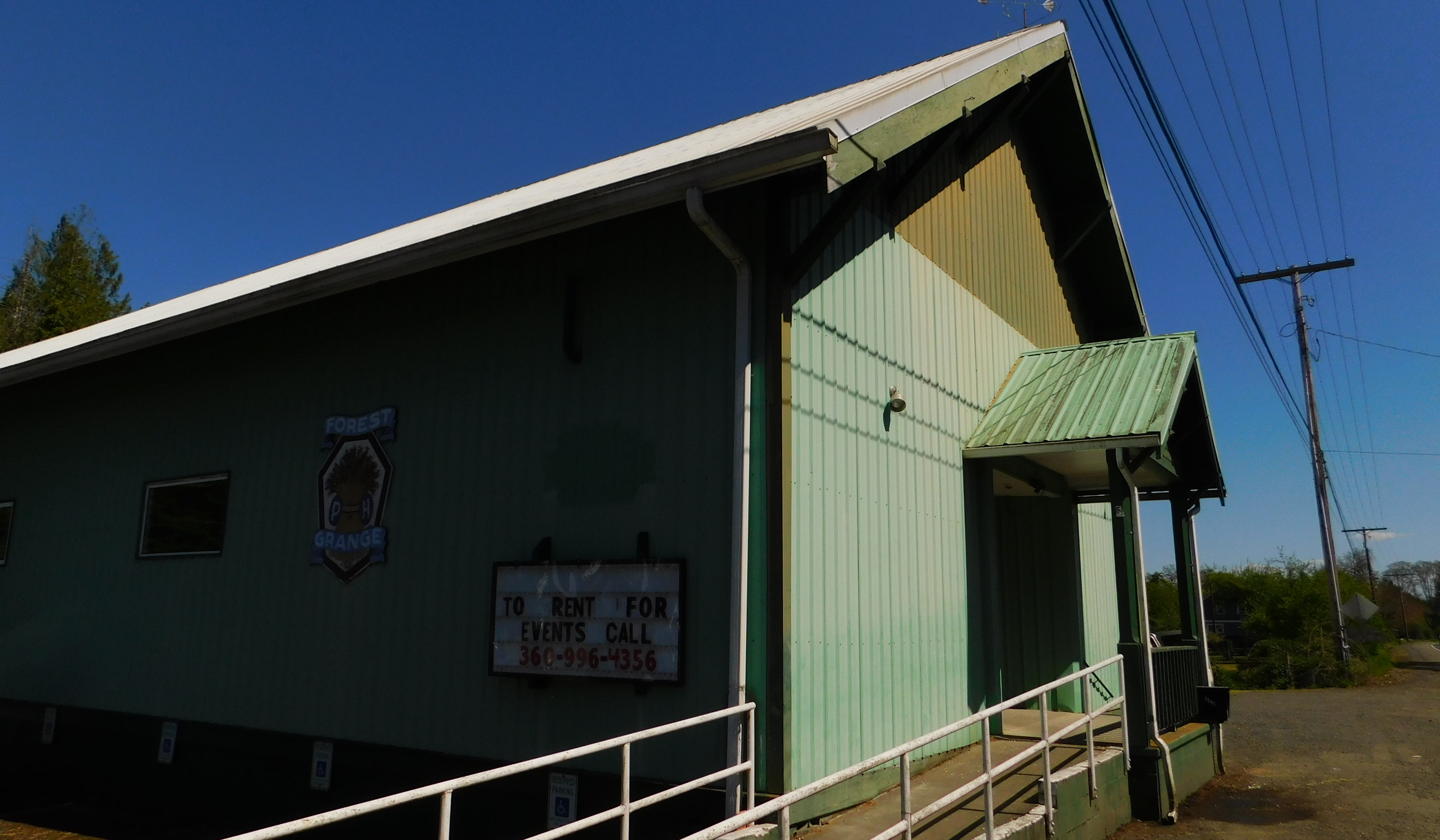
Forest Grange Hall, 2024

The Forest Grange, No. 153, was organized in 1904 along with granges in Alpha, Ethel, Silver Creek, St. Urban, and the Hope grange in Winlock. Though recognized for a time as the first granges formed in Lewis County, two granges had been structured in 1874. The grange celebrated a 100th anniversary in conjunction with its fellow halls in 2004. The social organization was first known as the Forest Union Grange in 1916, changing the name approximately 20 years later. At the dedication and opening of a new 40 ft × 100 ft (12 m × 30 m) hall in 1916, the grange counted 135 charter members. As of 2024, the Forest Grange and its hall is active.

==== Trodahl store ====
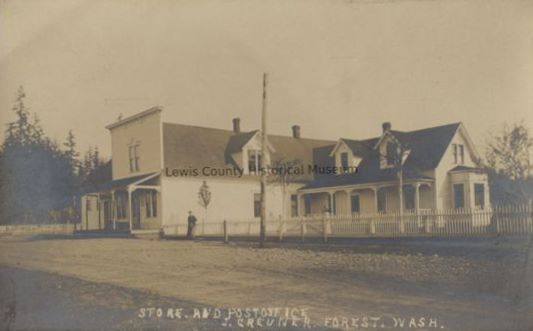
Greuner Store and post office, c. 1915

At the intersection of North Fork Road and Jackson Highway is the Trodahl store, an historic building first constructed in the 1880s and used as a stage stop and inn. The structure was expanded in the 1890s with an addition of an attached residence. In the 20th century the location began to be utilized as a general store first known as Greeners, after the Greuner family, until 1929. The location was renamed after the Trodahl family that operated the business until the 1980s, when it closed after financial hardship. The site, in 1993, became a convenience mart, continuing as such into the next century.

== Parks and recreation ==
East of Forest on Centralia-Alpha Road near the North Fork Newuakum River is the Thousand Trails campground. The site was founded in 1969 and opened in 1972, becoming the first Thousand Trails resort ever built.

== Education ==
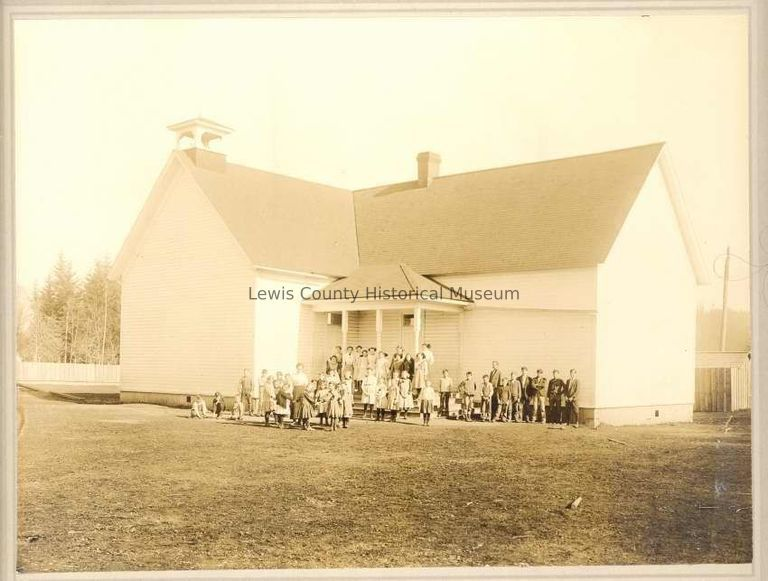
Forest Schoolhouse, c. 1911-1912

Forest was home to a two-room schoolhouse in the early-1900s and the building contained a belfry. Originally, the school held all classes up to 8th grade in one room, later partitioned into four sections. Enrollment numbers in the school's early days were moderate, with a report of 70 students in 1911.

A district consolidation occurred in 1910, creating the Forest School district No. 205. The following year, the Forest school, due to its location, length of school year, and well-regarded teachers, became the center point of a concentration of smaller schoolhouses in the Newaukum Valley. The school was given a special mention of high praise by the state's Department of Education.

In 1926, an $8,000 bond to construct a new school building was passed but was rejected the following year. The Works Progress Administration (WPA) built a $3,500 gym on the grounds in 1937. The original schoolhouse was destroyed by fire in 1946, though the gym and teacher's cottage were saved. After the loss of the West Side School in Chehalis during the 1949 Olympia earthquake, students traveled to Forest for their education. With the formal closure of the school by 1950, the grounds were still used, especially for a children's handicap education program in the mid-to-late 1950s. By 1966, the remaining structures had been available for rent and were officially put up for sale. The grounds of the Forest schoolhouse were listed as surplus in 1972.

== Government and politics ==
Presidential Elections Results
Year	Republican	Democratic	Third parties
2008	65.7% 350	32.8% 175	1.5% 8
2012	70.6% 367	27.9% 145	1.5% 8
2016	74.6% 397	19.0% 101	6.4% 34
2020	75.2% 530	22.7% 160	1.6% 11
2024	71.9% 501	25.1% 175	3.0% 21

=== Politics ===
Forest maintains a separate voting precinct from neighboring Chehalis and is recognized as being majority Republican and conservative.

The 2020 election included votes for the Libertarian Party candidate and there were 4 votes for write-in candidates. In the 2024 election, there were 3 votes cast for write-in candidates and 8 votes were tallied for Robert F. Kennedy Jr..

== Infrastructure ==
Around the turn of the 20th century, Forest was connected to Chehalis and Jackson Prairie, an area around present-day Mary's Corner, via a gravel and plank road; the thoroughfare became part of Highway 99 and Jackson Highway. A gas pipeline was proposed to be built through the community in 1964.
