= Ethel, Washington =

Unincorporated community in Washington, United States

- Unincorporated community
- Location within Washington (state) Location within the United States
- Coordinates: 46°31′56.8″N 122°44′49.4″W
- Country: United States
- State: Washington
- County: Lewis
- Elevation: 479 ft (146 m)
- Time zone: UTC-8 (Pacific (PST))
  - Summer (DST): UTC-7 (PDT)
- ZIP Code: 98542
- Area code(s): 360, 564

Ethel is an unincorporated community located along U.S. Route 12 in east Lewis County, Washington, United States. It sits between Mary's Corner and Salkum.

== History ==
A post office called Ethel was first established in 1886. The town's moniker was intended to be "Lacamas", after a creek that flowed through the town, however the Postmaster General at the time, William F. Vilas, declared that too many towns in Washington state were named after Native tribes, and choose Ethel, without an explanation. The reason and origins for the Ethel name, despite several theories, remains obscure.

Ethel's early economy was derived by the logging of old growth timber and farming. Education was provided at the Hopewell School, a one-room schoolhouse featuring eight different grade levels. The school would become the location for the Ethel Grange Hall. The town also formed teams to participate in Grange League baseball.

The community's post office, opened continuously since it was first established, was closed by the end of May 2026 under orders from the United States Postal Service (USPS). The branch closure was noted by the USPS to be caused by "lease expiration". The post office, which had been located in a country market store for several decades, had been upgraded by new owners of the business beginning in 2025. The proprietors had attempted to renegotiate with the USPS over an existing $200 per month lease. The Onalaska Post Office began serving Ethel residents.

== Arts and culture ==
=== Festivals and events ===
Ethel was home to the Cowlitz Prairie Grange Threshing Bee, an annual event that began in 1964. The threshing festival ended by 2019 when a property lease with the Cowlitz Grange was not renewed. A new festival, known as Olsen Fields Progress Days, was begun in 2022. Similar to the bee, the weekend exhibition includes competitive tractor pulls and a collection of old farm equipment, including vintage threshing and harvesting machines.

=== Historic buildings and sites ===
Located on US 12 in Ethel is the Hadaller (Onalaska-Ethel Grains) Barn, a heritage barn listed under the Washington State Heritage Barn Register (WSHBR). The structure was built in 1932 and contains a brick silo, a rare feature that was possibly added to the site in the mid-20th century.

== Government and politics ==
Presidential Elections Results
Year	Republican	Democratic	Third parties
2008	68.0% 453	29.3% 195	2.7% 18
2012	66.4% 466	29.9% 210	3.7% 26
2016	71.9% 2016	23.7% 100	4.4% 10
2020	71.7% 654	25.4% 232	1.7% 26
2024	71.4% 638	24.5% 219	4.0% 36

=== Politics ===
As Ethel is an unincorporated community, there are no defined bounds, and the precinct may be incongruous with the census boundaries.

Third parties that received ballots in the 2020 election include 15 votes for the Libertarian Party and 4 votes for the Green Party. There were 5 votes for write-in candidates. In the 2024 election, there were 9 votes cast for write-in candidates and 16 votes were tallied for Robert F. Kennedy Jr..
