= OAHP =

OAHP is the Office of Archaeology and Historic Preservation and may be:

- Colorado Office of Archaeology and Historic Preservation
- Washington State Department of Archaeology and Historic Preservation
