= Barns of the Palouse =

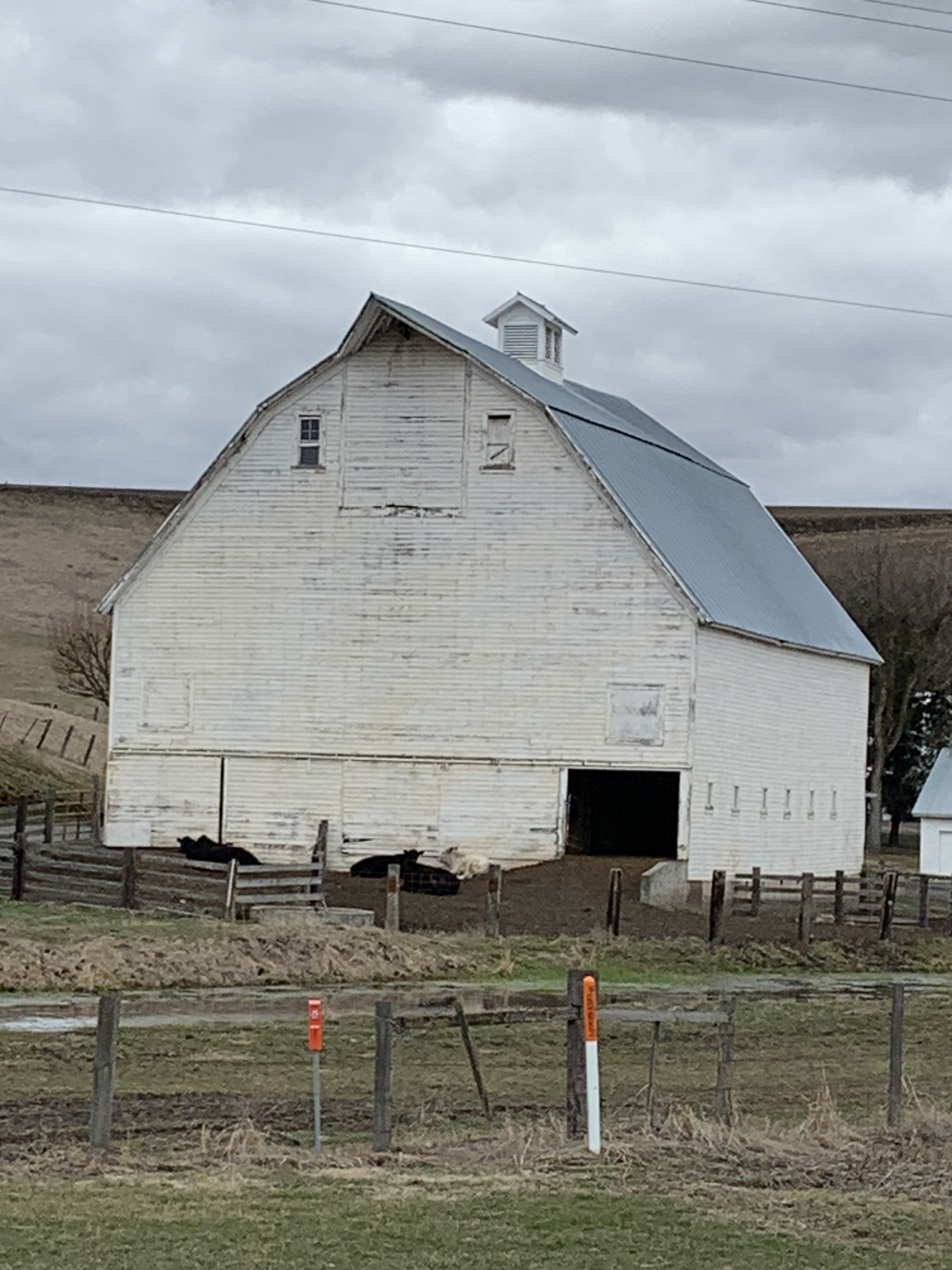
White barn near Idaho/Washington border

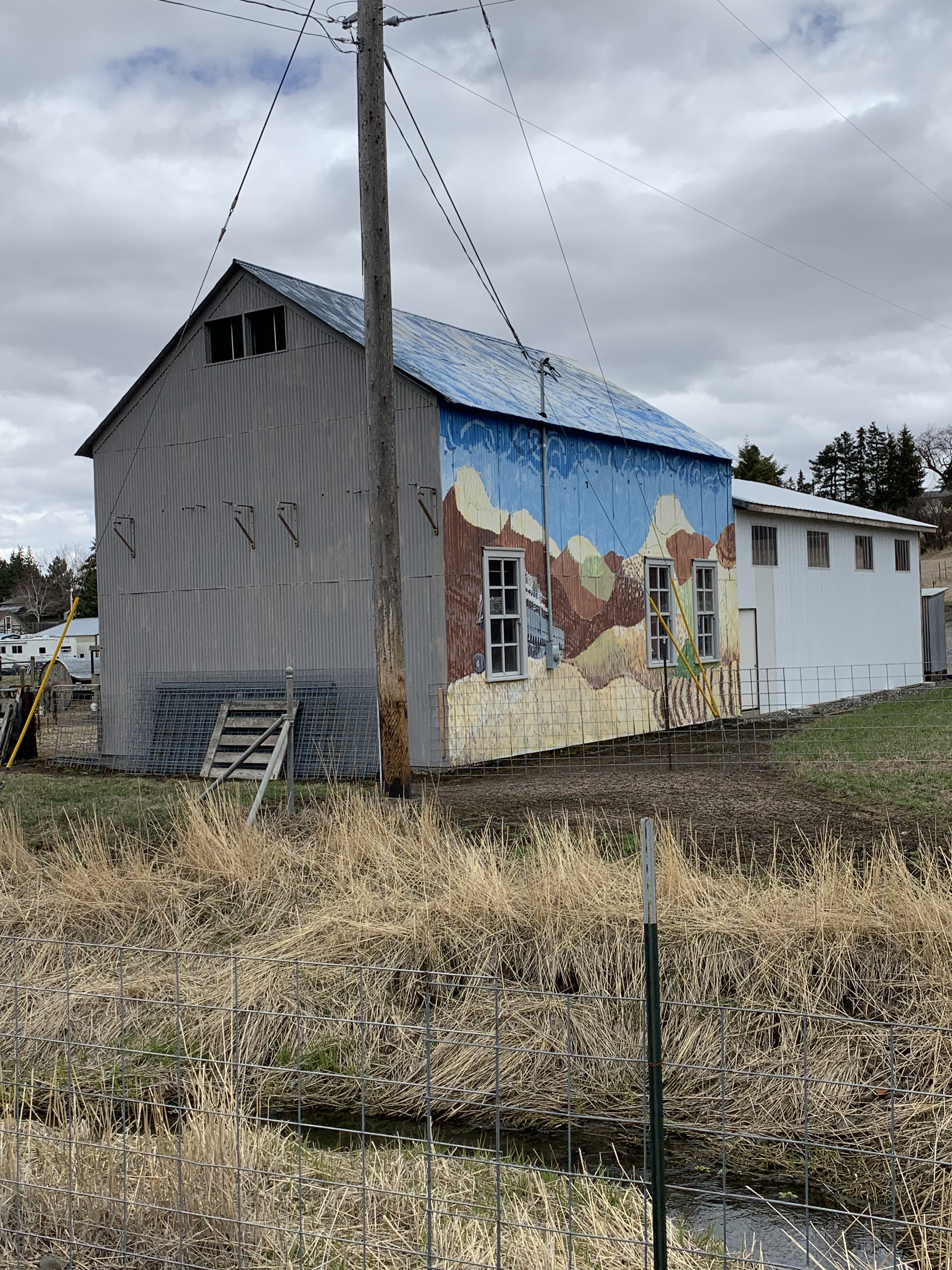
A painted barn in Uniontown, WA

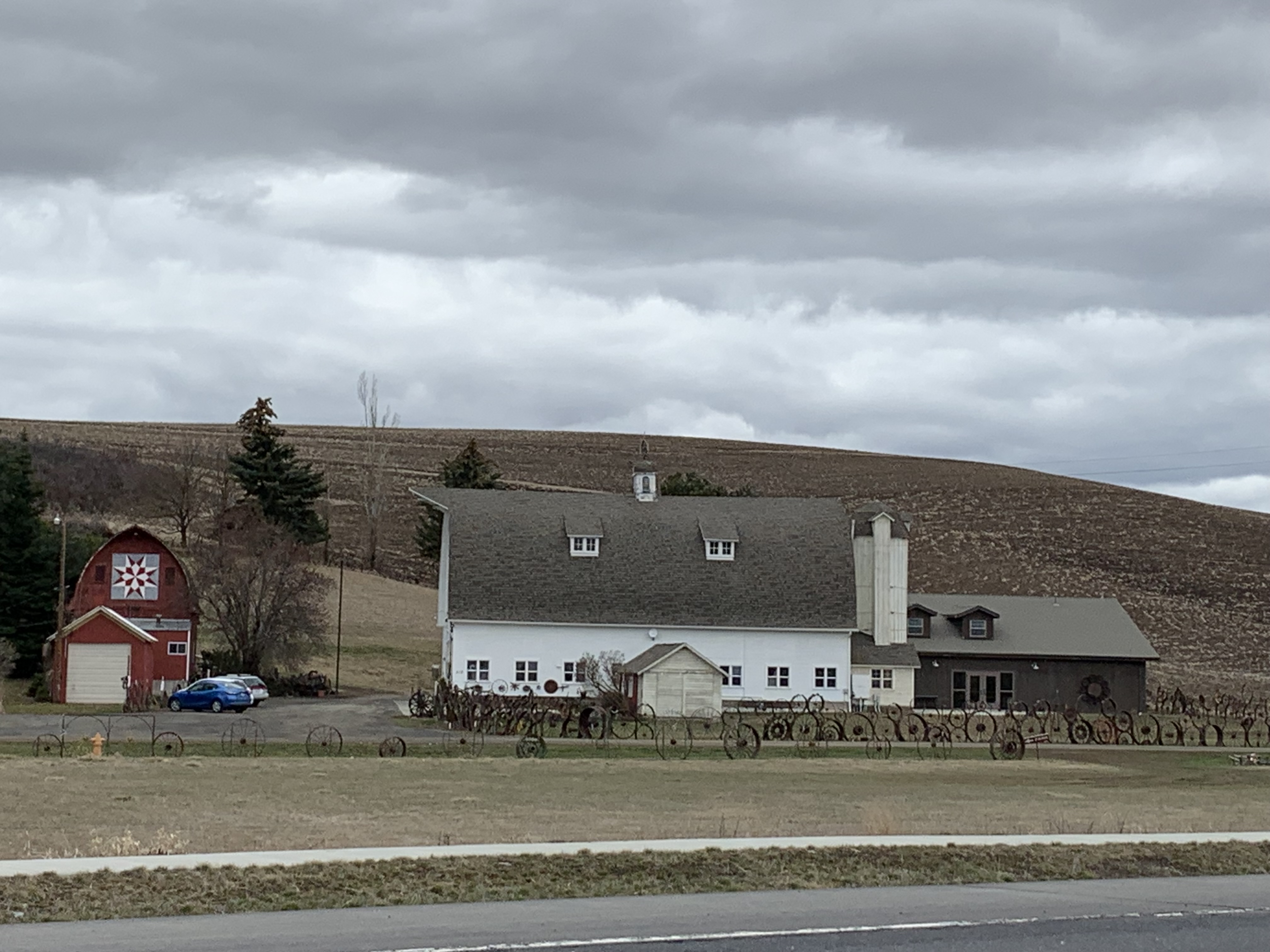
Dahmen Barn

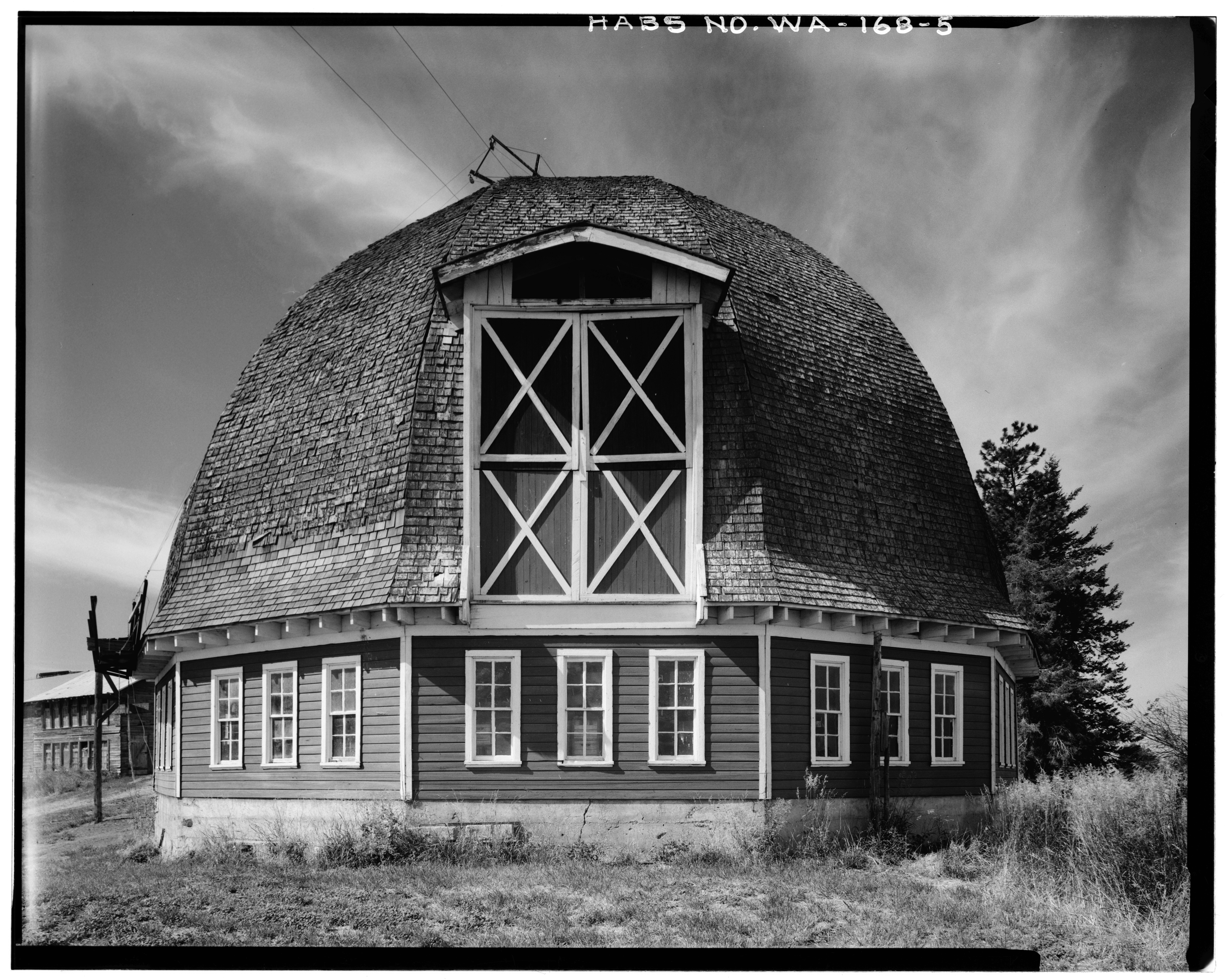
Leonard Round Barn, Old Moscow Highway, Pullman, WA

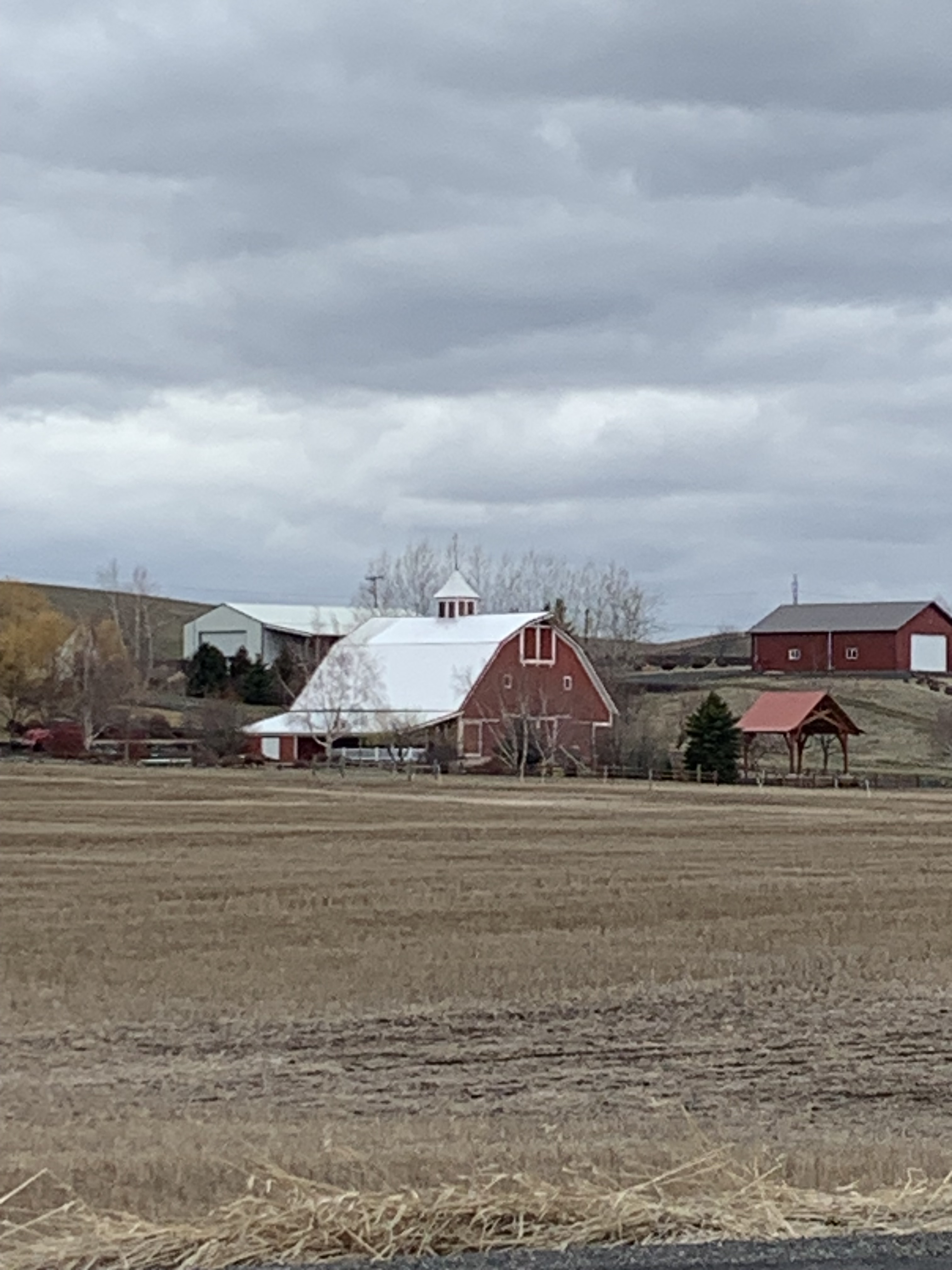
Red Barn Farms wedding venue

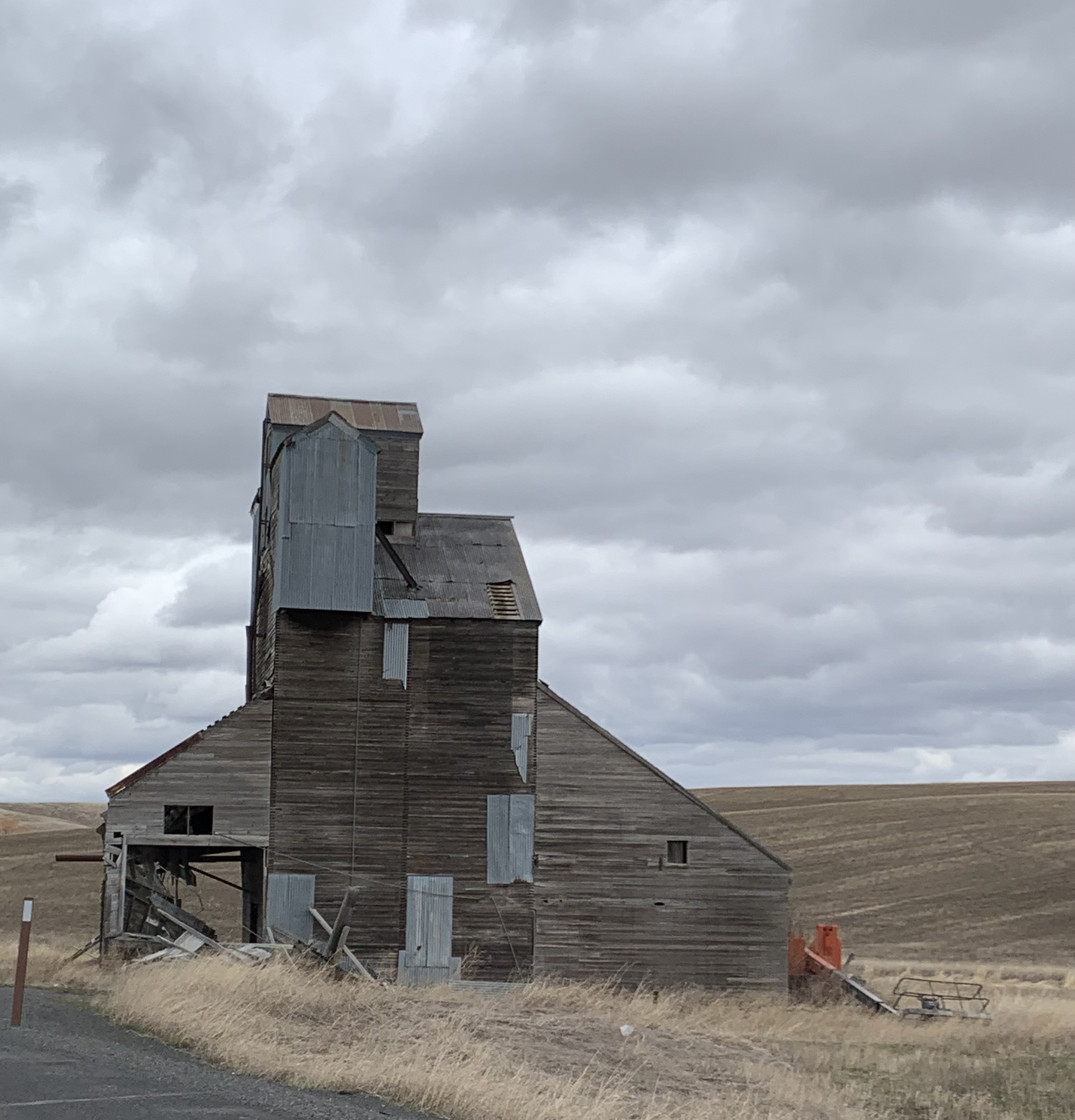
Collapsing barn near Pullman, Washington

Barns on the Palouse are popular with photographers and artists. Many of the barns on the Palouse are considered heritage barns. These barns are typically over 50 years old and have some historic qualities as determined by the Washington State Department of Archaeology and Historic Preservation.

== Barns ==
=== Washington barns ===
The Heritage Barn Advisory Committee report includes the Northwest and Southwest counties of Washington, and the Palouse area, which covers the easternmost portion of the Northeast and Southwest counties of Washington. In its 2010 report, the Heritage Barn Advisory Committee registered over 400 barns from across the state. The Washington state government established a funding program that provided grants to Heritage Barn owners to meet emergency needs for stabilizing and rehabilitating their barn structures. The funding prioritized agricultural use, and the criteria for funding included urgency of repairs, public visibility, and longterm upkeep. These grant funds were designed to keep these barns functional and in good working condition. Each recipient of a registered heritage barn receives a sign that displays the Heritage Barn logo as well as their barn's construction date. These metal placards are created by prisoners in the Washington State Penitentiary in Walla Walla.

==== Historic structures ====
One Palouse barn, the Bradley Barn near Spokane, Washington, was built to house 40 milk cows in 1904. The vertical support posts of this barn feature the names of 40 women in the community at that time. A Colville, Washington, barn, the Han Shan Barn, is a log barn. One of the oldest barns in Washington is the Dooley Barn in Walla Walla. The U.S. Government built this barn in the 1860s to shelter cavalry horses and mules that transported goods to various forts across the Washington Territory. The T.A. Leonard Barn is one of 20 round barns built between 1890 and 1920 and one of the 14 round barns still standing in Washington. The roof of this dairy barn is three times larger than its foundation.

=== Idaho barns ===
In the 1860s to 1870s, the area around Latah County shifted from a ranching economy to farming one. The Homestead Act of 1862 allowed settlers to claim 160 acres of public land, and the Timber Culture Act of 1873 granted land to settlers who cultivated and took care of trees on part of their acreage. Barns built prior to 1955 serve as the single most omnipresent agricultural structure in Latah County with many people investing money in rehabbing these vestiges of their families' farming history. Existing barns and other outbuildings on these pioneer subsistence farmsteads are eligible for registry on the National Register of Historic Places as long as they retain most of their original features, roof and siding notwithstanding. Most barns in Latah County have a rectangular design and were built to store hay or house dairy cows with some offering dual purposes. Some barns sheltered draft horses that helped plow fields. Palouse barns are 20-feet wider and longer than typical American barns to accommodate the high number of horses required for this agricultural work.

== Adaptive reuse ==
Some barns on the Palouse have experienced a second, contemporary use. Red Barn Farms in Colton, Washington, was built by the Meyer family in 1903. Four generations later, the barn and grounds are still in use but now as a wedding venue. The Dahmen Barn in Uniontown, Washington, was built in 1935 by Frank Wolf. Wolf built the barn for Jack Dahmen and his family for their commercial dairy farm. In 1953, it was purchased by Dahmen's nephew Steve and his wife Junette who had an appreciation for the arts. The art around the barn began with the construction of a wagon wheel fence and various metal sculptures. Volunteers with the Uniontown Community Development Association turned the barn into a multi-use space for artisans at work, a retail store, educational center, and performance venue.
