= Alpha, Washington =

Unincorporated community in Washington, United States

- Unincorporated community
- Location within Washington (state) Location within the United States
- Coordinates: 46°36′41″N 122°36′19″W
- Country: United States
- State: Washington
- County: Lewis
- Elevation: 728 ft (222 m)
- Time zone: UTC-8 (Pacific (PST))
  - Summer (DST): UTC-7 (PDT)
- ZIP Code: 98570
- Area code(s): 360, 564
- GNIS feature ID: 1515823

Alpha is an unincorporated community located in Lewis County, Washington. The town rests alongside Washington State Route 508, between Cinebar, 3.5 miles away to the east, and Onalaska to the west.

A post office existed from 1890 to 1954 but due to its rural setting with little settlement concentration, it did not meet qualifications as a Census Designated Place, a program used by the U.S. Census Bureau for unincorporated communities. Alpha appears on the Mayfield Lake U.S. Geological Survey Map.

The area has been named Alpha Prairie, Shoestring, and Tilton, with the current iteration chosen by either a local postmaster after the Greek letter or by settler Harold Hanson.

== Government and politics ==
=== Politics ===
Presidential Elections Results
| Year | Republican | Democratic | Third parties |
|---|---|---|---|
| 2008 | 64.5% 423 | 32.8% 215 | 2.7% 18 |
| 2012 | 64.5% 431 | 32.2% 215 | 3.3% 22 |
| 2016 | 69.3% 484 | 24.2% 169 | 6.4% 45 |
| 2020 | 71.0% 594 | 26.3% 220 | 2.8% 23 |
| 2024 | 71.7% 632 | 26.3% 232 | 2.0% 18 |

As Alpha is an unincorporated community, there are no defined bounds, and the precinct may be incongruous with the census boundaries.

The 2020 election included 16 votes for candidates of the Libertarian Party, 3 votes for the Green Party, and 4 votes for write-in candidates. In the 2024 election, there were 2 votes cast for write-in candidates and 8 votes were tallied for Robert F. Kennedy Jr..
