= Cinebar, Washington =

Unincorporated community in Washington, United States

- Unincorporated community
- Location within Washington (state) Location within the United States
- Coordinates: 46°36′15″N 122°31′54″W
- Country: United States
- State: Washington
- County: Lewis

Area
  - Total: 14.2 sq mi (37 km^{2})
  - Land: 14.1 sq mi (37 km^{2})
  - Water: .1 sq mi (0.26 km^{2})
- Elevation: 909 ft (277 m)

Population (2000)
  - Total: 517
  - Density: 36.5/sq mi (14.1/km^{2})
- Time zone: UTC-8 (Pacific (PST))
  - Summer (DST): UTC-7 (PDT)
- ZIP Code: 98533
- Area code(s): 360, 564
- GNIS feature ID: 1517781

Cinebar is an unincorporated community in Lewis County, Washington, United States. It is located between State Route 508 and U.S. Route 12. Named for the cinnabar present in the mountains to the northeast, Cinebar is a rural area with a post office and fire station on State Route 508. Other communities near Cinebar include Silver Creek, Salkum, Morton, Onalaska, Napavine, Chehalis, and Centralia.

== Parks and recreation ==
Tilton River State Park, between Cinebar and Morton, is a 102-acre natural area owned by the state. In 2017, the Washington Department of Fish and Wildlife proposed a project on the site to "provide fishing, river access and wildlife viewing. In the future it could provide a salmonid release site as well as habitat."

Other nearby attractions and points of interest include the Cowlitz River, the Tilton River, Lake Mayfield, Lake Mayfield Park, Mayfield Resort, and Ike Kinswa State Park. The community is situated approximately 10 miles (16 km) southwest of Newaukum Lake.

== Government and politics ==
=== Politics ===
Presidential Elections Results
Year	Republican	Democratic	Third parties
2008	65.0% 275	33.3% 141	1.7% 7
2012	64.4% 270	31.5% 132	4.1% 17
2016	74.4% 303	20.1% 82	5.4% 22
2020	74.6% 409	24.1% 132	1.3% 7
2024	73.8% 432	22.4% 131	3.8% 22

As Cinebar is an unincorporated community, there are no defined bounds, and the precinct may be incongruous with the census boundaries.

The 2020 election included 6 votes for candidates of the Libertarian Party. In the 2024 election, there were 2 votes cast for write-in candidates and 13 votes were tallied for Robert F. Kennedy Jr..
