= Newaukum Lake =

Lake in Lewis County, Washington

- Newaukum Lakes
- Location of Newaukum Lake in Washington state Newaukum Lake (the United States)
- Interactive map of Newaukum Lake
- Coordinates: 46°39′52.58″N 122°28′28.94″W
- Type: Lake
- Max. width: 0.25 miles (0.40 km)
- Surface area: 23.5 acres (9.5 ha) (approx. combined area of system)
- Salinity: Freshwater
- Surface elevation: 2,982 feet (909 m)
- Islands: None

Newaukum Lake, also known as the Newaukum Lakes, is a lake system located northeast of Cinebar, Washington in Lewis County. The system, a headwater of the Newaukum River, consists of a 17-acre (6.9 ha) main body of water known specifically as Newaukum Lake, along with two smaller basins and a pond.

The lake has been stocked with fish since the 1920s and though difficult to access due to a lack of infrastructure, is a popular site known for recreational fishing.

== History ==
On account of "natural barriers", the lake had been devoid of fish until a Lewis County game warden stocked the lake with 3,000 fish in 1922, which included 1,000 cutthroat trout. (Note: The full account of which species of fish were stocked in 1922 are not recorded. The game warden, O.J. Beusch, was reported to have stocked other lakes in the county, such as Packwood Lake, with various other species of trout, including eastern brook and rainbow.) Rainbow trout were introduced to the lake in 1948.

In August 1953, Navy divers from Keyport Naval Station recovered the body of Jack Dyce who drowned in the lake after falling from a raft. Hampered by the cold waters and muddy conditions of the lake bed, the divers found his body five days later after they were called into service upon requests from Dyce's friends.

== Geography ==
Reporting in the 1920s recorded the lake to reside at an elevation of 5,000 feet (1,500 m) in the Tildon hills. Later sources approximate the altitude at 3,000 feet (910 m). Officially, the Geographic Names Information System lists Newaukum Lake at an elevation of 2,982 feet (909 m). The width of the main lake is 0.25 miles (0.40 km).

The lake is located approximately 10 miles (16 km) northeast of Cinebar, Washington. Near the community is a trailhead to Newaukum Lake; the trail to the lake was noted in 1955 to be 5.5 miles (8.9 km) in length but by the early 2000s, hikers could reach the lake on foot, following the South Fork of the Newaukum River for 10 miles (16 km). Immediate access to the lake by automobile has historically been difficult as the area contains only forest service roads, which are usually unmarked or lack directional signage.

== Hydrology ==
Newaukum Lake is a headwater of the Newaukum River system. The body of water is also known as a lake system, the Newaukum Lakes, which consists of three small lakes and a pond located south of the main basin. The Newaukum Lake is the largest body at 17 acres (6.9 ha) in size, followed by two smaller lakes measuring approximately 2 acres (0.81 ha) and 4 acres (1.6 ha). The pond is estimated to be 0.5 acres (0.20 ha).

== Recreation ==
Newaukum Lake was reported to contain areas for camping by the 1950s. Recreational fishing for various species of trout is a popular activity on the lake. Crayfish can be caught in the 4-acre (1.6 ha) lake.

== See also ==
- List of geographic features in Lewis County, Washington
- List of lakes in Washington
