= Office of Archaeology and Historic Preservation =

The Office of Archaeology and Historic Preservation (OAHP) may be:

- Colorado Office of Archaeology and Historic Preservation
- Washington State Department of Archaeology and Historic Preservation
