= Washington State Route 508 =

State highway in Lewis County, Washington, US

State Route 508

- SR 508 highlighted in red

Route information
- Auxiliary route of I-5
- Maintained by WSDOT
- Length: 32.84 mi (52.85 km)
- Existed: 1964–present

Major junctions
- West end: I-5 / US 12 in Napavine
- East end: SR 7 in Morton

Location
- Country: United States
- State: Washington
- Counties: Lewis

Highway system
- State highways in Washington; Interstate; US; State; Scenic; Pre-1964; 1964 renumbering; Former
← SR 507	→ SR 509

State Route 508 (SR 508) is a 32.84-mile (52.85 km) long state highway located in Lewis County within the U.S. state of Washington, extending from an interchange with Interstate 5 (I-5) concurrent with U.S. Route 12 (US 12) in Napavine to SR 7 in Morton. By 1916, a road between Napavine and Cinebar was constructed on the current route of SR 508 and was signed in 1937 as Secondary State Highway 5K (SSH 5K) after being extended to Morton. SSH 5K became SR 508 in 1968 and since then, a segment in Bear Canyon has been reconstructed twice between 2007 and 2009 and a bridge over the Tilton River was reconstructed in 2009.

== Route description ==
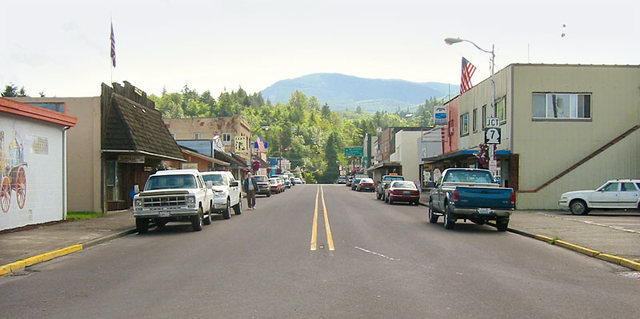
SR 508 eastbound as Main Avenue in Morton near the SR 7 intersection.

SR 508 begins at a diamond interchange with Interstate 5 (I-5) concurrent with U.S. Route 12 (US 12) within Napavine city limits. From the interchange, the highway leaves Napavine and travels southeast through an intersection with the Jackson Highway, formerly US 99, to bridge and parallel the South Fork of the Newaukum River, passing Onalaska and Alpha before unparalleling the river and continuing east to Cinebar. East of Cinebar, the roadway starts to parallel the Tilton River through Bear Canyon to Morton, where the road becomes Main Avenue and ends at SR 7, named Second Street. An estimated daily average of 5,000 motorists used the I-5 / US 12 / SR 508 interchange in 2007, making it the busiest section of the highway; the SR 7 intersection was the busiest section in 1970, with an estimated daily average of 3,200 motorists.

== History ==
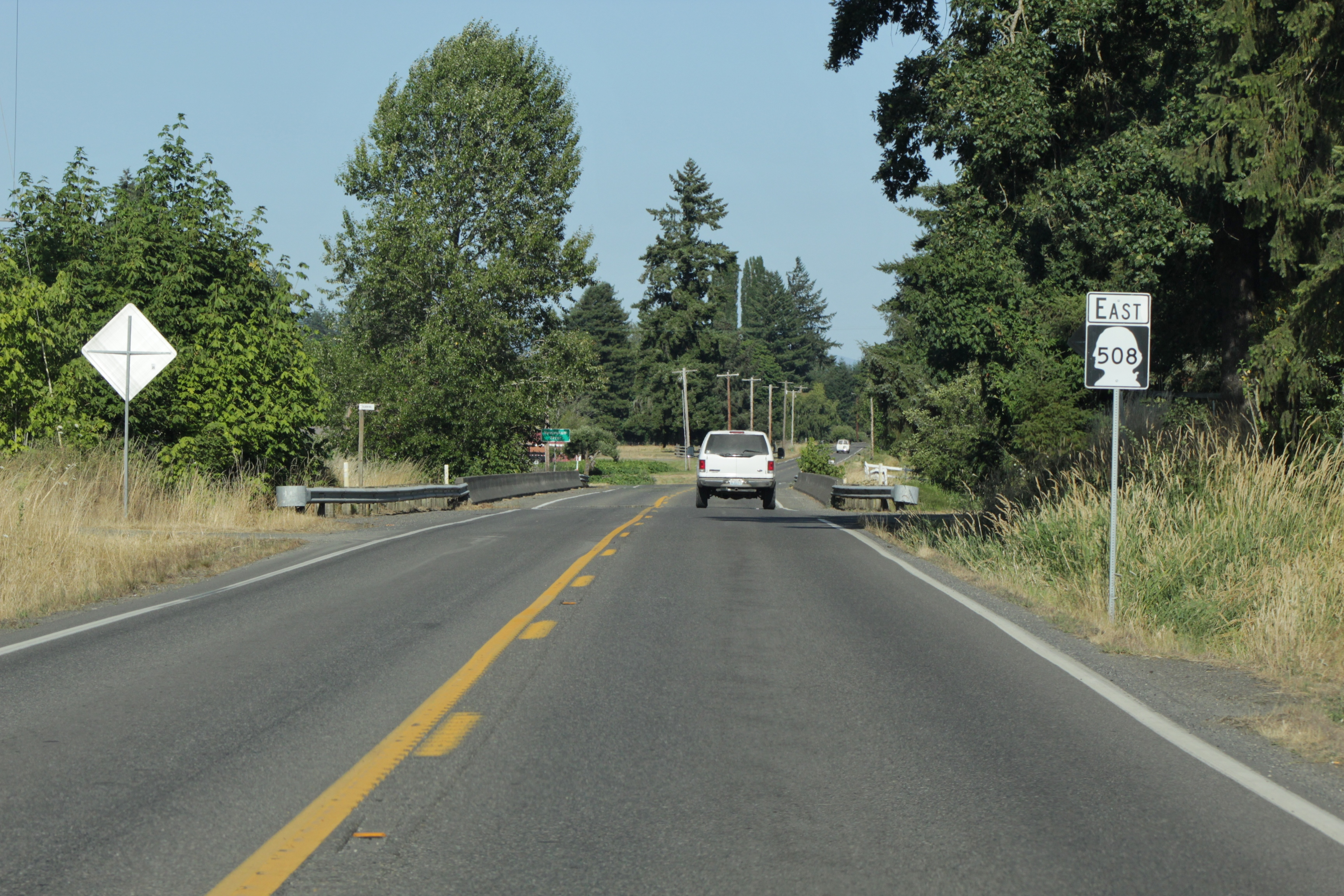
SR 508 eastbound near Napavine

A road paralleling the current route of SR 508 first appeared on a map in 1916, extending from Napavine to Cinebar. By 1937, the road was extended east to Morton and signed as Secondary State Highway 5K (SSH 5K) in the same year. SSH 5K ran from a branch of Primary State Highway 5 (PSH 5) in Morton west to PSH 1 east of Napavine. In 1964, a highway renumbering created SR 508 to replace SSH 5K. Between 1968 and 2008, SR 508 between I-5 and Onalaska used Forest Road and the Jackson Highway to get to Onalaska, but the route was later realigned.

A large flood event in December 1977, due to heavy rainfall and snow melt, severely impacted eastern Lewis County. A log jam led to the destruction of the route's 150 foot (46 metres)-tall Bear Canyon Bridge when the span's sole support tower was broken, fully collapsing the overpass. Located approximately 10 miles (16 km) west of Morton, the bridge was erected in the late 1890s and rebuilt twice in 1917 and 1934. Estimated to cost $2 million, the construction of the replacement bridge was not undertaken until 1982.

Additional floods and severe weather caused several further closures and washouts in the 21st century. In early November 2006, heavy rainfall at Bear Canyon resulted in erosion of a cliff on the highway that caused portions of the roadway to fall into the Tilton River. Construction of the repairs began April 23, 2007 and a limited opening happened on June 25. On July 27, the new road was opened, but during heavy snowfall between December 19 and 22, 2008 and the resulting floods in early January 2009, the area was washed out. On January 29, 2009, SR 508 was reopened through Bear Canyon. A bridge over the Tilton River west of Milton that was built in 1947 and three other bridges on the highway were classified as structurally deficient in 2008 and the Tilton River Bridge was partially closed in April 2009. The bridge, like Bear Canyon, was damaged during floods in January 2009 and reopened on June 11.

== Major intersections ==
The entire route is in Lewis County.

Location	mi	km	Destinations	Notes
Napavine	0.00	0.00	I-5 / US 12 – Chehalis, Kelso, Morton	
	2.44	3.93	Jackson Highway – Toledo, Chehalis	Former US 99
Morton	32.84	52.85	SR 7 (Second Street) – Elbe, Spanaway, Tacoma	
1.000 mi = 1.609 km; 1.000 km = 0.621 mi
