= Newaukum River =

River in Lewis County, Washington

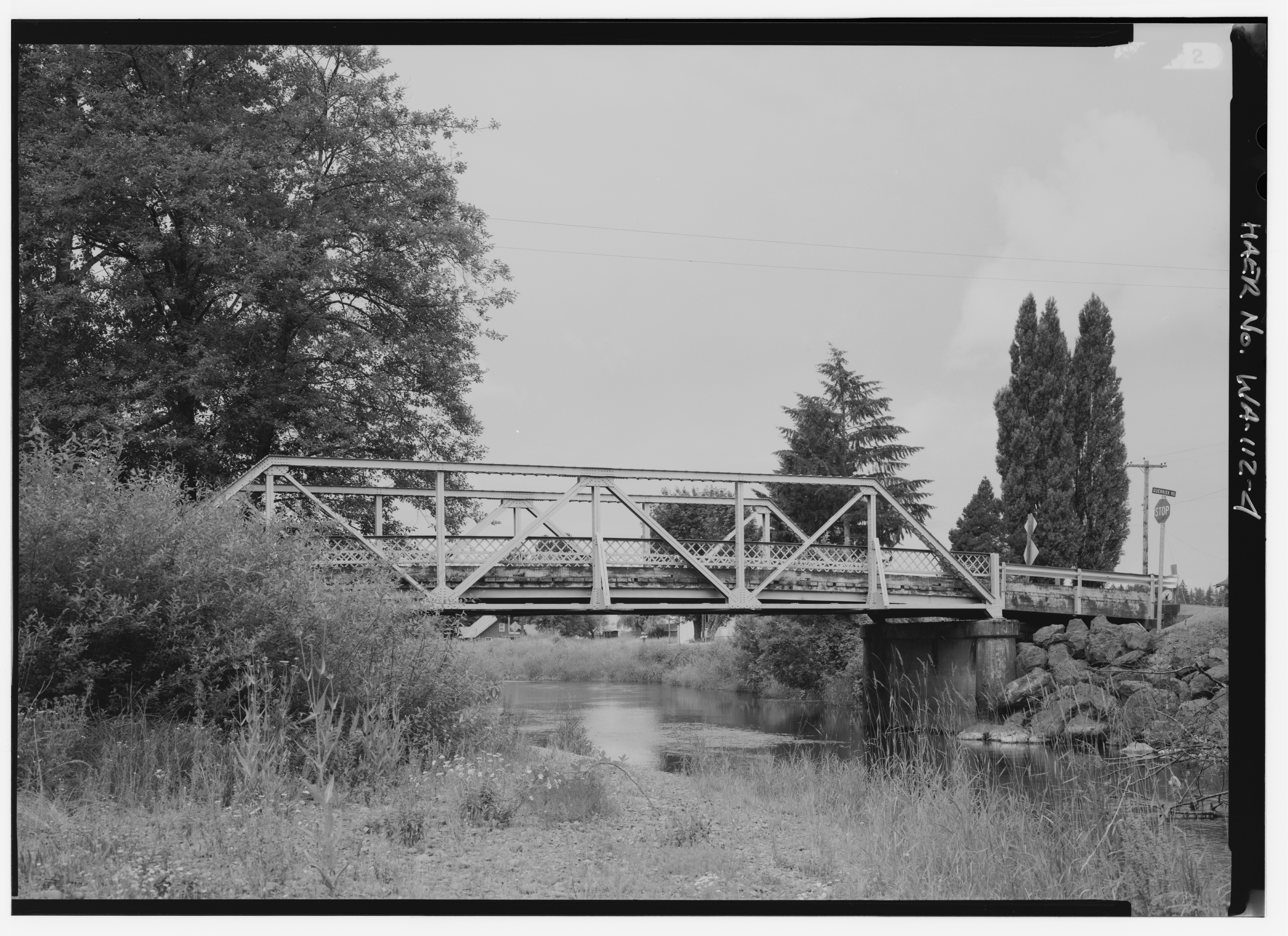
- South Fork crossing SR 508

- Location of the mouth of the Newaukum River in Washington

Location
- Country: United States
- State: Washington
- County: Lewis

Physical characteristics
- Source: Confluence of North and South Forks
  - coordinates: 46°36′18″N 122°51′19″W
- Mouth: Chehalis River
  - coordinates: 46°39′4″N 122°58′54″W
  - elevation: 161 ft (49 m)
- Length: 10.9 mi (17.5 km)
- Basin size: 173 sq mi (450 km^{2})
- Discharge
  - location: river mile 4.1 near Chehalis, WA
  - average: 500 cu ft/s (14 m^{3}/s)
  - minimum: 14 cu ft/s (0.40 m^{3}/s)
  - maximum: 10,200 cu ft/s (290 m^{3}/s)

Basin features
- Geographic Names Information System: 1506968

The Newaukum River is a tributary of the Chehalis River in the U.S. state of Washington. It has three main branches, the North Fork, South Fork, and Middle Fork Newaukum Rivers. The length of the three forks and the mainstem river is 56.7 miles (91.2 km).

The river's name comes from the Upper Chehalis word náwaq^{w}əm, meaning "big prairie".

== History ==
The removal of salmon culverts on the Middle Fork of the Newaukum River were completed in 2019. Part of a $46.2 million statewide project overseen by the Brian Abbott Fish Barrier Removal Board, the elimination of the barriers provides the opportunity for the return of Coho salmon.

The United States Geological Survey (USGS) monitors the river via calibrated "base flow" gauges. Due to reduced waterflow in summer 2023, the USGS could not use its gauge system to compare against historic lows of the water levels of the Newaukum.

== Course ==
=== Mainstem ===
Formed by the confluence of the North and South Forks in Newaukum Prairie, the mainstem Newaukum River flows generally west and north. After 10.9 miles (17.5 km), near the city of Chehalis, the Newaukum River empties into the Chehalis River, at Chehalis river mile 75.2.

=== Middle Fork ===
The Middle Fork Newaukum River, the shortest of the three forks, originates at 46.634549°N 122.654006°W. It flows southwest into Alpha Prairie. It turns west and flows through hillier terrain before entering the Newaukum Prairie and emptying into the North Fork Newaukum River.

=== North Fork ===
The North Fork Newaukum River originates in the Cascade Range at 46.707326°N 122.587617°W. It flows generally west for approximately 19 miles (31 km), entering a broad valley near its confluence with Mitchell Creek, after which it flows south and southwest. In Newaukum Prairie it is joined by the Middle Fork Newaukum River. Shortly below the Middle Fork confluence the North Fork joins the South Fork to form the mainstem Newaukum River.

The cities of Chehalis and Centralia divert part of the North Fork's waters for municipal use at river mile 12.5

=== South Fork ===
The South Fork Newaukum River originates at Newaukum Lake in the Cascade Range, at 46.666494°N 122.475947°W. It flows generally west. It exits the mountains and enters broad valleys and prairie lands, flowing by the community of Onalaska. The river turns north in Newaukum Prairie and joins the North Fork to form the mainstem Newaukum River.

== Wildlife and biology ==
The mainstem river and some of its forks and tributaries support both spring and fall Chinook salmon, Coho salmon, and other fish. The mainstem portion of the river is assigned as a "core summer salmonid habitat", which grants protections to migratory salmon from human activities on the river when water temperatures rise above 60.8 °F (34 °C).

== See also ==
- List of geographic features in Lewis County, Washington
- List of rivers of Washington (state)
