= Onalaska, Washington =

Census-designated place in the United States

- Census-designated place
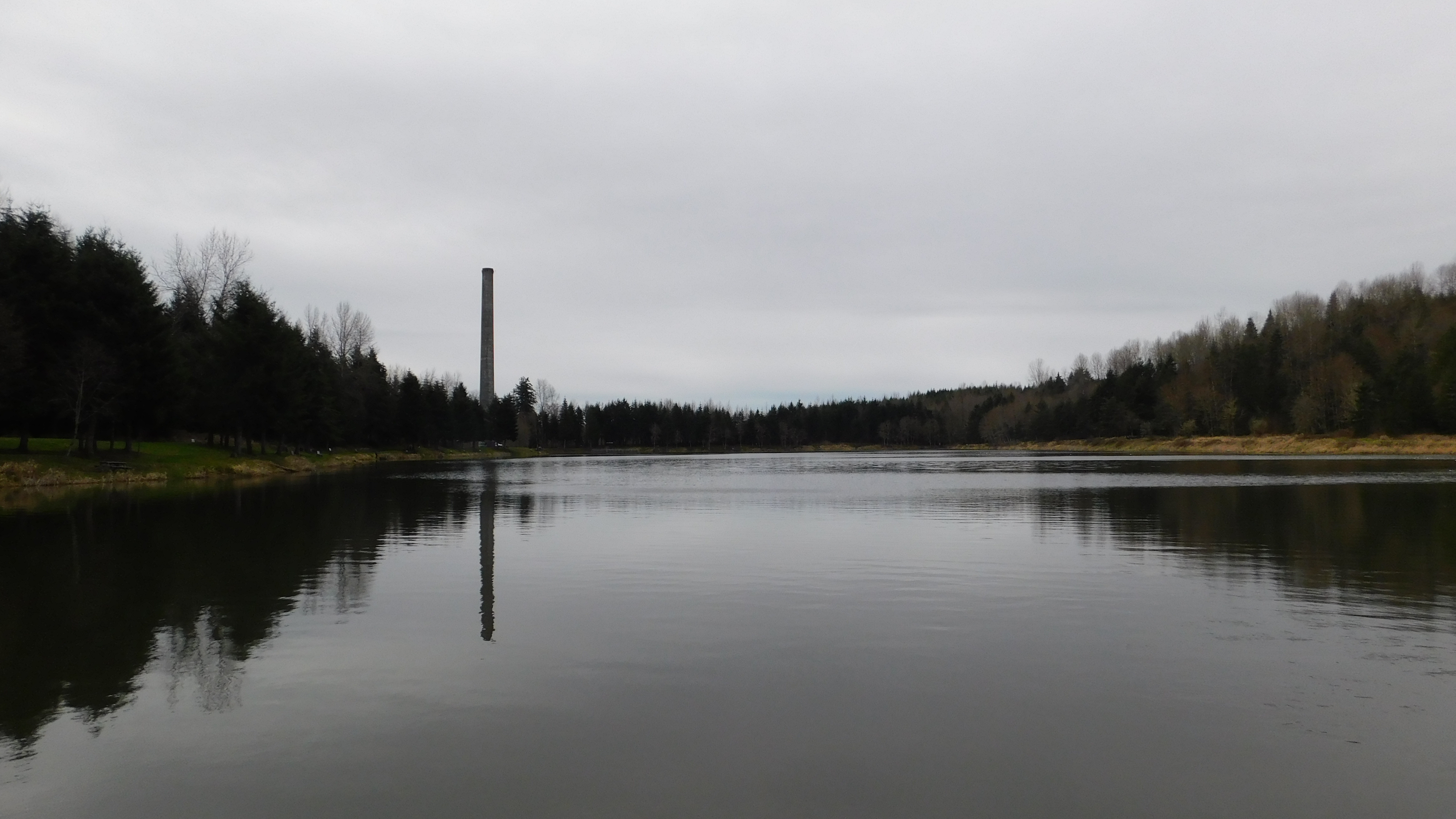
- Carlisle Lake, Onalaska, 2025

- Location within Washington (state) Location within the United States
- Coordinates: 46°34′42″N 122°42′40″W
- Country: United States
- State: Washington
- County: Lewis
- Established: 1914

Area
  - Total: 1.60 sq mi (4.15 km^{2})
  - Land: 1.60 sq mi (4.15 km^{2})
  - Water: 0 sq mi (0.0 km^{2})
- Elevation: 502 ft (153 m)

Population (2020)
  - Total: 657
- Time zone: UTC-8 (Pacific (PST))
  - Summer (DST): UTC-7 (PDT)
- ZIP Code: 98570
- Area code(s): 360, 564
- GNIS feature ID: 2586742
- FIPS code: 53-51410

Onalaska is an unincorporated community and census-designated place (CDP) in Lewis County, Washington, United States. As of the 2020 census it had a population of 657. Onalaska is located along Washington State Route 508.

== Etymology ==
The name for the community comes from the poem "The Pleasures of Hope" by Scottish poet Thomas Campbell. The place referenced in the poem was called Oonalaska, which was shortened. This name was given to a lumber town in Arkansas. After that was a success, the next operation, in Wisconsin, was also named Onalaska. The name became a company tradition, with the towns of Onalaska, Wisconsin and Onalaska, Texas still surviving.

== History ==
Onalaska was built around the inland mill established by the Carlisle Lumber Company in 1909, with actual production commencing in 1914. At its peak in 1929, company inventory numbered over 20 million board feet of lumber, producing 300,000 board feet per day. The community's population was approximately 1,000, with 175 single-family homes and almost 50 bunkhouses of various occupancy. During the Great Depression, with issues regarding falling timber prices and production, along with increased unionization efforts, the Carlisle family closed the facility. The mill was sold for scrap during World War II.

The company's surviving 225-foot smokestack near Carlisle Lake was built between 1918 and 1920, and is the last trace of one of the most successful mid-sized sawmills in Washington state. In May 2021, the site was listed to the Washington Heritage Register by the Washington State Advisory Council on Historic Preservation.

The mill employed a significant number of Japanese and Japanese Americans. They lived north of today's State Route 508 and east of Carlisle Avenue. The streets, which ran parallel to Carlisle Avenue were called Oriental Avenue, Nippon Avenue and Tokyo Avenue. The 1940 census showed 62 people of Japanese descent living in Lewis County. Because of their experience in the mill, the local Japanese Americans were forced to relocate to Camp Tulelake in California to help with its construction, Kucera writes. The Army relied on their labor to finish the camp where they were subsequently interned for the duration of WWII. The Lewis County Historical Museum in Chehalis opened an exhibit honoring the Japanese and Japanese American internees.

In 2014, Governor Jay Inslee awarded $20,000 to Onalaska Wood Energy during his Climate Tour that year, and praised the company as “one of the leaders in biofuel technology.” By 2020, the company had left 100,000 gallons (378,541 litres) of hazardous waste and in 2021 the EPA started an emergency $0.9 million cleanup, shipping the waste by truck and railroad to Idaho and Utah.

== Geography ==
Onalaska is in west-central Lewis County, in the valley of the South Fork of the Newaukum River. State Route 508 passes through the community, leading west 9 miles (14 km) to Napavine and east 24 miles (39 km) to Morton. Chehalis, the Lewis county seat, is 14 miles (23 km) northwest of Onalaska.

According to the U.S. Census Bureau, the Onalaska CDP has an area of 1.6 square miles (4.2 km^{2}), all of it recorded as land. The South Fork of the Newaukum forms the southern edge of the community, and Carlisle Lake is on the western edge. The Newaukum River flows west to the Chehalis River at Chehalis.

== Demographics ==
Historical population
| Census | Pop. | Note | %± |
|---|---|---|---|
| 2010 | 621 | | — |
| 2020 | 657 | | 5.8% |
U.S. Decennial Census; 2000 2010

Onalaska first appeared as a census designated place in the 2010 U.S. census.

=== Racial and ethnic composition ===
Onalaska CDP, Washington – Racial and ethnic composition Note: the US Census treats Hispanic/Latino as an ethnic category. This table excludes Latinos from the racial categories and assigns them to a separate category. Hispanics/Latinos may be of any race.
| Race / Ethnicity (NH = Non-Hispanic) | Pop 2010 | Pop 2020 | % 2010 | % 2020 |
|---|---|---|---|---|
| White alone (NH) | 555 | 558 | 89.37% | 84.93% |
| Black or African American alone (NH) | 3 | 4 | 0.48% | 0.61% |
| Native American or Alaska Native alone (NH) | 18 | 7 | 2.90% | 1.07% |
| Asian alone (NH) | 0 | 1 | 0.00% | 0.15% |
| Native Hawaiian or Pacific Islander alone (NH) | 0 | 0 | 0.00% | 0.00% |
| Other race alone (NH) | 3 | 8 | 0.48% | 1.22% |
| Mixed race or Multiracial (NH) | 12 | 45 | 1.93% | 6.85% |
| Hispanic or Latino (any race) | 30 | 34 | 4.83% | 5.18% |
| Total | 621 | 657 | 100.00% | 100.00% |

== Arts and culture ==
Held for the first time in 2009, the Onalaska Apple Harvest Festival is an annual community celebration usually held in late September or early October. Notable highlights of the event include an apple pie contest, a parade, farm tours, a community-wide church service, various cuisine options, high school alumni sporting competitions, canoe and kayak races, and a "royal court" bingo tournament. Profits and donations from the festival help fund community projects in Onalaska. Organized by the Onalaska Alliance, the group also oversees a yearly Easter egg hunt in the town.

Onalaska is home to three barns listed on the Washington State Heritage Barn Register (WSHBR). Registered buildings include Myer Farm, constructed approximately in 1925, and Vietta's Farm, built c.1935. Also listed is the Frase Barn, constructed approximately between 1905 and 1906 by Julius Frase and his two sons. The 56 ft × 102 ft (17 m × 31 m) structure was repaired in the 2010s in part from a grant by the WSHBR. The roof was replaced and a collapsed portion of the barn was rebuilt; the efforts were completed in 2018.

== Parks and recreation ==
The community is home to Carlisle Lake Park. Acquired in 2012 by the non-profit group, Onalaska Alliance, the park has added paved trails, parking, and bathroom facilities. As of 2024, the park is under the ownership of the alliance and free to use. The lake is privately owned but visitors can access the waters and fish at the lake.

Thomas J. Kinsman Memorial Park is located in the center of Onalaska and is named after a Vietnam War Medal of Honor recipient. The park was constructed by the community and a local chapter of the American Legion and contains a monument that honors military veterans.

== Government and politics ==
Presidential Elections Results
| Year | Republican | Democratic | Third parties |
|---|---|---|---|
| 2008 | 61.9% 608 | 35.1% 345 | 3.0% 29 |
| 2012 | 60.1% 579 | 37.5% 361 | 2.4% 23 |
| 2016 | 66.8% 679 | 24.6% 250 | 8.7% 88 |
| 2020 | 70.4% 968 | 26.7% 368 | 2.3% 31 |
| 2024 | 74.6% 656 | 23.8% 209 | 1.6% 14 |

=== Government ===
Onalaska is an unincorporated community and has no mayor, city council, or other town government. The Onalaska Alliance is usually recognized as a major community leader, running the Apple Harvest Festival, maintaining Carlisle Lake, and cooperating with the school district and local businesses to better the town.

=== Politics ===
Third parties receiving votes in the 2020 election were for candidates of the Libertarian Party and Green Party, and there were 8 votes for write-in candidates. In the 2024 election, there were 3 votes cast for write-in candidates and 8 votes were tallied for Robert F. Kennedy Jr..

== Education ==
The Onalaska School District provides the community's education, including preschool programs, at Onalaska Elementary/Middle School (OEMS) and Onalaska High School. The district shifted to a four-day school week for the 2026 year in order to reduce operating costs as well as improve staff retention. Risks for "burnout" to staff and teachers was a noted driver of the revised week. The change in schedule did not reduce the work week for administrative staff, including the superintendent, or for custodial and maintenance crews. The shift increased class time due to slightly longer hours during the new school week along with the elimination of a mid-week, half-day. An optional "enrichment day" is available to high school students one Friday per month to participate in clubs or to complete assigned projects. A similar day provides for additional, individualized support for elementary and middle school pupils.

The high school provides several "workplace-style" classes, including an aquaculture program in which students, in conjunction with local Native American communities and the school, operate a fish hatchery, the only school in the state to do so as of 2017. The curriculum began as a partnership with a coal plant in the early 1990s, as a mitigation strategy on the Skookumchuck River. In 2023, the students released a combined 135,000 coho and steelhead hatchlings above a dam on Carlisle Lake into Gheer Creek. Students can also take a natural resource class, which provides training in brush and field work. There are courses for wood and metal working and a school club that teaches outdoor skills.

Onalaska is home to the Ed Herold Observatory, named after an amateur astronomer who raised the funds for the construction. Built by community volunteer efforts, the telescope is the second largest public telescope in the state, measuring a half-inch less than the astronomical equipment at the Goldendale Observatory. An after-school astronomy program utilizes the telescope, which itself was named after a volunteer.

The entire Onalaska High School graduating class of 2017, a total of 43 students, were accepted into a college. The 100% rate was part of a statewide initiative, the High School and Beyond Plan, that the school district implemented via a required class called "Senior Success".

=== Sports ===
The Onalaska School District has teams in football, basketball, track, and volleyball, among other sports. Teams representing Onalaska are usually called the Loggers. The high school football team won the Class 2B State Championship in 1986 and 2019.

== Infrastructure ==
Onalaska is near two privately owned airfields. Four miles east of Onalaska, in an area that was once the small community of Burnt Ridge, is a 2,000 foot (610 metres) runway known as the Burnt Ridge Airstrip (WN74). Directly south of the community is Nelsons Nitch Airport (WN59) that contains a 1,850 feet (563.9 m) landing strip.

== Notable people ==
- Thomas James Kinsman, recipient of the Medal of Honor
