= Heritage barn =

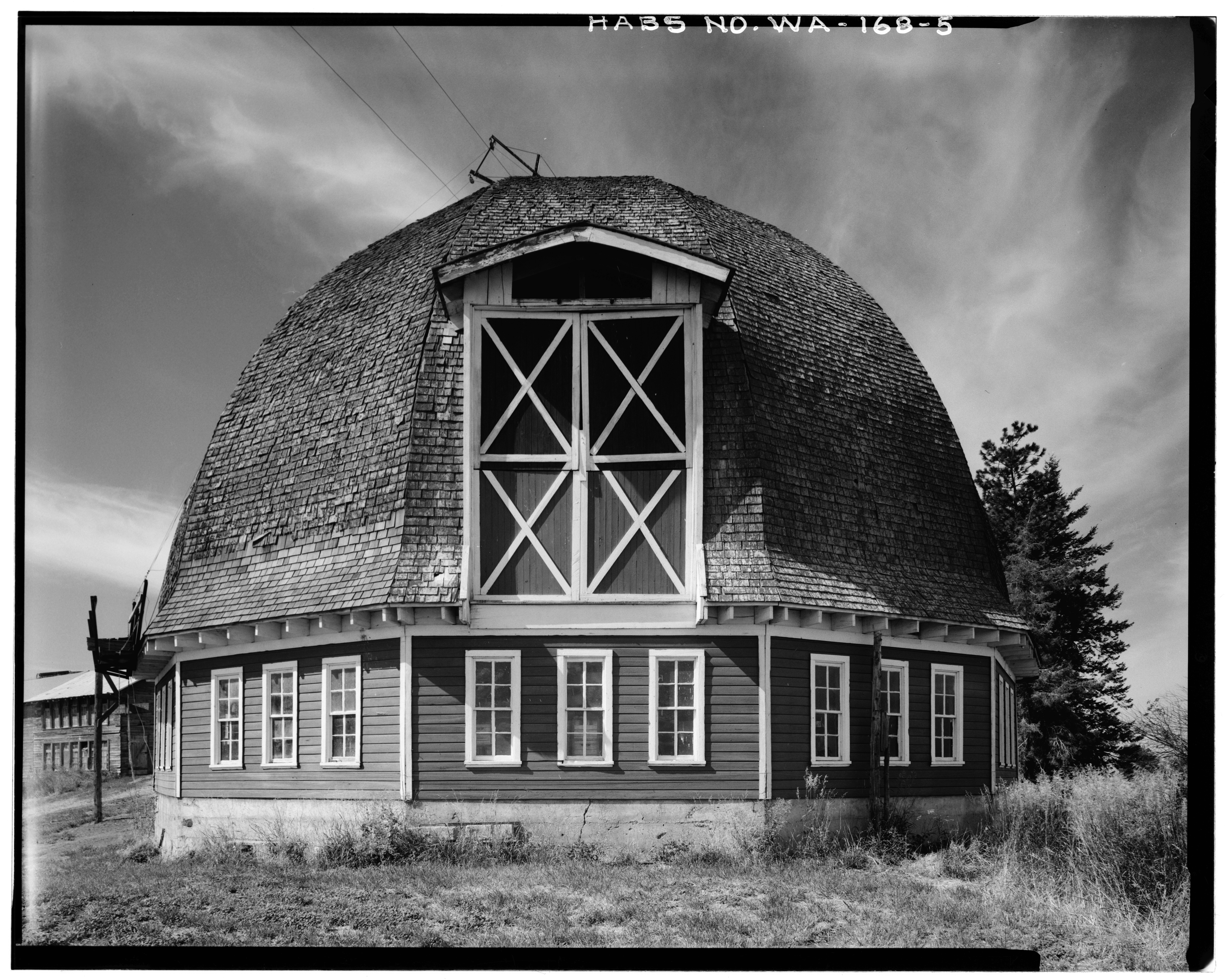
An example of a heritage barn photographed for the Historic American Buildings Survey (HABS), the T. A. Leonard Barn, Old Moscow Highway, Pullman, Whitman County, WA HABS WASH,38-PULL.V,1-5

A heritage barn or historic barn is a barn in the United States that is deemed a cultural landmark due to its unique historic character. The determination of "heritage barn" status is a generalized term that some have used to describe historic barns and historic farm properties that are listed on the National Register for Historic Places using the criteria set forth by the Secretary of the Interior. As with all Historic Preservation efforts, heritage barns are encouraged, but not required, to be working buildings.

== Definition ==
Because barns vary widely in style, size, materials, purpose and architecture, most legal definitions remain open ended. A few U.S. states have legislation defining heritage barns. One legal definition of Heritage Barns comes from Washington state. The Substitute House Bill 2115 from the 2007 Regular Legislative Session defined Heritage Barns as:

any large agricultural outbuilding used to house animals, crops, or farm equipment, that is over fifty years old and has been determined by the department to:
(a) Be eligible for listing on the Washington heritage register or the national register of historic places; or
(b) have been listed on a local historic register and approved by the advisory council.
In addition to barns, "heritage barn" includes agricultural resources such as milk houses, sheds, silos, or other outbuildings, that are historically associated with the working life of the farm or ranch, if these outbuildings are on the same property as a heritage barn.

The purpose of this bill was to establish a Heritage Barn Preservation Grant Program, administered through the Washington State Department of Archaeology and Historic Preservation.

American standards of preservation generally require that a building, structure, or object be 50 years or older before it may be considered historic; however, resources that have earned cultural significance within the last 50 years may also be eligible for listing on the National Register of Historic Places.

== Preservation Status ==
=== Registers ===
In the United States, historic barns are often part of a larger preservation effort, and each state deals with them as they do other historic properties like bridges, courthouses, and various sites of cultural significance - through their State Historic Preservation Office and various historic preservation programs at both the state and local levels. However, there are cases of concentrated preservation efforts aimed at protecting historic agricultural resources. The National Barn Alliance, a non-profit group that aims to preserve and protect America's historic barns and rural heritage, maintains a state-by-state guide that details many such efforts.

One specific example of a statewide register specifically for heritage barns is found in Washington State Heritage Barn Register through the state Department of Archaeology and Historic Preservation, created by their legislature in 2007. The Heritage Barn Register was a response to the preliminary findings of a Heritage Barn Survey conducted in 2007, which found an enormous inventory of historic barns, including many with physical needs. In 2007 alone, 292 Heritage Barns were listed on this special register.

=== Preservation Grants ===
In some states, funding is available to heritage barns through Preservation grant programs administered through State Historic Preservation Offices, including the Preserve America grants program, the Save America's Treasures grants program, as well as individual state preservation grants. Increasingly, state's provide or have provided funding specifically for heritage barns; however, funding assistance for privately owned historic barns remains primarily the responsibility of the property owner. Currently, Washington, Connecticut, Vermont, New Hampshire, Iowa, Montana, Maryland and Michigan provide grants in various forms.

Some state and local barn preservation groups, like the Iowa Barn Foundation, Kansas Barn Alliance, Michigan Barn Preservation Network, and the Preservation Trust of Vermont have distributed small grants to assist in obtaining skilled and experienced barn contractors to aid in barn preservation.

== See also ==
- Washington State Department of Archaeology and Historic Preservation
