= Washington State Department of Archaeology and Historic Preservation =

Agency of the state of Washington, US

Washington State Department of Archaeology & Historic Preservation
Department overview
- Formed: 1967
- Preceding Department: Washington State Office of Archaeology and Historic Preservation
- Jurisdiction: Washington State Government
- Headquarters: Thurston County Courthouse, 1110 Capitol Way South, Olympia, Washington
- Employees: 30 (2023)
- Annual budget: $8 million (2023)
- Department executives: Dr. Allyson Brooks, Director; Greg Griffith, Deputy Director; Dr. Rob Whitlam, State Archaeologist; Dr. Guy Tasa, State Physical Anthropologist; Michael Houser, State Architectural Historian
- Website: dahp.wa.gov

The Department of Archaeology and Historic Preservation (DAHP) is an independent government agency in Washington state which serves several functions, including regulatory functions. The agency inventories and regulates archaeological sites; houses Washington's State Historic Preservation Officer, State Archaeologist, State Architectural Historian and State Physical Anthropologist; maintains the Washington Heritage Register and Heritage Barn Register; provides expertise on environmental impacts to cultural resources; administers historic preservation grants for heritage barns and historic county courthouses; encourages historic preservation through local governments; provides technical assistance for historic rehabilitation and using historic preservation tax credits; and maintains extensive GIS databases to catalog the state's historic and prehistoric cultural resources.

DAHP reviews an impressive number of projects. In Washington's 2008 fiscal year (July 1, 2007 – June 30, 2008), DAHP reviewed 4,911 projects through the Section 106 process, 2,688 projects through the State SEPA process, and 1,336 reviews through the EO 0505 process.

== History ==
Washington's State Historic Preservation Office was first created by Washington State Bill 363 in 1967. Within a year, the State Advisory Board convened for the first time, and it was staffed by the State Parks Department. Funding for the program was not secured until 1973, and coincided with the creation of the Washington Heritage Register. In 1975, the first Washington SHPO was appointed. The office bounced around for a time, cycling between independent agency and housed within another state agency. The Washington State Department of Archaeology and Historic Preservation (DAHP) was established in 2005 as an independent state agency after being separated from the former Office of Archaeology and Historic Preservation, which had previously been part of the Department of Community, Trade and Economic Development. The change was enacted through revisions to Chapter 27.34 of the Revised Code of Washington, which outlines the state’s responsibilities for protecting archaeological resources, historic buildings, and cultural heritage sites.

DAHP was made into a state agency by the Washington State HB 1706-2005, and was codified into the Revised Code of Washington, 43.334.

DAHP was created to centralize statewide historic preservation efforts, streamline compliance with federal and state cultural resource laws, and strengthen coordination with tribal governments, local jurisdictions, and federal agencies. Since its formation, the agency has expanded its responsibilities to include managing the Washington Information System for Architectural & Archaeological Records Data (WISAARD), reviewing historic-property nominations, and overseeing both the Washington Heritage Register and the Heritage Barn Register.

== Agency Functions ==
=== State Historic Preservation Officer ===
DAHP houses Washington's State Historic Preservation Office (SHPO), a position created by the National Historic Preservation Act. The SHPO conducts reviews of the impacts to historic resources caused by construction funded by federal dollars under the authority of the National Historic Preservation Act, section 101. Governor Christine Gregoire's 2005 executive order, EO 05-05, further extended the Washington SHPO's authority to include the review of capital projects using state dollars.

Washington State designates DAHP as an agency with expertise in cultural resources under the State Environmental Policy Act (SEPA).

The current Washington State Historic Preservation Officer is Dr. Allyson Brooks.

=== Washington State Advisory Council on Historic Preservation (WSACHP) ===
DAHP staffs the Washington State Advisory Council on Historic Preservation (WSACHP), which was established by RCW 27.34.250-330. The Board meets three or four times a year and reviews applications to the Washington Heritage Register and the National Register of Historic Places . It has nine members, including a representative of local or state heritage organizations, six members of the public who are interested and experienced in issues of preservation or archaeology, a representative from the Washington archaeological community, and a representative of the Native American community. Terms are four years.

=== Archaeology Regulation ===
Through Section 106 reviews (pursuant to the National Historic Preservation Act), and Washington's SEPA, DAHP reviews construction projects using federal or state monies for impacts to archaeological resources. Washington's archaeological resources are rich as evidence of human activity stretches almost 13,000 years. Archaeology reviews are carried out by professional staff archaeologists. The current Washington State Archaeologist is Dr. Rob Whitlam.

DAHP assigns site number (Smithsonian trinomials) for archaeological sites, and maintains a database of over 27,000 archaeological sites in the state. DAHP also regulates archaeological excavation in the state, and issues permits to applicants. As archaeological records are confidential and exempt from public disclosure laws, DAHP also regulates research by archaeological consultants. To expand the ease and streamline construction planning, DAHP has created a pre-contact archaeological predictive model, which will give an overview of the likelihood of finding archaeological resources in any given area of the state.

=== Built Environment ===
The agency's built environment staff review the impacts of construction and land‑use change on historic properties and provide technical assistance on preservation standards to local governments and project planners. The agency maintains the statewide historic‑property inventory through the WISAARD (Washington Information System for Architectural & Archaeological Records Data), which houses inventory forms, survey reports, maps, photographs, and other documentation of thousands of historic buildings, structures, objects and sites across Washington. Two types of inventory forms are used: one for built‑environment resources (buildings and structures) and another for archaeological site types. DAHP keeps track of Washington's properties on the National Register of Historic Places, as well as the Washington Heritage Register and the Heritage Barn Register. The current Washington State Architectural Historian is Michael Houser.

=== Heritage Barns ===
Substitute House bill 2115-2007 established the Washington State Barn Preservation program, and charged DAHP with maintaining a Heritage Barn Register and administering grants programs for heritage barn owners. DAHP also staffs a Heritage Barn Preservation Advisory Board, which reviews applicants for heritage barn status.

=== Human Remains ===
DAHP was given statutory authority over all non-forensic human remains found in the state by HB 2624–2008. RCW 43.334.075 requires that the State Physical Anthropologist hold a PhD in archaeology or anthropology or have an MD with experience in archaeology. DAHP gained jurisdiction starting in Washington State FY09 (July 1, 2008).

The State Physical Anthropologist's primary responsibility is determining the origin and ethnicity of human remains, and repatriating these remains to the appropriate parties. The position was filled in August, 2008 by Dr. Guy Tasa.
