= 2008 United States presidential election in Washington (state) =

- November 4, 2008
- Turnout: 84.61% (of registered voters) ▲2.56%

Nominee	Barack Obama	John McCain
Party	Democratic	Republican
Home state	Illinois	Arizona
Running mate	Joe Biden	Sarah Palin
Electoral vote	11	0
Popular vote	1,750,848	1,229,216
Percentage	57.65%	40.48%

Obama
40–50%
50–60%
60–70%
70–80%
80–90%
McCain
40–50%
50–60%
60–70%
70–80%
President before election
George W. Bush
Republican
Elected President
Barack Obama
Democratic

The 2008 United States presidential election in Washington took place on November 4, 2008, and was part of the 2008 United States presidential election. Voters chose 11 representatives, or electors to the Electoral College, who voted for president and vice president.

The State of Washington was won by Democratic nominee Barack Obama by a 17.2% margin of victory. Prior to the election, all 17 news organizations considered this a state Obama would win, or otherwise considered as a safe blue state. No Republican presidential nominee had won the State of Washington since Ronald Reagan won the state in 1984. Continuing on that trend, Washington stayed in the Democratic column as Obama carried the state with nearly 58% of the vote.

As of the 2024 presidential election, this is the last election in which Skamania County, Klickitat County, and Wahkiakum County voted for the Democratic candidate. This is also the last time the Democrat carried a majority of Washington’s counties. Obama became the first ever Democrat to win the White House without carrying Ferry County, as well as the first to do so without carrying Asotin County since Woodrow Wilson in 1912.

== Primaries ==
=== Democratic primary ===
The Democratic caucuses were a series of events held by the Washington State Democratic Party to determine the delegates that the Party sent to the 2008 Democratic National Convention. Delegates were selected in a four-tier process that began with precinct caucuses, was further refined in legislative district caucuses and/or county conventions, concluded for some delegates in the congressional district caucuses, and finally concluded for the remaining delegates at the state convention.

Washington also held a Democratic primary on February 19, 2008, but the Washington State Democratic Party did not use the results of the primary to determine its delegates.

=== Delegate breakdown ===
The Washington State Democratic Party sent a total of 97 delegates to the 2008 Democratic National Convention. Of those delegates, 78 were pledged and 19 were unpledged. The 78 pledged delegates were allocated (pledged) to vote for a particular candidate at the national convention according to the results of Washington's four-step caucus process. The 19 unpledged delegates were popularly called "superdelegates" because their vote represented their personal decisions, whereas the regular delegates' votes represented the collective decision of many voters. The superdelegates were free to vote for any candidate at the national convention and were selected by the Washington State Democratic Party's officials and the pledged delegates.

The 78 pledged delegates were further divided into 51 district delegates and 27 statewide delegates. The 51 district delegates were divided among Washington's 9 congressional districts and were allocated to the presidential candidates based on the caucus results in each district. The 27 statewide delegates were divided into 17 at-large delegates and 10 party leaders and elected officials (abbreviated PLEOs). They were allocated to the presidential candidates at the state convention based on the preference of the 51 district delegates on June 13–15.

Of the 19 unpledged delegates, 17 were selected in advance and 2 were selected at the state convention. The delegates selected in advance were 7 Democratic National Committee members, the 2 Democratic U.S. senators from Washington, Maria Cantwell and Patty Murray, the 6 Democratic U.S. representatives from Washington, and the Democratic governor of Washington, Christine Gregoire.

=== Delegate selection process ===
==== Precinct caucuses ====
The precinct caucuses took place on February 9, 2008. Washington's two senators, Patty Murray and Maria Cantwell, endorsed Senator Hillary Clinton earlier in the nomination season. The week before the caucuses, Washington's governor, Christine Gregoire, endorsed Senator Barack Obama.

The caucuses were open to all voters who would be 18 years old by November 4, 2008. To vote, participants completed a form with their contact information and candidate preference. The form also asked voters to sign an oath stating: "I declare that I consider myself to be a DEMOCRAT and I will not participate in the nomination process of any other political party for the 2008 Presidential election." In some caucus groups, members split into smaller groups according to the candidate they supported. Voters supporting non-viable candidates had the option of moving into viable groups, and voters in viable groups could change their preference. Unlike other state Democratic Party caucuses, Washington does not require a 15% threshold for allocation of delegates at the precinct level. Rules state that any fractional delegates remaining are awarded to the candidate with the most votes that do not have delegates.

==== Legislative district caucuses and county conventions ====
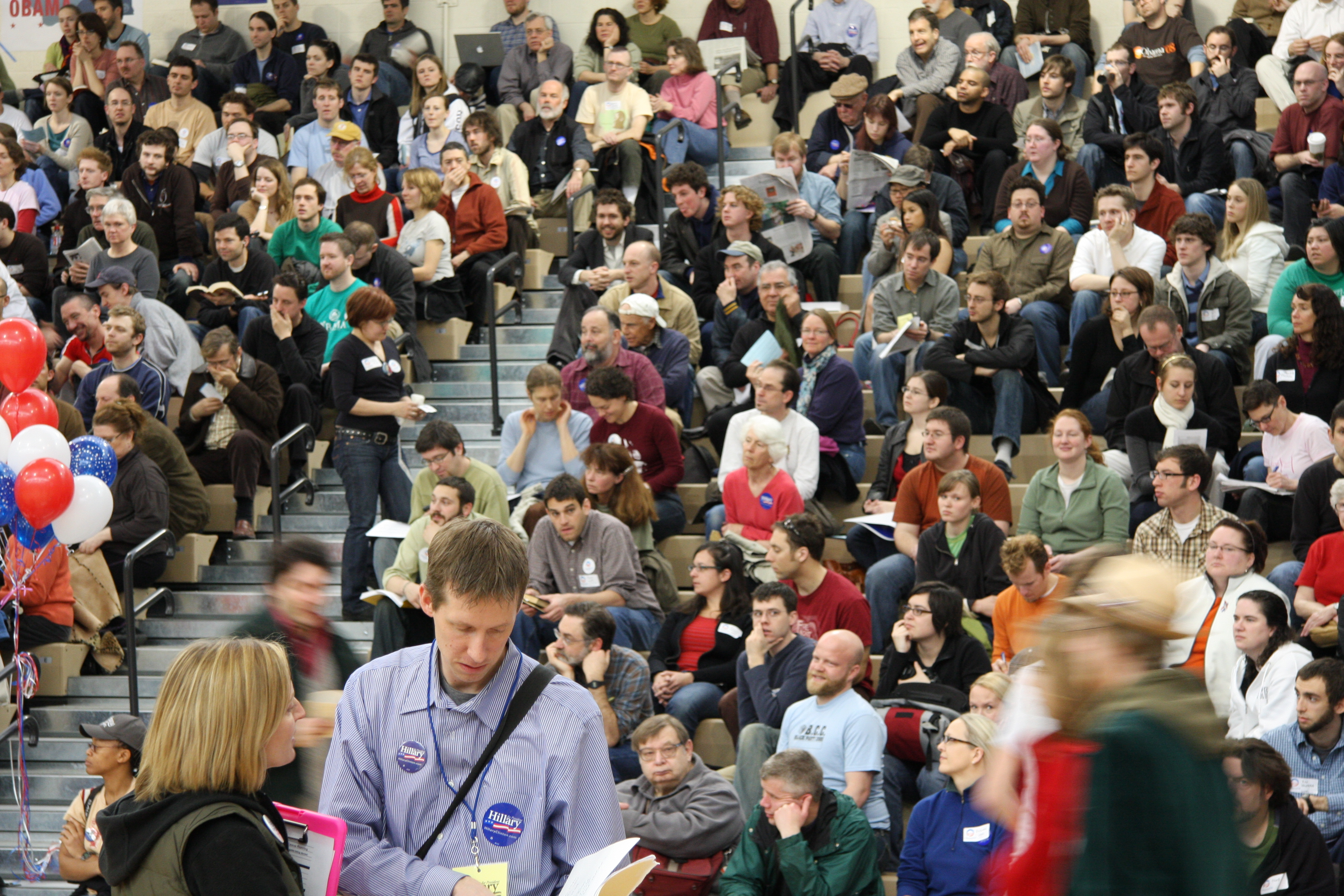
Democrats vote in the 43rd Legislative District Caucus, April 5, 2008

The second tier of the delegate selection process involved choosing 2,000 legislative district delegates (and 1,000 alternates) to send to the congressional district conventions on May 17 and the state convention on June 13–15. There are 49 legislative districts in Washington State. Each district was allocated a certain number of delegates. Delegates were elected at either legislative district caucuses or county conventions. Each of Washington's 39 counties has a local Democratic Party organization that determined the event at which delegate selection would take place. Most counties chose to select delegates at legislative district caucuses on April 5. The remaining counties selected delegates at sub-caucuses during their county conventions, most of which were held on either April 12 or April 19. The breakdown of events by date is listed below.

===== April 5 =====
Legislative district caucuses:

- 1st through 6th
- 8th
- 11th
- 12th
- 16th (Benton County portion only, held at the 8th LD caucus)
- 21st
- 25th through 34th
- 36th through 39th
- 40th (San Juan County portion only)
- 41st through 48th

County convention:

- Whatcom (40th LD)

===== April 12 =====
County conventions:

- Clallam (24th LD)
- Franklin (9th & 16th LDs)
- Grays Harbor (19th, 24th & 35th LDs)
- Kitsap (23rd & 35th LDs)
- Kittitas (13th LD)
- Pend Oreille (7th LD)
- Skagit (10th & 40th LDs)

===== April 13 =====
County convention:

- Snohomish (10th LD)

===== April 19 =====
County conventions:

- Asotin (9th LD)
- Chelan (13th LD)
- Clark (15th, 17th, 18th & 49th LDs)
- Cowlitz (18th & 19th LDs)
- Ferry (7th LD)
- Grant (13th LD)
- Island (10th LD)
- Klickitat (15th LD)
- Lewis (20th LD)
- Lincoln (7th LD)
- Mason (35th LD)
- Okanogan (7th LD)
- Pacific (19th LD)
- Skamania (15th LD)
- Spokane (7th & 9th LDs)
- Stevens (7th LD)
- Thurston (20th, 22nd & 35th LDs)
- Wahkiakum (19th LD)
- Whitman (9th LD)
- Yakima (13th, 14th & 15th LDs)

===== April 20 =====
County convention:

- Walla Walla (16th LD)

===== April 26 =====
County convention:

- Jefferson (24th LD)

===== Unknown date =====
County conventions:

- Adams (9th LD)
- Garfield (9th LD)
- Columbia (16th LD)

==== Congressional district caucuses ====
Fifty-one delegates were chosen at the nine congressional district caucuses. Each district was allotted a different number of delegates:

- CD 1: 6
- CD 2: 6
- CD 3: 5
- CD 4: 3
- CD 5: 5
- CD 6: 6
- CD 7: 9
- CD 8: 6
- CD 9: 5

==== State convention ====
Twenty-nine delegates were chosen at the state convention, twenty-seven of which were pledged to vote for a particular candidate. Seventeen of these pledged delegates were "at-large" delegates that did not represent a specific Washington congressional district, and ten were party leaders and elected officials (PLEOs).

=== Results ===
==== Precinct caucuses ====
Caucus date: February 9, 2008

National pledged delegates determined: 0 (of 78)

2008 Washington Democratic presidential precinct caucuses 96.4% of precincts reporting
Candidate	Precinct delegates	Percentage	Estimated national delegates
Barack Obama	21,768	67.56%	52
Hillary Clinton	10,038	31.15%	26
Other	50	0.16%	0
Uncommitted	364	1.13%	0
Totals	32,220	100.00%	78

==== Primary ====
The Washington State Democratic Party did not use the results of the primary to determine its delegates.

Primary date: February 19, 2008

National pledged delegates determined: 0 (of 78)

Key:	Withdrew prior to contest

2008 Washington Democratic presidential primary
Candidate	Votes	Percentage
Barack Obama	354,112	51.22%
Hillary Clinton	315,744	45.67%
John Edwards	11,892	1.72%
Dennis Kucinich	4,021	0.58%
Bill Richardson	2,040	0.30%
Joe Biden	1,883	0.27%
Mike Gravel	1,071	0.15%
Christopher Dodd	618	0.09%
Totals	691,381	100.00%

==== Legislative district caucuses and county conventions ====
Dashes indicate districts for which results are unavailable.

Caucus/Convention dates: April 5–26, 2008

National pledged delegates determined: 0 (of 78)

Washington Democratic Legislative District Caucuses and County Conventions, 2008 61% of districts reporting
Legislative District	Barack Obama	Hillary Clinton	Total State Delegates from this LD
LD1	32	12	44
LD2	26	14	40
LD3	–	–	33
LD4	–	–	38
LD5	36	12	48
LD6	29	15	44
LD7	–	–	34
LD8	–	–	33
LD9	–	–	33
LD10	–	–	43
LD11	26	10	36
LD12	–	–	31
LD13	–	–	28
LD14	–	–	27
LD15	–	–	26
LD16	–	–	28
LD17	–	–	39
LD18	–	–	44
LD19	–	–	38
LD20	25	13	38
LD21	–	–	40
LD22	36	13	49
LD23	34	11	45
LD24	28	10	47
LD25	26	15	41
LD26	28	14	42
LD27	27	12	39
LD28	–	–	34
LD29	–	–	30
LD30	–	–	35
LD31	22	16	38
LD32	36	14	50
LD33	23	12	35
LD34	38	13	51
LD35	15	8	41
LD36	52	15	67
LD37	38	9	47
LD38	23	11	34
LD39	27	12	39
LD40	36	9	47
LD41	36	13	49
LD42	33	10	43
LD43	53	14	67
LD44	30	13	43
LD45	33	12	45
LD46	45	15	60
LD47	27	11	38
LD48	30	11	41
LD49	–	–	38
Totals	950	369	2,000
Estimated national delegates	0	0	78

==== Congressional district caucuses ====
Caucus date: May 17, 2008

National pledged delegates determined: 51 (of 78)

Washington Democratic Congressional District Caucuses, 2008 0% of districts reporting
Congressional District	National Delegates Obama	National Delegates Clinton	National Delegates Total
CD1	4	2	6
CD2	4	2	6
CD3	3	2	5
CD4	2	1	3
CD5	3	2	5
CD6	4	2	6
CD7	7	2	9
CD8	4	2	6
CD9	3	2	5
Totals	34	17	51

==== State convention ====
Convention date: June 13–15, 2008

National pledged delegates determined: 27 (of 78)

2008 Washington Democratic State Convention
Candidate	At-Large and PLEO delegates	Percentage	National delegates
Barack Obama	18	66.67%	52
Hillary Clinton	9	33.33%	26
Totals	27	100.00%	78

=== Republican caucuses and primary ===
The Republican caucuses were held on Saturday February 9 and the primary on February 19, 2008, to compete 40 total delegates, of which 18 tied to the caucuses, 19 tied to the primary, and 3 unpledged RNC member delegates.

=== Candidates ===
All following candidates appeared on the ballot for voters in Washington:

- Mike Huckabee
- John McCain
- Ron Paul
- Mitt Romney (candidate suspended his campaign)

=== Caucuses ===
Voting in Washington's caucuses closed at 9:00 pm EST February 9.

The Washington Republican Party declared John McCain the winner on the night of the election, after 87% of the votes were counted. Mike Huckabee disputed the results and accused the state party of calling the election prematurely. He demanded a statewide caucus recount. However, by Tuesday, February 12, the Washington Republicans again declared McCain the winner after 96% of the votes were tallied, and never counted the rest of the votes.

96% of precincts reporting
Candidate	State delegate	Percentage	Delegates	Counties carried
John McCain	3,228	25.9%	16	11
Mike Huckabee	2,959	23.52%	8	11
Ron Paul	2,740	21.64%	5	9
Mitt Romney	1,903	15.45%	0	4
Uncommitted	1,662	13.49%	0	2
Total	12,320	100%	29	37

=== Primary ===
The primary took place on February 19, 2008.

Official results
Candidate	Votes	Percentage	Delegates
John McCain	262,304	49.50%	16
Mike Huckabee	127,657	24.09%	8
Mitt Romney*	86,140	16.25%	0
Ron Paul	40,539	7.65%	5
Rudy Giuliani*	5,145	0.97%	0
Fred Thompson*	4,865	0.92%	0
Alan Keyes	2,226	0.42%	0
Duncan Hunter*	799	0.19%	0
Total	529,932	100%	29

* Candidate stopped campaign before primary

=== Money raised ===
The following table shows the amount of money each Republican Party candidate raised in the state of Washington.

== Campaign ==
=== Predictions ===
Source	Ranking
D.C. Political Report	Likely D
Cook Political Report	Solid D
The Takeaway	Solid D
Electoral-vote.com	Solid D
Washington Post	Solid D
Politico	Solid D
RealClearPolitics	Solid D
FiveThirtyEight	Solid D
CQ Politics	Solid D
The New York Times	Solid D
CNN	Safe D
NPR	Solid D
MSNBC	Solid D
Fox News	Likely D
Associated Press	Likely D
Rasmussen Reports	Safe D

Since February 28, Obama won every pre-election poll. Since September 22, he won each poll with a double-digit margin of victory. The final 3 polls averaged Obama leading 54% to 40%.

=== Fundraising ===
McCain raised a total of $2,697,999 in the state. Obama raised $16,518,208.

=== Advertising and visits ===
Obama and his interest groups spent $312,869. McCain and his interest groups spent just $2,264. The Democratic ticket visited the state once, while the Republican ticket did not visit at all.

== Analysis ==
Washington once leaned Republican, like most of the Pacific Northwest. From 1952 to 1984, it only went Democratic twice—in 1964 and 1968. However, it has voted for the Democratic presidential nominee in every presidential election since 1988. Neither candidate seriously contested the state as it was viewed as a safe blue state. Like Oregon, the state is divided politically by the urban/rural divide and geographically by the Cascade Mountains. The two are related in that nearly all of the major cities lie west of the Cascades. Most of the state's population resides in Western Washington along the Pacific Coast and in highly urbanized areas like Seattle. The Seattle area, home to almost two-thirds of the state's population, is overwhelmingly Democratic. The rest of Western Washington leans Democratic as well, though the lean is not as pronounced as in the greater Seattle area. In contrast, Eastern Washington is very rural, and in many ways more similar to Idaho than Seattle. Republicans have had an edge here for many years, in part to its strong tinge of social conservatism. As a result, while Republicans typically win more counties, the overwhelming Democratic trend in the more-heavily populated western portion is enough to swing the whole state to the Democrats.

On Election Day, Obama won the state by 17.18%. Washington was called for Obama as soon as the polls in the state closed. He swept the more urban counties along the Western Seaboard, which compose the Democratic base. More than two-thirds of the state's population lives in this area; this makes it very difficult for a Republican to win the state because of this region's liberal tilt. Obama would have been assured a victory in any event due to his performance in the Seattle area. He carried King County, home to Seattle itself and its close suburbs and just over a third of the state's population, with 70.30 percent of the vote—almost three-fifths of his statewide majority. Obama also swept the two other big counties in Western Washington, Pierce (home to Tacoma) and Snohomish (home to Everett) by decisive margins. His combined majority in King, Pierce and Snohomish counties would have been more than enough to carry the state. McCain only won one county in the western part of the state, Lewis County, traditionally the most socially conservative county west of the Cascades.

On the other hand, McCain did extremely well in Eastern Washington. Neither Al Gore or John Kerry was able to take a single county in Eastern Washington; in 2008, Obama only won one small county, Whitman County, home to Washington State University in Pullman. Nevertheless, as with Oregon, McCain's margins in the eastern part of the state were far outweighed by Obama's landslides in the more populated coastal regions and cities in the western part of the state. Obama did, however, improve substantially in Eastern Washington, especially in the region's largest county, Spokane County, home to the city of Spokane.

During the same election, incumbent Democratic Governor Christine Gregoire was reelected to a second term with 53.24% of the vote over Republican Dino Rossi who took 46.76% in a rematch of their controversial race from four years earlier. At the state level, Democrats picked up one seat in the Washington House of Representatives while Republicans picked up a seat in the Washington Senate.

== Results ==
2008 United States presidential election in Washington
Party	Candidate	Votes	%	±%
Democratic	Barack Obama Joe Biden	1,750,848	57.65%	+4.83%
Republican	John McCain Sarah Palin	1,229,216	40.48%	−5.16%
Independent	Ralph Nader Matt Gonzalez	29,489	0.97%	+0.16%
Libertarian	Bob Barr Wayne Allyn Root	12,728	0.42%	−
Constitution	Chuck Baldwin Darrell Castle	9,432	0.31%	+0.17%
Green	Cynthia McKinney Rosa Clemente	3,819	0.13%	+0.03%
Socialism and Liberation	Gloria La Riva Eugene Puryear	705	0.02%	N/A
Socialist Workers	James Harris Alyson Kennedy	641	0.02%	−
Total votes		3,036,878	100.00%	N/A

=== By county ===
County	Barack Obama Democratic		John McCain Republican		Various candidates Other parties		Margin		Total
County	#	%	#	%	#	%	#	%	Total
Adams	1,552	31.95%	3,222	66.32%	84	1.73%	-1,670	-34.38%	4,858
Asotin	4,139	42.32%	5,451	55.74%	190	1.94%	-1,312	-13.42%	9,780
Benton	26,288	36.05%	45,345	62.19%	1,278	1.75%	-19,057	-26.14%	72,911
Chelan	13,781	43.12%	17,605	55.09%	572	1.79%	-3,824	-11.97%	31,958
Clallam	19,470	50.55%	18,199	47.25%	850	2.21%	1,271	3.30%	38,519
Clark	95,356	52.17%	84,212	46.08%	3,196	1.75%	11,144	6.10%	182,764
Columbia	686	30.79%	1,499	67.28%	43	1.93%	-813	-36.49%	2,228
Cowlitz	24,597	54.38%	19,554	43.23%	1,078	2.38%	5,043	11.15%	45,229
Douglas	5,848	38.45%	9,098	59.82%	263	1.73%	-3,250	-21.37%	15,209
Ferry	1,467	41.90%	1,916	54.73%	118	3.37%	-449	-12.82%	3,501
Franklin	7,361	37.37%	12,037	61.11%	298	1.51%	-4,676	-23.74%	19,696
Garfield	385	28.04%	968	70.50%	20	1.46%	-583	-42.46%	1,373
Grant	9,601	34.99%	17,153	62.52%	684	2.49%	-7,552	-27.52%	27,438
Grays Harbor	16,354	56.04%	12,104	41.47%	726	2.49%	4,250	14.56%	29,184
Island	22,058	52.32%	19,426	46.08%	675	1.60%	2,632	6.24%	42,159
Jefferson	13,252	66.29%	6,330	31.66%	409	2.05%	6,922	34.63%	19,991
King	648,230	70.30%	259,716	28.17%	14,086	1.53%	388,514	42.14%	922,032
Kitsap	68,624	55.19%	53,297	42.86%	2,416	1.94%	15,327	12.33%	124,337
Kittitas	8,030	44.94%	9,471	53.01%	367	2.05%	-1,441	-8.06%	17,868
Klickitat	4,965	48.85%	4,944	48.64%	255	2.51%	21	0.21%	10,164
Lewis	13,624	39.26%	20,278	58.43%	803	2.31%	-6,654	-19.17%	34,705
Lincoln	2,032	34.00%	3,803	63.63%	142	2.38%	-1,771	-29.63%	5,977
Mason	15,050	53.17%	12,600	44.51%	656	2.32%	2,450	8.66%	28,306
Okanogan	7,613	45.13%	8,798	52.15%	459	2.72%	-1,185	-7.02%	16,870
Pacific	6,094	55.72%	4,555	41.65%	288	2.63%	1,539	14.07%	10,937
Pend Oreille	2,562	39.10%	3,717	56.73%	273	4.17%	-1,155	-17.63%	6,552
Pierce	181,824	55.18%	141,673	42.99%	6,023	1.83%	40,151	12.18%	329,520
San Juan	7,374	70.02%	2,958	28.09%	199	1.89%	4,416	41.93%	10,531
Skagit	30,053	53.78%	24,687	44.17%	1,146	2.05%	5,366	9.60%	55,886
Skamania	2,817	51.31%	2,524	45.97%	149	2.71%	293	5.34%	5,490
Snohomish	187,294	58.47%	126,722	39.56%	6,317	1.97%	60,572	18.91%	320,333
Spokane	105,786	48.19%	108,314	49.34%	5,411	2.47%	-2,528	-1.15%	219,511
Stevens	8,499	38.04%	13,132	58.78%	710	3.18%	-4,633	-20.74%	22,341
Thurston	75,882	59.89%	48,366	38.17%	2,461	1.94%	27,516	21.72%	126,709
Wahkiakum	1,121	48.87%	1,105	48.17%	68	2.96%	16	0.70%	2,294
Walla Walla	10,081	40.77%	14,182	57.35%	464	1.88%	-4,101	-16.59%	24,727
Whatcom	58,236	58.04%	40,205	40.07%	1,898	1.89%	18,031	17.97%	100,339
Whitman	9,070	51.57%	8,104	46.07%	415	2.36%	966	5.49%	17,589
Yakima	33,792	43.85%	41,946	54.43%	1,324	1.72%	-8,154	-10.58%	77,062
Totals	1,750,848	57.65%	1,229,216	40.48%	56,814	1.87%	521,632	17.18%	3,036,878

==== Counties that flipped from Republican to Democratic ====
- Clallam (largest community: Port Angeles)
- Clark (largest city: Vancouver)
- Island (largest city: Coupeville)
- Klickitat (largest community: Goldendale)
- Skagit (largest city: Mount Vernon)
- Skamania (largest community: Carson)
- Wahkhiakum (largest community: Puget Island)
- Whitman (largest city: Pullman)

=== By congressional district ===
Barack Obama carried seven of the state's nine congressional districts, including one district held by a Republican.

District	McCain	Obama	Representative
1st	35.93%	62.44%	Jay Inslee
2nd	42.00%	55.60%	Rick Larsen
3rd	45.66%	52.37%	Brian Baird
4th	57.84%	40.30%	Doc Hastings
5th	51.54%	45.97%	Cathy McMorris Rodgers
6th	40.51%	57.43%	Norm Dicks
7th	14.96%	83.54%	Jim McDermott
8th	41.83%	56.62%	Dave Reichert
9th	39.47%	58.72%	Adam Smith

== Electors ==
Technically the voters of Washington cast their ballots for electors: representatives to the Electoral College. Washington is allocated 11 electors because it has 9 congressional districts and 2 senators. All candidates who appear on the ballot or qualify to receive write-in votes must submit a list of 11 electors, who pledge to vote for their candidate and their running mate. Whoever wins the majority of votes in the state is awarded all 11 electoral votes. Their chosen electors then vote for president and vice president. Although electors are pledged to their candidate and running mate, they are not obligated to vote for them. An elector who votes for someone other than their candidate is known as a faithless elector.

The electors of each state and the District of Columbia met on December 15, 2008, to cast their votes for president and vice president. The Electoral College itself never meets as one body. Instead the electors from each state and the District of Columbia met in their respective capitols.

The following were the members of the Electoral College from the state. All 11 were pledged to Barack Obama and Joe Biden:

1. Jeff Siddiqui
2. Maggie Hanson
3. Jane Buchanan-Banks
4. Pat M. Notter
5. Marcus Riccelli
6. Bradford Donovan
7. Lesley Ahmed
8. Di A. Irons
9. Calvin Edwards
10. Kristine Fallstone
11. John Daniels

== See also ==
- United States presidential elections in Washington (state)
- Presidency of Barack Obama
