= Muddy River (Washington) =

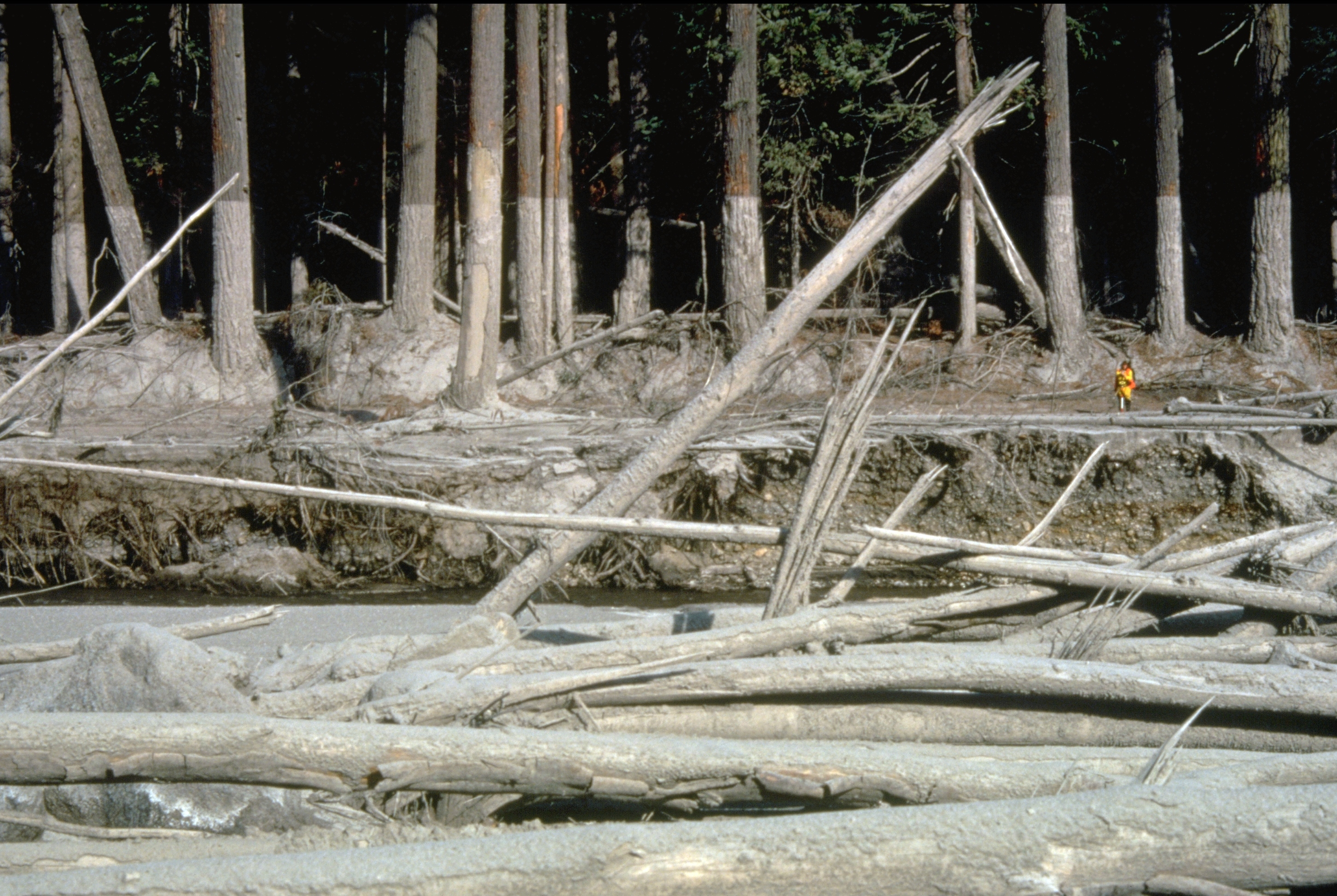
- Mudline on trees showing lahar levels from 1980 volcanic eruption

- Location of the mouth of Muddy River in Washington Muddy River (Washington) (the United States)

Location
- Country: United States
- State: Washington
- County: Skamania

Physical characteristics
- Source: southeast flank of Mount St. Helens
  - location: between East Dome and Shoestring Glacier, Gifford Pinchot National Forest
  - coordinates: 46°11′24″N 122°09′23″W
  - elevation: 5,023 ft (1,531 m)
- Mouth: Lewis River
  - location: slightly upstream of Swift Reservoir
  - coordinates: 46°04′11″N 122°00′25″W
  - elevation: 1,040 ft (320 m)
- Length: 29.8 mi (48.0 km)
- Basin size: 351 sq mi (910 km^{2})
- Discharge
  - location: 0.5 miles (0.8 km) from the mouth
  - average: 865 cu ft/s (24.5 m^{3}/s)
  - minimum: 153 cu ft/s (4.3 m^{3}/s)
  - maximum: 25,000 cu ft/s (710 m^{3}/s)

The Muddy River is a stream, about 29 miles (47 km) long, southeast of Mount St. Helens in the U.S. state of Washington. The Muddy River flows south–southeast and joins the Lewis River just above the Swift Reservoir. The Lewis River flows west and is a tributary to the Columbia River. The east flank of Mount St. Helens is within the watershed of Muddy Creek.

During the 1980 eruption of Mount St. Helens, lahars (volcanically-induced mud and debris flows) swept through its channel. About 135 miles (217 km) of stream channels around the volcano were affected by lahars.

The United States Forest Service maintains the Muddy River Picnic Site, next to the river and to Forest Road 25 in the Gifford Pinchot National Forest. Trails cross the river on its upper reaches.

== Course ==
Muddy River originates at about the 5,000-foot (1,500 m) level on the southeast side of Mount St. Helens in the Cascade Range. The river source is within Mount St. Helens National Volcanic Monument and Gifford Pinchot National Forest. Shoestring Glacier is to the right and East Dome is to the left. Flowing southeast down steep slopes, the river curves sharply to the northeast just beyond the 3,000-foot (910 m) level of the volcano. Here the river crosses Forest Road 83 and passes the Ape Canyon Trailhead and the Lava Canyon Interpretive Site, both on the left, before entering Muddy River Gorge.

Flowing northeast through the gorge, the stream plunges over three waterfalls before emerging from the narrows and curving sharply again to the southeast. Here Crane Lake is on the left, Smith Creek enters from the left, and Smith Creek Trailhead is on the right. Slightly downstream of the trailhead, the river leaves the national volcanic monument but remains in the national forest. At about the 1,700-foot (520 m) level, Clearwater Creek enters from the left. Turning south, the river descends less rapidly, passing under Forest Road 25 and then receiving Clear Creek from the left about 5 miles (8 km) from the mouth. At the road crossing, Muddy Creek Picnic Site is on the left.

Below the confluence with Clear Creek, the river meanders through Cedar Flats, leaves the national forest slightly more than a mile from the mouth, and passes a United States Geological Survey (USGS) stream gauge, on the left 0.5 miles (0.8 km) from the mouth. Muddy River enters the Lewis River about 60 miles (97 km) from the larger stream's mouth on the Columbia River.

=== Discharge ===
The USGS monitors the flow of Muddy River at a station 0.5 miles (0.8 km) upstream of the confluence with the Lewis River. The average flow of the river during 54 water years, including 1984–2011, is 865 cubic feet per second (24.5 m^{3}/s). The maximum flow recorded was 25,000 cubic feet per second (710 m^{3}/s) on February 8, 1996, and the minimum flow was 94 cubic feet per second (2.7 m^{3}/s) on December 5–7, 1929. The high flow in 1996 was associated with general flooding in the Pacific Northwest during the Willamette Valley Flood of 1996.

A flood destroyed an earlier version of the gauge in January 1974. The existing gauge began recording data in October 1983. The mudflow flood related to the eruption of Mount St. Helens in 1980 occurred outside the period of record for either gauge.

== See also ==
- Lava Canyon Falls
- List of rivers of Washington
- Tributaries of the Columbia River
