= Lava Canyon Falls =

Waterfall in Washington (state), United States

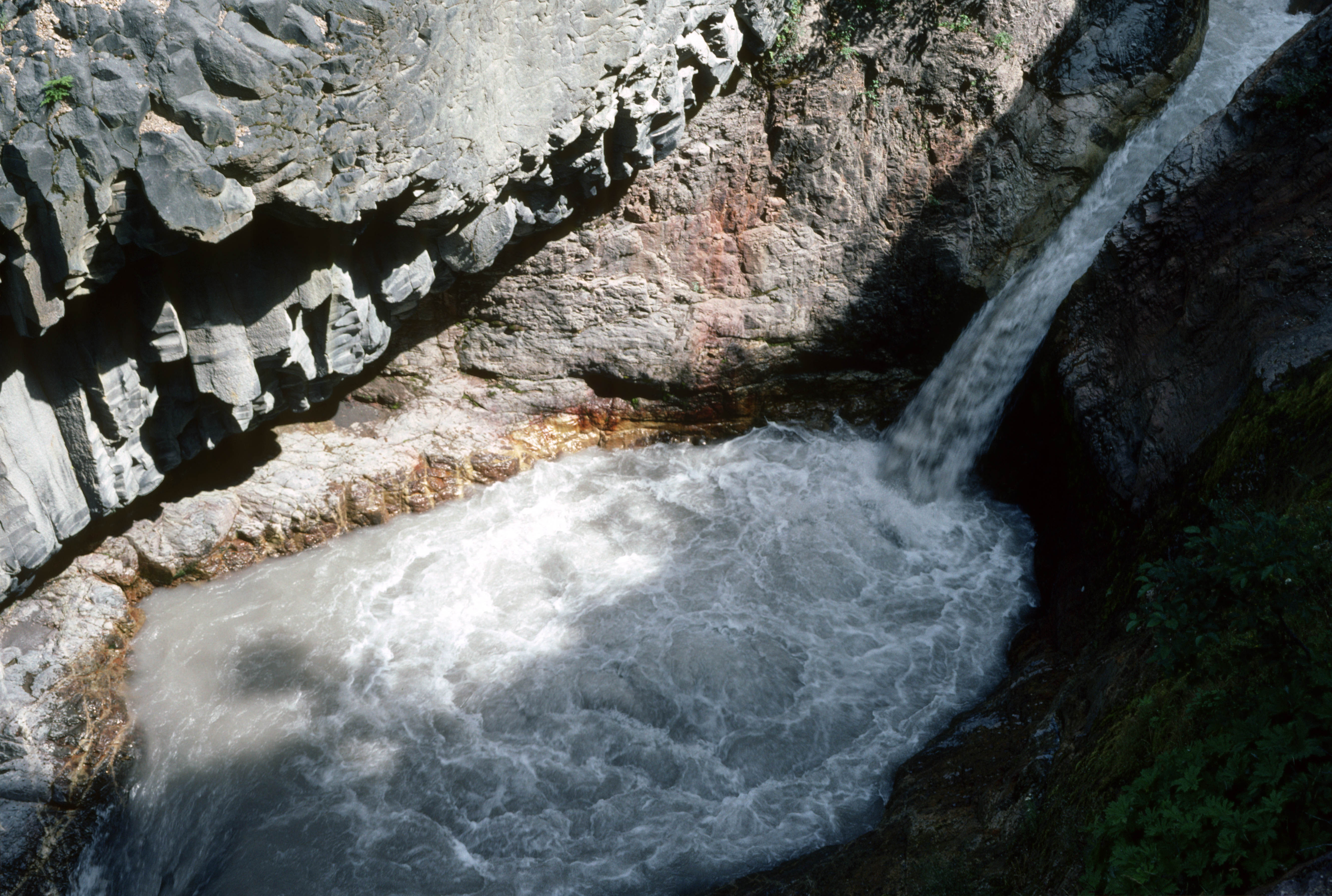
Lava Canyon Falls

Lava Canyon Falls drops 200 feet (61 meters) along the Muddy River in Skamania County, Washington.

== Formation ==
Lava Canyon Falls was discovered after the 1980 eruption of Mount St. Helens, from which a lahar and flood scoured out a canyon that had been filled with dirt and mud for 1,800 years. The Muddy River's course was redirected to that canyon as a result of the lahar and the floods, and it drops 1,400 feet (430 meters) in 2 miles (3.2 km). Lava Canyon Falls is the largest, 200-foot sheer drop.

== Location ==
On the southeast side of Mount St. Helens National Volcanic Monument at 46.1701°N 122.0826°W, at 2,440 feet.

== Sources ==
- "Northwest Waterfall Survey". Northwest Waterfall Survey. June 7, 2020.
- "Lava Canyon Falls". Archived from the original on October 11, 2008.
- "Recreational Opportunities in Gifford Pinchot National Forest". Archived from the original on December 4, 2005.
