= Windy Ridge (Mount St. Helens) =

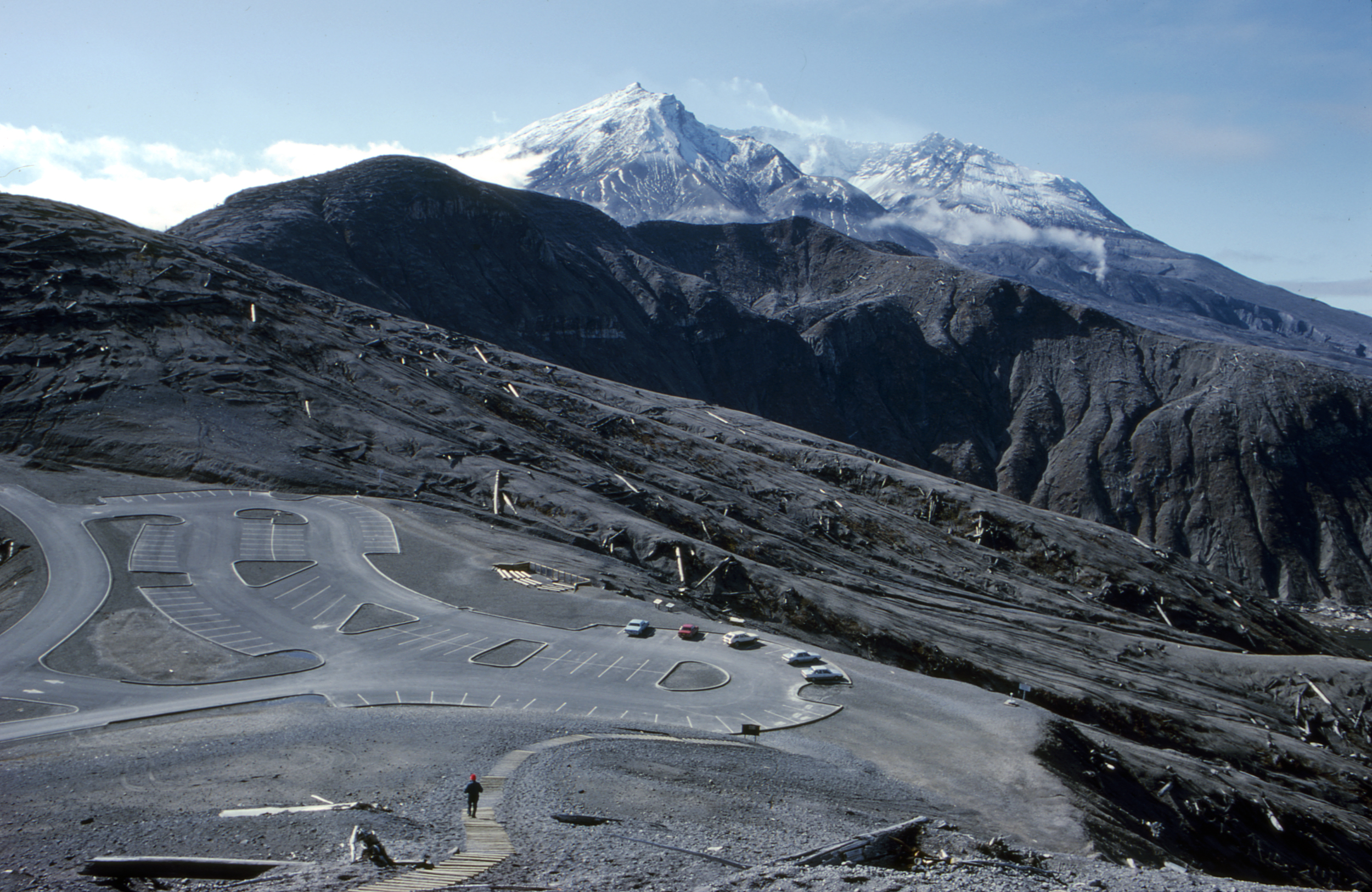
Mount St. Helens seen from the Windy Ridge Viewpoint in 1985

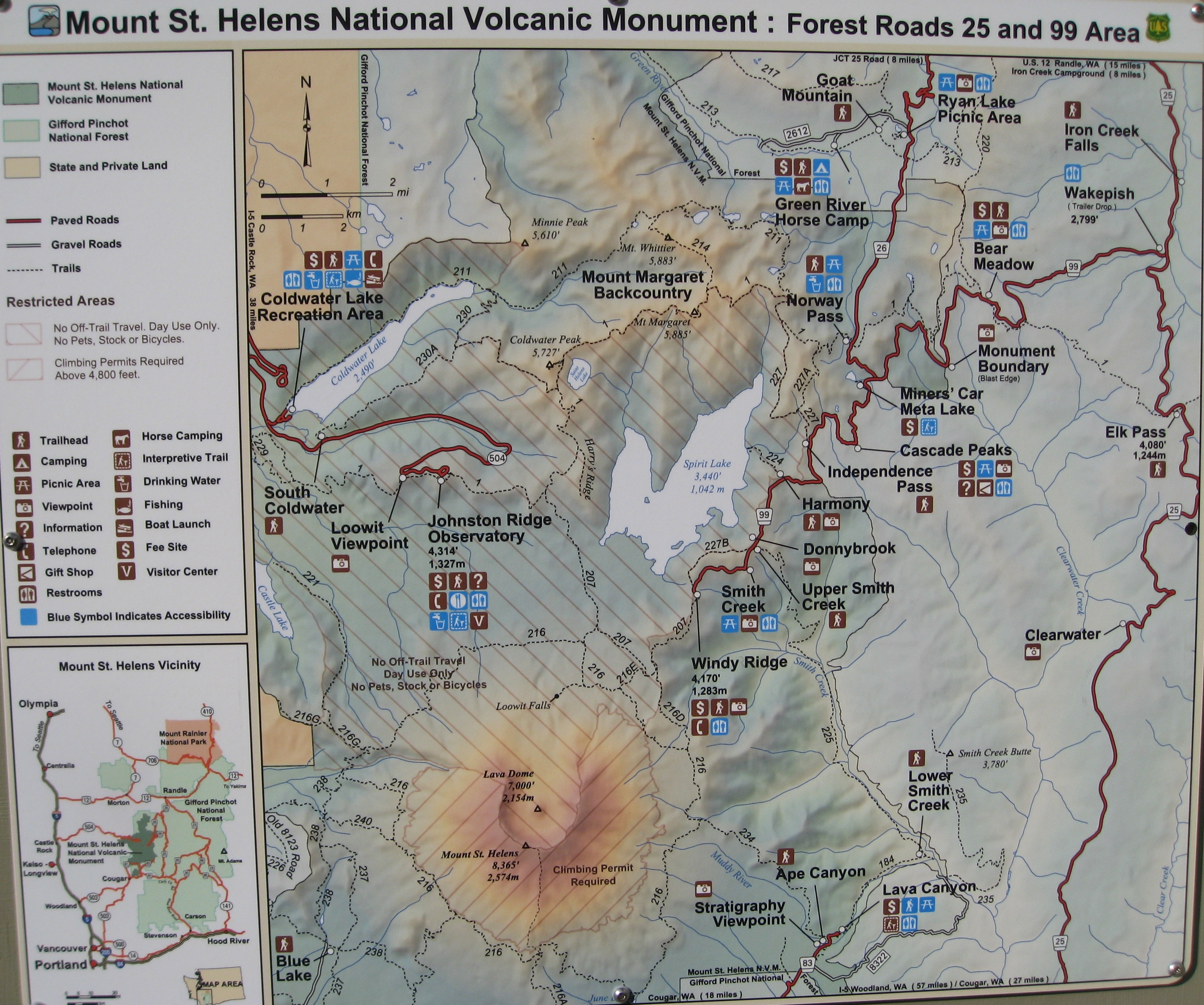
Windy Ridge is at the center of this map of Mount St. Helens National Volcanic Monument

Windy Ridge is a ridge and eponymous Forest Highway in the Mount St. Helens National Volcanic Monument. The ridge goes between Windy Pass and Independence Pass, 1 mile (1.6 km) east of Spirit Lake. Several road guides list Windy Ridge Road (NF-99) as one of the best roads in Washington State due to its good pavement, good views, and winding "sweeper" curves enjoyable to many drivers and motorcycle riders. At the end of the road at 4,200 feet (1,300 m) elevation, at 46°15′00″N 122°08′14″W above Spirit Lake, there is a viewpoint into the St. Helens crater.

NF-99 meets Forest Road 25 near Wakepish Sno-park running to Windy Ridge and other Spirit Lake overlooks past places such as Bear Meadow Viewpoint, Miner's Car, Meta Lake and Cascade Peaks. This is one of the most popular back-country destinations on the Forest and Monument.

== History ==
In early June 2023, access to Windy Ridge from the south was prohibited for an indeterminate time due to a landslide on Forest Service Road 25. The natural hazard coincides with the 2023 South Coldwater Slide in the prior month that prevented access to the Johnston Ridge Observatory.

In 2024, a portion of the Windy Ridge parking area is to be temporarily used as a staging area until late October of the year during a rebuild of an access road leading to Spirit Lake. The construction is part of an effort to upgrade and repair the 1985 drainage tunnel. During the overall tunnel project, several trails leading from Windy Ridge into the pumice plain or near the lake will no longer be accessible during weekdays. The closures are planned to be in place until 2027.
