= 2023 South Coldwater Slide =

Mudslide occurring in Washington, USA

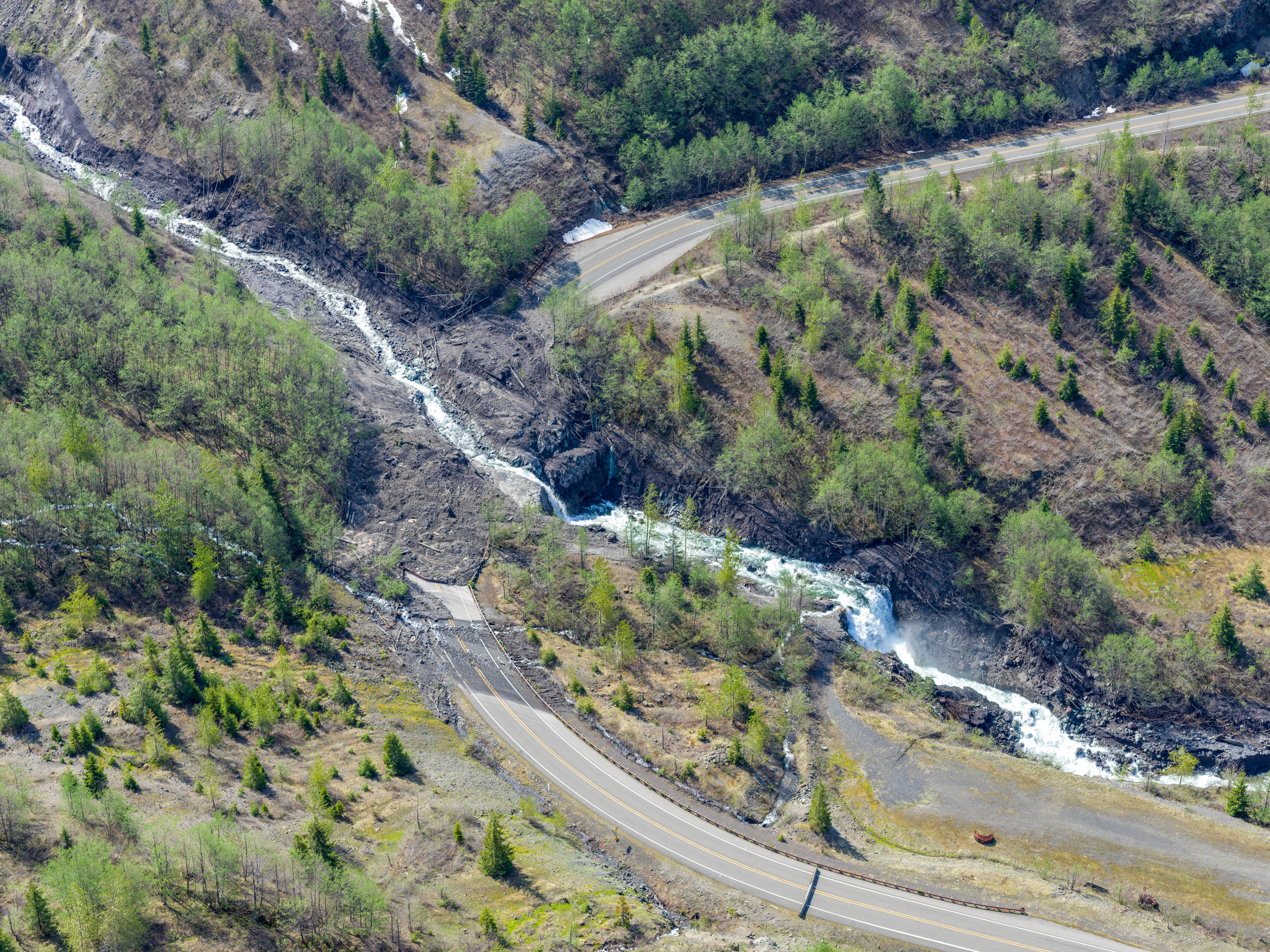
- Destruction of the Spirit Lake Outlet Bridge
- Date: May 14, 2023
- Location: Mount St. Helens National Volcanic Monument
- Cause: Soil saturation due to heavy rainfall and snowmelt
- Deaths: 0
- Injuries: 0
- Missing: 12 (temporarily stranded)

The 2023 South Coldwater Slide is a mudslide that occurred in May 2023 near Mt. St. Helens. The volume of debris, and subsequent destruction of a bridge, closed off Washington State Route 504 and access to the Mount St. Helens National Volcanic Monument.

== Cause ==
The slide, measured at 300,000 cubic yards (230,000 m^{3}), was determined not to be associated with seismic or volcanic activity, but caused by the cumulative effects of melting snow and the oversaturation of the volcanic soil in the area.

== History ==
=== Mudslide and closures ===
On May 14, 2023, a mudslide and debris flow, given the moniker "South Coldwater Slide" by the U.S. Forest Service (USFS), travelled approximately 2,000 feet (609.6 m) and destroyed the 85-foot (26 m) Spirit Lake Outlet Bridge, severing SR 504 northeast of Johnston Ridge Observatory at milepost 49. Twelve people were airlifted from the area beyond the mudslide; the observatory's seasonal reopening was postponed and the highway east of Coldwater Lake was closed to all traffic. Three days later, the closure was temporarily expanded further west to milepost 43 due to potential hazards revealed by geotechnical engineers during their investigation; access to Coldwater Lake and local trails was restored in June after the closure was moved back to milepost 49 at the site of the slide.

=== Temporary repairs ===
A team composed of USFS staff and volunteers hiked to the observatory to retrieve scientific equipment and supplies so that observation of the volcano could proceed at the Coldwater Science and Learning Center. The center was outfitted with exhibits and other facilities as a temporary alternative to the Johnston Ridge Observatory, providing the continuation of services for visitors to the area while cleanup and repairs were underway. Washington State Department of Transportation (WSDOT) contractors cleared debris over the highway by July and created a temporary gravel road to access Johnston Ridge for vehicle retrieval and to prepare for reopening in 2024. Power was restored to the observatory and monitoring equipment of the volcano was declared as back to "full functionality". Marie Gluesenkamp Perez, the U.S. Representative of the district, toured the slide in August and co-sponsored the renewal of the National Landslide Preparedness Act the following year.

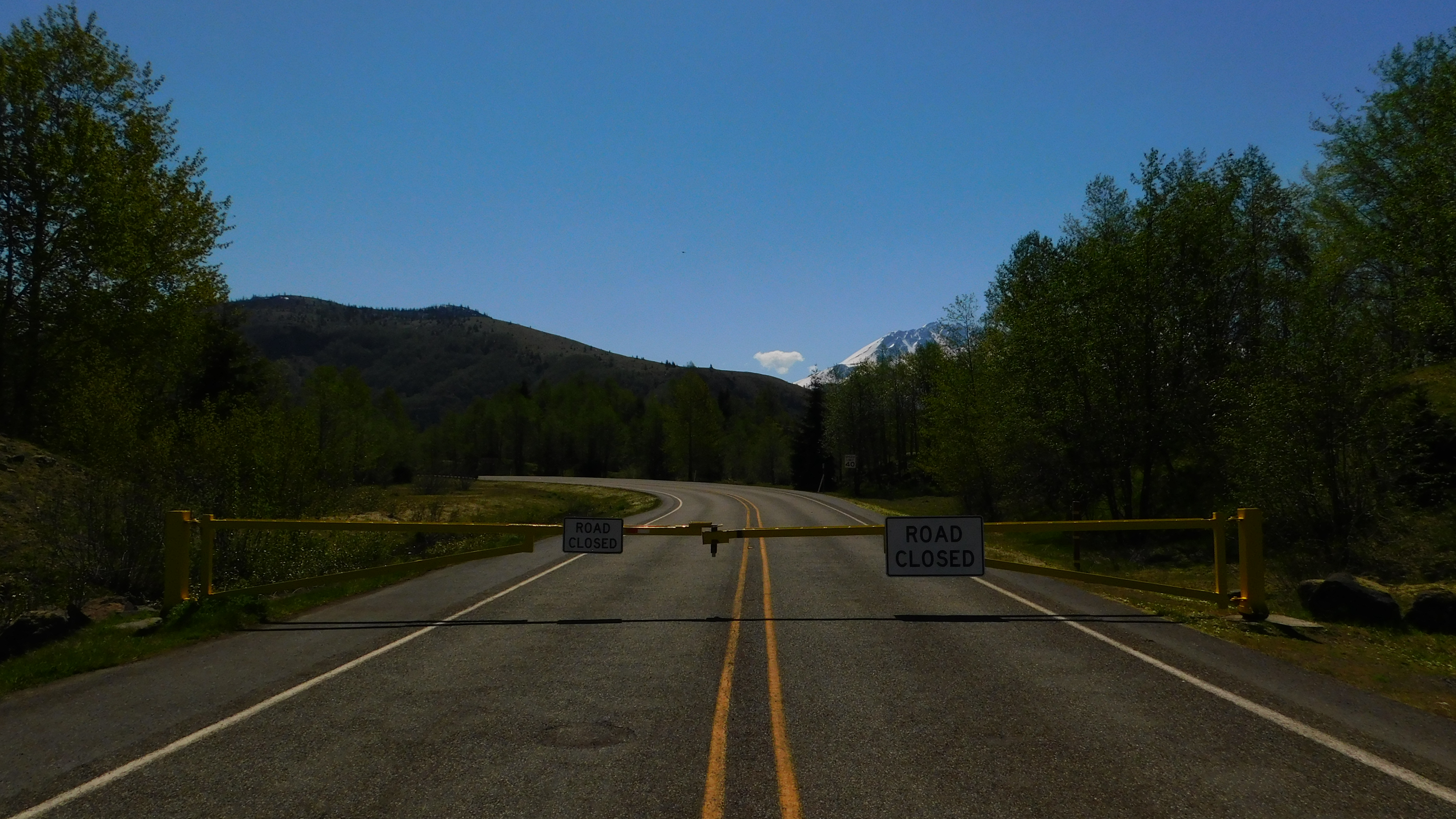
Road closure for the South Coldwater Slide, 2024

The interim roadway was washed out in November 2023 after the replacement culverts failed due to heavy rainfall and erosion which was unrelated to the prior South Coldwater Slide event. There were no changes to the admittance of previously reopened recreation areas but the timeline to fully reopen SR 504 to the observatory in 2024 was called into doubt by the USFS.

Further investigation of the site by WSDOT engineers revealed difficulties in making additional repairs to the bypass. A temporary fix was considered to be uneconomical and would further delay a permanent rebuild. Delays were also attributed to limited construction schedules based on weather, as well as the high elevation and steep slope of the area. Subsequently, the damaged temporary bypass was removed as it was considered as having the potential to cause an adverse effect to the outlet tunnel at Sprit Lake.

=== Rebuild of Spirit Lake Outlet Bridge ===
The USFS announced in May 2024 that the highway and access to the observatory was to remain closed until late 2026. After the loss of the bypass, the closure of SR 504 was listed between milepost 45.2 and 51, and the observatory remained without power.

Plans to begin construction of the bridge and the reopening of the observatory have fluctuated, beginning with early announcements that the project was not slated until April 2026. A WSDOT-revised plan on reopening of both the road and observatory was later amended to April 2027. The project's timeline was revised again by May 2025, as WSDOT announced that Spirit Lake Memorial Highway could potentially reopen in summer 2026.

Construction to rebuild the Spirit Lake Outlet Bridge was officially begun on April 27, 2026. WSDOT predicted the project would most likely be completed by the end of the year. Due to necessary repairs to the observatory after remaining unoccupied for three years, the building is planned for a 2027 opening.
