= Mount St. Helens National Volcanic Monument =

Government-protected area in the United States

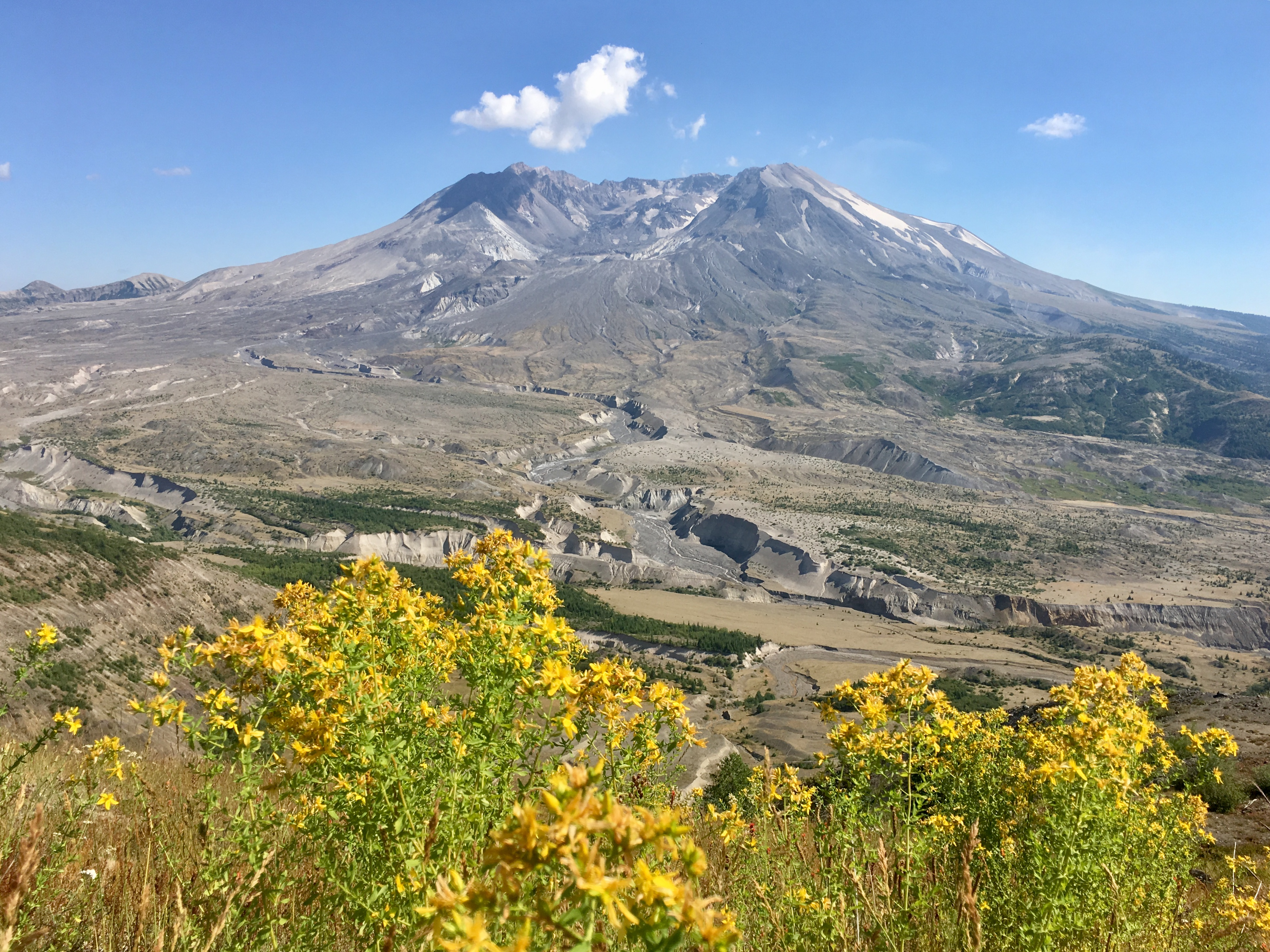
- Mount St. Helens from the Johnston Ridge Observatory (July 2018)

- Location within the United States Location within Washington (state)
- Interactive map of Mount St. Helens National Volcanic Monument
- Location: Skamania / Cowlitz / Lewis counties, Washington, United States
- Nearest city: Castle Rock, Washington
- Coordinates: 46°13′59″N 122°11′04″W
- Area: 110,000 acres (450 km^{2})
- Created: August 26, 1982; 44 years ago
- Governing body: U.S. Forest Service
- Website: Mount St. Helens National Volcanic Monument

U.S. National Monument

Mount St. Helens National Volcanic Monument is a U.S. National Monument that includes the area around Mount St. Helens in Cowlitz, Lewis, and Skamania Counties, Washington. (Note: About 70% of the national monument, including Mount St. Helens itself, is in Skamania County. Cowlitz county holds about 25% of the monument and Lewis County holds the remaining 5%.) It was established by Congress on August 27, 1982, following the 1980 eruption. The 110,000-acre (172 sq mi; 445 km^{2}) National Volcanic Monument was set aside for research, recreation, and education. Inside the monument, the environment is left to respond naturally to the disturbance. It was the third national monument to be managed by the U.S. Forest Service and is part of the Gifford Pinchot National Forest.

At dedication ceremonies on May 18, 1983, Max Peterson, head of the USFS, said, "we can take pride in having preserved the unique episode of natural history for future generations." Since then, many trails, viewpoints, information stations, campgrounds, and picnic areas have been established to accommodate the increasing number of visitors each year. Due to the eruption, the state recognizes the month of May as "Volcano Awareness Month" and events are held at Mount St. Helens, or within the region, to discuss the eruption, safety concerns, and to commemorate lives lost during the natural disaster.

By 1983, Windy Ridge was opened to visitors. Since 1986, mountain climbing has been permitted to the summit from the south side.

== Mount St. Helens Visitor Center at Silver Lake ==
The Mount St. Helens Visitor Center at Silver Lake, about 30 miles (48 km) west of Mount St. Helens and five miles (8 km) east of Interstate 5 (outside the monument), opened in 1987 by then-Vice President George H. W. Bush. The center was formerly operated by the U.S. Forest Service and has been operated by Washington State Parks since October 2007.

Exhibits include the area's culture and history, and the natural history and geology of the volcano and the eruption, including the recovery of the area's vegetation and animal life. The Center includes a theater, a gift shop and outdoor trails. By the end of 1989, the center had hosted more than 1.5 million visitors and in 2007, approximately 300,000 guests were recorded.

The 16,000 square feet (1,500 m^{2}) space underwent its first upgrade in 2024, which included artworks and exhibits expanding on the history and connection of the Cowlitz Indian Tribe to the mountain and surrounding lands. Additional features included numerous science displays regarding earthquakes and volcanoes along with historical artifacts related to the 1980 eruption. The renovation was completed and the center reopened in May 2025.

== Johnston Ridge Observatory ==
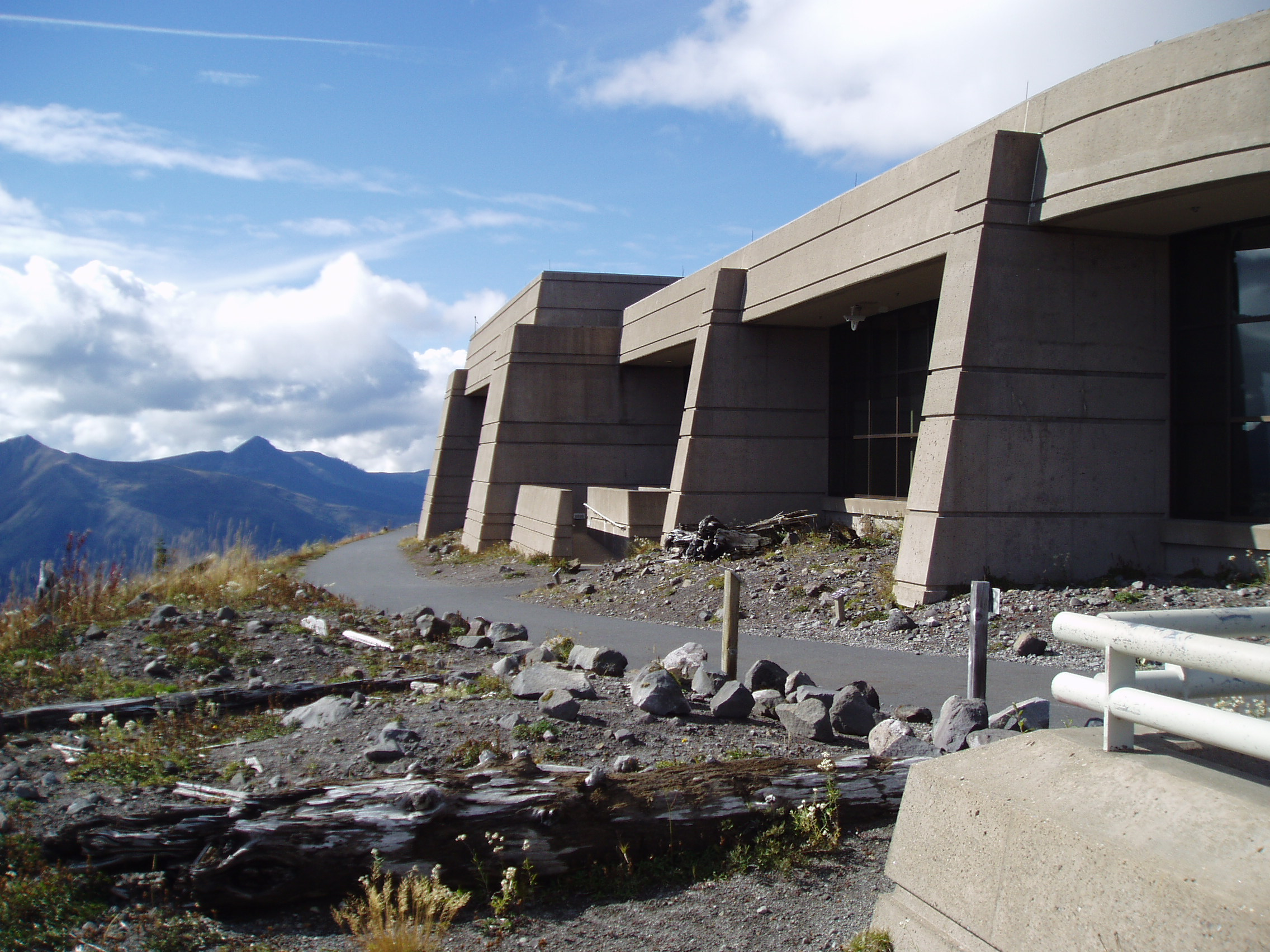
Johnston Ridge Observatory

The Johnston Ridge Observatory is 52 miles (84 km) east of Castle Rock, Washington, at the end of Washington State Route 504, four miles from the mountain. Open daily mid-May through October, exhibits focus on the geologic history of the volcano, eyewitness accounts of the explosion, and the science of monitoring volcanic activity. Two movies and ranger-led programs are available every hour. A half-mile paved trail provides views of the lava dome, crater, pumice plain, and landslide deposit, with access to hiking trails in the restricted area.

The observatory is located near the site of volcanologist David A. Johnston's camp on the morning of May 18, 1980, and was opened in 1997.

On May 14, 2023, access to the observatory was barred due to the 2023 South Coldwater Slide, a landslide that destroyed the Spirit Lake Outlet Bridge on Washington State Route 504. A team composed of U.S. Forest Service staff and volunteers hiked to the building to retrieve scientific items and supplies so that work to observe the volcano, as well as the continuation of services for visitors, could proceed at the Coldwater Science and Learning Center. Another landslide a month later affected access to Windy Ridge. (Note: The 2023 landslide affecting Windy Ridge access closed Forest Road 25. The byway, rebuilt and stabilized, was reopened in September 2025.) In early 2024, Washington State Department of Transportation (WSDOT) announced that because of cost and a limited construction schedule for repairs due to a combination of weather, elevation, and issues with the terrain, the highway and access to the observatory would be closed until 2026. The USFS and the United States Geological Survey (USGS) disclosed that the site is without electricity and that the observatory may not open until spring 2027.

Construction to rebuild the Spirit Lake Outlet Bridge was officially announced to begin in April 2026. WSDOT predicted the project would most likely be completed by the end of the year. Due to necessary repairs to the observatory after remaining unoccupied for three years, the building is planned for a 2027 opening.

== Science and Learning Center at Coldwater ==
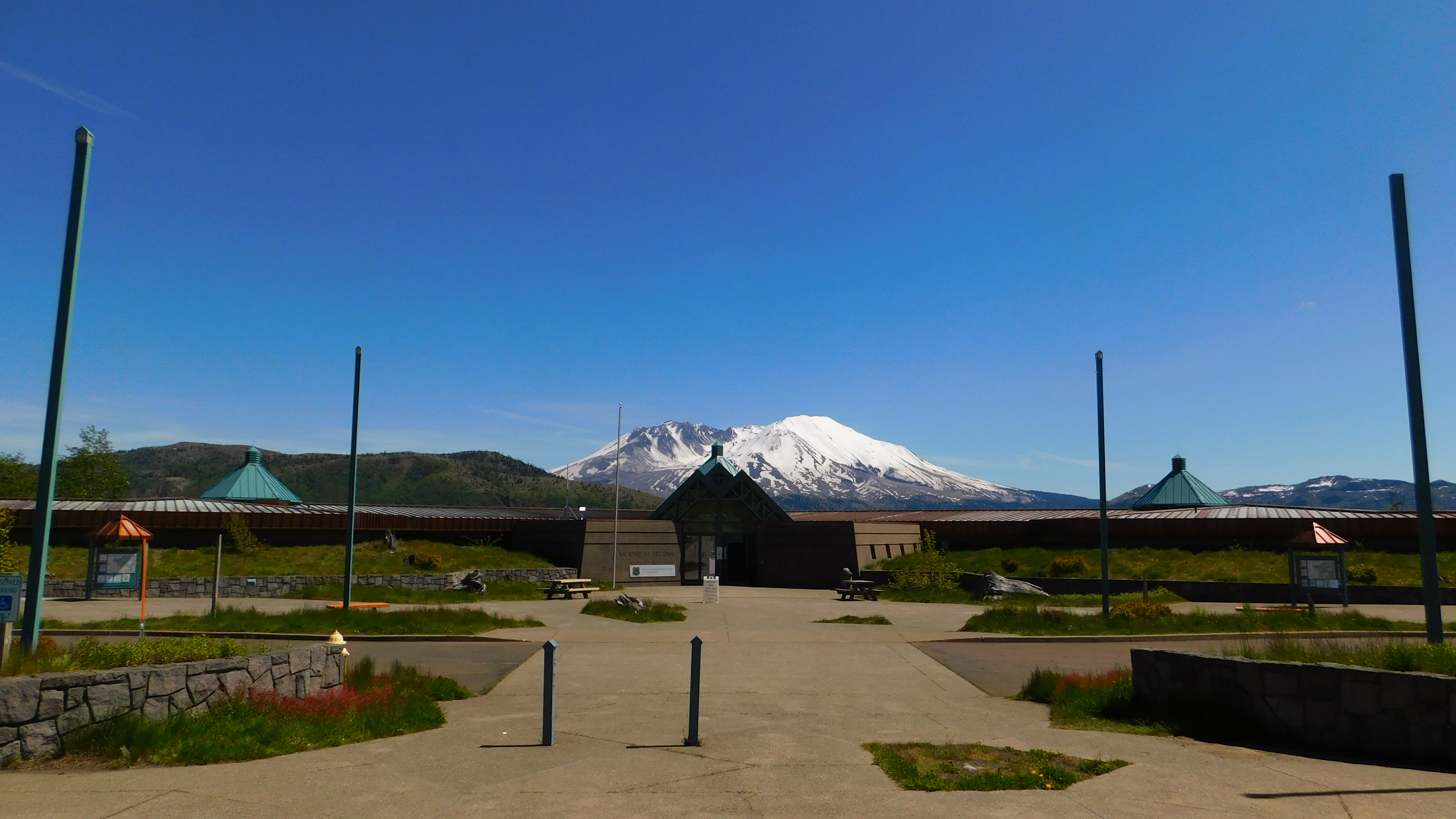
Science and Learning Center at Coldwater, 2024

The Coldwater Ridge Visitor Center in the Coldwater Lake area opened in 1993, operated by the Forest Service, but closed in November 2007 due to a lack of funding. The grounds were reopened in 2011 for limited use, providing educational programs and events to the public.

The center reopened as the Science and Learning Center at Coldwater (SLC) in May 2013, operating as an educational facility and conference center in cooperation with the nonprofit Mount St. Helens Institute. It was open to the public on weekends from 10am to 6pm, though many of the exhibits were removed, the gift shop, theatre, and some signage remained. The campus was closed during the COVID-19 pandemic, though it was available for educational residential visits, and reopened to weekend visits in 2022 and normal visitation in 2023.

A proposed expansion of the SLC would include space for an amphitheater, overnight camping, an outdoor school, improved hiking trails, and timber lodges. Starting from a 30-year permit from the U.S. Forest service, the upgrades are projected to cost $35 million. As of 2023, the beginning phases of the project has raised 20% of its projected $10 million, including a $900,000 donation from a foundation run by the Cowlitz Indian Tribe. The expansion was declared on hold after federal spending cuts in 2025.

After the South Coldwater Slide in 2023, the center was outfitted with exhibits and other facilities as a temporary alternative to the Johnston Ridge Observatory while cleanup and repairs were underway. By 2024, students participating in educational adventures held at the SLC could camp overnight in the building. In 2024, the Mt. St. Helens Institute reported over 54,000 visitors to the SLC with over 2,200 students participating in the institute's youth education programs. A fellow community program led to 69 members becoming certified volcano naturalists the same year.

The Winds of Change Trail #232, a short, barrier-free interpretive trail, departs from the Science and Learning Center.

== South and east sides of Mount St. Helens ==
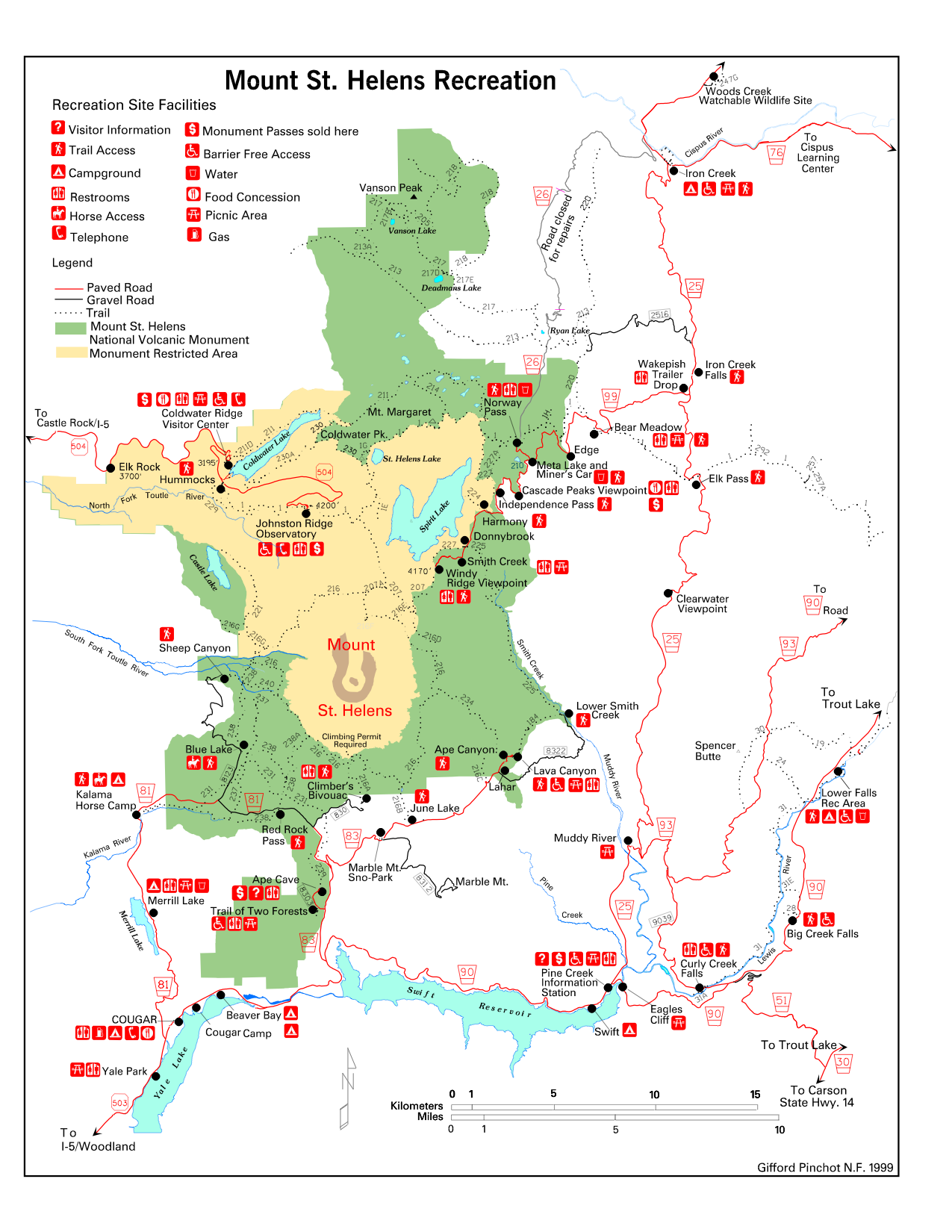
Map of the site

The southern and eastern sides of Mount St. Helens are accessible only by U.S. Forest Service roads. The main roads are:

- U.S. Forest Service Road 25 – Monument entrance from U.S. Route 12 to Road 90.
- U.S. Forest Service Road 26 – Road 99 to Norway Pass to Road 25.
- U.S. Forest Service Road 81 – SR 503/Road 90 to Merrill Lake, Kalama Horse Camp, and Climber's Bivouac.
- U.S. Forest Service Road 83 – Road 90 to Ape Cave, Ape Canyon, Lava Canyon lahar, and Smith Creek.
- U.S. Forest Service Road 90 – Monument entrance from State Route 503.
- U.S. Forest Service Road 99 – Road 25 to Bear Meadows, Meta Lake and Miner's Car, and Windy Ridge.

=== Bear Meadows ===
Bear Meadows is an alpine meadow and viewpoint northeast of Mt. St. Helens. It is located on U.S. Forest Service Road 99. Gary Rosenquist camped here with friends on May 17–18, 1980. He started taking his famous eruption photographs from this location. The sequence of eruption photos provide a time-lapse view of the developing eruption. As the lateral blast developed, he and his friends abandoned their campsite fearing for their lives. He continued taking photos as they escaped in a car. The eruption's lateral blast narrowly missed the site as it was deflected by a ridge just west of the meadow. In an interview with KIRO-TV in 1990, a friend called that ridge "the line of death."

=== Windy Ridge ===
Windy Ridge is the closest view point accessible to the general public. Beginning in summer 1983, visitors have been able to drive to Windy Ridge, on U.S. Forest Service Road 99, only 4 miles (6.4 km) northeast of the crater. From this vantage point overlooking Spirit Lake, people see not only the evidence of a volcano's destruction, but also the remarkable, gradual (but faster than originally predicted) recovery of the land as revegetation proceeds and wildlife returns.

=== Ape Cave ===
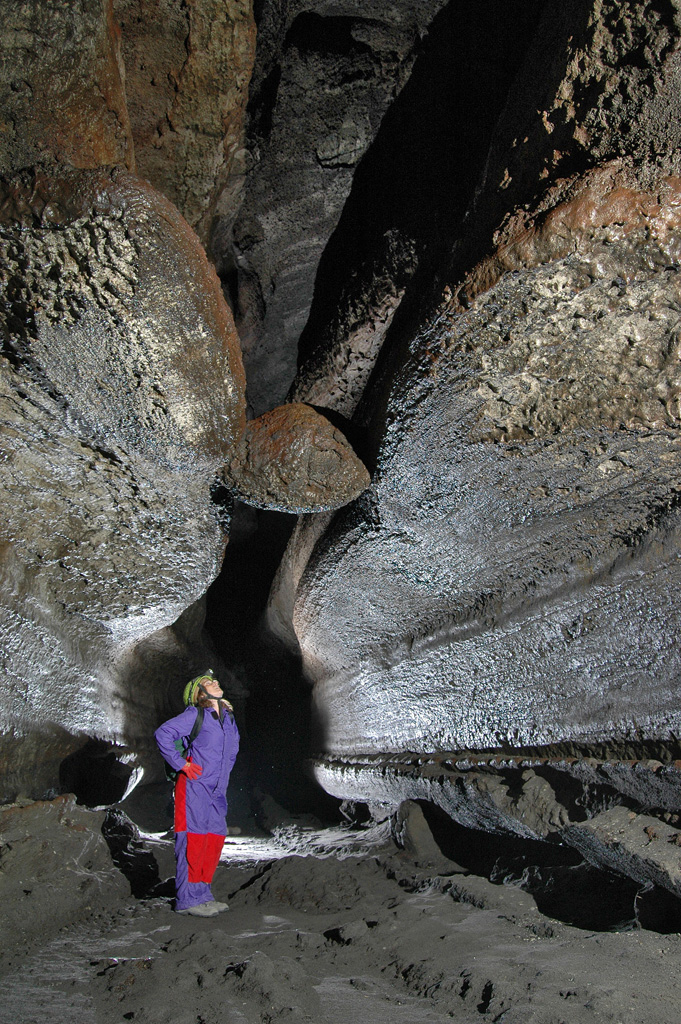
The "Meatball", a lava ball wedged in a ceiling channel. Lava balls form around smaller rocks that roll along in lava flows.

Ape Cave is a lava tube located in Gifford Pinchot National Forest just to the south of Mount St. Helens. Its passageway is the longest continuous lava tube in the continental United States and the third longest (in total mapped length) lava tube in North America at 2.5 miles (4,023 meters). The cave was formed approximately 1,900 years ago, is situated at an average depth of 50 feet (15 m) below ground, and the air temperature remains a constant 42 °F (6 °C) throughout the year.

Lava tubes are an unusual formation in this region, as volcanoes of the Cascade Range are mostly stratovolcanos and do not typically erupt with pahoehoe (fluid basalt).

Two competing mentions of its discovery exist. The cave was discovered in 1947 by a logger who almost fell into the system while operating a tractor. Another account mentions a discovery around 1951 by Lawrence Johnson, also a logger, when he noticed a tree that "looked wrong." After investigating the tree, he discovered it tilted into a lava tube collapse. A few days later, Johnson brought a group of other people back to the cave, and an individual named Harry Reese was lowered to the floor and became the first known person to explore the interior. The cave system takes its moniker from a local Boy Scout troop, named the Mount St. Helens Apes, who undertook subsequent explorations of the tube after its discovery.

Ape Cave is a popular hiking destination with beautiful views of the Mount St. Helens lahar region. Ape Cave Trail No. 239, which runs along the interior of the cave, is a National Recreation Trail receiving 170,000 visitors each year.

== Trails and recreation ==
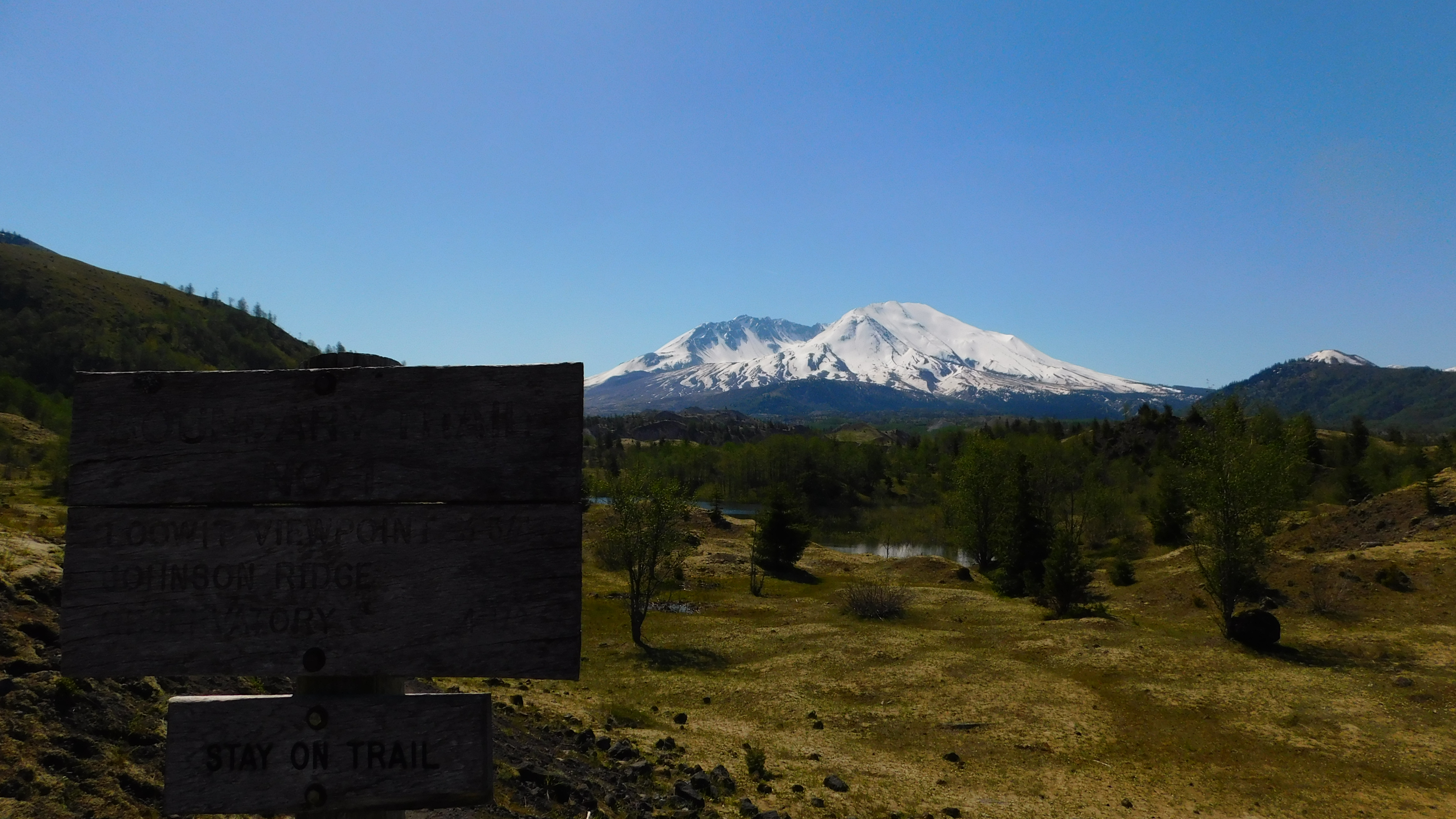
View from Hummocks and Boundary trail junction, 2024

Beginning in 1983, visitors have been able to drive to Windy Ridge, only 4 miles (6.4 km) northeast of the crater.

Mountain climbing to the summit of the volcano has been allowed from the south side of the mountain since 1986 and requires a permit (there is no access from the north side, which was destroyed in the 1980 eruption and entering into the crater is prohibited). From November to March, there is no limit on daily number of climbers and permits free of charge and self-issued at trailhead. However, from April to October, the number of permits is restricted to limit damage to nature and overcrowding. The number of available permits varies depending on the season.

In 2024, trails in the area of Spirit Lake were closed during weekdays due to a project to repair the 1985 drainage tunnel. Closure of the area for hiking is expected to last through 2027.

The Loowit Trail is a popular hiking and backpacking trail which circumnavigates the base of Mount St. Helens. The trail is 32 miles long. The trail is also used for the Volcanic 50K ultramarathon.

== See also ==
- List of national monuments of the United States
