= Shoestring Glacier =

Glacier in Washington, United States

Coordinates: 46°11′20″N 122°10′04″W

The Shoestring Glacier is a small valley glacier, stretching out from the 8,364-foot (2,549 m) peak of Mount St. Helens in Skamania county in southwest Washington in the United States. The source of the glacier was an ice and snow field on the summit of the mountain. 75% of the glacier's volume was removed through the 1980 volcanic activity of St. Helens, creating deadly lahars down the mountainside. The glacier has also created a truncated spur on the mountain.

== See also ==
- List of glaciers in the United States
- Mount St. Helens
