= Mount St. Helens =

Volcano in Washington, U.S.

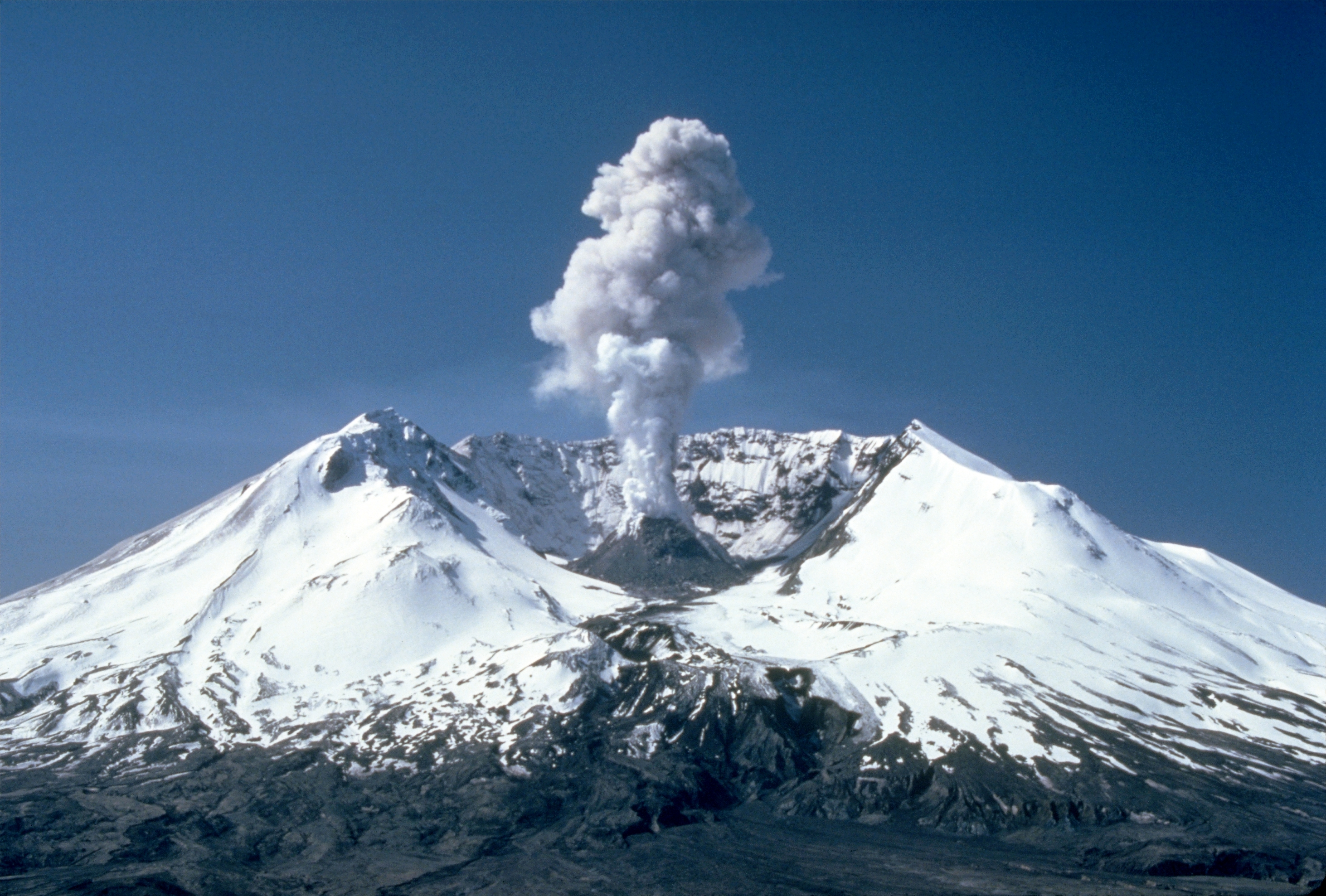
- 3,000 ft (900 m) high steam plume on May 19, 1982, two years and a day after the 1980 major eruption that created the visible gap on the north side of the mountain

Highest point
- Elevation: 8,363 ft (2,549 m)
- Prominence: 4,605 ft (1,404 m)
- Listing: Washington prominent peaks 11th; Washington isolated peaks 11th; Washington highest peaks 35th
- Coordinates: 46°11′28″N 122°11′40″W

Naming
- Etymology: Alleyne FitzHerbert, 1st Baron St Helens
- Native name: Lawetlat'la (Cowlitz); Loowit (Klickitat); Louwala-Clough (Klickitat)

Geography
- Location within Washington (state)
- Location: Location in Washington state
- Parent range: Cascade Range
- Topo map: USGS Mount St. Helens

Geology
- Formed by: Subduction zone volcanism
- Rock age: Less than 40,000 years old
- Mountain type: Stratovolcano
- Volcanic arc: Cascade Volcanic Arc
- Last eruption: 2004–2008

Climbing
- First ascent: 1853 by Thomas J. Dryer
- Easiest route: Hike via south slope of volcano (closest area near eruption site)

Mount St. Helens (known as Lawetlat'la to the local Cowlitz people, and Loowit or Louwala-Clough to the Klickitat) is an active stratovolcano located in Skamania County, Washington, in the Pacific Northwest region of the United States. It lies 52 miles (83 km) northeast of Portland, Oregon, and 98 miles (158 km) south of Seattle. Mount St. Helens takes its English name from that of the British diplomat Alleyne FitzHerbert, 1st Baron St Helens, a friend of explorer George Vancouver who surveyed the area in the late 18th century. The volcano is part of the Cascade Volcanic Arc, a segment of the Pacific Ring of Fire.

The mountain's eruption on May 18, 1980, is the most economically destructive volcanic event in U.S. history. The eruption killed 57 people and destroyed 200 homes, 47 bridges, 15 miles (24 km) of railways, and 185 miles (298 km) of highway. A massive debris avalanche, triggered by a magnitude 5.1 earthquake, caused a lateral eruption that reduced the elevation of the mountain's summit from 9,677 to 8,363 ft (2,950 to 2,549 m), leaving a 1-mile-wide (1.6 km) horseshoe-shaped crater. The debris avalanche was 0.6 cubic miles (2.5 km^{3}) in volume. The 1980 eruption disrupted terrestrial ecosystems near the volcano. By contrast, aquatic ecosystems in the area greatly benefited from the amounts of ash, allowing life to multiply rapidly. Six years after the eruption, most lakes in the area had returned to their normal state.

After its 1980 eruption, the volcano experienced continuous volcanic activity until 2008. Geologists predict that future eruptions will be more destructive, as the configuration of the lava domes requires more pressure to erupt. However, Mount St. Helens is a popular hiking spot and it is climbed year-round. In 1982, the Mount St. Helens National Volcanic Monument was established by Congress.

== Geographic setting and description ==
=== General ===
Mount St. Helens is 34 miles (55 km) west of Mount Adams, in the western part of the Cascade Range. Considered "brother and sister" mountains, the two volcanoes are approximately 50 miles (80 km) from Mount Rainier, the highest of the Cascade volcanoes. Mount Hood, the nearest major volcanic peak in Oregon, is 60 miles (100 km) southeast of Mount St. Helens.

Mount St. Helens is geologically young compared with the other major Cascade volcanoes. It formed only within the past 40,000 years, and the summit cone present before its 1980 eruption began rising about 2,200 years ago. The volcano is considered the most active in the Cascades within the Holocene epoch, which encompasses roughly the last 10,000 years.

Prior to the 1980 eruption, Mount St. Helens was the fifth-highest peak in Washington. It stood out prominently from surrounding hills because of the symmetry and extensive snow and ice cover of the pre-1980 summit cone, earning it the nickname, by some, "Fujiyama of America". Its ice cover just prior to the 1980 eruption included eleven named glaciers: Wishbone, Loowit, Leschi, Forsyth, Nelson, Ape, Shoestring, Swift, Dryer, Toutle, and Talus. Of these eleven, only the Shoestring Glacier revived somewhat post-eruption. The peak rose more than 5,000 feet (1,500 m) above its base, where the lower flanks merge with adjacent ridges. The mountain is 6 miles (9.7 km) across at its base, which is at an elevation of 4,400 feet (1,300 m) on the northeastern side and 4,000 feet (1,200 m) elsewhere. At the pre-eruption tree line, the width of the cone was 4 miles (6.4 km). A lidar survey conducted in 2009 measured the volcano's highest elevation as 2,539 m (8,330 ft), which was lower than 2,549.7 m (8,365 ft) measured in 1982. According to the USGS, this reduction in elevation was caused by erosion and the collapse of material along the crater rim.

Streams that originate on the volcano enter three main river systems: The Toutle River on the north and northwest, the Kalama River on the west, and the Lewis River on the south and east. The streams are fed by abundant rain and snow. The average annual rainfall is 140 inches (360 cm), and the snowpack on the mountain's upper slopes can reach 16 feet (4.9 m). The Lewis River is impounded by three dams for hydroelectric power generation. The southern and eastern sides of the volcano drain into an upstream impoundment, the Swift Reservoir, which is directly south of the volcano's peak.

Although Mount St. Helens is in Skamania County, Washington, access routes to the mountain run through Cowlitz County to the west, and Lewis County to the north. State Route 504, locally known as the Spirit Lake Memorial Highway, connects with Interstate 5 at Exit 49, 34 miles (55 km) to the west of the mountain. That north–south highway skirts the low-lying cities of Castle Rock, Longview and Kelso along the Cowlitz River, and passes through the Vancouver, Washington–Portland, Oregon metropolitan area less than 50 miles (80 km) to the southwest. The community nearest the volcano is Cougar, Washington, in the Lewis River valley 11 miles (18 km) south-southwest of the peak. Gifford Pinchot National Forest surrounds Mount St. Helens.

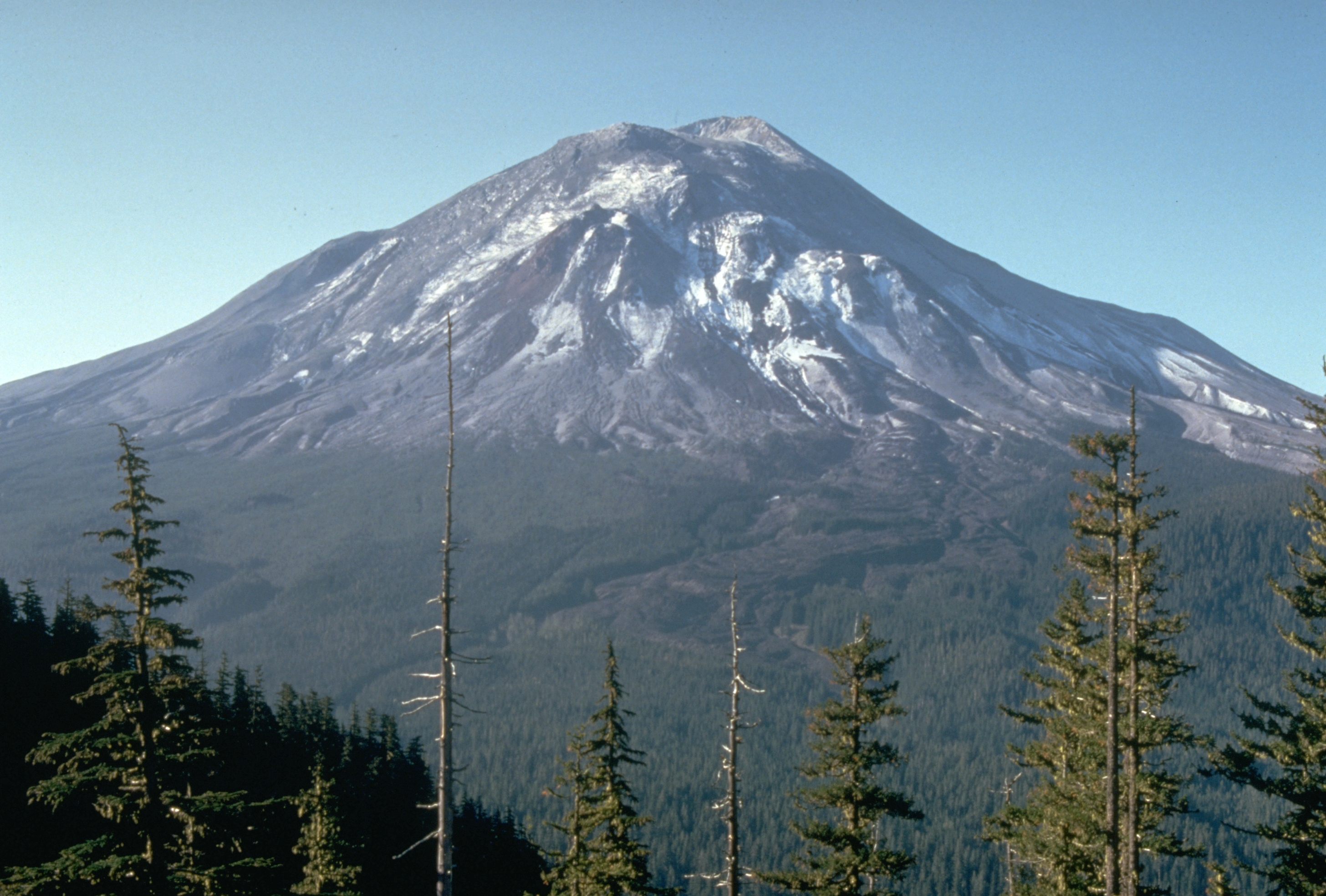
Mount St. Helens pictured the day before the 1980 eruption, which removed much of the northern face of the mountain, leaving a large crater

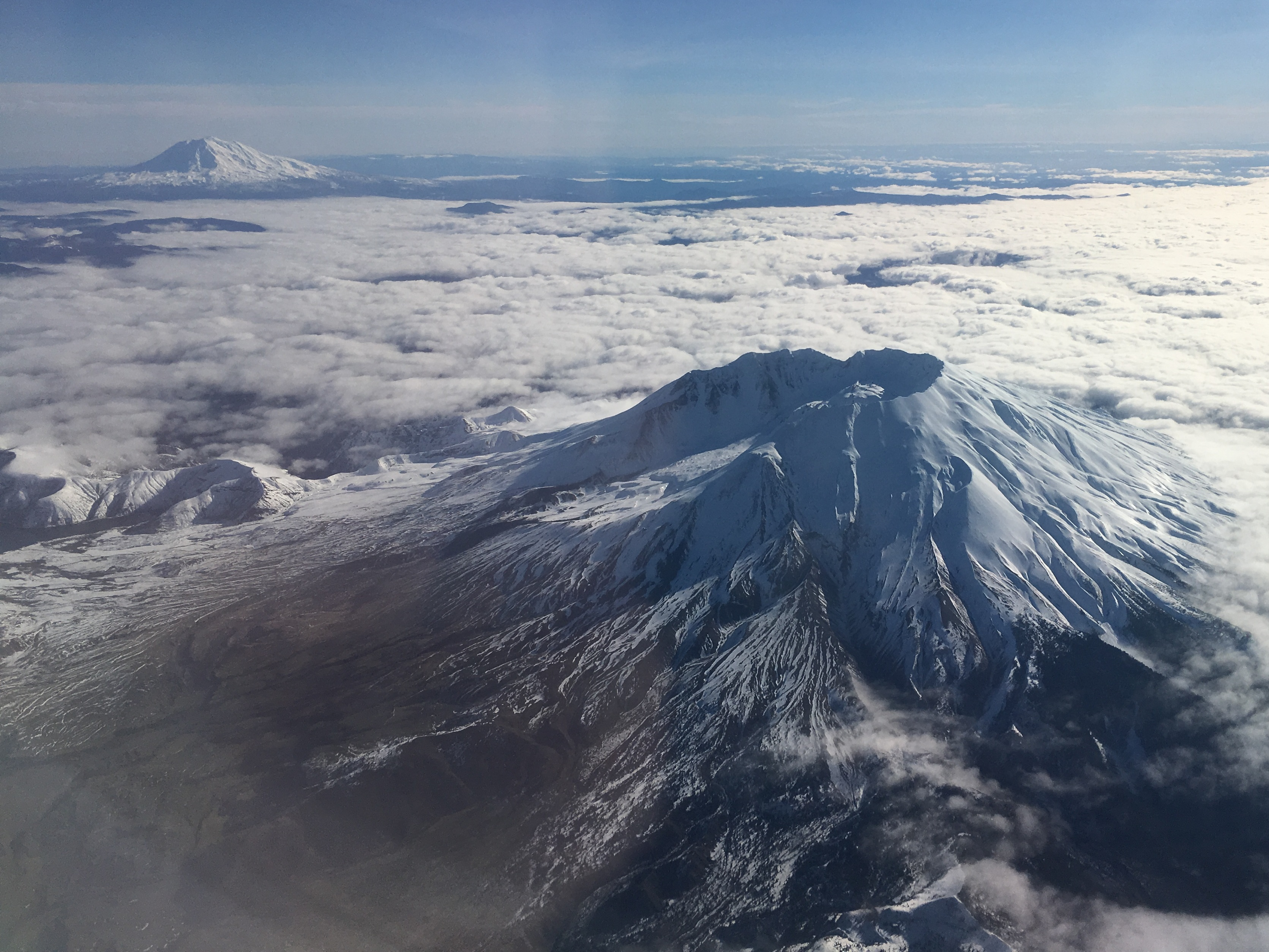
Aerial view with Mount Adams in background

=== Crater Glacier and other new rock glaciers ===
During the winter of 1980–1981, a new glacier appeared. Now officially named Crater Glacier, it was formerly known as the Tulutson Glacier. Shadowed by the crater walls and fed by heavy snowfall and repeated snow avalanches, it grew rapidly (14 feet (4.3 m) per year in thickness). By 2004, it covered about 0.36 square miles (0.93 km^{2}), and was divided by the dome into a western and eastern lobe. Typically, by late summer, the glacier looks dark from rockfall from the crater walls and ash from eruptions. As of 2006, the ice had an average thickness of 300 feet (100 m) and a maximum of 650 feet (200 m), nearly as deep as the much older and larger Carbon Glacier of Mount Rainier. The ice is all post-1980, making the glacier very young geologically. However, the volume of the new glacier is about the same as all the pre-1980 glaciers combined.

From 2004, volcanic activity pushed aside the glacier lobes and upward by the growth of new volcanic domes. The surface of the glacier, once mostly without crevasses, turned into a chaotic jumble of icefalls heavily criss-crossed with crevasses and seracs caused by movement of the crater floor. The new domes have almost separated the Crater Glacier into an eastern and western lobe. Despite the volcanic activity, the termini of the glacier have still advanced, with a slight advance on the western lobe and a more considerable advance on the more shaded eastern lobe. Due to the advance, two lobes of the glacier joined in late May 2008 and thus the glacier completely surrounds the lava domes. In addition, since 2004, new glaciers have formed on the crater wall above Crater Glacier feeding rock and ice onto its surface below; there are two rock glaciers to the north of the eastern lobe of Crater Glacier.

=== Climate ===
Mount St. Helens has an alpine tundra climate (ET).

Climate data for Mount St. Helens Summit. 1991–2020
| Month | Jan | Feb | Mar | Apr | May | Jun | Jul | Aug | Sep | Oct | Nov | Dec | Year |
|---|---|---|---|---|---|---|---|---|---|---|---|---|---|
| Mean daily maximum °F (°C) | 30.0 (−1.1) | 29.4 (−1.4) | 30.1 (−1.1) | 33.7 (0.9) | 42.3 (5.7) | 48.8 (9.3) | 59.7 (15.4) | 60.2 (15.7) | 55.1 (12.8) | 44.5 (6.9) | 33.0 (0.6) | 28.6 (−1.9) | 41.3 (5.2) |
| Daily mean °F (°C) | 25.1 (−3.8) | 23.2 (−4.9) | 22.9 (−5.1) | 25.4 (−3.7) | 32.9 (0.5) | 38.7 (3.7) | 48.1 (8.9) | 48.6 (9.2) | 44.3 (6.8) | 35.8 (2.1) | 27.6 (−2.4) | 23.9 (−4.5) | 33.0 (0.6) |
| Mean daily minimum °F (°C) | 20.2 (−6.6) | 17.0 (−8.3) | 15.7 (−9.1) | 17.2 (−8.2) | 23.4 (−4.8) | 28.6 (−1.9) | 36.5 (2.5) | 37.1 (2.8) | 33.4 (0.8) | 27.2 (−2.7) | 22.2 (−5.4) | 19.1 (−7.2) | 24.8 (−4.0) |
| Average precipitation inches (mm) | 27.00 (686) | 21.01 (534) | 24.17 (614) | 16.61 (422) | 9.23 (234) | 7.52 (191) | 2.07 (53) | 3.55 (90) | 7.81 (198) | 20.68 (525) | 30.88 (784) | 29.99 (762) | 200.52 (5,093) |
| Average dew point °F (°C) | 18.7 (−7.4) | 16.0 (−8.9) | 15.3 (−9.3) | 16.2 (−8.8) | 22.2 (−5.4) | 27.4 (−2.6) | 33.3 (0.7) | 33.3 (0.7) | 29.4 (−1.4) | 25.4 (−3.7) | 20.8 (−6.2) | 18.2 (−7.7) | 23.0 (−5.0) |
Source: PRISM Climate Group

== Geology ==
Plate tectonics of the Cascade Range

Mount St. Helens is part of the Cascades Volcanic Province, an arc-shaped band extending from southwestern British Columbia to Northern California, roughly parallel to the Pacific coastline. Beneath the Cascade Volcanic Province, a dense oceanic plate sinks beneath the North American Plate; a process known as subduction in geology. As the oceanic slab sinks deeper into the Earth's interior beneath the continental plate, high temperatures and pressures allow water molecules locked in the minerals of solid rock to escape. The supercritical water rises into the pliable mantle above the subducting plate, causing some of the mantle to melt. This newly formed magma ascends upward through the crust along a path of least resistance, both by way of fractures and faults as well as by melting wall rocks. The addition of melted crust changes the geochemical composition. Some of the melt rises toward the Earth's surface to erupt, forming the Cascade Volcanic Arc above the subduction zone.

The magma from the mantle has accumulated in two chambers below the volcano: one approximately 3–7 miles (5–12 km) below the surface, the other about 7–25 miles (12–40 km). The lower chamber may be shared with Mount Adams and the Indian Heaven volcanic field.

=== Ancestral stages of eruptive activity ===
The early eruptive stages of Mount St. Helens are known as the "Ape Canyon Stage" (around 40,000–35,000 years ago), the "Cougar Stage" (ca. 20,000–18,000 years ago), and the "Swift Creek Stage" (roughly 13,000–8,000 years ago). The modern period, since about 2500 BC, is called the "Spirit Lake Stage". Collectively, the pre–Spirit Lake stages are known as the "ancestral stages". The ancestral and modern stages differ primarily in the composition of the erupted lavas; ancestral lavas consisted of a characteristic mixture of dacite and andesite, while modern lava is very diverse (ranging from olivine basalt to andesite and dacite).

St. Helens started its growth in the Pleistocene 37,600 years ago, during the Ape Canyon stage, with dacite and andesite eruptions of hot pumice and ash. Thirty-six thousand years ago a large mudflow cascaded down the volcano; mudflows were significant forces in all of St. Helens' eruptive cycles. The Ape Canyon eruptive period ended around 35,000 years ago and was followed by 17,000 years of relative quiet. Parts of this ancestral cone were fragmented and transported by glaciers 14,000–18,000 years ago during the last glacial period of the current ice age.

The second eruptive period, the Cougar Stage, started 20,000 years ago and lasted for 2,000 years. Pyroclastic flows of hot pumice and ash along with dome growth occurred during this period. Another 5,000 years of dormancy followed, only to be upset by the beginning of the Swift Creek eruptive period, typified by pyroclastic flows, dome growth and blanketing of the countryside with tephra. Swift Creek ended 8,000 years ago.

=== Smith Creek and Pine Creek eruptive periods ===
A dormancy of about 4,000 years was broken around 2500 BC with the start of the Smith Creek eruptive period, when eruptions of large amounts of ash and yellowish-brown pumice covered thousands of square miles. An eruption in 1900 BC was the largest known eruption from St. Helens during the Holocene epoch, depositing the Yn tephra. This eruptive period lasted until about 1600 BC and left 18 inches (46 cm) deep deposits of material 50 miles (80 km) distant in what is now Mount Rainier National Park. Trace deposits have been found as far northeast as Banff National Park in Alberta, and as far southeast as eastern Oregon. All told there may have been up to 2.5 cubic miles (10 km^{3}) of material ejected in this cycle. Some 400 years of dormancy followed.

St. Helens came alive again around 1200 BC—the Pine Creek eruptive period. This lasted until about 800 BC and was characterized by smaller-volume eruptions. Numerous dense, nearly red hot pyroclastic flows sped down St. Helens's flanks and came to rest in nearby valleys. A large mudflow partly filled 40 miles (64 km) of the Lewis River valley sometime between 1000 BC and 500 BC.

=== Castle Creek and Sugar Bowl eruptive periods ===
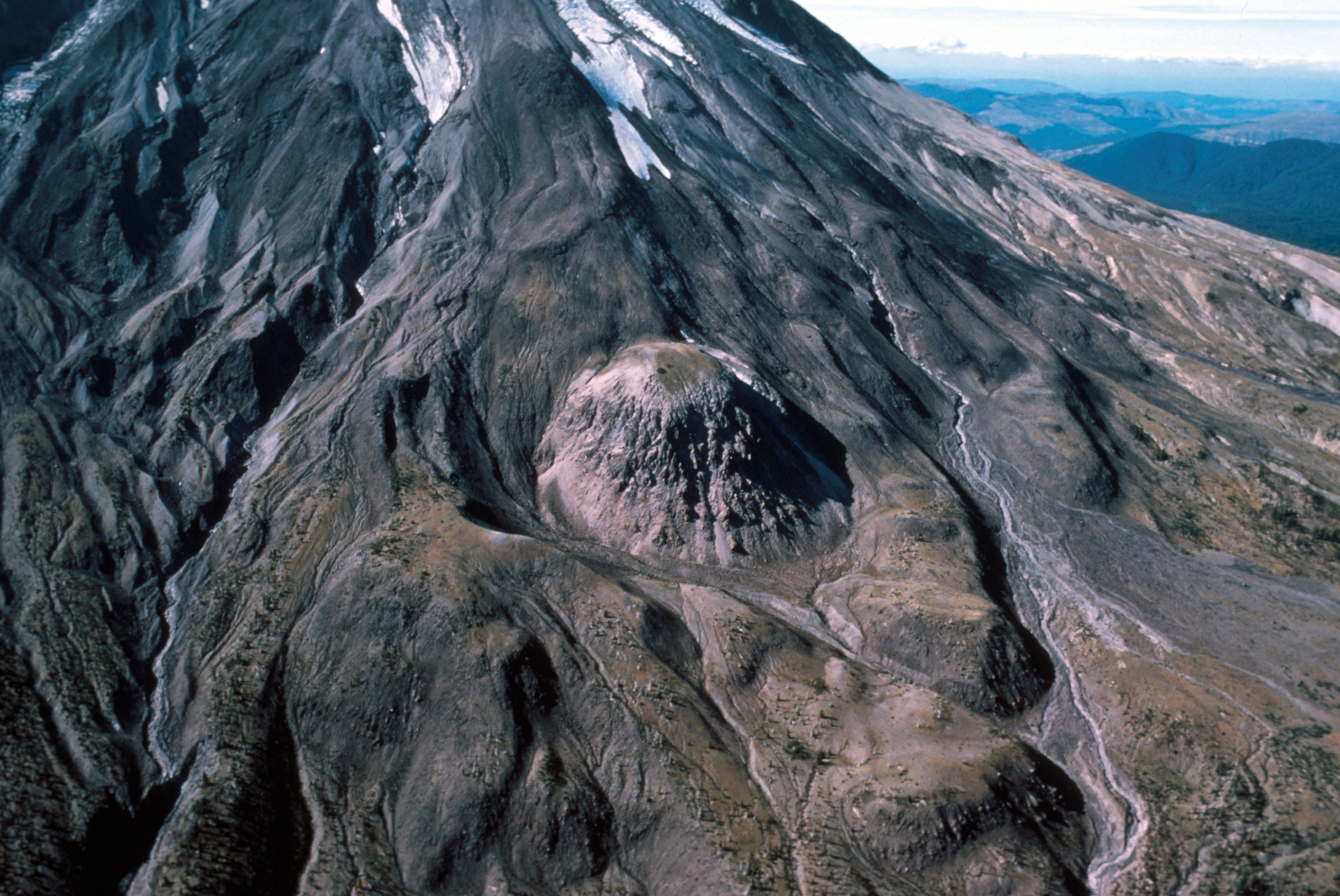
East Dome on the east flank of Mount St. Helens in 2013.

The next eruptive period, the Castle Creek period, began about 400 BC, and is characterized by a change in the composition of St. Helens' lava, with the addition of olivine and basalt. The pre-1980 summit cone started to form during the Castle Creek period. Significant lava flows in addition to the previously much more common fragmented and pulverized lavas and rocks (tephra) distinguished this period. Large lava flows of andesite and basalt covered parts of the mountain, including one around the year 100 BC that traveled all the way into the Lewis and Kalama river valleys. Others, such as Cave Basalt (known for its system of lava tubes), flowed up to 9 miles (14 km) from their vents. During the first century, mudflows moved 30 miles (50 km) down the Toutle and Kalama river valleys and may have reached the Columbia River. Another 400 years of dormancy ensued.

The Sugar Bowl eruptive period was short and markedly different from other periods in Mount St. Helens history. It produced the only unequivocal laterally directed blast known from Mount St. Helens before the 1980 eruptions. During Sugar Bowl time, the volcano first erupted quietly to produce a dome, then erupted violently at least twice producing a small volume of tephra, directed-blast deposits, pyroclastic flows, and lahars. East Dome, a small hypersthene-homblende dacite dome on the east slope of the volcano, was likely formed around the Sugar Bowl period. Formation of East Dome was preceded by an explosive eruption.

=== Kalama and Goat Rocks eruptive periods ===
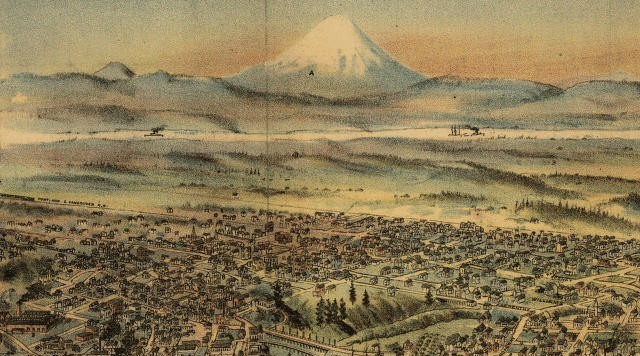
The symmetrical appearance of St. Helens prior to the 1980 eruption earned it the nickname "Mount Fuji of America". The once-familiar shape was formed out of the Kalama and Goat Rocks eruptive periods.

Roughly 700 years of dormancy were broken in about 1480, when large amounts of pale gray dacite pumice and ash started to erupt, beginning the Kalama period. The 1480 eruption was several times larger than that of May 18, 1980. In 1482, another large eruption rivaling the 1980 eruption in volume is known to have occurred. Ash and pumice piled 6 miles (9.7 km) northeast of the volcano to a thickness of 3 feet (0.9 m); 50 miles (80 km) away, the ash was 2 inches (5 cm) deep. Large pyroclastic flows and mudflows subsequently rushed down St. Helens' west flanks and into the Kalama River drainage system.

This 150-year period next saw the eruption of less silica-rich lava in the form of andesitic ash that formed at least eight alternating light- and dark-colored layers. Blocky andesite lava then flowed from St. Helens' summit crater down the volcano's southeast flank. Later, pyroclastic flows raced down over the andesite lava and into the Kalama River valley. It ended with the emplacement of a dacite dome several hundred feet (~200 m) high at the volcano's summit, which filled and overtopped an explosion crater already at the summit. Large parts of the dome's sides broke away and mantled parts of the volcano's cone with talus. Lateral explosions excavated a notch in the southeast crater wall. St. Helens reached its greatest height and achieved its highly symmetrical form by the time the Kalama eruptive cycle ended, in about 1647. The volcano remained quiet for the next 150 years.

The 57-year eruptive period that started in 1800 was named after the Goat Rocks dome and is the first period for which both oral and written records exist. As with the Kalama period, the Goat Rocks period started with an explosion of dacite tephra, followed by an andesite lava flow, and culminated with the emplacement of a dacite dome. The 1800 eruption probably rivaled the 1980 eruption in size, although it did not result in massive destruction of the cone. The ash drifted northeast over central and eastern Washington, northern Idaho, and western Montana. There were at least a dozen reported small eruptions of ash from 1831 to 1857, including a fairly large one in 1842. (The 1831 eruption is likely what tinted the sun bluish-green in Southampton County, Virginia on the afternoon of August 13—which Nat Turner interpreted as a final signal to launch the United States' largest slave rebellion.) The vent was apparently at or near Goat Rocks on the northeast flank. Goat Rocks dome was near the site of the bulge in the 1980 eruption, and it was obliterated in the major eruption event on May 18, 1980, that destroyed the entire north face and top 1,300 feet (400 m) of the mountain.

=== Modern eruptive period ===
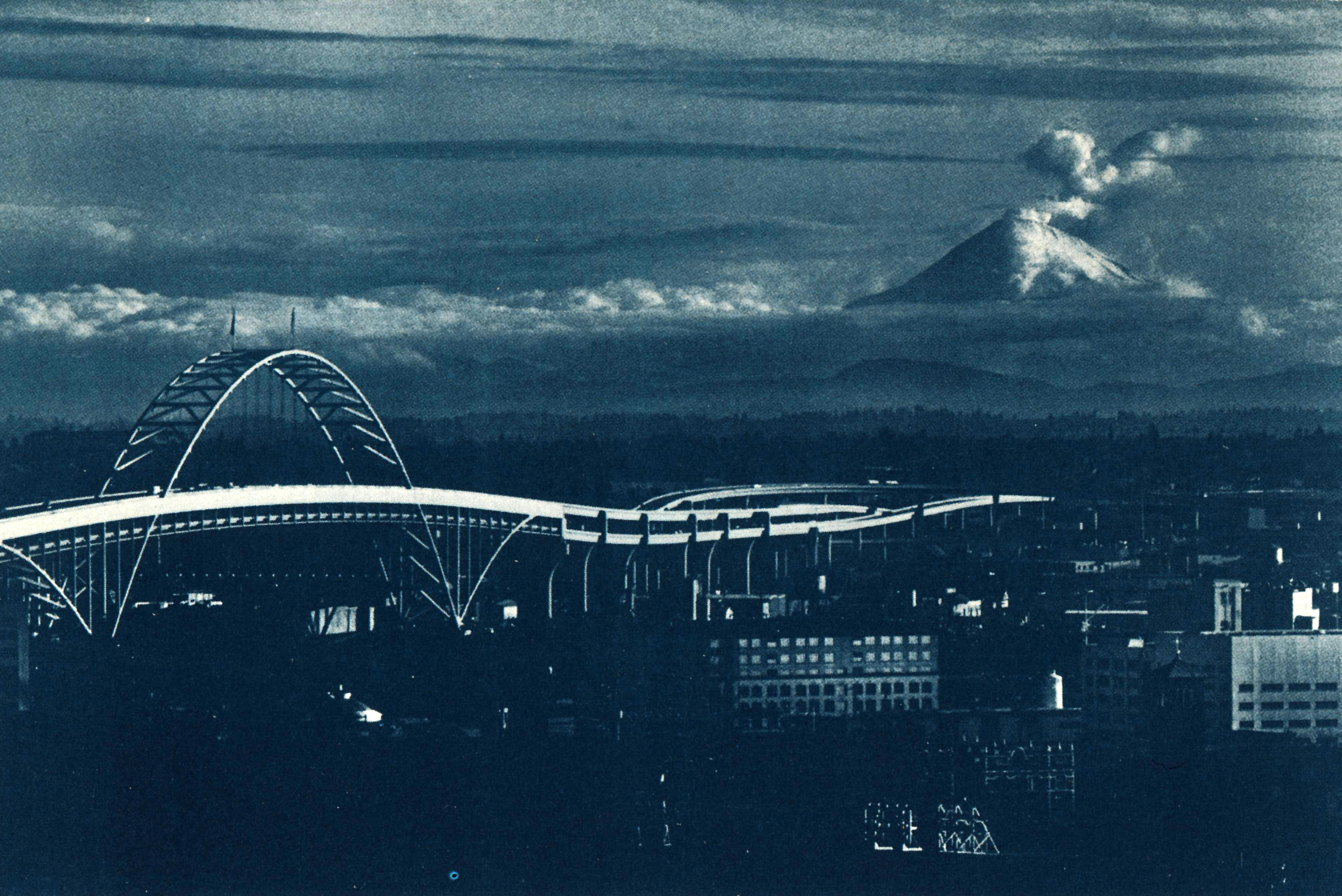
Mount St. Helens during an eruption prior to May 18, as viewed from Portland, Oregon. The Fremont Bridge is visible in the bottom left corner.

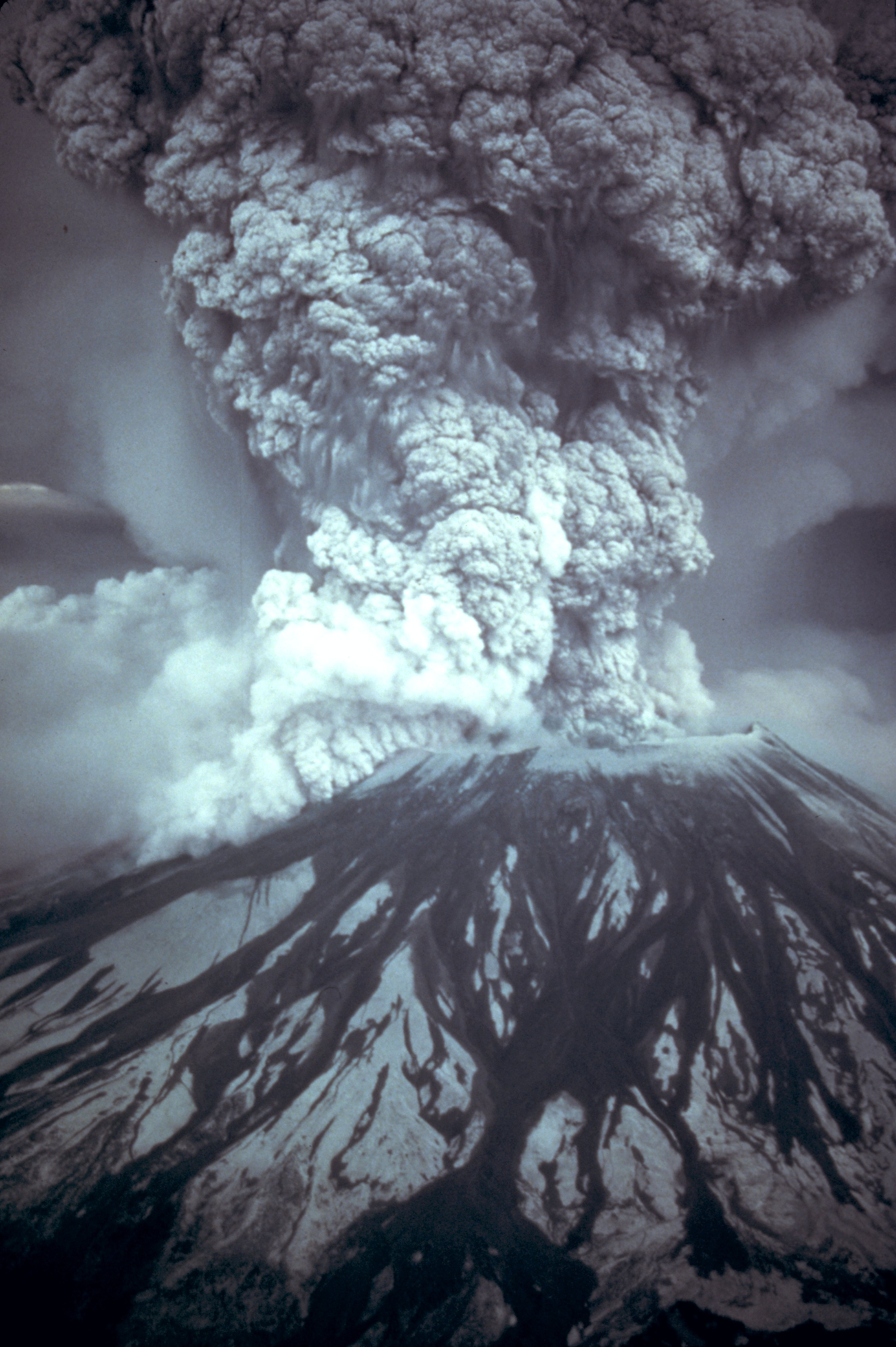
Mount St. Helens erupted on May 18, 1980, at 08:32 PDT.

==== 1980 to 2001 activity ====
On March 20, 1980, Mount St. Helens experienced a magnitude 4.2 earthquake, and on March 27, steam venting started. By the end of April, the north side of the mountain had started to bulge. On May 18, at 8:32 am, a second earthquake, of magnitude 5.1, triggered a massive collapse of the north face of the mountain. It was the largest known debris avalanche in recorded history. The magma in St. Helens burst forth into a large-scale pyroclastic flow that flattened vegetation and buildings over an area of 230 square miles (600 km^{2}). More than 1.5 million metric tons of sulfur dioxide were released into the atmosphere. On the Volcanic Explosivity Index scale, the eruption was rated a 5, and categorized as a Plinian eruption.

The collapse of the northern flank of St. Helens mixed with ice, snow, and water to create lahars (volcanic mudflows). The lahars flowed many miles down the Toutle and Cowlitz Rivers, destroying bridges and lumber camps. A total of 3,900,000 cubic yards (3,000,000 m^{3}) of material was transported 17 miles (27 km) south into the Columbia River by the mudflows.

For more than nine hours, a vigorous plume of ash erupted, eventually reaching 12 to 16 miles (19 to 26 km) above sea level. The plume moved eastward at an average speed of 60 miles per hour (100 km/h) with ash reaching Idaho by noon. Ashes from the eruption were found on top of cars and roofs the next morning as far away as Edmonton, Alberta, Canada.

By about 5:30 p.m. on May 18, the vertical ash column declined in stature, and less-severe outbursts continued through the night and for the next several days. The St. Helens May 18 eruption released 24 megatons of thermal energy and ejected more than 0.67 cubic miles (2.79 km^{3}) of material. The removal of the north side of the mountain reduced St. Helens' height by about 1,300 feet (400 m) and left a crater 1.2 to 1.8 miles (2 to 3 km) wide and 2,084 feet (635 m) deep, with its north end open in a huge breach. The eruption killed 57 people, nearly 7,000 big-game animals (deer, elk, and bear), and an estimated 12 million fish from a hatchery. It destroyed or extensively damaged more than 200 homes, 185 miles (298 km) of highway, and 15 miles (24 km) of railways.

Between 1980 and 1986, activity continued at Mount St. Helens, with a new lava dome forming in the crater. Numerous small explosions and dome-building eruptions occurred. From December 7, 1989, to January 6, 1990, and from November 5, 1990, to February 14, 1991, the mountain erupted, sometimes with huge clouds of ash.

==== 2004 to 2008 activity ====
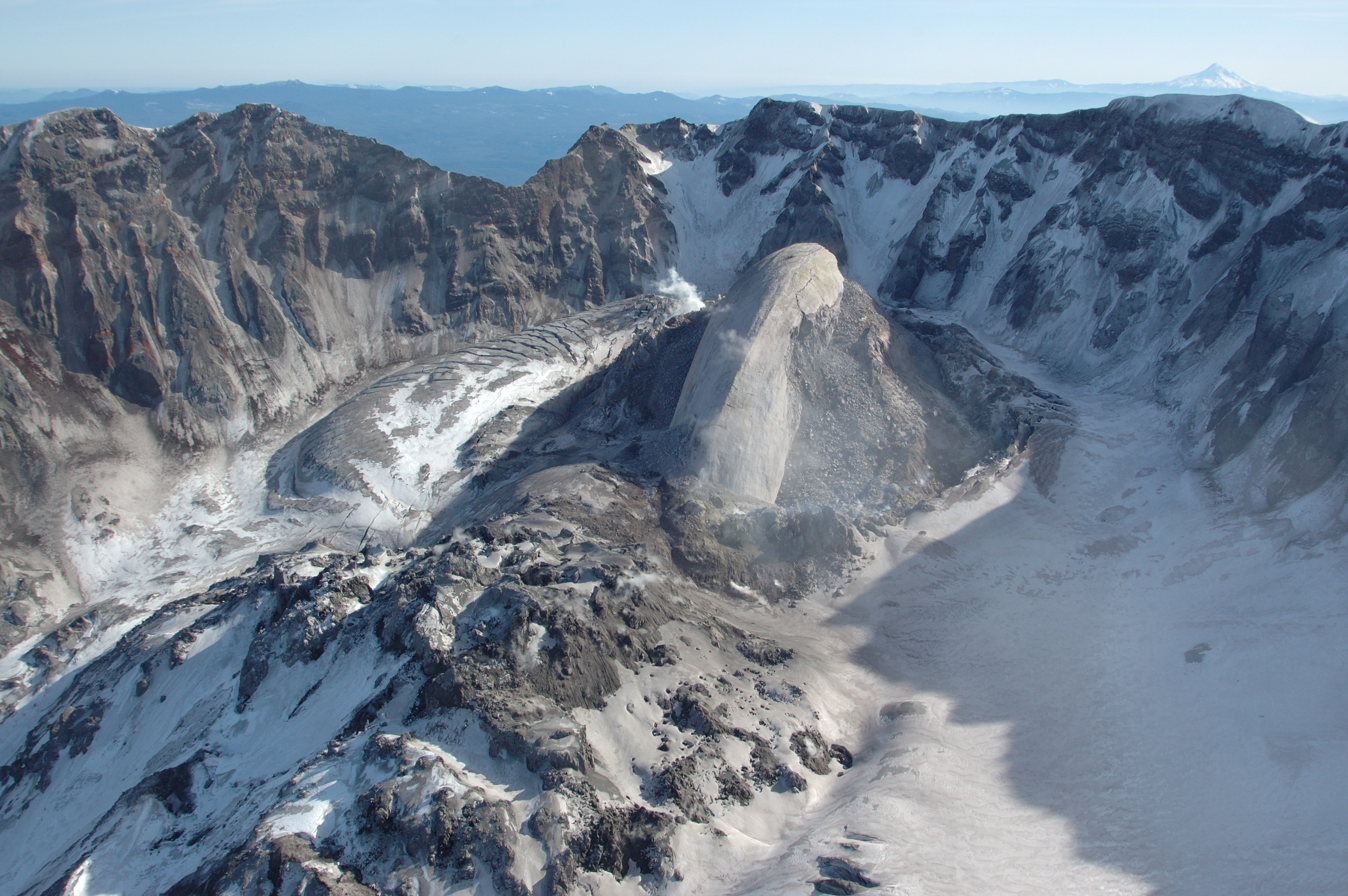
Appearance of the "Whaleback" in February 2005

Magma reached the surface of the volcano about October 11, 2004, resulting in the building of a new lava dome on the existing dome's south side. This new dome continued to grow throughout 2005 and into 2006. Several transient features were observed, such as a lava spine nicknamed the "whaleback", which comprised long shafts of solidified magma being extruded by the pressure of magma beneath. These features were fragile and broke down soon after they were formed. On July 2, 2005, the tip of the whaleback broke off, causing a rockfall that sent ash and dust several hundred meters into the air.

Mount St. Helens showed significant activity on March 8, 2005, when a 36,000-foot (11,000 m) plume of steam and ash emerged—visible from Seattle. This relatively minor eruption was a release of pressure consistent with ongoing dome building. The release was accompanied by a magnitude 2.5 earthquake.

Another feature to emerge from the dome was called the "fin" or "slab". Approximately half the size of a football field, the large, cooled volcanic rock was being forced upward as quickly as 6 ft (2 m) per day. In mid-June 2006, the slab was crumbling in frequent rockfalls, although it was still being extruded. The height of the dome was 7,550 feet (2,300 m), still below the height reached in July 2005 when the whaleback collapsed.

On October 22, 2006, at 3:13 p.m. PST, a magnitude 3.5 earthquake broke loose Spine 7. The collapse and avalanche of the lava dome sent an ash plume 2,000 feet (600 m) over the western rim of the crater; the ash plume then rapidly dissipated.

On December 19, 2006, a large white plume of condensing steam was observed, leading some media people to assume there had been a small eruption. However, the Cascades Volcano Observatory of the USGS did not mention any significant ash plume. The volcano was in continuous eruption from October 2004, but this eruption consisted in large part of a gradual extrusion of lava forming a dome in the crater.

On January 16, 2008, steam began seeping from a fracture on top of the lava dome. Associated seismic activity was the most noteworthy since 2004. Scientists suspended activities in the crater and the mountain flanks, but the risk of a major eruption was deemed low. By the end of January, the eruption paused; no more lava was being extruded from the lava dome. On July 10, 2008, it was determined that the eruption had ended, after more than six months of no volcanic activity.

=== Future hazards ===
Future eruptions of Mount St. Helens will likely be even larger than the 1980 eruption. A large lahar flow is likely on branches of the Toutle River, possibly causing destruction in inhabited areas along the I-5 corridor.

The volcano is considered "very high threat" by the United States Geological Survey and is closely monitored by the Cascades Volcano Observatory.

== Ecology and environment ==
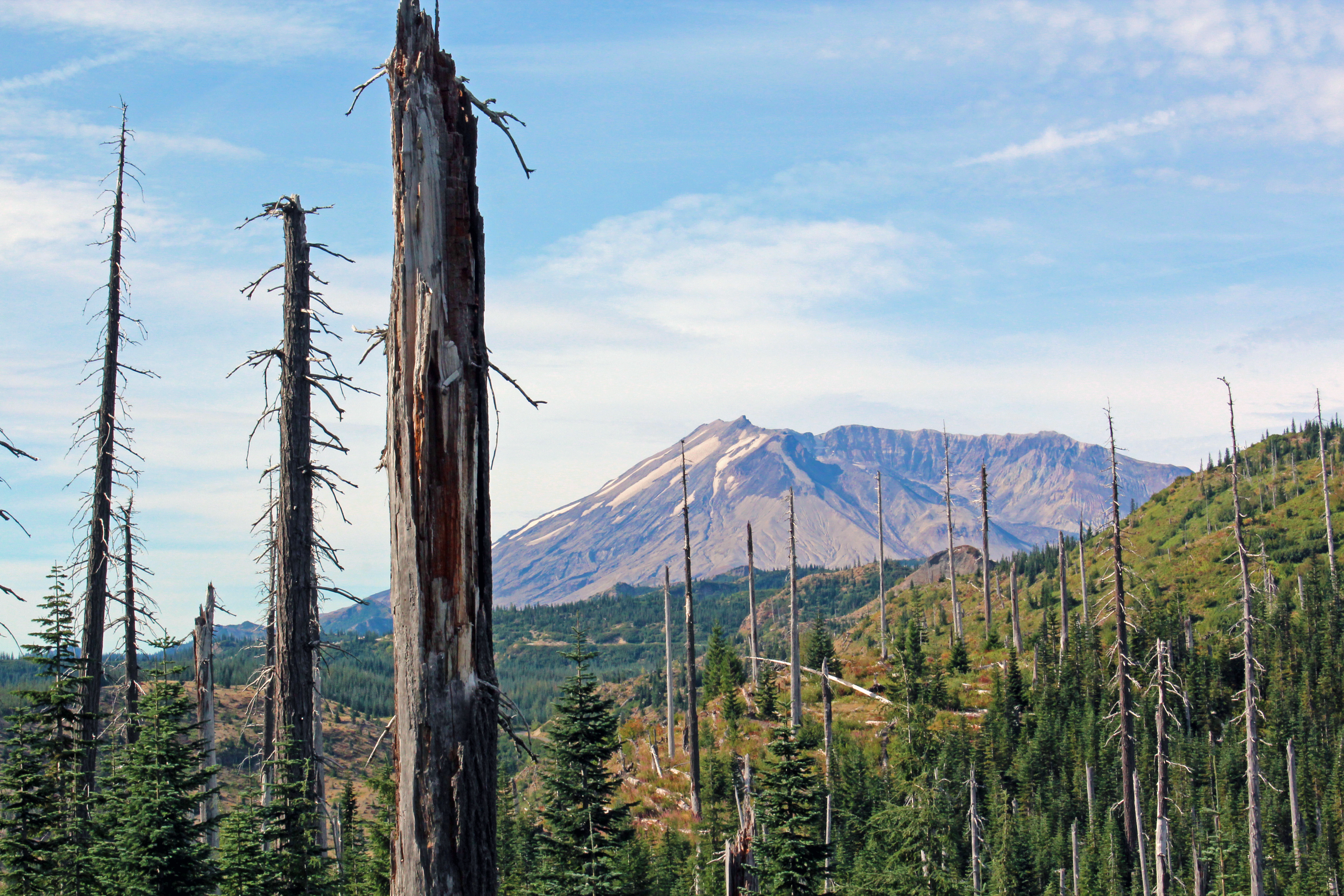
Twenty years after the 1980 eruption, trees killed by the blast were still standing.

In its undisturbed state, the slopes of Mount St. Helens lie in the Western Cascades Montane Highlands ecoregion. This ecoregion has abundant precipitation; an average of 93.4 inches (2,373 mm) of precipitation falls each year at Spirit Lake. This precipitation supported dense forest up to 3,000 feet (900 m), with western hemlock, Douglas fir, and western redcedar. Above this, this forest was dominated by Pacific silver fir up to 4,300 feet (1,300 m). Finally, below treeline, the forest consisted of mountain hemlock, Pacific silver fir and Alaska yellow cedar. Large mammals included Roosevelt elk, black-tailed deer, American black bear, and mountain lion.

The treeline at Mount St. Helens was unusually low, at about 4,400 feet (1,340 m), the result of prior volcanic disturbance of the forest, as the treeline was thought to be moving up the slopes before the eruption. Alpine meadows were uncommon at Mount St. Helens. Mountain goats inhabited higher elevations of the peak, although their population was eliminated by the 1980 eruption.

=== Ecological disturbance caused by eruption ===
The eruption of Mount St. Helens has been subject to more ecological study than has any other eruption, because research into disturbance commenced immediately after the eruption and because the eruption did not sterilize the immediate area. More than half of the papers on ecological response to volcanic eruption originated from studies of Mount St. Helens.

Perhaps the most important ecological concept originating from the study of Mount St. Helens is the biological legacy. Biological legacies are the survivors of catastrophic disturbance; they can either be alive (e.g., plants that survive ashfall or pyroclastic flow), organic debris, or biotic patterns remaining from before the disturbance. These biological legacies highly influence the reestablishment of the post-disturbance ecology.

Some species from each trophic level survived the 1980 eruption, which allowed for relatively quick re-establishment of food webs. Larger species saw greater mortality rates, with each of the area's large mammals — mountain goats, elk, deer, black bear and cougars — completely decimated. Eventually, each of the larger mammals migrated back into the area. Without access to adequate forage, many elk starved to death in the winters in the following decades. By 2014, the mountain goat population had grown back to 65 members. In 2015, there were 152. Mountain goats are culturally significant to the Cowlitz Indian Tribe, whose members historically harvested shed tufts of goat wool left behind on the mountain, and the tribe has played a role in monitoring the population, which continues to recover without human intervention.

=== Wildlife ===
North American beavers were reintroduced to wetland areas on the southern flank of the mountain in May 2026. The species had not been a part of the ecosystem for decades. Led by a relocation program of the Cowlitz Indian Tribe, a family of beavers was placed near a dammed and terraced spot built by prior beaver populations on Pine Creek. The creek, a tributary of the Lewis River, is one of the last remaining breeding grounds of bull trout in the connected waterways.

Since the late-1980s construction of the Sediment Retention Structure (SRS) on the North Fork Toutle River, coho and steelhead have been trapped and released above the sediment-capturing dam. In June 2026, hatchery-raised, Chinook salmon were released upstream for the first time at South Coldwater Creek. The efforts were led by various state and federal agencies, conservation groups, and indigenous tribes, such as the Cowlitz Indian Tribe.

== Human history ==
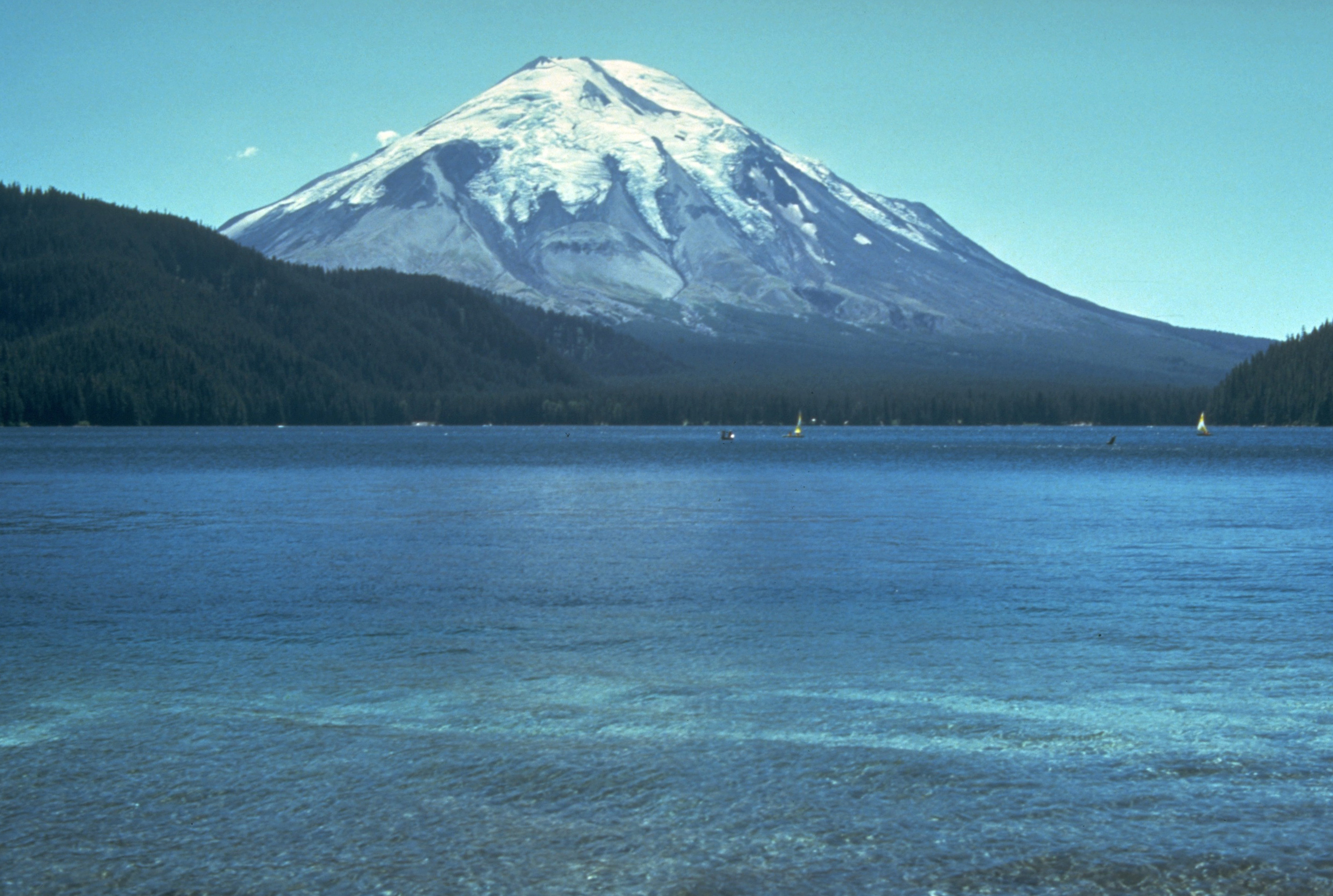
Indigenous American legends were inspired by the volcano's beauty.

=== Importance to indigenous tribes ===
Native American lore contains numerous stories to explain the eruptions of Mount St. Helens and other Cascade volcanoes. The best known of these is the Bridge of the Gods story told by the Klickitat people.

In the story, the chief of all the gods and his two sons, Pahto (also called Klickitat) and Wy'east, traveled down the Columbia River from the Far North in search for a suitable area to settle.

They came upon an area that is now called The Dalles and thought they had never seen a land so beautiful. The sons quarreled over the land, so to solve the dispute their father shot two arrows from his mighty bow – one to the north and the other to the south. Pahto followed the arrow to the north and settled there while Wy'east did the same for the arrow to the south. The chief of the gods then built the Bridge of the Gods, so his family could meet periodically.

When the two sons of the chief of the gods fell in love with a beautiful maiden named Loowit, she could not choose between them. The two young chiefs fought over her, burying villages and forests in the process. The area was devastated and the earth shook so violently that the huge bridge fell into the river, creating the cascades of the Columbia River Gorge.

For punishment, the chief of the gods struck down each of the lovers and transformed them into great mountains where they fell. Wy'east, with his head lifted in pride, became the volcano known today as Mount Hood. Pahto, with his head bent toward his fallen love, was turned into Mount Adams. The beautiful Loowit became Mount St. Helens, known to the Klickitats as Louwala-Clough, which means "smoking or fire mountain" in their language (the Sahaptin call the mountain Loowit).

The mountain is also of sacred importance to the Cowlitz and Yakama tribes that also live in the area. They find the area above its tree line to be of exceptional spiritual significance, and the mountain (which they call "Lawetlat'la", roughly translated as "the smoker") features prominently in their creation story, and in some of their songs and rituals. In recognition of its cultural significance, over 12,000 acres (4,900 ha) of the mountain (roughly bounded by the Loowit Trail) have been listed on the National Register of Historic Places.

Other area tribal names for the mountain include "nšh'ák'w" ("water coming out") from the Upper Chehalis, and "aka akn" ("snow mountain"), a Kiksht term.

=== Exploration by Europeans ===
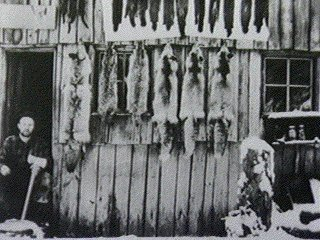
19th-century photo of a fur trapper working in the Mount St. Helens area

Royal Navy Commander George Vancouver and the officers of HMS Discovery made the Europeans' first recorded sighting of Mount St. Helens on May 19, 1792, while surveying the northern Pacific Ocean coast. Vancouver named the mountain for British diplomat Alleyne FitzHerbert, 1st Baron St Helens, on October 20, 1792, as it came into view when the Discovery passed into the mouth of the Columbia River.

Years later, explorers, traders, and missionaries heard reports of an erupting volcano in the area. Geologists and historians determined much later that the eruption took place in 1800, marking the beginning of the 57 year-long Goat Rocks Eruptive Period (see geology section). Alarmed by the "dry snow", the Nespelem tribe of northeastern Washington supposedly danced and prayed rather than collecting food and suffered during that winter from starvation.

In late 1805 and early 1806, members of the Lewis and Clark Expedition spotted Mount St. Helens from the Columbia River but did not report either an ongoing eruption or recent evidence of one. They did however report the presence of quicksand and clogged channel conditions at the mouth of the Sandy River near Portland, suggesting an eruption by Mount Hood sometime in the previous decades.

In 1829, Hall J. Kelley led a campaign to rename the Cascade Range as the President's Range and also to rename each major Cascade mountain after a former President of the United States. In his scheme Mount St. Helens was to be renamed Mount Washington.

=== European colonization and use of the area ===
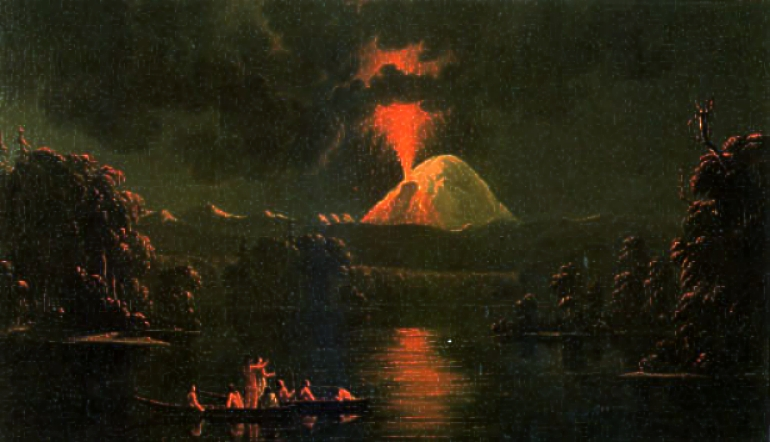
Painting by Paul Kane Mount St. Helens erupting at night after his 1847 visit to the area

The first authenticated non-Indigenous eyewitness report of a volcanic eruption was made in March 1835 by Meredith Gairdner, while working for the Hudson's Bay Company stationed at Fort Vancouver. He sent an account to the Edinburgh New Philosophical Journal, which published his letter in January 1836. James Dwight Dana of Yale University, while sailing with the United States Exploring Expedition, saw the quiescent peak from off the mouth of the Columbia River in 1841. Another member of the expedition later described "cellular basaltic lavas" at the mountain's base.

In the late fall or early winter of 1842, nearby European settlers and missionaries witnessed the so-called Great Eruption. This small-volume outburst created large ash clouds, and mild explosions followed for 15 years. The eruptions of this period were likely phreatic (steam explosions). Josiah Parrish in Champoeg, Oregon witnessed Mount St. Helens in eruption on November 22, 1842. Ash from this eruption may have reached The Dalles, Oregon, 48 miles (77 km) southeast of the volcano.

In October 1843, future California governor Peter H. Burnett recounted a very likely apocryphal story of an Indigenous man who badly burned his foot and leg in lava or hot ash while hunting for deer. The story went that the injured man sought treatment at Fort Vancouver, but the contemporary fort commissary steward, Napoleon McGilvery, disclaimed knowledge of the incident. British lieutenant Henry J. Warre sketched the eruption in 1845, and two years later Canadian painter Paul Kane created watercolors of the gently smoking mountain. Warre's work showed erupting material from a vent about a third of the way down from the summit on the mountain's west or northwest side (possibly at Goat Rocks), and one of Kane's field sketches shows smoke emanating from about the same location.

On April 17, 1857, the Republican, a Steilacoom, Washington, newspaper, reported that "Mount St. Helens, or some other mount to the southward, is seen ... to be in a state of eruption". The lack of a significant ash layer associated with this event indicates that it was a small eruption. This was the first reported volcanic activity since 1854.

Before the 1980 eruption, Spirit Lake offered year-round recreational activities. In the summer there was boating, swimming, and camping, while in the winter there was skiing. The mountain was regularly climbed via the north side glaciers, now gone, requiring crampons, ice axes, and rope.

=== Human impact from the 1980 eruption ===
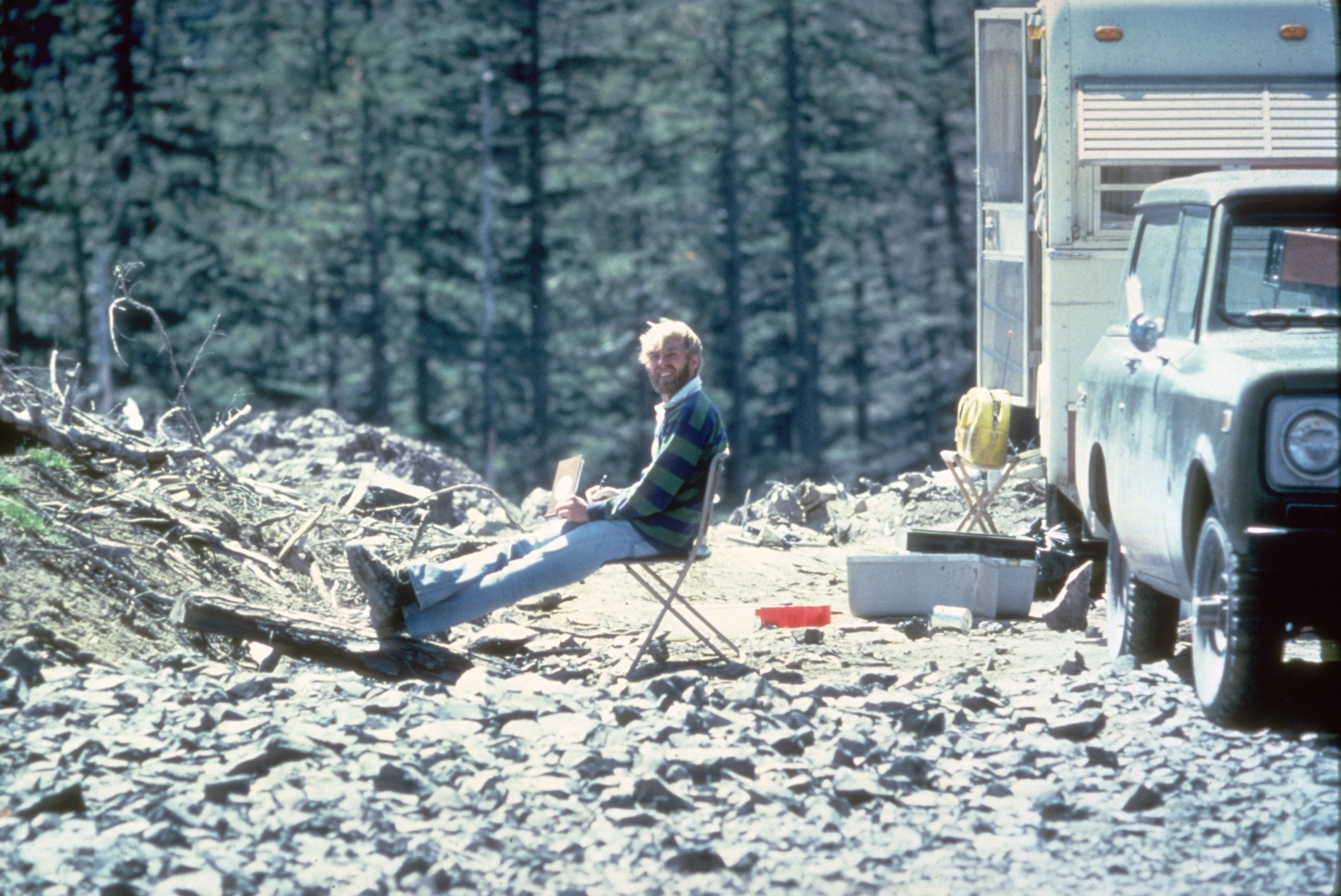
David A. Johnston hours before he was killed by the eruption

Fifty-seven people were killed during the eruption. Had the eruption occurred one day later, when loggers would have been at work, rather than on a Sunday, the death toll could have been much higher.

Eighty-three-year-old Harry R. Truman, who ran the Spirit Lake Lodge and had lived near the mountain since 1929, gained much media attention when he decided not to evacuate before the impending eruption, despite repeated pleas by local authorities. His body was never found after the eruption.

Another victim of the eruption was 30-year-old volcanologist David A. Johnston, who was stationed on the nearby Coldwater Ridge. Moments before his position was hit by the pyroclastic flow, Johnston radioed his last words: "Vancouver! Vancouver! This is it!" Johnston's body was never found. Robert Landsburg was another victim, a photographer who took pictures of the approaching ash cloud. He placed his camera in his backpack and laid on top of it to protect the film. His body and the camera were found on June 4, 1980. The photos survived and provided geologists with valuable documentation of the eruption.

U.S. President Jimmy Carter surveyed the damage and said, "Someone said this area looked like a moonscape, but the moon looks more like a golf course compared to what's up there." A film crew, led by Seattle filmmaker Otto Seiber, was dropped by helicopter on St. Helens on May 23 to document the destruction. Their compasses, however, spun in circles and they quickly became lost. A second eruption occurred on May 25, but the crew survived and was rescued two days later by National Guard helicopter pilots. Their film, The Eruption of Mount St. Helens!, later became a popular documentary.

The eruption had negative effects beyond the immediate area of the volcano. Ashfall caused approximately $100 million of damage to agriculture downwind in Eastern Washington, equivalent to $391 million in 2025.

The eruption also had positive impacts on society. Apple and wheat production were higher in the 1980 growing season, possibly due to ash helping to retain moisture in the soil. The ash was also a source of income: it was the raw material for the artificial gemstone helenite, or for ceramic glazes, or sold as a tourist curio.

=== Protection and later history ===
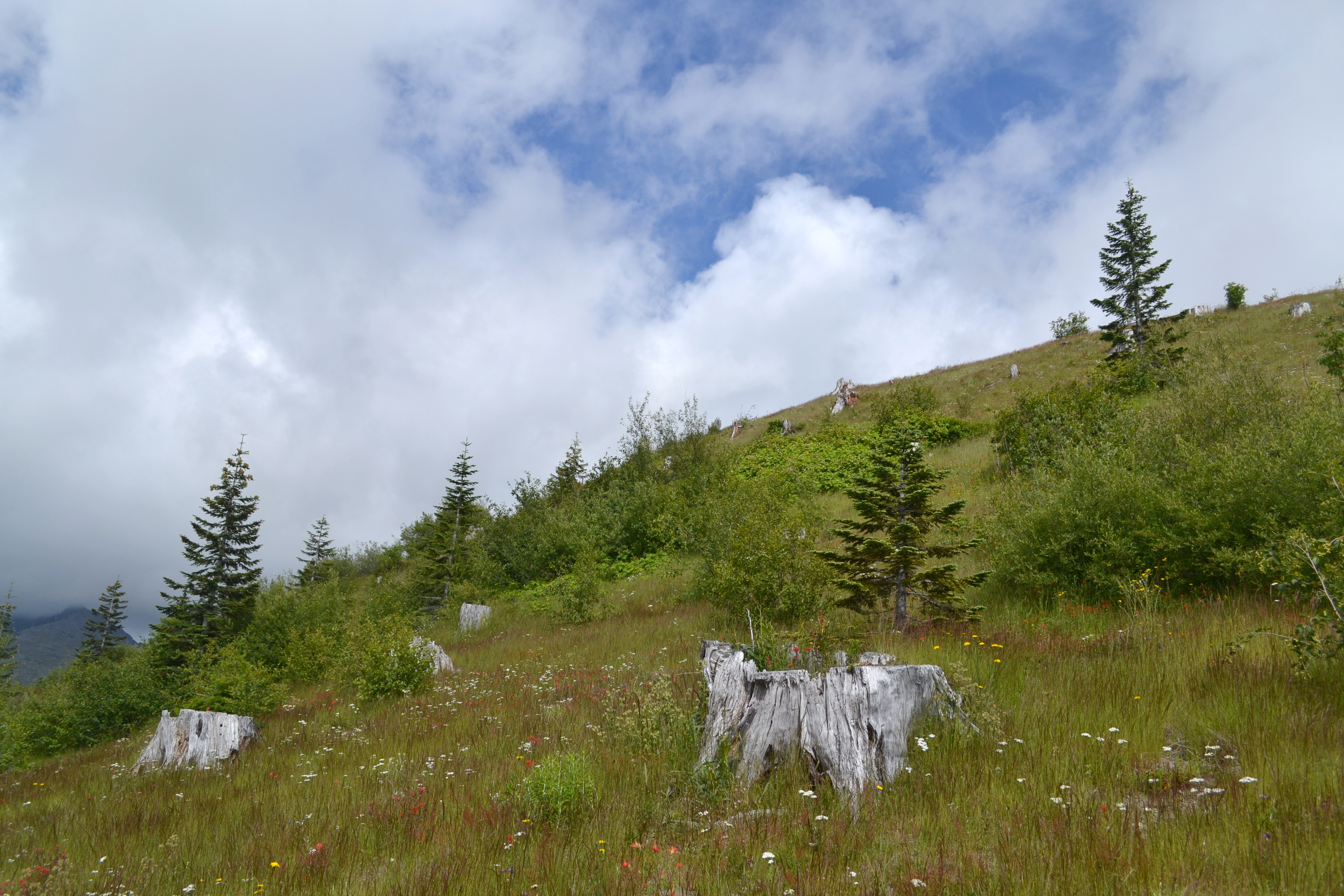
View of the hillside at the Johnston Ridge Observatory (named for David A. Johnston), July 16, 2016, 36 years after the eruption, showing recovering plant growth

In 1982, President Ronald Reagan and the U.S. Congress established the Mount St. Helens National Volcanic Monument, a 110,000-acre (45,000 ha) area around the mountain and within the Gifford Pinchot National Forest.

Following the 1980 eruption, the area was left to gradually return to its natural state. In 1987, the U.S. Forest Service reopened the mountain to climbing. It remained open until 2004 when renewed activity caused the closure of the area around the mountain (see Geological history section above for more details). The Monitor Ridge trail, which previously let up to 100 permitted hikers per day climb to the summit, ceased operation. On July 21, 2006, the mountain was again opened to climbers. In February 2010, a climber died after falling from the rim into the crater.

Due to the eruption, the state recognizes the month of May as "Volcano Awareness Month" and events are held at Mt. St. Helens, or within the region, to discuss the eruption, safety concerns, and to commemorate lives lost during the natural disaster.

On May 14, 2023, a mudslide and debris flow, termed the South Coldwater Slide by the U.S. Forest Service, destroyed the 85-foot (26 m) Spirit Lake Outlet Bridge on Washington State Route 504 and cut off access to the Johnston Ridge Observatory. Closures and access to Coldwater Lake and hiking trails would vary in the month after the slide.

== Climbing and recreation ==
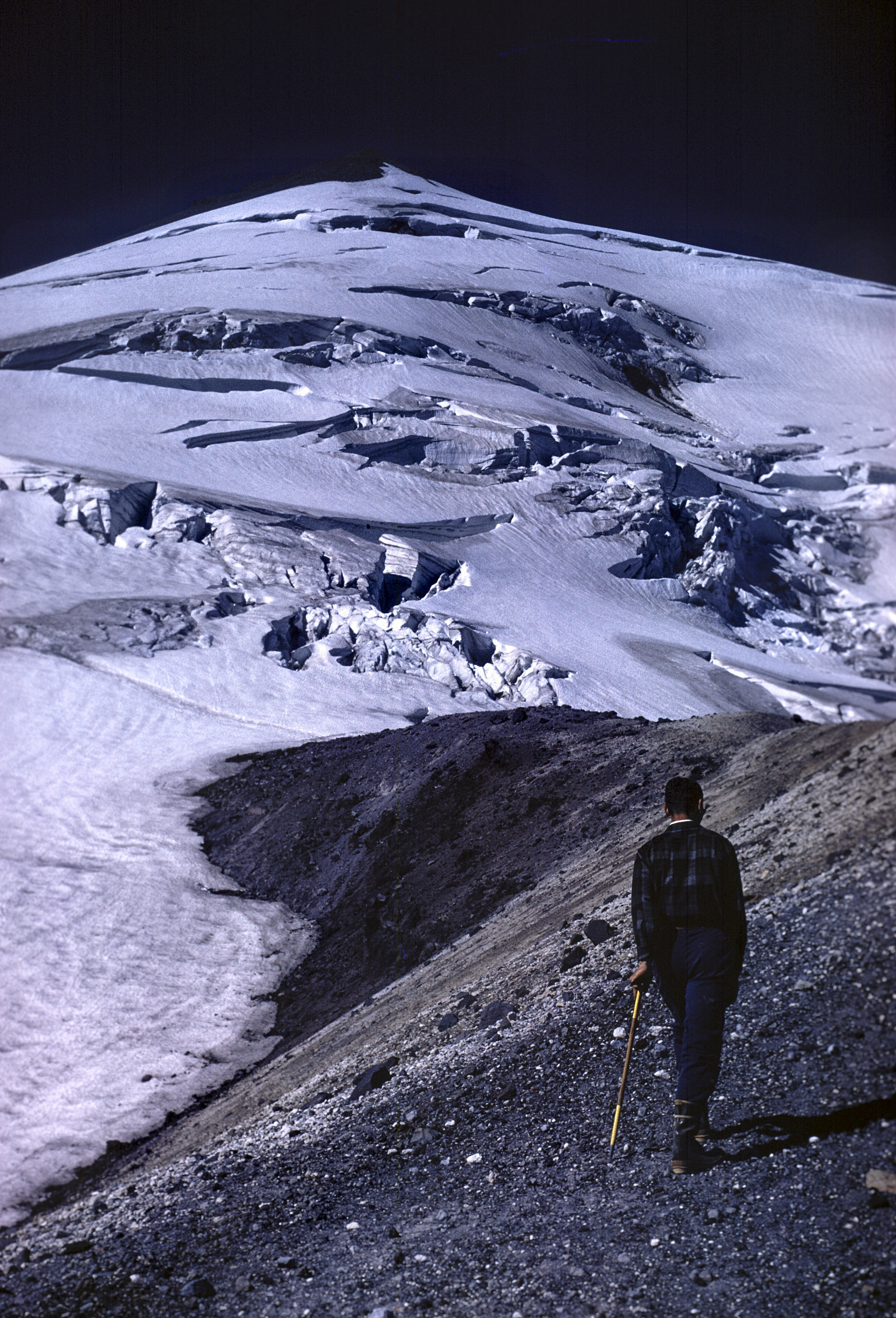
Climber approaching the north side glaciers, 1970

Mount St. Helens is a common climbing destination for both beginning and experienced mountaineers. The peak is climbed year-round, although it is more often climbed from late spring through early fall. All routes include sections of steep, rugged terrain. A permit system has been in place for climbers since 1987. A climbing permit is required year-round for anyone who will be above 4,800 feet (1,500 m) on the slopes of Mount St. Helens.

The standard hiking/mountaineering route in the warmer months is the Monitor Ridge Route, which starts at the Climbers Bivouac. This is the most crowded route to the summit in the summer and gains about 4,600 feet (1,400 m) in approximately 5 miles (8 km) to reach the crater rim. Although strenuous, it is considered a non-technical climb that involves some scrambling. Most climbers complete the round trip in 7 to 12 hours.

The Worm Flows Route is considered the standard winter route on Mount St. Helens, as it is the most direct route to the summit. The route gains about 5,700 feet (1,700 m) in elevation over about 6 miles (10 km) from trailhead to summit but does not demand the technical climbing that some other Cascade peaks like Mount Rainier do. The route name refers to the rocky lava flows that surround the route. This route can be accessed via the Marble Mountain Sno-Park and the Swift Ski Trail.

The mountain is now circled by the Loowit Trail at elevations of 4,000–4,900 feet (1,200–1,500 m). The northern segment of the trail from the South Fork Toutle River on the west to Windy Pass on the east is a restricted zone where camping, biking, pets, fires, and off-trail excursions are all prohibited.

On April 14, 2008, John Slemp, a snowmobiler from Damascus, Oregon, fell 1,500 feet into the crater after a snow cornice gave way beneath him on a trip to the volcano with his son. Despite his long fall, Slemp survived with minor injuries, and was able to walk after coming to a stop at the foot of the crater wall, where he was rescued by a mountain rescue helicopter.

A visitor center run by the Washington State Parks is in Silver Lake, Washington, about 30 miles (48 km) west of Mount St. Helens. Exhibits include a large model of the volcano, a seismograph, a theater program, and an outdoor natural trail.

Panoramic view from the summit of Mount St. Helens as seen in October 2009. Climbers stand on the crater rim and are visible along the Monitor Ridge climbing route.

== See also ==
- List of volcanic eruptions by death toll
- List of volcanoes in the United States
