= List of glaciers of South Shetland Islands =

South Shetland Islands

Following is a list of glaciers of the South Shetland Islands in Antarctica. This list may not reflect recently named glaciers in the South Shetland Islands.

== Clarence Island ==
- Banari Glacier
- Bersame Glacier
- Dobrodan Glacier
- Giridava Glacier
- Highton Glacier
- Orcho Glacier
- Skaplizo Glacier
- Treskavets Glacier

== Elephant Island ==
- Endurance Glacier
- Furness Glacier
- Sultan Glacier

== Greenwich Island ==
- Bravo Glacier
- Fuerza Aérea Glacier
- Murgash Glacier
- Musala Glacier
- Quito Glacier
- Solis Glacier
- Targovishte Glacier
- Teteven Glacier
- Traub Glacier
- Wulfila Glacier
- Yakoruda Glacier
- Zheravna Glacier

== King George Island ==
- Anna Glacier
- Baranowski Glacier
- Domeyko Glacier
- Ecology Glacier
- Eldred Glacier
- Flagstaff Glacier
- Fourcade Glacier
- Goetel Glacier
- Krak Glacier
- Lange Glacier
- Noble Glacier
- Poetry Glacier
- Polar Club Glacier
- Stenhouse Glacier
- Usher Glacier

== Livingston Island ==
- Argentina Glacier
- Berkovitsa Glacier
- Boyana Glacier
- Charity Glacier
- Contell Glacier
- Debelt Glacier
- Dobrudzha Glacier
- Huntress Glacier
- Huron Glacier
- Iskar Glacier
- Johnsons Glacier
- Kaliakra Glacier
- Kamchiya Glacier
- Las Palmas Glacier
- Macy Glacier
- Magura Glacier
- Medven Glacier
- Panega Glacier
- Pautalia Glacier
- Perunika Glacier
- Peshtera Glacier
- Pimpirev Glacier
- Prespa Glacier
- Ropotamo Glacier
- Rose Valley Glacier
- Sea Lion Glacier
- Sopot Ice Piedmont
- Srebarna Glacier
- Strandzha Glacier
- Struma Glacier
- Tundzha Glacier
- Urdoviza Glacier
- Verila Glacier

== Smith Island ==
- Armira Glacier
- Bistra Glacier
- Chuprene Glacier
- Dalgopol Glacier
- Dragoman Glacier
- Gramada Glacier
- Kongur Glacier
- Krivodol Glacier
- Landreth Glacier
- Letnitsa Glacier
- Nosei Glacier
- Ovech Glacier
- Pashuk Glacier
- Ritya Glacier
- Rupite Glacier
- Saparevo Glacier
- Vetrino Glacier
- Yablanitsa Glacier
