= Platt Cliffs =

Platt Cliffs (62°11′S 58°35′W) is a set of cliffs rising to about 100 m between Goulden Cove and Monsimet Cove in Ezcurra Inlet, Admiralty Bay, King George Island. Named by the United Kingdom Antarctic Place-Names Committee (UK-APC) after Eric Platt (1926–48), Falkland Islands Dependencies Survey (FIDS) base leader and geologist, Admiralty Bay, 1948. Platt died from exhaustion and exposure near Ternyck Needle, November 8, 1948, and is buried near the British station on Keller Peninsula.
