= Goetel Glacier =

Glacier in Antarctica

- Map of King George Island

- Location within South Shetland Islands Location within Antarctica
- Location: King George Island; South Shetland Islands
- Coordinates: 62°04′00″S 58°19′00″W
- Thickness: unknown
- Terminus: Martel Inlet
- Status: unknown

Goetel Glacier (62°4′S 58°19′W) is a glacier flowing south between Ullmann Spur and the Precious Peaks into Martel Inlet, Admiralty Bay, on King George Island in the South Shetland Islands. It was named by the Polish Antarctic Expedition, 1980, after Professor Walery Goetel (1889–1972), a Polish geologist and conservationist.

== See also ==
- List of glaciers in the Antarctic
- Glaciology
