= Uplaz =

Ridge in the South Shetland Islands

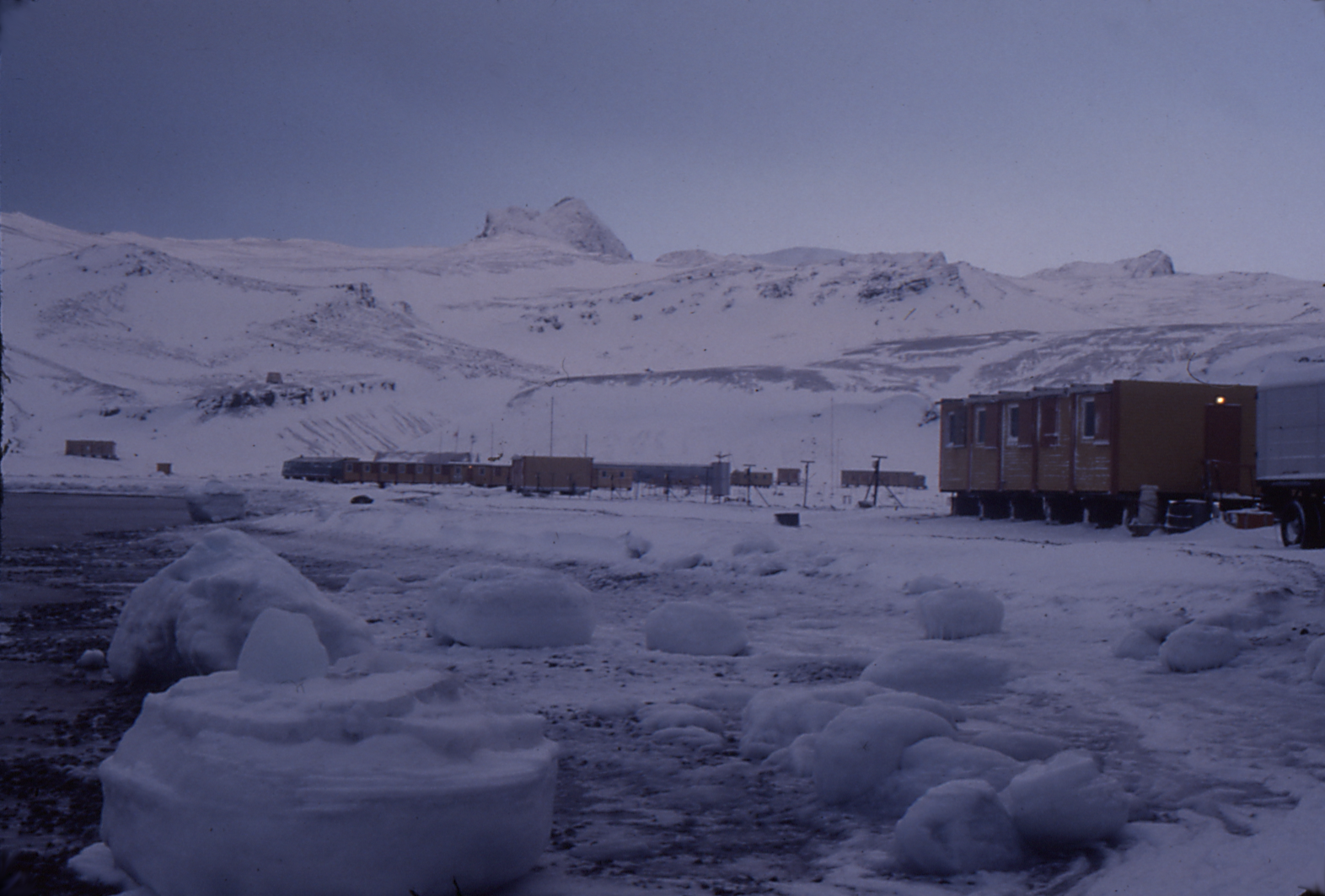
- Uplaz as seen from the Henryk Arctowski Polish Antarctic Station in 1984.

Highest point
- Elevation: 4 m (13 ft)
- Coordinates: 62°09′40″S 58°28′20″W

Geography
- Location within South Shetland Islands Location within Antarctica
- Location: King George Island

Uplaz (Polish: Upłaz) is a ridge on the King George Island, in the archipelago of the South Shetland Islands. It is located near the shore of Admiralty Bay, to the southwest of Jasnorzewski Gardens meadow and the Henryk Arctowski Polish Antarctic Station. Its peak is 4 m (13.1 ft) above mean sea level.

== Name ==
It was named Upłaz in 1980 by the scientists of the Polish expedition. It was named after upłaz, a Polish-language term for a flat or shallow, grassy part of a slope, after such formations present in the Tatra Mountains in southern Poland. In English, the name was anglinised to Uplaz.
