= Noble Glacier =

Glacier in Antarctica

- Map of King George Island

- Location within South Shetland Islands Location within Antarctica
- Location: King George Island; South Shetland Islands
- Coordinates: 62°04′00″S 58°26′00″W
- Thickness: unknown
- Status: unknown

Noble Glacier (62°4′S 58°26′W) is a small glacier lying just north of Flagstaff Glacier on the east side of Keller Peninsula, King George Island, in the South Shetland Islands. Named by the United Kingdom Antarctic Place-Names Committee (UK-APC) in 1960 for Hugh M. Noble of Falkland Islands Dependencies Survey (FIDS), glaciologist at Admiralty Bay in 1957, who made detailed studies of the regime of Flagstaff and Stenhouse Glacier.

== See also ==
- List of glaciers in the Antarctic
- Glaciology
