= Ajax Icefall =

Icefall in Antarctica

Ajax Icefall' (62°4′S 58°23′W) is an icefall between Stenhouse Bluff and Ullmann Spur at the head of Visca Anchorage, King George Island, in the South Shetland Islands. Charted by the French Antarctic Expedition under Jean-Baptiste Charcot in 1908–10. Named by the United Kingdom Antarctic Place-Names Committee in 1960 for HMS Ajax, which assisted in the search for a boat crew from the Discovery II, missing on King George Island in January 1937.
