= Klekowski Crag =

Rock crag in the South Shetland Islands

Klekowski Crag (62°8′S 58°30′W) is a rock crag rising to about 400 metres (1,300 ft) on the south side of Lange Glacier, Admiralty Bay, King George Island, in the South Shetland Islands. It was named by the Polish Antarctic Expedition in 1979 after Professor Romuald Klekowski, Director of the Institute of Ecology, Polish Academy of Sciences, which sponsored Arctowski Station on King George Island.
