= Wegger Peak =

Mountain in King George Island, South Shetland Islands, Antarctica

Wegger Peak (62°6′S 58°31′W) is a peak, 305 m, at the west side of the entrance to Mackellar Inlet, Admiralty Bay, on King George Island in the South Shetland Islands. The name "Le Poing" (The Fist) was given to an elevation hereabout by the French Antarctic Expedition under Charcot in 1908–10. Although Charcot's map shows a single summit, there are four in the vicinity and a question arose over which was named. In 1958 it was suggested by Falkland Islands Dependencies Survey (FIDS) members that the name referred to all four; together they resemble the knuckles of a clenched fist when viewed from the Chabrier Rock area. However, the United Kingdom Antarctic Place-Names Committee (UK-APC) considered the collective name to be unsuitable and it was rejected. New names were recommended by the UK-APC in 1960 for the feature here described and nearby Admiralen Peak. Wegger Peak is named for Ole Wegger (1859–1936), director for 47 years of Framnaes Mekaniske Vaeksted, Norway, shipbuilders who fitted the Admiralen with a slipway for whaling.
