= Gdynia Point =

Gdynia Point (62°10′S 58°33′W) is the eastern point of Dufayel Island, lying in Ezcurra Inlet, Admiralty Bay, King George Island, in the South Shetland Islands. It was named in 1979 by the Polish Antarctic Expedition after Gdynia, Poland, a port city on the Baltic Sea.
