= Halfmoon Cove =

Cove on King George Island, South Shetland Islands

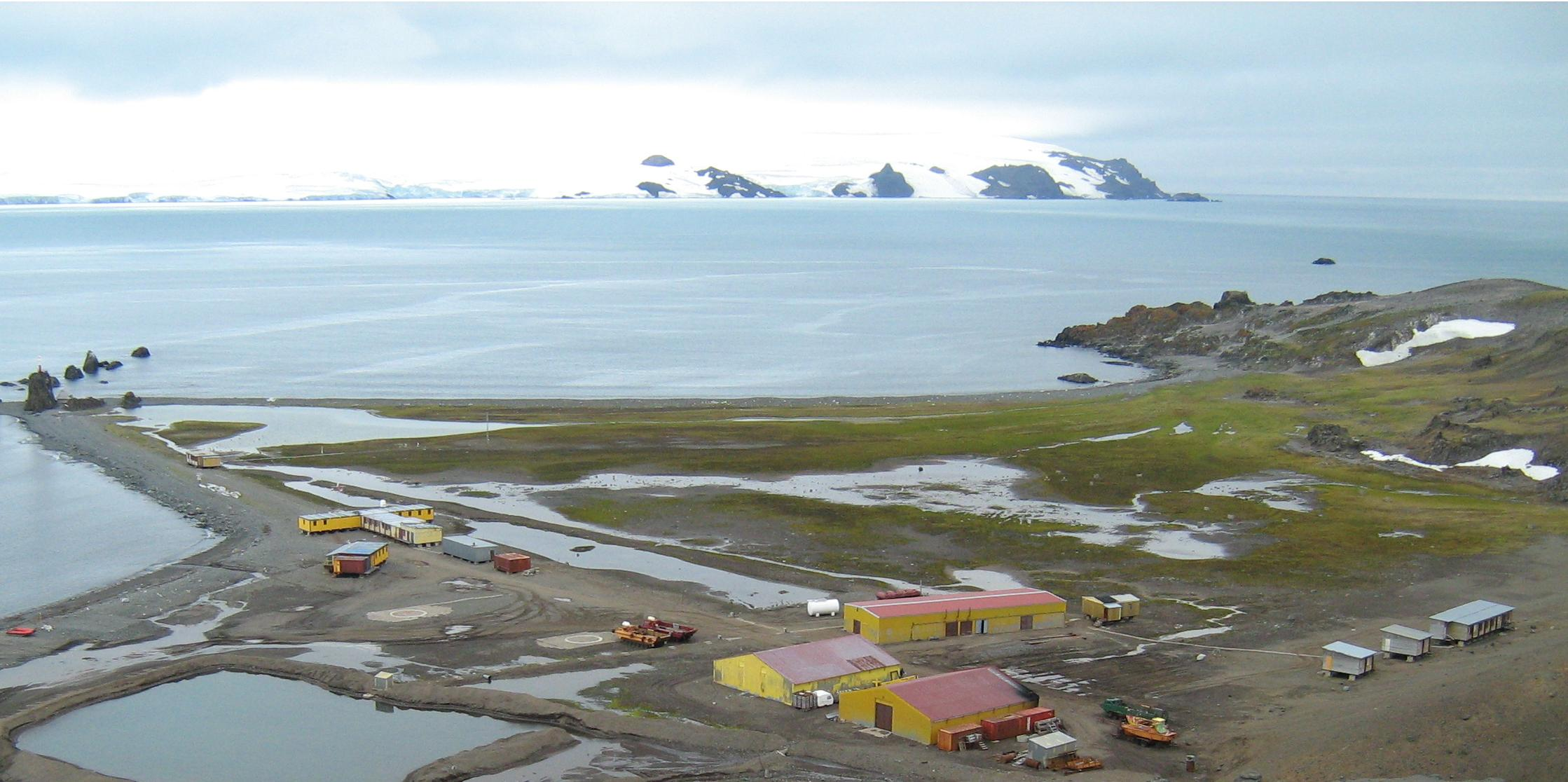
- The coast of the Halfmoon Cove, and the Henryk Arctowski Polish Antarctic Station, in 2008.

Highest point
- Coordinates: 62°09′00″S 58°28′30″W

Geography
- Location within South Shetland Islands Location within Antarctica
- Location: King George Island

The Halfmoon Cove (Polish: Zatoka Półksiężyca) is a cove in Admiralty Bay, on the coast of King George Island, in the archipelago of the South Shetland Islands. It stretches from Shag Point to Rakusa Point. Alongside the cove is located the Jasnorzewski Gardens meadow, near which is placed the Henryk Arctowski Polish Antarctic Station.

== Toponymy ==
It was named Halfmoon Cove (Polish: Zatoka Półksiężyca), after the semicircle shape of its coast, similar to the first and last quarter lunar phase. The name was introduced in 1977 by Wayne Z. Trivelpiece and Nicholas J. Volkman, ornithologists who resided in the Arctowski station between 1977 and 1978.
