= Anna Glacier =

Glacier in Antarctica

- Map of King George Island

- Location within South Shetland Islands Location within Antarctica
- Location: King George Island; South Shetland Islands
- Coordinates: 62°2′S 58°12′W
- Thickness: unknown
- Terminus: King George Bay
- Status: unknown

Anna Glacier (62°2′S 58°12′W) is a glacier flowing southeast between Rose Peak and Rea Peak, tributary to Polonia Glacier/Polonia Ice Piedmont at the head of King George Bay, King George Island. It was named by the Polish Antarctic Expedition (PAE), 1981, after Anna Tokarska, field assistant of PAE geological party to King George Island, 1979–80, and wife of Antoni K. Tokarski.

== See also ==
- List of glaciers in the Antarctic
- Glaciology
