= O'Connors Rock =

O'Connors Rock (62°5′S 58°24′W) is a rock 0.1 nautical miles (0.2 km) southwest of Stenhouse Bluff, King George Island, lying in Visca Anchorage in the north part of Admiralty Bay, in the South Shetland Islands. First charted by the French Antarctic Expedition, 1908–10, under Charcot. The name "O'Connor's Rock" was first used for this feature on a British chart and is probably after Midshipman W. P. O'Connor, Royal Navy Reserve, who assisted in a sketch survey of Visca Anchorage in the Discovery in 1927.
