= Domeyko Glacier =

Glacier in Antarctica

- Map of King George Island

- Location within South Shetland Islands Location within Antarctica
- Location: King George Island; South Shetland Islands
- Coordinates: 62°04′00″S 58°27′0″W
- Thickness: unknown
- Terminus: Mackellar Inlet
- Status: unknown

Domeyko Glacier is a glacier flowing southeast into Mackellar Inlet, Admiralty Bay, King George Island, in the South Shetland Islands. It was named by the Polish Antarctic Expedition, 1980, after Ignacy Domeyko, a Polish-born explorer of the Andes and sometime Professor of Chemistry and Mineralogy, and Rector, of the University of Chile, Santiago. The Cordillera Domeyko, mountain range of the Andes, is also named for the explorer.

== See also ==
- List of glaciers in the Antarctic
- Glaciology
