= Eastern Litwin Bay Important Bird Area =

Important Bird Area of Antarctica

Coordinates: 61°59′04″S 58°33′26″W

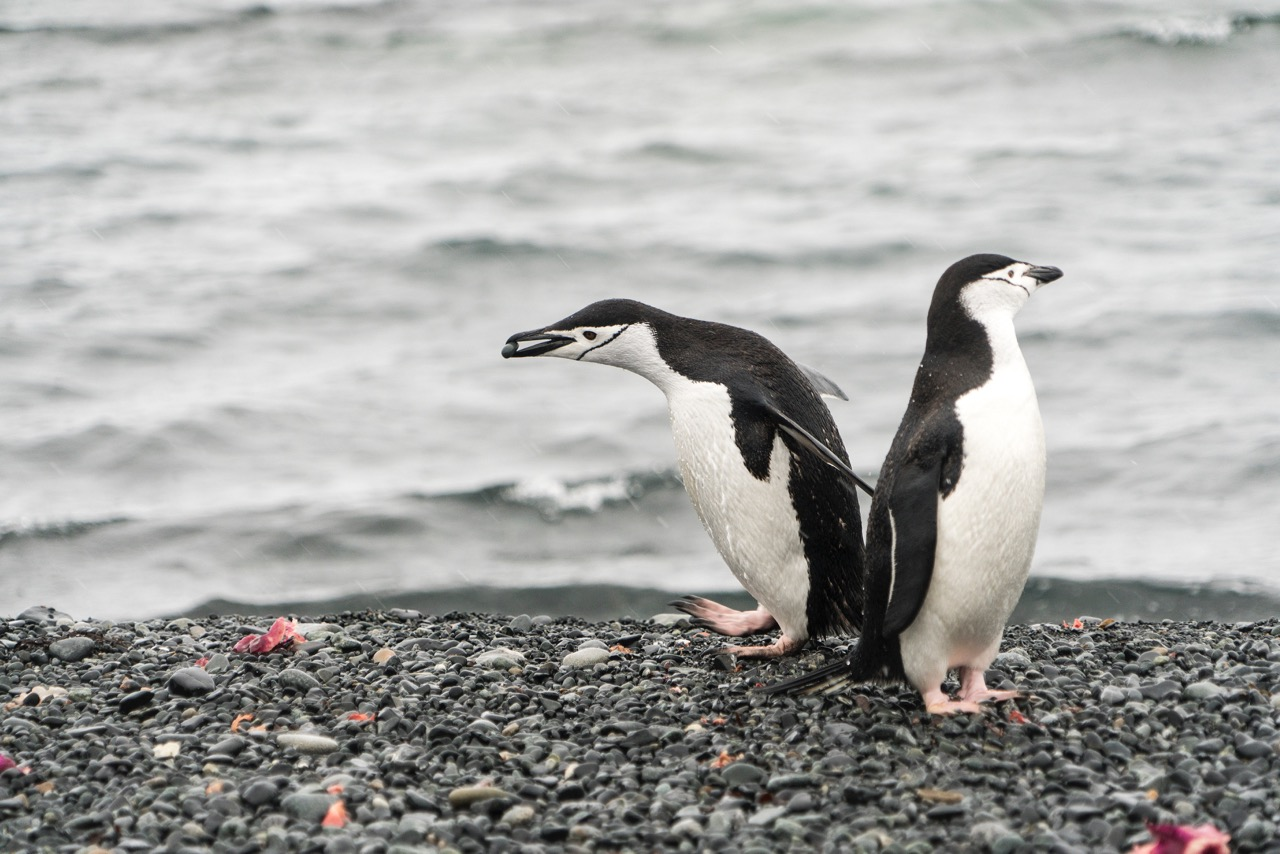
Chinstrap penguins breed in the IBA

The Eastern Litwin Bay Important Bird Area lies between Stigant Point and Davey Point on the northern coast of King George Island in the South Shetland Islands of Antarctica. Here a 500 ha Important Bird Area (IBA) has been designated by BirdLife International because it supports breeding seabirds, notably large numbers of chinstrap penguins with counts of 8,500 to 12,500 breeding pairs made in the area. The site comprises islets in Litwin Bay, the adjacent coast of King George Island and the intervening sea.
