= Rakusa Point =

Geographical feature in Antarctica

Coordinates: 62°10′S 58°28′W

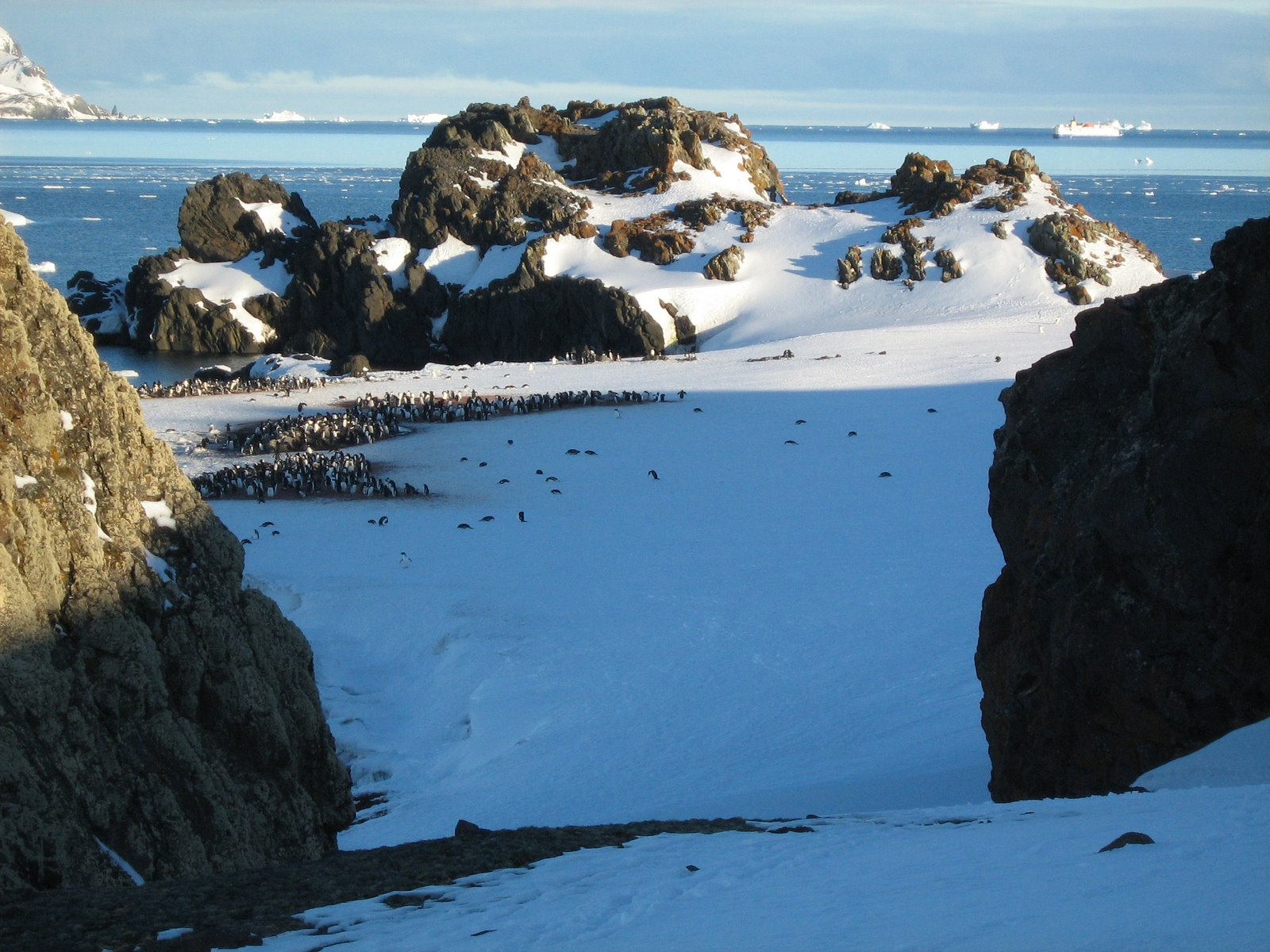
Rakusa Point

Rakusa Point is a point 0.5 nautical miles (0.9 km) southeast of Point Thomas, Admiralty Bay, on King George Island, South Shetland Islands. Named by the Polish Antarctic Expedition in 1977 after Stanislaw Rakusa-Suszczewski, who established Poland's Arctowski Station near this point, February 26, 1977.
