= Bell Point =

Rocky headland in the South Shetland Islands of Antarctica

Bell Point (62°7′S 58°53′W) is a rocky headland lying 11 km (7 mi) southwest of Stigant Point near the western end of King George Island, in the South Shetland Islands of Antarctica. It was charted, and named "Rocky Point", by Discovery Investigations personnel on the Discovery II in 1935; in order to avoid duplication, the name was rejected by the UK Antarctic Place-Names Committee in 1960 and a new one substituted. Bell Point is named for Dennis R. Bell (1934–59), a Falkland Islands Dependencies Survey meteorological assistant at Admiralty Bay from 1958 to July 26, 1959, when he lost his life in a crevasse.
