= Dalmor Bank =

- Submerged bank Dalmor Bank (Antarctica)
- Interactive map of Dalmor Bank
- Ocean: Southern Ocean

Dalmor Bank (62°10′S 58°32′W) is a submarine bank with a least depth of about 80 metres (260 ft), lying off the east end of Dufayel Island in Ezcurra Inlet, King George Island. It was named by the Polish Antarctic Expedition after the expedition ship Dalmor, which first used the bank in 1977 as the best anchorage in the inlet.
