= Ecology Glacier =

Glacier in Antarctica

- Map of King George Island

- Location within South Shetland Islands Location within Antarctica
- Location: King George Island; South Shetland Islands
- Coordinates: 62°11′00″S 58°28′00″W
- Thickness: unknown
- Terminus: Admiralty Bay (South Shetland Islands)
- Status: unknown

Ecology Glacier is a glacier flowing northeast into Admiralty Bay, King George Island, north of Llano Point. It was named by the Polish Antarctic Expedition, 1980, after the Institute of Ecology of the Polish Academy of Sciences, the sponsor of nearby Arctowski Station.

== See also ==
- List of glaciers in the Antarctic
- Glaciology
