= Emerald Icefalls =

Icefalls in the South Shetland Islands

The Emerald Icefalls (62°9′S 58°34′W) are icefalls along the north side of Ezcurra Inlet, Admiralty Bay, King George Island, in the South Shetland Islands. They were so named by the Polish Antarctic Expedition, in 1980, from the color of the serac.
