= Dennis R. Bell =

British meteorologist (1934–1959)

- Born: 15 July 1934; Harrow, London, England
- Died: 26 July 1959 (aged 25); King George Island
- Occupation: Meteorologist
- Employer: Falkland Islands Dependencies Survey

Dennis R. "Tink" Bell (15 July 1934 – 26 July 1959) was a British meteorologist who worked for the then Falkland Islands Dependencies Survey (FIDS). He accidentally fell and died in a crevasse at King George Island while on an Antarctica mission in 1959, though his remains were not recovered until 2025.

== Early life and career ==
Dennis Bell, who was also known as Dennis Tink Bell, was born in 1934 and was the oldest of three siblings. He obtained his secondary school education from Harrow County School for Boys. After high school, he joined the Royal Air Force for National Service where he received training as a radio operator. In 1958, he joined FIDS as a meteorologist and his initial posting was a two-year term at Admiralty Bay, a small United Kingdom research base staffed by about six people, located on King George Island in the South Shetland Islands, approximately 120 kilometres off the northern coast of the Antarctic Peninsula.

== Death ==
On 26 July 1959, Bell, accompanied by three colleagues and two dog sledges, departed from the base to ascend a glacier for survey and geological work. While climbing, the party crossed a crevassed section covered in deep, soft snow, which made progress difficult and caused fatigue among the dogs, according to the British Antarctic Survey. Bell proceeded ahead without skis to encourage the group, but fell through a snow bridge over a crevasse.

Former British Antarctic Survey director Sir Vivian Fuchs recounted the incident in his book Of Ice and Men. He wrote that Bell's colleague, Stokes, called down and received a reply before lowering a rope about 30 metres. Bell secured the rope to his belt, and Stokes attached the other end to the sled dogs to assist with hauling. As Bell neared the surface, his body became wedged against the edge, the belt broke, and he fell back into the crevasse.

Stokes descended the glacier and encountered meteorologist Ken Gibson and geologist Colin Barton heading upward. The three attempted to return to the crevasse, but worsening weather prevented them from reaching it immediately. According to Gibson, they arrived at the site roughly 12 hours later, by which time survival was considered impossible and his body was not recovered.

== Remains discovery ==
Bell's remains were not discovered until 19 January 2025, 66 years after his demise. The remains, revealed due to melting glaciers, were discovered by a team from the Henryk Arctowski Polish Antarctic Station. The bone fragments were transported to the Falkland Islands aboard the British Antarctic Survey's research vessel Sir David Attenborough and subsequently taken to London for DNA analysis which revealed the owner. Alongside the remains, the Polish team recovered more than 200 personal effects, including radio equipment, a flashlight, ski poles, an inscribed wristwatch, and a Swedish-made knife.

== Legacy ==
Bell Point on King George Island was named after him in his honour.

== See also ==
- List of solved missing person cases (1950–1969)
