= Krak Glacier =

Glacier in Antarctica

- Map of King George Island

- Location within South Shetland Islands Location within Antarctica
- Type: outlet
- Location: King George Island; South Shetland Islands
- Coordinates: 62°06′00″S 58°20′00″W
- Thickness: unknown
- Terminus: Martel Inlet
- Status: unknown

Krak Glacier (62°6′S 58°20′W) is an outlet glacier of Kraków Dome at the head of Lussich Cove, Martel Inlet, Admiralty Bay, King George Island, in the South Shetland Islands.It was named by the Polish Antarctic Expedition, 1980, after the legendary prince Krak, founder of Kraków and killer of the Wawel Dragon.

== See also ==
- List of glaciers in the Antarctic
- Glaciology
