= Fourcade =

Fourcade may refer to:

== Art ==
- Denning & Fourcade, Inc., French interior design firm

== Geography ==
- Fourcade Glacier, glacier at the head of Potter Cove, Maxwell Bay, King George Island
- Mount Fourcade, mountain standing 2 nautical miles (3.7 km) southwest of Cape Anna and Anna Cove on the west coast of Graham Land

== People ==
- Fourcade (surname), a surname

== See also ==
- Lafourcade, a related surname
