= Jasnorzewski Gardens =

Meadow on coast of Antarctic Ocean

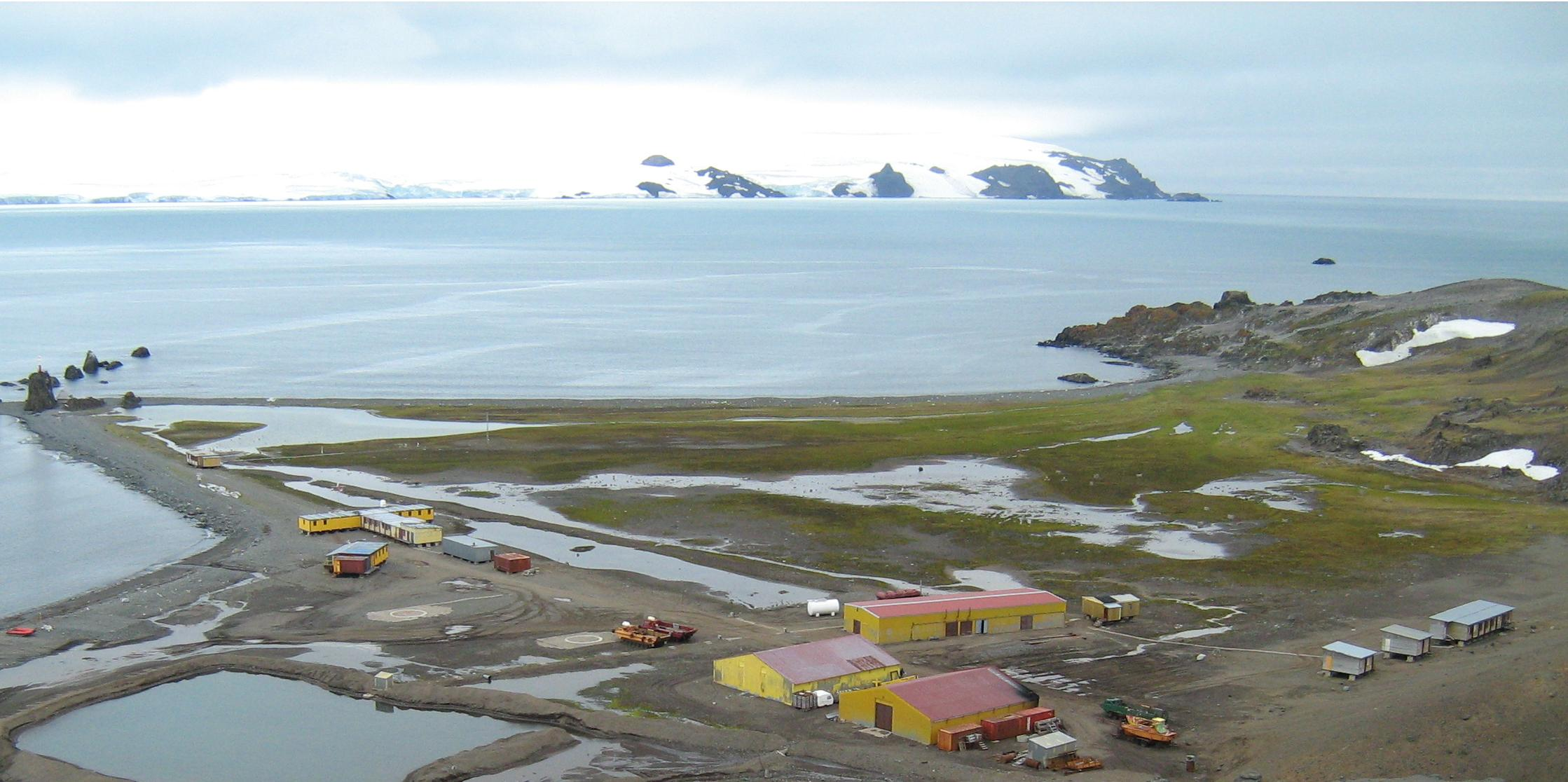
- Jasnorzewski Gardens, with the Henryk Arctowski Polish Antarctic Station, in 2008.

Highest point
- Coordinates: 62°09′00″S 58°28′30″W

Geography
- Location within South Shetland Islands Location within Antarctica
- Location: King George Island

Jasnorzewski Gardens (Polish pronunciation: [jas.nɔˈʐɛf.ski]; Polish: Ogrody Jasnorzewskiego) is a coastal meadow on King George Island, in the archipelago of the South Shetland Islands. It is located on the shore of Halfmoon Cove, which is part of Admiralty Bay. Next to the meadow is located the Henryk Arctowski Polish Antarctic Station.

== Name ==
Jasnorzewski Gardens (Polish: Ogrody Jasnorzewskiego) was established in 1980, by the members of Polish Arctic expedition. It was named after Jerzy Lech Jasnorzewski, a geodesist and astronomer, who took part in the Arctic expeditions from 1967 to 1958, and in an Antarctic expedition from 1977 to 1979.

== Gallery ==
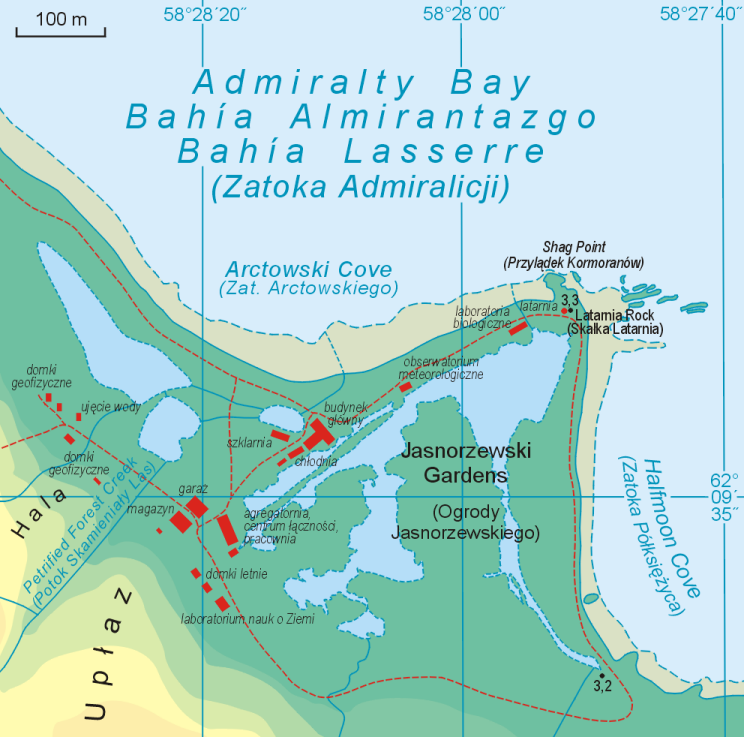
The map of the Henryk Arctowski Polish Antarctic Station and its surroundings, including the coast of the Halfmoon Cove.
