= Precious Peaks =

Mountain in King George Island, South Shetland Islands, Antarctica

Precious Peaks (62°4′S 58°20′W) is a line of about three dark peaks at the northeast side of Martel Inlet, Admiralty Bay, on King George Island in the South Shetland Islands. Charted by the French Antarctic Expedition under Charcot, 1908–10. Named by the United Kingdom Antarctic Place-Names Committee (UK-APC) in 1960 for Alan Precious of Falkland Islands Dependencies Survey (FIDS), meteorological observer at Hope Bay in 1954 and 1955, and leader at the Admiralty Bay station in 1957.
