= HMS Ajax (22) =

Leander-class cruiser

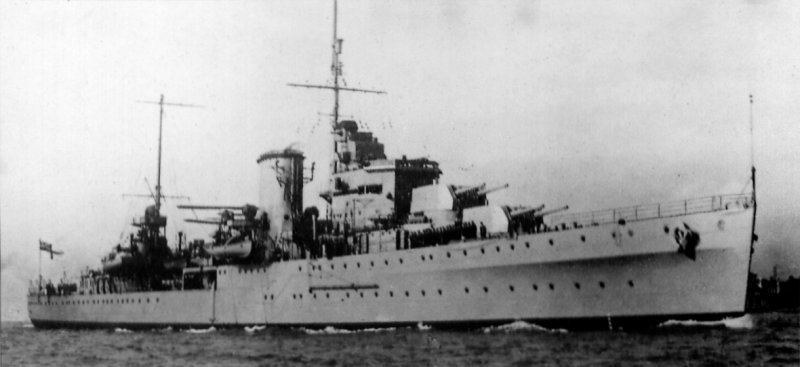

History

United Kingdom
- Name: HMS Ajax
- Builder: Vickers Armstrong, Barrow-in-Furness
- Cost: £1.48 million
- Laid down: 7 February 1933
- Launched: 1 March 1934
- Commissioned: 3 June 1935
- Recommissioned: 11 January 1938
- Decommissioned: February 1948
- Identification: Pennant number: 22
- Motto: Nec Quisquam Nisi Ajax (Latin: "None but Ajax [can overcome Ajax]")
- Fate: Scrapped in 1949

General characteristics
- Class & type: Leander-class light cruiser
- Displacement: 7,270 tons standard; 9,740 tons full load
- Length: 554.9 ft (169.1 m)
- Beam: 56 ft (17 m)
- Draught: 19.1 ft (5.8 m)
- Installed power: 72,000 shaft horsepower (54,000 kW)
- Propulsion: Four Parsons geared steam turbines; Six Admiralty 3-drum oil-fired boilers; Four shafts
- Speed: 32.5 knots (60 km/h)
- Range: 5,730 nmi (10,610 km; 6,590 mi) at 13 knots (24 km/h; 15 mph)
- Complement: peacetime 550; wartime 680
- Sensors & processing systems: type 284/286 air search radar; type 273/271 surface search; type 285 6 inch (152 mm) fire control; type 282 40 mm fire control
- Armament: Original configuration: 8 (4x2) BL 6-inch (150 mm) Mk XXIII guns; 4 × QF 4-inch (100 mm) Mk V guns; 12 × Vickers .50 machine guns; 8 × 21-inch (530 mm) torpedo tubes; By 1945: 8 (4x2) 6 in (152 mm); 8 (4x2) QF 4-inch (100 mm) Mk XVI guns; 16 × 40 mm Bofors guns; 8 × 21 in (533 mm) torpedo tubes (quadruple mounts)
- Armour: 4 in (102 mm) main belt; 2.5 in (64 mm) ends; 1.25 to 2 in (32 to 51 mm) deck; 1 in (25 mm) turrets
- Aircraft carried: One catapult-launched Fairey Seafox, replaced by a Supermarine Walrus

Service record
- Operations: River Plate 1939; Mediterranean 1940–41; Cape Matapan 1941; Greece 1941; Crete 1941; Malta Convoys 1941; Aegean 1944; Normandy 1944; South France 1944

HMS Ajax was a Leander-class light cruiser which served with the Royal Navy during World War II. She became famous for her part in the Battle of the River Plate, the Battle of Crete, the Battle of Malta and as a supply escort in the siege of Tobruk. This ship was the eighth in the Royal Navy to bear the name. In February 1942, she was adopted by the civil community of Halifax, West Yorkshire.

== Pre-war and first actions ==
Ajax was built at Vickers' shipyard, in Barrow-in-Furness, England. She was laid down on 7 February 1933, launched on 1 March 1934 and completed on 12 April 1935.

She was commissioned for service with the 8th Cruiser Squadron on the America and West Indies Station, but after working up in May 1935, she was deployed instead to the Mediterranean on detached service after the Abyssinian crisis. This lasted until November, when she finally joined her squadron at its base at the Royal Naval Dockyard in the Imperial fortress colony of Bermuda. Until 1937 she undertook exercises and visits to ports in the Americas as part of the station's South America Division. South American waters, as well as the geographic extent of the former Pacific Station, had been added to the expanse controlled from Bermuda after the First World War (by the same manner in which the Newfoundland Station and Jamaica Station had been absorbed into the North America Station in 1825 and 1830, respectively), requiring the augmentation of the 8th Cruiser Squadron (beginning with the transfer to the station of HMS Dauntless from the Mediterranean in May, 1928). Although Ajax and HMS Exeter operated from Bermuda, in the North Atlantic, they spent much of the year cruising South American waters before returning to Bermuda for maintenance and to exercise with the squadron. Ajax took part in the December 1936 reburials at Punta Arenas of the dead of HMS Doterel, killed in the explosion of a magazine in 1881. At the end of her America and West Indies deployment, Ajax returned to Britain for refit. At this time, her 4" battery was upgraded by exchanging single for double mountings.

On 2 and 3 June 1937, Ajax and other ships of the squadron took part in combined exercises with the Bermuda Garrison to practice raiding a hostile shore. "Blue Land Force" (Headquarters, "B" Company, 1st Sherwood Foresters, a company of Royal Marines, a Royal Navy howitzer battery and a naval demolition party), commanded by Major John R. Chidlaw-Roberts, Sherwood Foresters (with its boats guided by members of the Royal Bermuda Yacht Club), was landed from Ajax before sunrise at Spanish Point, Bermuda, with the objective of moving overland to attack an imaginary fuel dump at Admiralty House, supported by fire from Ajax, Exeter and other vessels, as well as by naval aircraft. The defending force included patrol boats manned by the Royal Naval Volunteer Reserve and "Red Land Force" (three battalions, represented by a platoon of the Bermuda Volunteer Rifle Corps).

Sir Arthur George Murchison Fletcher, the Governor of Trinidad signalled the Commander-in-Chief in Bermuda on 20 June 1937 for a cruiser to be sent to that colony due to riots that had broken out among strikers in the oil fields of Apex and Fyzabad, which had included the killings of two police officers. Workers in other industries had also staged sympathy strikes. Ajax, which was at Nassau at the time, was ordered to Trinidad. Exeter, which was about to depart Bermuda for the Panama Canal, was also ordered to Trinidad on 21 June. Ajax landed platoons of seamen and marines from her crew to support the civil police in re-establishing order. On 2 July, the marines of Ajax joined with those of Exeter and 200 police constables to assault the village of Fyzabad. By 5 July, the situation in Trinidad had returned largely to normal. Ajax departed Trinidad, and the America and West Indies Station on 14 July 1937 for Her Majesty's Dockyard, Portsmouth, to pay off and refit.

She rejoined her squadron in America and the West Indies in February 1938 and remained in the Atlantic until 1939, when she was redeployed to the Pacific, off South America. On 27 January, Ajax went to assist the rescue of earthquake victims at Talcahuano, Chile. She then returned to Bermuda and was redeployed to the South Atlantic Division in March.

When war was declared in September 1939, Ajax took up her appropriate station and patrolled off the River Plate. There she sank the German merchant ship Olinda on 3 September. She intercepted the German merchantman Carl Fritzen and the passenger ship Ussukuma (with the cruiser HMS Cumberland) on 4 and 5 September, respectively. Both ships were scuttled by their crews to avoid being taken as prizes.

After a brief deployment in and around the Falkland Islands, Ajax returned to her station off the Plate on 21 September.

== The hunt for Admiral Graf Spee ==
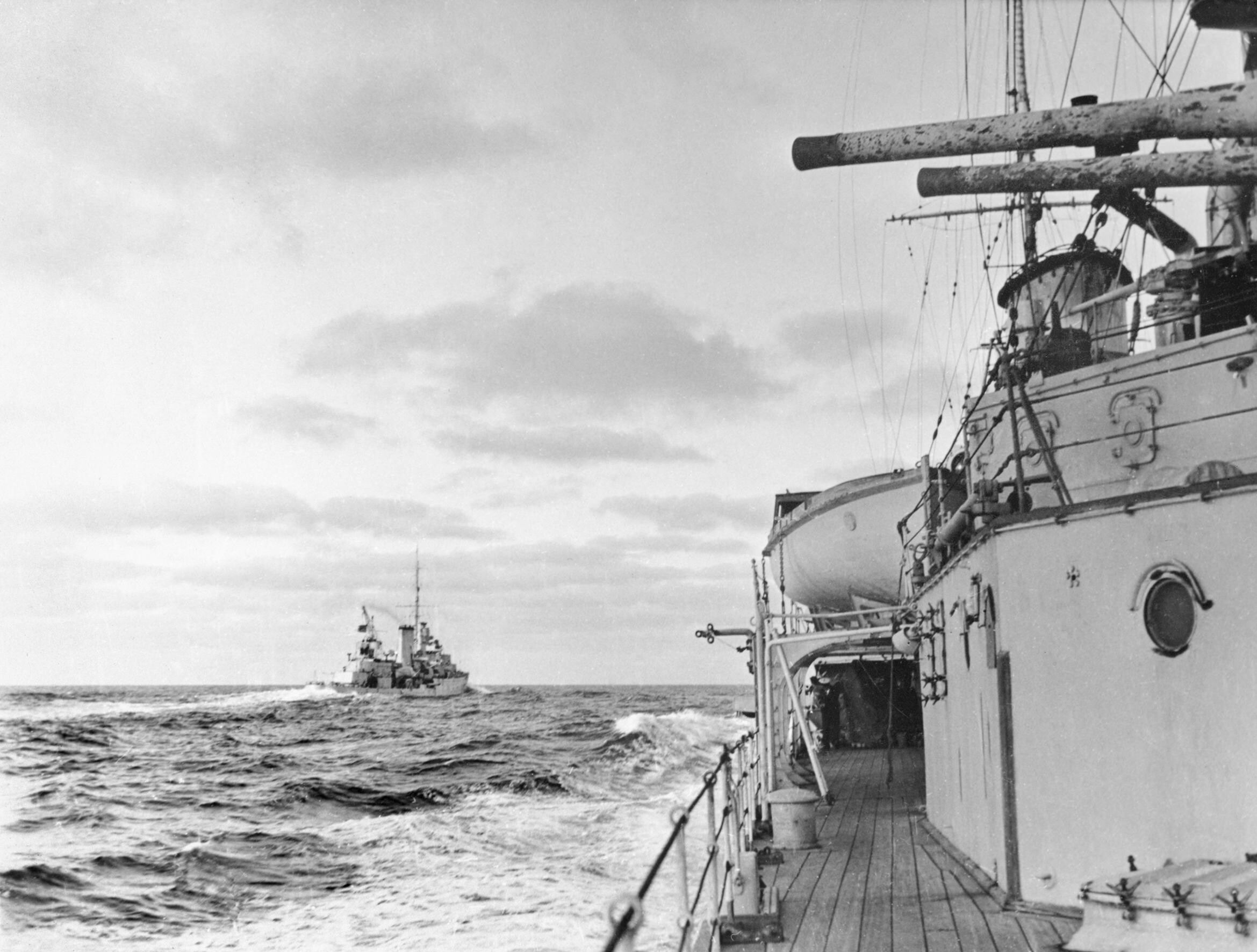
HMS Achilles seen from Ajax during the Battle of the River Plate

When the German raider, Admiral Graf Spee, became a threat, Force G was formed from Ajax (flagship, Commodore Henry Harwood), Exeter and Achilles, all cruisers.(Cumberland, also part of this force, was undergoing a refit at Port Stanley). Force G located and engaged Graf Spee on 13 December, despite the German warship's greater firepower. Ajax was hit seven times by the Germans: X and Y turrets were disabled, structural damage was sustained and there were 12 casualties including 7 killed. Exeter, more severely damaged, retired, leaving the two light cruisers to maintain contact with Graf Spee when she withdrew to Montevideo. The reasons for the German ship's withdrawal and her failure to exploit her advantage are unclear, but there was damage to her bow, that affected her sea-worthiness, and to her fuel systems. Ajax and Achilles, joined by Cumberland, awaited events and successfully bluffed the Germans into believing that a superior force was on hand. Graf Spee was scuttled by her own crew. Ajax refuelled at Port Stanley and resumed her patrol.

In January 1940, she returned to Britain for refit, via Montevideo, Rio de Janeiro and Freetown, Sierra Leone. She was joined en route by the aircraft carrier Ark Royal, the battlecruiser Renown and the destroyers Hasty, Hero, Dainty and Diamond. Ajax arrived at Plymouth at the end of January; the following month, she was handed over to Chatham Dockyard for refit.

== Mediterranean, Crete and North Africa ==
Once refitted and worked up, Ajax became ready for service in August 1940. Her refit had included the addition of a Type 279 radar, a tripod mast and zarebas (Note: Zarebas" are breakwater-like structures on ships, intended to deflect sea-water off the deck and away from exposed installations.) for the 4" batteries.

In August 1940, Ajax was allocated to the 7th Cruiser Squadron for Mediterranean service (France had fallen and Italy was now a belligerent with a significant navy). She sailed from Britain on 21 August as part of the escort (with York), of a convoy for Egypt routed via the Mediterranean (Operation Hats), but she remained with a portion that was diverted via Durban. In late September, she escorted a troop convoy (Empress of Japan, Orion and Oronsay) from Aden to Suez. Ajax joined HMAS Sydney at Alexandria on 30 September.

From 2 to 16 October, Ajax was engaged in major fleet manoeuvres to interdict Italian convoys to Libya and to protect British convoys to Malta. Firstly, she sailed with the fleet (Note: Which included the battleships HMS Malaya and Ramillies, the aircraft carrier Eagle, the cruiser Coventry and eight destroyers.) to search for Italian convoys, possibly with their own fleet escorts. On 8 October, Ajax again deployed with a major naval force (Note: The second deployment included battleships HMS Warspite, Valiant, Malaya and Ramillies, aircraft carriers Illustrious and Eagle, cruisers York, Gloucester, Liverpool, Orion and HMAS Sydney with a screen of 16 fleet destroyers.) to cover the passage to Malta of convoy MF3 (Operation MB6). (Note: Convoy MF3 consisted of four ships; Clan Ferguson, Clan Macauley, Lanarkshire and Mermon.) Ajax and Orion patrolled south-east of Malta before covering the return of Convoy MF4 to Alexandria on 12 October. (The main fleet was deployed to the west of the convoy).

During the night of 11–12 October, Ajax intercepted a small Italian force. In a close-range night action (sometimes called the Battle of Cape Passero), two Spica-class torpedo boats, Airone and Ariel, were sunk and the destroyer Artigliere was disabled (later sunk by HMS York). (Note: Sources differ on this action's details. Mason states that several British cruisers and destroyers, including Ajax, were engaged; Thomas states that, although Ajax was one of a cruiser cordon, she "sank two destroyers and damaged a third", without mentioning the involvement of the other British warships.) Two more warships escaped into a smoke screen. Ajax herself was hit by seven shells that destroyed one of her whalers, caused severe damage to the bridge and radar installation and 35 casualties, including 13 killed. She returned to Alexandria on 16 October.

At the end of October, Ajax set out on the first of two operations to carry troop reinforcements to Suda Bay, on Crete in Operation Barbarity; she suffered near misses from air attacks. On her return to the fleet on 6 November, she helped to provide cover for a Malta convoy, MW3. This was a large operation, involving most of the Mediterranean Fleet and part of a wider set of ship movements, Operation Coat. She was part of Force X (Note: Cruisers HMS Orion, Ajax and HMAS Sydney, and destroyers Mohawk and Nubian.) which was detached from the main fleet on 11 November to sortie into the Straits of Otranto, between Italy and Albania, to provide a diversion and give cover for the successful naval air attack on Taranto.

On 12 November, after turning to return to the main fleet, they intercepted a small convoy of four Italian merchant ships escorted by naval auxiliary Ramb III and the obsolete torpedo-boat Nicola Fabrizi. Ramb III fired 19 salvos in its own defense and succeeded in breaking away without suffering any damage. Nicola Fabrizi stayed with the merchant ships and attacked the British forces. As a result, Nicola Fabrizi was hit immediately and suffered serious damage. The Italian torpedo boat continued to fight until it was unable to fight any more and retired badly damaged. After Nicola Fabrizi was neutralized, the British force divided up the targets and sank all four of the Italian merchant ships. This action took place near the Strait of Otranto (see Battle of the Strait of Otranto (1940)).

Force X also bombarded the port of Durazzo (now Durres) and set the oil refinery on fire. before it rejoined the fleet. Ajax and other vessels were detached from the fleet and refuelled at Suda Bay before they returned to Alexandria.

From 15 to 20 November, Ajax and four other cruisers (Note: HMS Gloucester, York, Orion and HMAS Sydney) transported troops from Alexandria to Piraeus, the port of Athens, and returned to Alexandria. On 23 November, she was deployed with Force B (Note: Battleships HMS Malaya and Ramillies, aircraft carrier HMS Eagle, cruisers HMS Berwick, Orion, HMAS Sydney and destroyers) to cover a convoy to Crete and to support air attacks on Tripoli from Eagle.

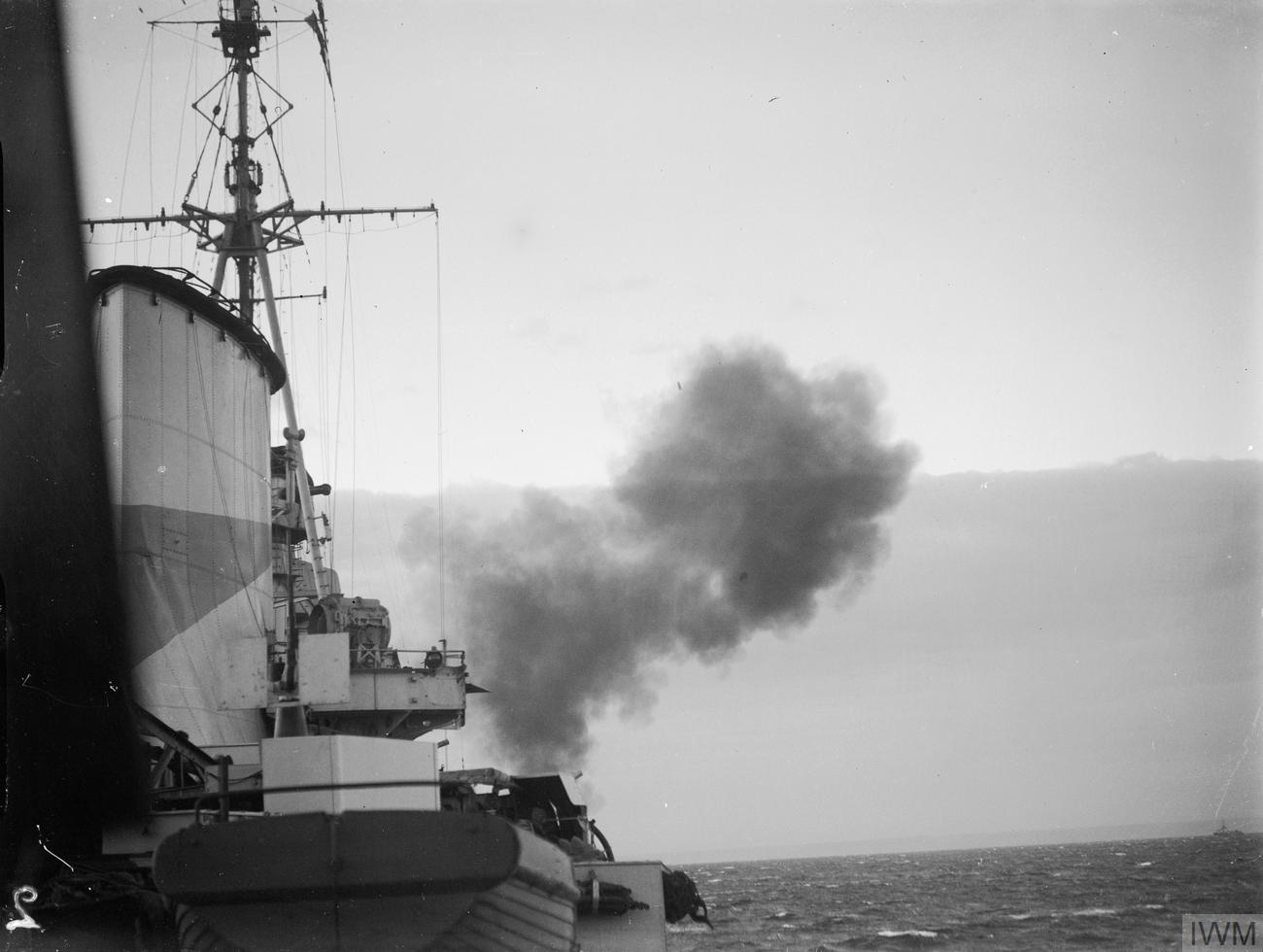
Ajax bombards Bardia in Libya in December 1941

Ajax participated in the Battle of Cape Matapan and was hit by bombs from Ju 87s on 21 May 1941. She evacuated many troops from Crete up until 29 May. She then covered Syrian operations in June and joined Force K at Malta in November, being withdrawn in February 1942 for refit.

== Two years out of action (1942 and 1943) ==
On 6 February Ajax departed Suez for the United Kingdom via the Cape of Good Hope, calling at Mombasa (9 March) and Freetown (9 April), arriving in the Clyde on 14 April. On 6 June, she was taken in hand for refit at Chatham Dockyard, which lasted until September. Her anti-aircraft (AA) gunnery was augmented by eleven Oerlikon 20 mm cannons. Various radar sets were also installed; fire control radars for her main guns (Type 284), AA armament (Type 285) and barrage control (Type 283); an improved aircraft warning radar (the Type 281, replaced the Type 279), surface warning radar was also fitted, (the Type 272). Her aircraft facilities were removed. Ajax underwent post-refit trials in October and after being recommissioned on 24 October, she worked-up at Scapa Flow with the Home Fleet during November. On 31 December, she joined Force Q at Bône, in Algeria for the interdiction of enemy convoys and convoy defence.

Ajax was disabled by a 1,000 lb (450 kg) bomb—dropped by an aircraft from II./SKG 10 or II./StG 3— hitting "B" boiler room on 1 January 1943 while at Bône, after convoy escort duty; she was towed on 7 January to Gibraltar for temporary repairs, which continued into February. Permanent repairs were arranged to take place in the United States and she was taken in hand at Norfolk Navy Yard, Virginia; these lasted until September. During repair work, Ajax was equipped with US quadruple 40 mm anti-aircraft mountings with provision for a British fire control radar Type 282; IFF Type 242 was also fitted, and a US fire control radar replaced her existing Type 284. After post refit trials in October, she returned to Britain, via Bermuda, in November and the fitting of British equipment was completed. Ajax was recommissioned at Portsmouth on 25 December and joined the Home Fleet at Scapa Flow once more for work-up before returning to the Mediterranean in February 1944 after nearly two years out of action – apart from just a couple of days in January 1943.

== D-Day and post-war activities ==
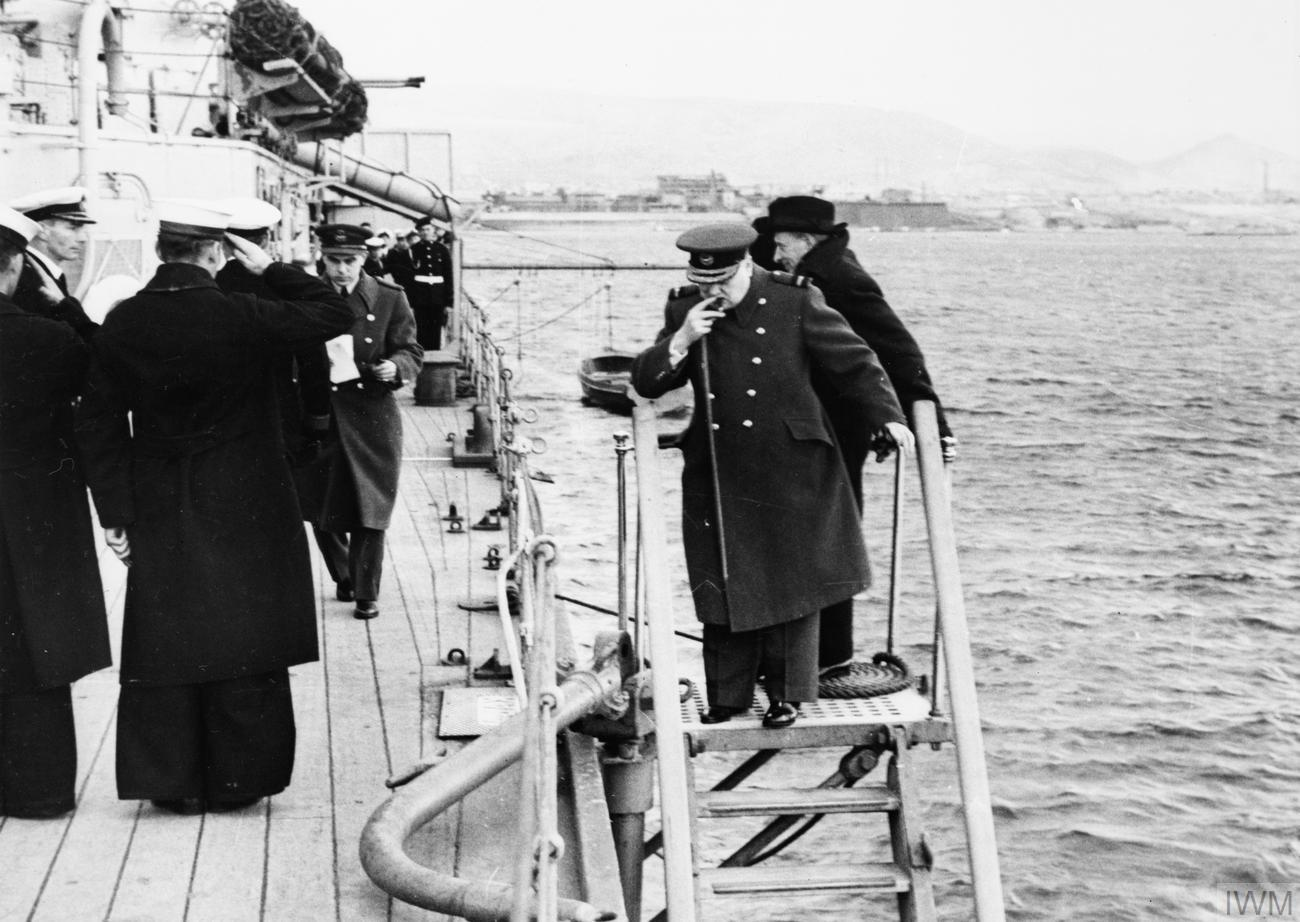
Winston Churchill leaves Ajax to attend a conference in Athens, 28 December 1944. Captain Cuthbert: "I hope, Sir, that while you are with us we shan't have to open fire...if we are asked to give supporting fire I must do so." Winston Churchill: "Pray remember, Captain, that I came here as a cooing dove of peace, bearing a sprig of mistletoe in my beak but far be it from me to stand in the way of military necessity."

As part of Force K, Ajax bombarded Gold Beach during the D-Day invasion; the battery at Longues gave some trouble but was silenced by 6-inch shells through the embrasures of two of the four casemates. She later supported the landings in southern France. Ajax also operated in the Aegean during the reoccupation of Athens and the communist uprising in Greece.

After the war, Ajax was used to repatriate German sailors from the crew of Admiral Graf Spee from Uruguay back to Germany – a historic irony since Ajax had been a member of the squadron that battled the German ship in 1939 and ultimately caused her to be scuttled. Ajax was then assigned to the Royal Navy Palestine Patrol and took part in the efforts to halt illegal Jewish immigration to Palestine. In July 1947 it took part in the Exodus 1947 incident, in which she formed part of the Royal Navy task force which subdued the illegal immigrant ship and later escorted it back to Germany.

== Final disposition ==
Ajax was decommissioned in February 1948. Sales to the Chilean Navy or Indian Navy were mooted, but this latter deal did not materialize due to Winston Churchill's apparent disapproval of the sale; he felt that such an important vessel would be better off broken up to preserve her history. After running aground at Newport, Monmouthshire, on 9 November 1949 while under tow to the scrapyard, she was refloated and duly arrived at Cashmore's, in Newport, South Wales, for breaking up on 18 November 1949.

== Ajax remembered ==
Steve Parish (right), mayor of Ajax, presents a replica of the street sign for Brackenridge Street bearing the silhouette of HMS Ajax to Bill Brackenridge, son of WWII crewmember Able Seaman Thomas Brackenridge (of Glasgow, Scotland) for whom the street was named. 27 May 2008

The town of Ajax, Ontario, Canada, was named after the cruiser following the Battle of the River Plate. The town also has streets named after members of the ship's company, such as Hobson Avenue, and Harwood Avenue, which is the town's main north-south street. Many street signs in the town bear the silhouette of the ship. The silhouette signifies the street being named after part of the ship's company, and the later Frigate HMS Ajax's anchor rests in front of the local branch of the Royal Canadian Legion.

Calle Exeter was named in honor of the ship, after HMS Exeter and HMS Ajax provided assistance to the citizens of Concepción, following the 1939 Chillán earthquake.

Ajax's bell was on a monument in Montevideo, just outside the port customs house, and was donated by Admiral Sir Henry Harwood and Sir Eugen Millington-Drake in 1949. However, it was stolen soon afterwards. The first replacement had 'AJAX' misspelt but the final one is displayed at the Naval Museum in Montevideo.

Ajax Icefall at the head of Visca Anchorage, King George Island, in the South Shetland Islands is named for HMS Ajax, which assisted in the search for a boat crew from the Discovery II, missing on King George Island in January 1937.

== In popular culture ==
The author Warren Tute's service on HMS Ajax during the 1930s formed the background for his novel The Cruiser. Like Ajax, the novel's fictional HMS Antigone was a Leander-class light cruiser which was based on the North America and West Indies Station before World War II and saw action in the Mediterranean. The novel paints a realistic picture of life on a cruiser.
