= Point Thomas =

Geographical feature in Antarctica

Point Thomas (62°10′S 58°30′W) is a point marking the south side of the entrance to Ezcurra Inlet in Admiralty Bay, on King George Island in the South Shetland Islands. It lies less than 1 km northwest of Rakusa Point. Charted by the French Antarctic Expedition, 1908–10, under Charcot, and named by him for a member of the expedition.
