= Wegger =

Wegger is both a given name and a surname.

== Given name ==
- Wegger Christian Strømmen (born 1959), Norwegian diplomat and politician

== Surname ==
- Ole Wegger (1859–1936), Norwegian business executive and politician
- Gunhild Anna Barsleth Wegger (born 1956), Norwegian cultural school teacher
