= Monsimet Cove =

Cove in the South Shetland Islands

Monsimet Cove (62°11′S 58°34′W) is a cove 0.5 nautical miles (1 km) west of Hervé Cove along the south side of Ezcurra Inlet, in Admiralty Bay, King George Island, in the South Shetland Islands. It was first charted by the Fourth French Antarctic Expedition, 1908–10, under Jean-Baptiste Charcot, and named by him for a member of the expedition.
