= Usher Glacier =

Glacier in Antarctica

- Map of King George Island

- Location within South Shetland Islands Location within Antarctica
- Location: King George Island; South Shetland Islands
- Coordinates: 62°02′00″S 58°37′00″W
- Length: 4 nmi (7 km; 5 mi)
- Thickness: unknown
- Terminus: north west of Stigant Point
- Status: unknown

Usher Glacier (62°2′S 58°37′W) is a glacier nearly 4 nautical miles (7 km) long, flowing northwest into the sea between Stigant Point and Davey Point on the north coast of King George Island, in the South Shetland Islands. Named by the United Kingdom Antarctic Place-Names Committee (UK-APC) in 1960 for J. Usher, Master of the Caraquet from Liverpool, who visited the South Shetland Islands in 1821–22.

== See also ==
- List of glaciers in the Antarctic
- Glaciology
