= Crépin Point =

- Location within South Shetland Islands

Highest point
- Coordinates: 62°6′S 58°29′W

Geography
- Location: Admiralty Bay, King George Island

Crépin Point is a point which marks the west side of the entrance to Mackellar Inlet in Admiralty Bay, on King George Island, in the South Shetland Islands. It was charted and named Cap Crépin in 1909 by the French Antarctic Expedition, 1908–10 under Jean-Baptiste Charcot.
