= Polar Club Glacier =

Glacier in Antarctica

- Map of King George Island

- Location within South Shetland Islands Location within Antarctica
- Location: King George Island; South Shetland Islands
- Coordinates: 62°14′00″S 58°32′00″W
- Thickness: unknown
- Terminus: Bransfield Strait
- Status: unknown

Polar Club Glacier (62°14′S 58°32′W) is a broad glacier east-northeast of Stranger Point, King George Island, in Antarctica. South of it is Bransfield Strait. Named by the Polish Antarctic Expedition, 1980, after the Polish Polar Club.

== See also ==
- List of glaciers in the Antarctic
- Glaciology
