= Moby Dick Icefall =

Icefall in the South Shetland Islands near Antarctica

Moby Dick Icefall (61°58′S 57°42′W) is an icefall at the head of Destruction Bay, in the east of King George Island, in the South Shetland Islands. It was named by the Polish Antarctic Expedition of 1981 after the famous white whale of Herman Melville's 1851 novel Moby-Dick.
