= Rose Peak (South Shetlands) =

Mountain in King George Island, Antarctica

Rose Peak (62°2′S 58°12′W) is a peak, 655 m, lying nearly 2 nautical miles (3.7 km) southwest of Rea Peak and 3 nautical miles (6 km) northeast of Ternyck Needle in the central part of King George Island, in the South Shetland Islands. Named by the United Kingdom Antarctic Place-Names Committee (UK-APC) in 1960 for the Enderby Brothers' cutter Rose, tender to the schooner 1833 or January 1834 the Rose was crushed in the pack ice in 6017S, 5326W; her crew were rescued by the Hopeful.
