= Plaza Point =

Coordinates: 62°6′S 58°26′W

Plaza Point is a point forming the south tip of Keller Peninsula, which separates Mackellar and Martel Inlets in the north part of Admiralty Bay, on King George Island, in the South Shetland Islands. Charted and named by the French Antarctic Expedition under Charcot, 1908–10. The name suggests the central position of the feature at the head of Admiralty Bay.
