= Joseph Stenhouse =

British explorer (1887–1941)

Joseph Russell Stenhouse
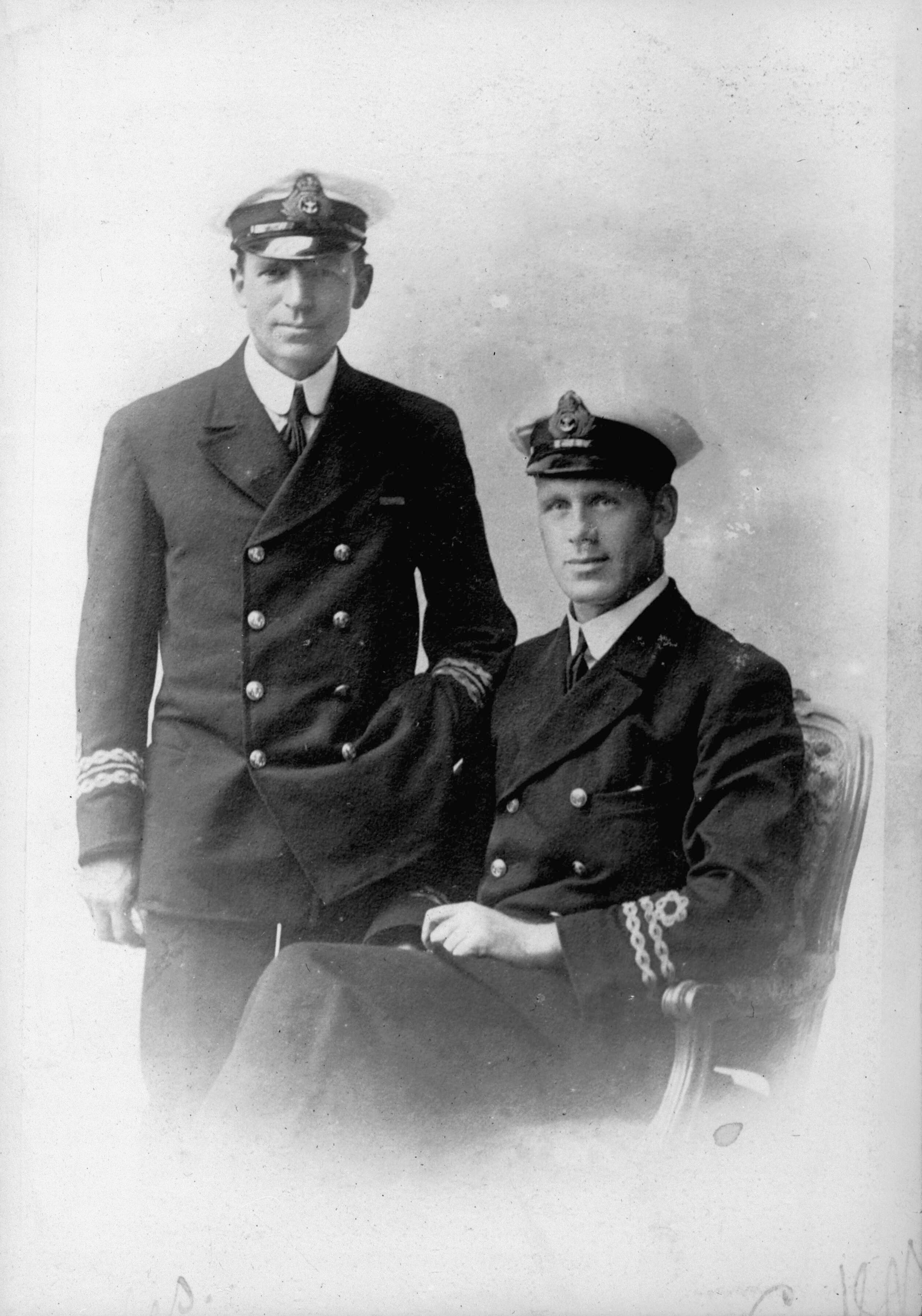
- Frank Worsley and Joseph Stenhouse, circa 1917
- Born: 15 November 1887; Dumbarton, Scotland
- Died: 12 September 1941 (aged 53); Red Sea (KIA)
- Military career
- Allegiance: United Kingdom
- Branch: Royal Naval Reserve
- Service years: 1914–1931, 1939–1941
- Rank: Commander
- Conflicts: World War I World War II
- Awards: Distinguished Service Order; Officer of the Order of the British Empire (OBE); Distinguished Service Cross (DSC); Decoration for Officers of the Royal Naval Reserve (RD)

Commander Joseph Russell Stenhouse, DSO, OBE, DSC, RD, RNR (1887–1941) was a Scottish-born seaman, Royal Navy Officer and Antarctic navigator, who commanded the expedition vessel SY Aurora during her 283-day drift in the ice while on service with the Ross Sea Party component of Sir Ernest Shackleton's Imperial Trans-Antarctic Expedition in 1914–17. After Aurora's escape from the ice he brought her safely to New Zealand, but was thereafter replaced as the vessel's commander. He later served with distinction in the Royal Navy during both World Wars.

== Early life ==
He was born in Dumbarton, Scotland, into a prosperous shipbuilding family, (Note: The family firm was Birrell, Stenhouse & Co.) and was educated in England at Barrow Grammar School. After a short spell as a junior clerk with Lloyd's Register of Shipping, he served a Merchant Officer's apprenticeship on tall ships rounding Cape Horn. He then joined the British India Steam Navigation Company before receiving a last-minute appointment as First Officer on the Aurora, which was then in Australia awaiting refit. Receiving a commission as a sub-lieutenant in the Royal Naval Reserve on 1 August 1914, Stenhouse sailed for Australia aboard the Ionic on 18 September.

== The Aurora ==
=== In McMurdo Sound ===
Aurora, commanded by Captain Aeneas Mackintosh, left Hobart for Antarctica on 24 December 1914 and arrived in McMurdo Sound, with the Ross Sea Party, on 14 January 1915. The party's main mission was to lay depots across the Ross Ice Shelf for Shackleton's expected transcontinental party. When Mackintosh left to take charge of depot-laying operations, Stenhouse took over command of the ship, with the task of finding a suitable winter anchorage. He had two problems here; first, he was inexperienced in these waters; secondly he was handicapped by Shackleton's prior instruction to Mackintosh that the ship be anchored somewhere north of the Glacier Tongue, (Note: Glacier Tongue was an ice promontory protruding out into McMurdo Sound about midway between Cape Evans to the north and Hut Point to the south.) to reduce the risks of its being trapped in the frozen seas around Hut Point – the fate of Captain Scott's RRS Discovery in 1902–04. Since Discovery, no ship had attempted to winter in the Sound – Nimrod and Terra Nova had returned to New Zealand – and the number of sheltered anchorages north of the tongue was very limited. Stenhouse manoeuvred the ship for many weeks before deciding to anchor at Cape Evans, site of Scott's Last Expedition headquarters, 1910–13. On 14 March the ship was made fast and its engines were subsequently decommissioned for winter maintenance.

Despite great care being taken over the anchorage the winter storms around Cape Evans proved too much, and on the night of 6 May she was wrenched from her moorings and taken out to sea with the ice. Aboard were 18 men, and most of the shore party's clothing, equipment and food. Ashore, stranded, were ten men, including Mackintosh.

=== Adrift ===
The situation which immediately confronted the inexperienced temporary commander was particularly daunting. The ship, attached to a large ice-floe, was blown out of the Sound and into the Ross Sea with no means of control, unable to raise steam, and with weather conditions likely to worsen. They were wholly isolated, despite the repeated efforts of wireless operator Lionel Hooke to make radio contact with Cape Evans and other, more distant stations. (Note: The ship-to-shore equipment was very primitive, but Hooke finally succeeded in raising New Zealand Bluff, though only after Aurora was free from the ice.) During the succeeding perilous weeks, as the ice-bound Aurora drifted northwards, roughly parallel to the coast in the direction of Cape Adare, Stenhouse twice came close towards ordering abandonment of the ship and risking a dangerous sledging journey on the ice. The ship survived, however, and continued its drift into the Southern Ocean. Throughout the drift, Stenhouse endeavoured to keep up his crew's morale, and for scientific purposes maintained regular observations of the behaviour of the ice and direction of drift. (Note: See log entry 22 September 1915, quoted in South, ch. 20.) By February 1916, without sign of release, Stenhouse contemplated the possibility of another year in the ice, but on 12th of that month the ice around her suddenly broke away and she was free. Stenhouse ordered the engines started, and cautiously worked the ship out of the loose pack into the open sea. After a 1000-mile voyage through rough seas to New Zealand, and with assistance in the final stages from a tug, he brought Aurora into Port Chalmers on 3 April 1916.

=== In New Zealand ===
His urgent priority after arrival was to get Aurora repaired and to take her back to McMurdo Sound to rescue the stranded men who had by then been marooned for almost a year. He did not find his concerns recognised by immediate action on the part of the authorities. There were questions of cash – Shackleton's expedition funds were exhausted, and the costs of refitting and provisioning a relief expedition were estimated at £20,000. Now Shackleton's apparently cavalier approach to the original organisation of the Ross Sea Party stood against him. Eventually, the combined governments of New Zealand, Australia and Great Britain agreed jointly to meet the costs of the rescue provided that they exercised full control over the mission. Stenhouse still considered that he was the Aurora's commander and assumed that he would lead the relief expedition when the ship was ready to sail, but the representatives of the governments decided that he was too inexperienced. (Note: They were influenced by the advice of Capt. John Davis King who would ultimately lead the relief.) He was also Shackleton's man, and they were adamant that neither Shackleton, who had reappeared in the Falkland Islands after his own extended adventure and escape, (Note: See Imperial Trans-Antarctic Expedition and Sir Ernest Shackleton.) nor his proxy, should lead the relief, and appointed their own choice, Captain John King Davis. The politics of the situation were largely kept from Stenhouse, who was shocked to learn of King's appointment on 4 October, and initially refused to recognise its validity. (Note: He was offered the reversion to his original First Officer role, but rejected this and was then formally dismissed by King.) However, when Shackleton, who had arrived in New Zealand on 12 December, grudgingly concurred with King's appointment, Stenhouse had no choice but to step down. He then returned to England.

=== Award ===
In 1920 King George V appointed Joseph Stenhouse an Officer of the Order of the British Empire (OBE), for his service aboard Aurora.

== First World War ==
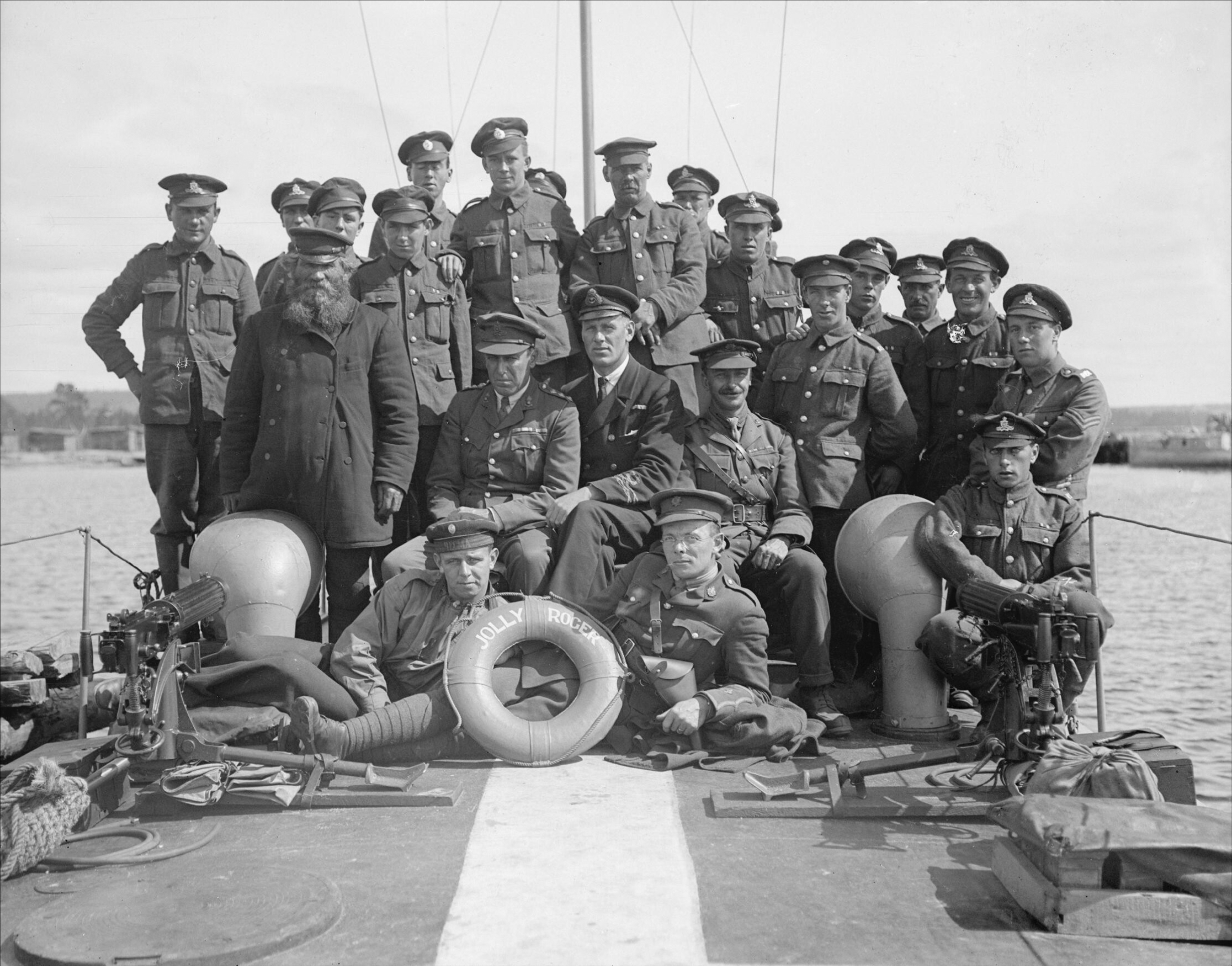
Officers and crew of motorboat Jolly Roger on Lake Onega, summer 1919. Seated officers from left to right are: Major James Mather, DSO, RE (seconded RNVR); Lieutenant Joseph Stenhouse, DSO, DSC, RNR; and Captain Herbert Littledale, MC, RGA (Note: Captain Herbert Francis Littledale was the Jolly Roger's Commanding Officer, an ex–Royal Navy Lieutenant Commander and the ex–HMS Archer's Commanding Officer.)

On his return to England Stenhouse reported for duty with the Royal Navy and was posted as Gunnery Officer to mystery Q-ship PQ61. (Note: PQ61's commander was Frank Worsley who had captained Shackleton's ship Endurance.) On 26 September 1917, the ship engaged and sank a U-boat in the Irish sea, an action which earned Stenhouse a Distinguished Service Cross (DSC) on 17 November. After promotion to lieutenant and a spell in command of the schooner HMS Ianthe, he joined Shackleton on a mission to Murmansk, to equip and train the anti-Bolshevik North Russian Expeditionary Force. This included, from May 1919, command of a flotilla of motor boats operating on Lake Onega to counter the threat of Bolshevik vessels. For this service he was awarded the Distinguished Service Order (DSO). He was made an Officer of the Order of the British Empire (OBE) in 1920.

== Interbellum ==
In 1923 Stenhouse married Gladys Mackintosh, Aeneas Mackintosh's widow, and in 1924 a daughter was born. He was promoted to lieutenant-commander in the RNR on 1 August 1924. Between 1927 and 1929 he captained the Discovery on oceanographic and whaling research voyages in Southern Atlantic and Antarctic waters. Thereafter he attempted several business ventures which largely failed, as did an attempt to find treasure in the Cocos Islands. (Note: Mackintosh had sought this treasure in 1911, with similar lack of success.) In April 1928, Stenhouse was awarded the Decoration for Officers of the Royal Naval Reserve (RD). He retired from the RNR on 31 December 1931 with the rank of commander.

== Second World War ==
At the outbreak of World War II, Stenhouse signed on for active service. While in the Gulf of Aden in 1940, he risked his life to save that of a crew member after his ship was struck by a mine. On 12 September 1941 he was reported missing, presumed killed, when a merchant navy vessel in which he was travelling as a passenger struck a mine, exploded and sank in the Red Sea. Joseph Stenhouse is commemorated by Stenhouse Bluff in the South Shetland Islands at 62°04′S 58°24′W.

== Sources ==
- Sir Ernest Shackleton: South Century Ltd edition 1991, ed. Peter King
- Kelly Tyler-Lewis: The Lost Men Bloomsbury Publications, 2007(pb)
- Stephen Haddelsey: Ice Captain: The Life of J.R. Stenhouse The History Press, 2008 (hb)
- Lennard Bickel: Shackleton's Forgotten Heroes Pimlico Edition, 2000
- Cool Antarctica, pictures of Antarctica, information and travel guide at www.coolantarctica.com
- heritage.antarctica.org
- Scott-Fawcett, Stephen, ed. (May 2018). "The James Caird Society" (PDF). The James Caird Society Journal (9). Archived (PDF) from the original on 21 July 2024.
