= Ternyck Needle =

Conspicuous nunatak

Ternyck Needle (62°5′S 58°16′W) is a conspicuous nunatak, 365 metres (1,198 ft) high, standing 1.5 nautical miles (2.8 km) east of the head of Martel Inlet at the base of the small peninsula separating Admiralty and King George Bays, on King George Island in the South Shetland Islands. It was charted in December 1909 by the French Antarctic Expedition under J.B. Charcot, who presumably applied the name. It was first climbed in 1949 by Geoff Hattersley-Smith and Ken Pawson of the Falkland Islands Dependencies Survey.
