= Stephen Haddelsey =

British author and historian

Stephen Haddelsey FRGS FRHS is a British author and historian specializing in Antarctic exploration. He earned his doctorate at the University of East Anglia, of which he is an Honorary Research Fellow. He is a fellow of both the Royal Geographical Society and the Royal Historical Society. Since 2015, he has worked at the University of Lincoln.

== Early writings ==
Haddelsey's first book was a critical reappraisal of the novels of the nineteenth century Anglo-Irish writer Charles Lever (1806–72), published in 2000 under the title Charles Lever: The Lost Victorian.

== Antarctic research ==
Haddelsey is the author of several books on the history of British and Commonwealth Antarctic exploration, including biographies of Frank Bickerton, mechanical engineer on the Australasian Antarctic Expedition of 1911-14 and Joseph Russell Stenhouse, who commanded the Aurora on the Imperial Trans-Antarctic Expedition of 1914–17. Haddelsey is a distant relative of Frank Bickerton. More recently, Haddelsey has focused on "post-Heroic" expeditions, including Operation Tabarin and the Commonwealth Trans-Antarctic Expedition of 1955-58, led by Sir Vivian Fuchs. He has edited and introduced Andrew Taylor's Two Years Below the Horn: A Personal Memoir of Operation Tabarin, which was published by The Erskine Press in 2017.

He is also a contributor to the Polar Record (Cambridge University Press).

== Awards ==
In 2016, Operation Tabarin: Britain's Secret Wartime Expedition to Antarctica, 1944-46 was awarded the Manitoba Day Award, "which recognizes users of archives who have completed an original work of excellence which contributes to the understanding of Manitoba history".

== Partial bibliography ==
- Operation Tabarin: Britain's Secret Wartime Expedition to Antarctica, 1944-46 (The History Press, 2014) - With Alan Carroll
- Shackleton's Dream: Fuchs, Hillary & the Crossing of Antarctica (The History Press, 2012)
- Ice Captain: The Life of J.R. Stenhouse (Sutton Publishing, 2008)
- Born Adventurer: The Life of Frank Bickerton, Antarctic Pioneer (Sutton Publishing, 2005)
- Charles Lever: The Lost Victorian (Colin Smythe Ltd, 2000)
- Icy Graves: Exploration and Death in the Antarctic (The History Press, 2018)
