= Mount Hopeful =

Mountain in King George Island, South Shetland Islands, Antarctica

Mount Hopeful is a peak standing 1.5 nautical miles (3 km) north of the head of King George Bay and 1.5 nautical miles southeast of Rea Peak on King George Island, in the South Shetland Islands. It was named by the UK Antarctic Place-Names Committee in 1960 for the Enderby Brothers' schooner Hopeful (Captain Henry Rea), which sailed from London in 1833 in company with the tender Rose in order to continue John Biscoe's Antarctic researches. The Antarctic voyage was abandoned after the Rose had been crushed in the pack ice at 60°17′S 53°26′W in December 1833 or January 1834.
