= Admiralen Peak =

Mountain in King George Island, South Shetland Islands, Antarctica

Highest point
- Elevation: 1,000 ft (300 m)
- Coordinates: 62°6′S 58°30′W

Geography
- Location: King George Island, Antarctica

Admiralen Peak, also variously known as Admiration Peak, Pico Puño, or Cerro Le Poing, is a peak, 1,000 feet (305 m) high, lying 0.7 miles (1.1 km) south-southwest of Crepin Point at the west side of Admiralty Bay on King George Island, in the South Shetland Islands. In 1908–10 the French Antarctic Expedition under Jean-Baptiste Charcot applied the name "Le Poing" to a feature in this area. It is not clear, however, which of four summits the name refers to and the name has been rejected. This peak was named by the United Kingdom Antarctic Place-Names Committee (UK-APC) in 1960 for the Admiralen, the first modern floating factory ship, which first operated in Admiralty Bay in January 1906.
