= Chabrier Rock =

Rock in the South Shetland Islands, Antarctica

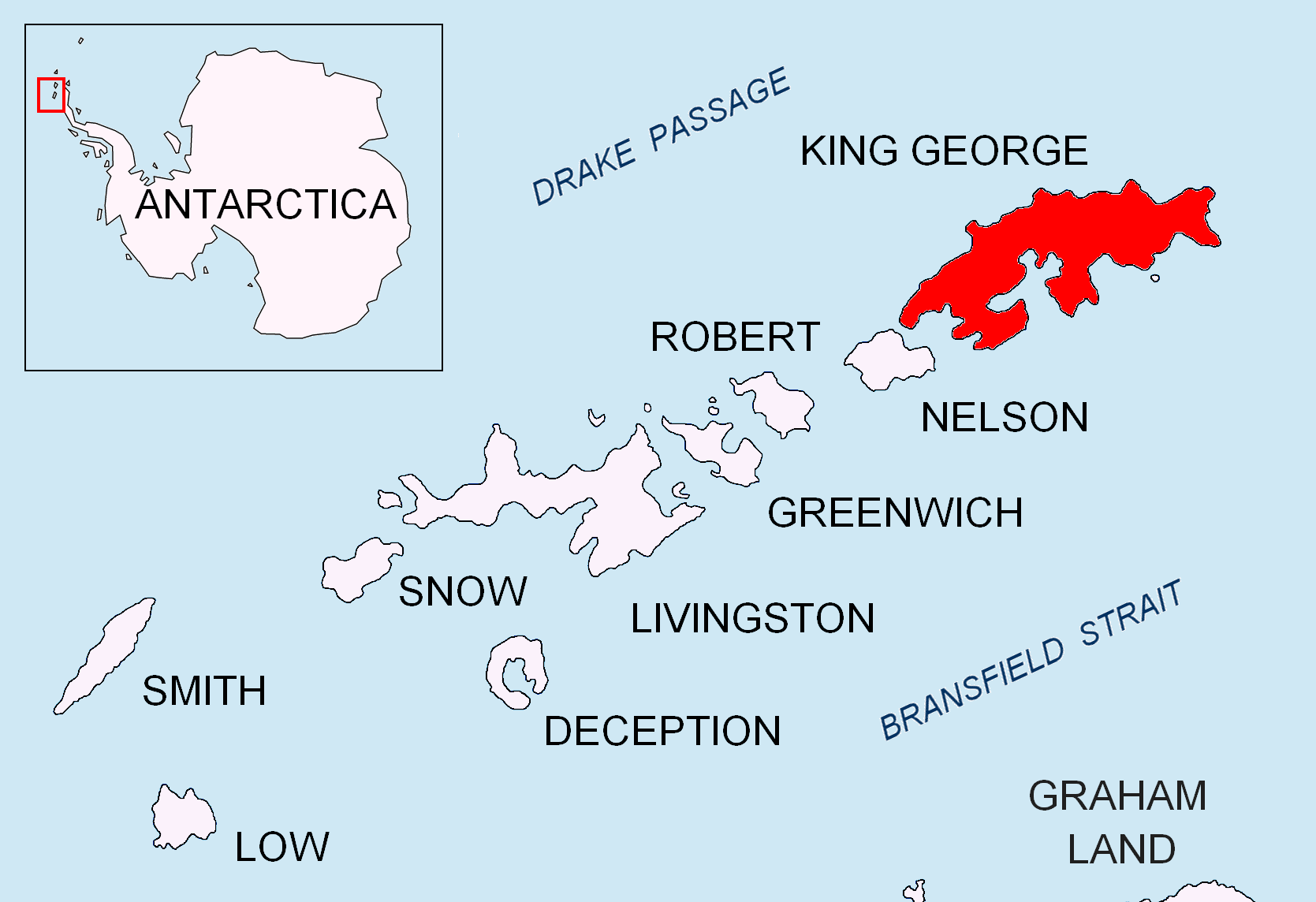
Location of King George Island in the South Shetland Islands

Chabrier Rock (62°11′S 58°18′W) is a rock which lies 0.5 miles (0.8 km) southwest of Vauréal Peak in the east side of the entrance to Admiralty Bay, King George Island, in the South Shetland Islands. It was charted and named in December 1909 by the French Antarctic Expedition under Jean-Baptiste Charcot.

== Maps ==
- Antarctic Digital Database (ADD). Scale 1:250000 topographic map of Antarctica. Scientific Committee on Antarctic Research (SCAR). Since 1993, regularly upgraded and updated.
