= Dufayel Island =

Island in the South Shetland Islands

Coordinates: 62°09′59″S 58°33′29″W

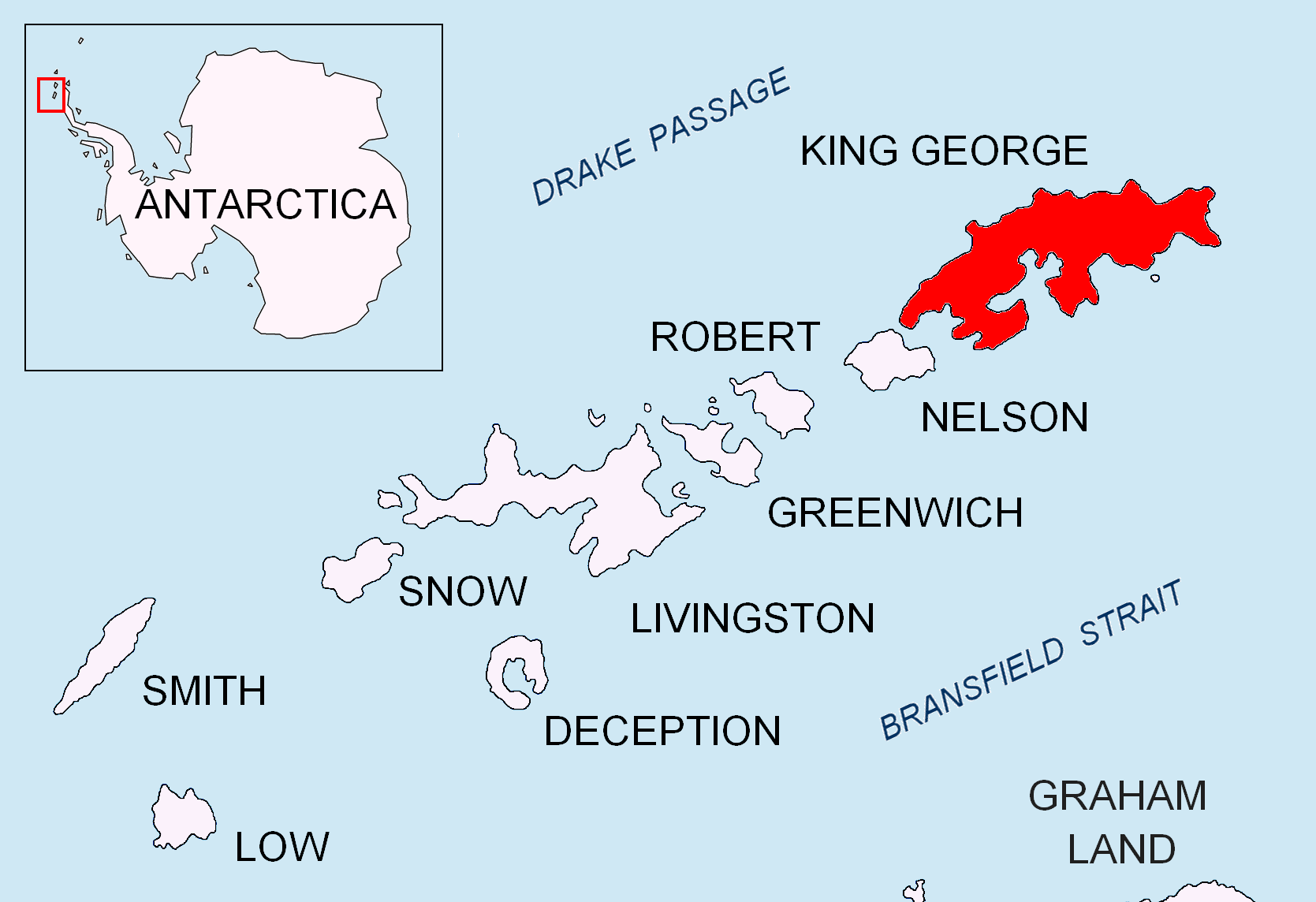
- Location of King George Island in the South Shetland Islands

- Location within Antarctic Peninsula Location within Antarctica

Geography
- Location: Antarctica
- Archipelago: South Shetland Islands

Administration
- Administered under the Antarctic Treaty System

Demographics
- Population: Uninhabited

Dufayel Island is an island lying near the center of Ezcurra Inlet, Admiralty Bay, in the South Shetland Islands. It was charted and named in December 1909 by the French Antarctic Expedition under Jean-Baptiste Charcot.

== See also ==
- List of antarctic and sub-antarctic islands
