= Poetry Glacier =

Glacier in Antarctica

- Map of King George Island

- Location within South Shetland Islands Location within Antarctica
- Location: King George Island; South Shetland Islands
- Coordinates: 61°56′00″S 57°48′00″W
- Thickness: unknown
- Terminus: Venus Bay
- Status: unknown

Poetry Glacier is a glacier flowing north and northwest into the east side of Venus Bay, north King George Island. So named by the Polish Antarctic Expedition, 1984 [in association with "Milosz Point."] Lodowiec Poezji is the translation of the English name.

== See also ==
- List of glaciers in the Antarctic
- Glaciology
