= Keller Peninsula =

Keller Peninsula is a high peninsula separating Mackellar Inlet and Martel Inlet in Admiralty Bay, on King George Island, in the South Shetland Islands of Antarctica. The name Keller was applied by the French Antarctic Expedition under Jean-Baptiste Charcot, who charted Admiralty Bay in December 1909.

== Station G ==
Station G
- Antarctic research station
- Interactive map of Station G
- Coordinates: 62°05′14″S 58°23′38″W
- Established: 18 January 1947
- Demolished: July 1995

Government
  - Type: Administration
  - Body: BAS, United Kingdom
- Active times: All year-round

Keller Peninsula was the location of the British research Station G. The first hut was built on 18 January 1947; a second was constructed on 14 February 1948 and moved to Signy Island in 1950. A hut, known as Sparrow House, was built on 28 January 1949 and a third was established on 6 January 1956. The researchers had the tasks of the searching in the fields of meteorology, glaciology and geology. The station was inhabited in the austral summer 1947 and from January 1948 to 19 January 1961. The buildings were demolished from July 1995 to February 1996 by members of the Brazilian Antarctic Expedition of the nearby Comandante Ferraz Antarctic Station.

== See also ==
- List of Antarctic research stations
- List of Antarctic field camps
- Crime in Antarctica
- Plaza Point
