= Lange Glacier =

Glacier in Antarctica

- Map of King George Island

- Location within South Shetland Islands Location within Antarctica
- Location: King George Island; South Shetland Islands
- Coordinates: 62°07′00″S 58°30′00″W
- Thickness: unknown
- Terminus: Admiralty Bay
- Status: unknown

Lange Glacier (62°7′S 58°30′W) is a glacier flowing into the west side of Admiralty Bay close south of Admiralen Peak, King George Island, in the South Shetland Islands, Antarctica. It was charted by the French Antarctic Expedition, 1908–10, under Jean-Baptiste Charcot, and was named by the UK Antarctic Place-Names Committee in 1960 for Alexander Lange (1860–1922), a Norwegian pioneer of modern steam whaling in the South Shetland Islands in 1905–6, and commander of the Admiralen.

== See also ==
- List of glaciers in the Antarctic
- Glaciology
