= Stenhouse Glacier =

Glacier in Antarctica

- Map of King George Island

- Location within South Shetland Islands Location within Antarctica
- Location: King George Island; South Shetland Islands
- Coordinates: 62°04′00″S 58°25′00″W
- Thickness: unknown
- Terminus: Visca Anchorage
- Status: unknown

Stenhouse Glacier (62°4′S 58°25′W) is a small glacier flowing into the head of Visca Anchorage immediately west of Stenhouse Bluff, on King George Island in the South Shetland Islands. Charted but not named by the French Antarctic Expedition, 1908–10, under Charcot. The name West Stenhouse Glacier arose locally for this feature in 1958 from association with Stenhouse Bluff, but the shortened form recommended by United Kingdom Antarctic Place-Names Committee (UK-APC) in 1960 has been adopted.

== See also ==
- List of glaciers in the Antarctic
- Glaciology
