= Pedro de Ezcurra =

Argentine politician

Pedro de Ezcurra (1859–1911) was an Argentine politician who served as Minister of Agriculture in the early 20th century. The French Antarctic Expedition, 1908–10, named Ezcurra Inlet after him, because of the assistance he gave to the expedition.
