= Lafourcade =

Lafourcade is a surname. Bearers include:

- Members of the French noble family Forcade
- Natalia Lafourcade (born 1984), Mexican singer and songwriter, niece of Enrique
- Michel Lafourcade (1941–2006), French firefighter commander
- Jérôme Lafourcade (born 1983), French footballer
- Enrique Lafourcade (1927–2019), Chilean writer and journalist, uncle of Natalia
- Émile Lafourcade-Cortina (1864–1904), French fencer

== See also ==
- Fourcade, a related surname
