= Stenhouse Bluff =

Mountain in the antarctic

Stenhouse Bluff (62°4′S 58°24′W) is a southern face of a rocky knoll at the head of Visca Anchorage, Admiralty Bay, on King George Island in the South Shetland Islands. First charted by the French Antarctic Expedition, 1908–10, under Charcot. Named for Commander Joseph Stenhouse, Royal Navy Reserve, captain of the RRS Discovery in these waters in 1927.

== See also ==
- O'Connors Rock
