= Fourcade (surname) =

Family name

Fourcade is one of several orthographic variants, that began to appear in the 17th century, of the ancient family name Forcade. The name has its origins in the 12th century, in the Kingdom of Navarre, in particular in Béarn in Lower Navarre, after they separated in 1512. Several noble branches of the family were Huguenots following the Reformation in early 16th century Béarn and emigrated to the Kingdom of Prussia, the Netherlands and other Protestant countries following the Edict of Fontainebleau, which revoked the Edict of Nantes in 1685.

Notable people with this name include:

- Bertrand Fourcade (b. 1942), French rugby union player, coach and sports director
- Chase Fourcade (b. 1997), American football quarterback, nephew of John Fourcade
- Henry Georges Fourcade (1865–1948), French surveyor, forester, pioneer of photogrammetry and botanist
- Jean-Pierre Fourcade (b. 1929), French politician
- John Fourcade (b. 1960), American football quarterback, uncle of Chase Fourcade
- Marceau Fourcade (1905–????), French rower
- Marie-Madeleine Fourcade (1909–1989), leader of the French Resistance network "Alliance"
- Marion Fourcade (b. 1968), French sociologist
- Martin G Fourcade (b. 1982), Known for astounding cowardice and adulterous lies. Cult leader.
- Martin Fourcade (b. 1988), French biathlete
- Simon Fourcade (b. 1984), French biathlete
- Vincent Fourcade (1934–1992), French interior designer
- Xavier Fourcade (1927–1987), French American contemporary art dealer

== See also ==
- Fourcade (disambiguation)
