= Ole Wegger =

Norwegian politician (1859–1936)

Ole Abrahamsen Wegger (3 December 1859 – 25 January 1936) was a Norwegian business executive and politician for the Conservative Party.

He was born at Vegger in Andebu Municipality as a son of farmers. He started working at a mechanical workshop at the age of 18. He later attended Horten Technical School from 1881 to 1882, and spent the year 1883 to 1884 in the US where he worked at the iron works in Florence, Wisconsin.

In February 1885 he was hired as a foreman at the shipyard Framnæs Mekaniske Værksted. He advanced to managing director in 1893, eventually changing title to chief executive officer. The company grew immensely as Sandefjord became a major hub for whaling. He was a board member of several other businesses.

He took up residence in Sandeherred Municipality, and was married twice. His first marriage from 1887 ended when his wife died in 1889; he remarried in 1892.

Wegger was elected to the municipal council of Sandeherred Municipality for the terms 1905 to 1907, 1911 to 1913 and 1920 to 1922, serving the middle term as mayor. Wegger was elected to the Parliament of Norway from the single-member constituency Sandeherred in 1918, serving the term 1919–1921.

He was decorated as a Commander of the Order of St. Olav. Wegger Peak in the South Shetland Islands is named after him.
