= Fourcade Glacier =

Glacier in Antarctica

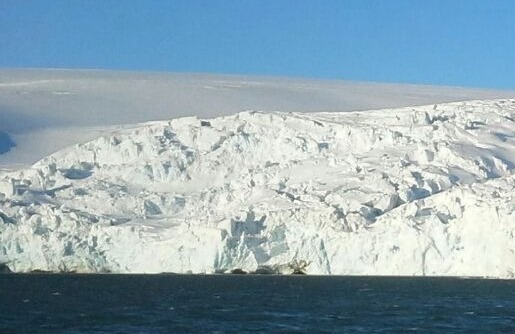
- Fourcade Glacier

- Location within South Shetland Islands Location within Antarctica
- Location: King George Island; South Shetland Islands
- Coordinates: 62°13′00″S 58°40′00″W
- Thickness: unknown
- Status: unknown

Fourcade Glacier (62°13′S 58°40′W) is a glacier at the head of Potter Cove, Maxwell Bay, on King George Island in the South Shetland Islands. It was named by the Polish Antarctic Expedition, 1980, after Nestor H. Fourcade of the Instituto Antartico Argentino, who made detailed geological investigations of Potter Cove and Fildes Peninsula in several seasons, 1957–58 to 1960–61.

== See also ==
- List of glaciers in the Antarctic
- Glaciology
