= Ullmann Spur =

Ridge on King George Island, South Shetland Islands

Ullmann Spur (62°4′S 58°22′W) is a mountainous ridge, 275 m, situated centrally at the head of Martel Inlet, Admiralty Bay, on King George Island in the South Shetland Islands. It was charted and named by the French Antarctic Expedition, 1908–10, under Jean-Baptiste Charcot. Its southwest end is named Ullman Point in association with the spur, although this name was only applied twenty years later.
