= Rea Peak =

Mountain in King George Island, South Shetland Islands, Antarctica

Coordinates: 62°1′S 58°9′W

Rea Peak is a peak, 590 m, lying nearly 2 nautical miles (3.7 km) northeast of Rose Peak and 1.5 nautical miles (2.8 km) northwest of Mount Hopeful in the central part of King George Island, in the South Shetland Islands. Named by the United Kingdom Antarctic Place-Names Committee (UK-APC) in 1960 for Henry Rea, Master of the Enderby Brothers' schooner the tender Rose to continue John Biscoe's Antarctic researches. The Antarctic voyage was abandoned after the December 1833 or January 1834.
