= Flagstaff Glacier =

Glacier in Antarctica

- Map of King George Island

- Location within South Shetland Islands Location within Antarctica
- Location: King George Island; South Shetland Islands
- Coordinates: 62°05′00″S 58°26′00″W
- Thickness: unknown
- Status: unknown

Flagstaff Glacier (62°5′S 58°26′W) is a very small glacier lying immediately north of Flagstaff Hill on Keller Peninsula, King George Island, in the South Shetland Islands. The name arose locally in about 1958 and derives from association with Flagstaff Hill.

== See also ==
- List of glaciers in the Antarctic
- Glaciology
