= Sultan Glacier =

Glacier in Antarctica

- Location of Elephant Island in the South Shetland Islands

- Location within South Shetland Islands Location within Antarctica
- Location: Elephant Island; South Shetland Islands
- Coordinates: 61°08′00″S 55°21′00″W
- Thickness: unknown
- Terminus: Table Bay
- Status: unknown

Sultan Glacier is a glacier flowing south-west into Table Bay, Elephant Island, in the South Shetland Islands of Antarctica. It was named by the United Kingdom Antarctic Place-Names Committee (UK-APC) after HMS Sultan, a shore-based Royal Navy engineering school which provided the refuge hut for the UK Joint Services Expedition to Elephant Island, 1970-71.

== See also ==
- List of glaciers in the Antarctic
- Glaciology
