= Stigant Point =

Coordinates: 62°2′S 58°45′W

Stigant Point is a conspicuous point, 65 m high, lying 11 km (6.8 mi) south-west of Davey Point on the north coast of King George Island, in the South Shetland Islands of Antarctica. It was charted in 1935 by DI personnel, and named for G. B. Stigant, Chief Civil Hydrographic Officer of the Hydrographic Department of the Admiralty.
