= Davey Point =

Headland in King George Island, South Shetland Islands

Coordinates: 61°58′S 58°34′W

Davey Point is a conspicuous rocky headland 6 km (3.7 mi) south-west of Round Point on the north coast of King George Island, in the South Shetland Islands of Antarctica.

== History ==
This feature was charted and named Round Island by Discovery Investigations personnel on the Discovery II in 1935, but air photos now show that it is not an island but a rocky point. Since there is already a Round Point on King George Island, a new name was substituted by the UK Antarctic Place-Names Committee in 1960. Davey Point is named for Graham J. Davey, a Falkland Islands Dependencies Survey assistant surveyor at Admiralty Bay in 1957 and 1958, who triangulated King George Island and extended this triangulation to Nelson Island, Robert Island and Greenwich Island.
