= Mackellar Inlet =

Mackellar Inlet (62°5′S 58°28′W) is an inlet forming the northwestern head of Admiralty Bay, at King George Island in the South Shetland Islands. It was probably named by the Fourth French Antarctic Expedition under Jean-Baptiste Charcot, who charted Admiralty Bay in December 1909. Wegger Peak stands on the west side of the inlet entrance.
