= Ezcurra Inlet =

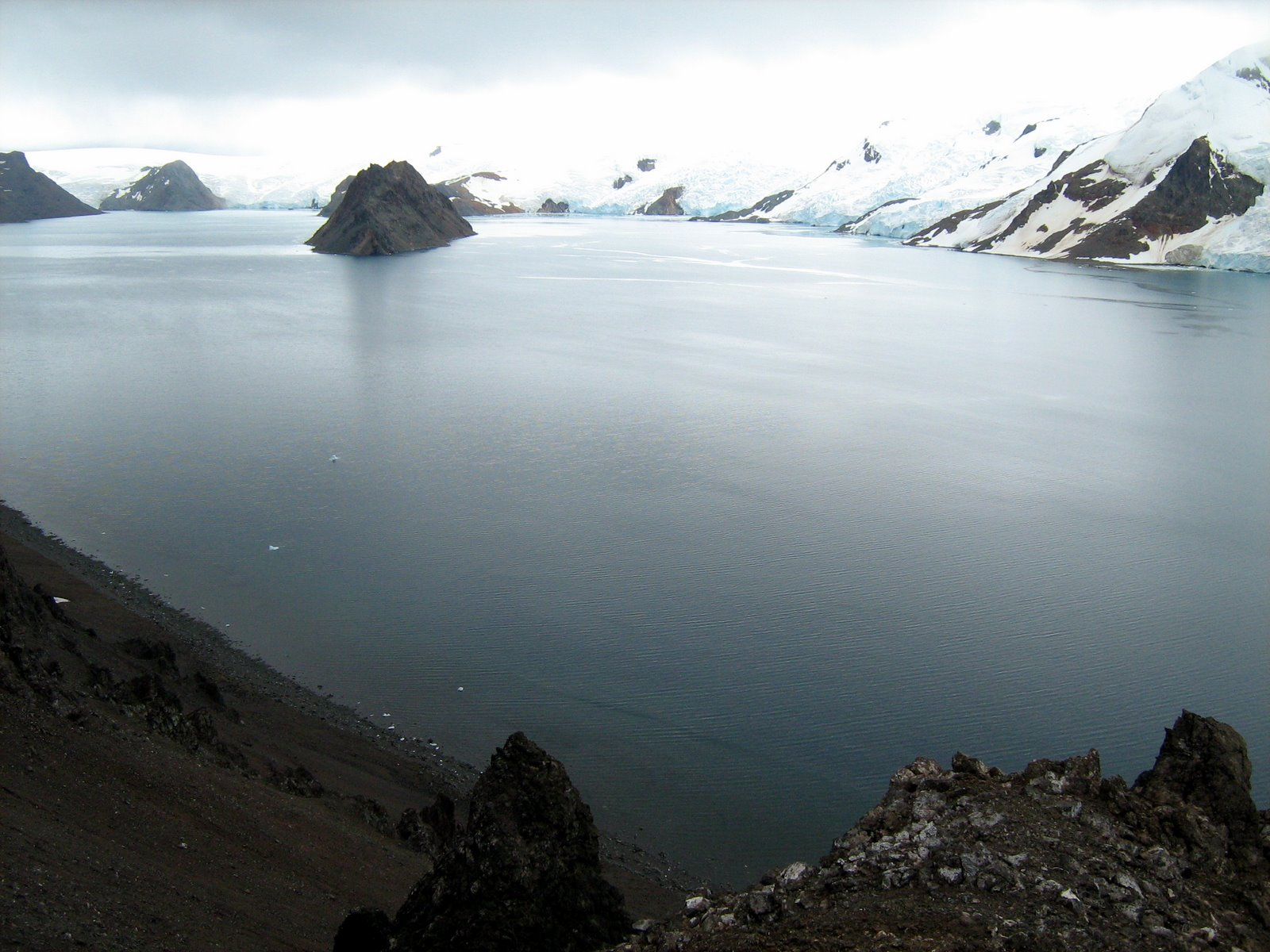
Ezcurra Inlet

Ezcurra Inlet (62°10′S 58°34′W) is an inlet forming the western arm of Admiralty Bay, King George Island, in the South Shetland Islands. It was charted by the French Antarctic Expedition, 1908–10, under Jean-Baptiste Charcot, and named "Fiord Ezcurra" after Pedro de Ezcurra, an Argentine politician and Minister of Agriculture in 1908, who assisted the French expedition.

Shortly after this area was charted, a mariner's guide to the region stated that "the western fijord does not appear to offer good anchorage, as it is too exposed to squalls." Additionally, it was said to have not been used by whalers who frequented the waters due to the ice floes that blocked access to Admiralty Bay.

Hervé Cove indents the south side of the inlet, 2 nautical miles (4 km) southwest of Point Thomas. It was charted by the French Antarctic Expedition under Charcot, and named by him for a member of the expedition. Italia Valley lies east-northeast.

== See also ==
- Emerald Icefalls
- Rhyolite Head
