= Henryk Arctowski Polish Antarctic Station =

Arctowski Station Polska Stacja Antarktyczna im. Henryka Arctowskiego
- Antarctic base
- Henryk Arctowski Polish Antarctic Station
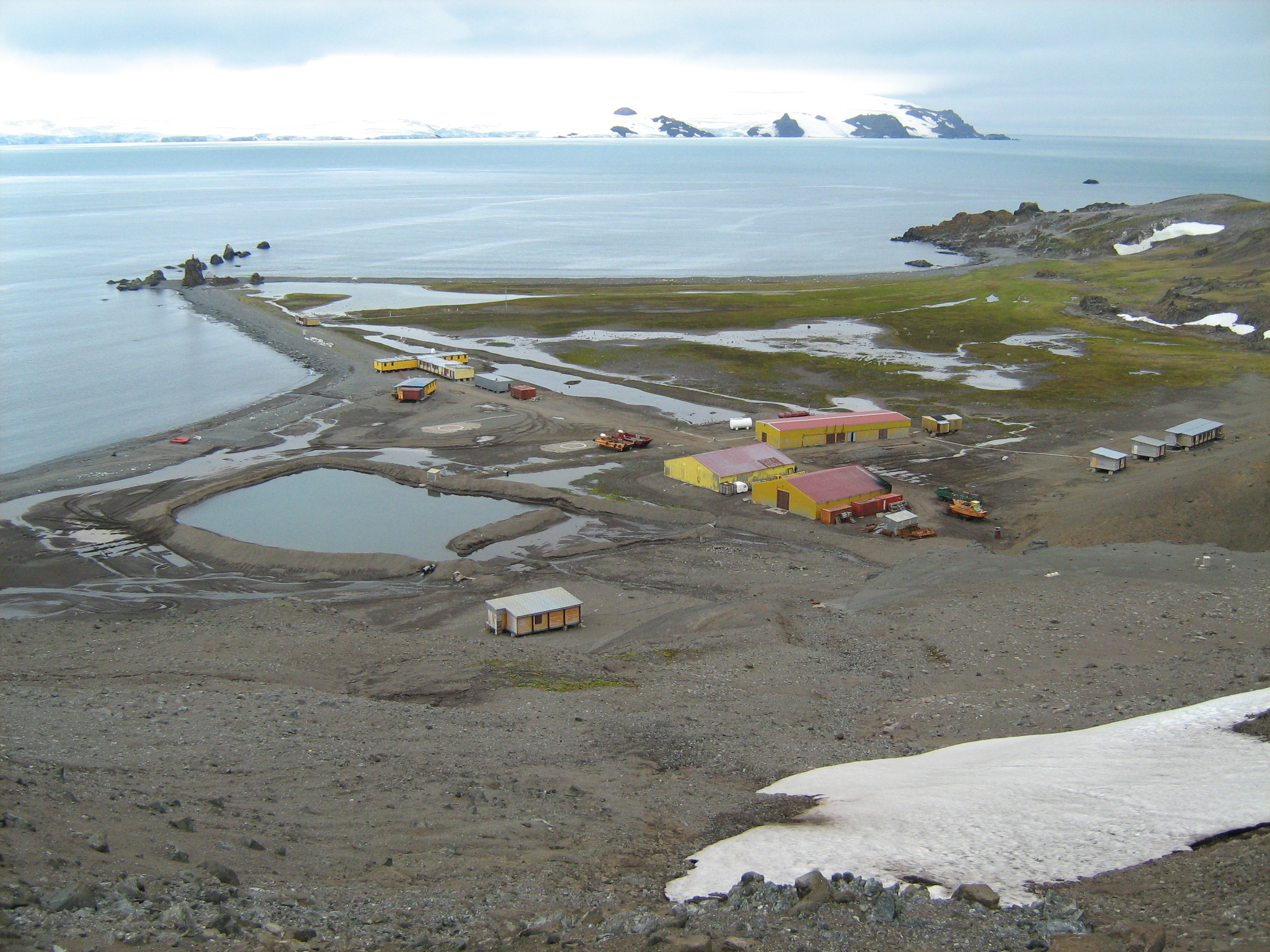
- General view of Henryk Arctowski Station

- Location of Arctowski Station in Antarctica
- Coordinates: 62°09′37″S 58°28′24″W
- Country: Poland
- Location in Antarctica: King George Island
- Administered by: Polish Academy of Sciences
- Established: 26 February 1977
- Elevation: 2 m (6.6 ft)

Population (2017)
  - Summer: 40
  - Winter: 16
- UN/LOCODE: AQ ARC
- Type: All-year round
- Period: Annual
- Status: Operational
- Activities: List: Biology; Oceanography; Geomorphology; Glaciology; Magnetism
- Website: Arctowski
- Arctowski Lighthouse
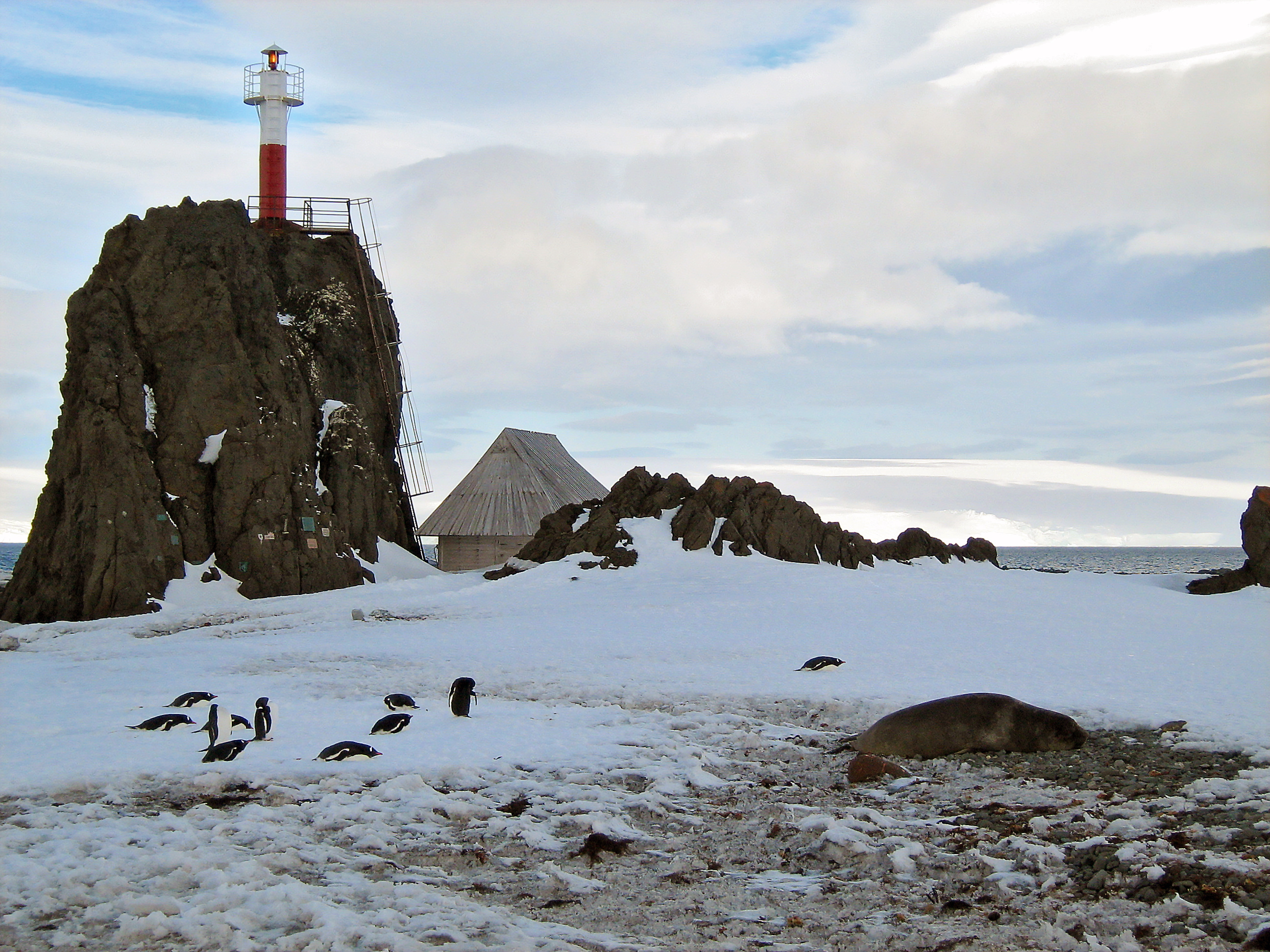
- Constructed: 1978
- Foundation: concrete base
- Construction: concrete tower
- Height: 11 metres (36 ft)
- Shape: cylindrical tower with balcony and lantern
- Markings: red (lower) and white (upper) tower
- Power source: solar power
- Operator: Polish Academy of Sciences
- Focal height: 18 metres (59 ft)
- Range: 8 nautical miles (15 km; 9.2 mi)
- Characteristic: L Fl W 9s.

Henryk Arctowski Polish Antarctic Station (Polish: Polska Stacja Antarktyczna im. Henryka Arctowskiego) is a Polish research station on King George Island, off the coast of Antarctica.

== History ==
The station is named for Henryk Arctowski (1871–1958), who as meteorologist had accompanied the Belgian explorer Baron Adrien de Gerlache on the Belgian Antarctic expedition "Belgica", 1897–1899. This was the first expedition to overwinter in Antarctica. He proposed the original notion of a wind chill factor, arguing that wind could be as damaging to human flesh as cold in harsh climates.

Established on 26 February 1977, the station is managed by the Polish Academy of Sciences; its main research areas include marine biology, oceanography, geology, geomorphology, glaciology, meteorology, climatology, seismology, magnetism and ecology.

Because it is readily accessible, it is one of the most-visited scientific stations in Antarctica. The beaches near the station have numerous whale bones, relics of the time when the site was used to process whales killed nearby.

The station is near colonies of three different types of Pygoscelis penguins (Adelies, chinstraps, and gentoos), and has been designated a site of Special Scientific Interest (SSI) as provided by the Antarctic Treaty.

=== Historic site ===
The grave of Polish wildlife photographer Włodzimierz Puchalski, surmounted by an iron cross, stands on a hill to the south of the station. Puchalski died on 19 January 1979 in the course of filming a nature documentary in the vicinity of the station. The location of the grave and cross has been designated a Historic Site or Monument (HSM 51), following a proposal by Poland to the Antarctic Treaty Consultative Meeting.

== See also ==
- List of Antarctic research stations
- List of Antarctic field camps
- A.B. Dobrowolski Polar Station
