= Polish Antarctic Expedition =

Coordinates: 62°09′S 58°28′W

The Polish Antarctic Expedition to the A. B. Dobrowolski Polar Station was conducted by a team of doctors, geophysicists, and geomorphologists between 1978 and 1979. It was sponsored by the Polish Academy of Sciences. This was the third expedition organised by the Polish Academy of Sciences, and included establishing a geodetic network in the Bunger Oasis, setting up an astronomical reference point, magnetic observations, and photogrammetric surveys to make maps of the vicinity of the station.

== Geodetic Network ==
A geodetic network was established in the Bunger Oasis by Dr. A. Pachuta and Dr. J. Cisak, using theodolites Wild T2 and distancemeters Zeiss EOK, and consisted of 26 points.

== Features named by the expedition ==
- Dalmor Bank, named after the expedition ship Dalmor
- Gdynia Point, named after Gdynia, Poland
- Klekowski Crag, named after Professor Romuald Klekowski
- Moby Dick Icefall, named during the 1981 expedition after the famous white whale of Herman Melville's 1851 novel Moby-Dick

== See also ==
- A.B. Dobrowolski Polar Station
