= Martel Inlet =

Comandante Ferraz Lighthouse
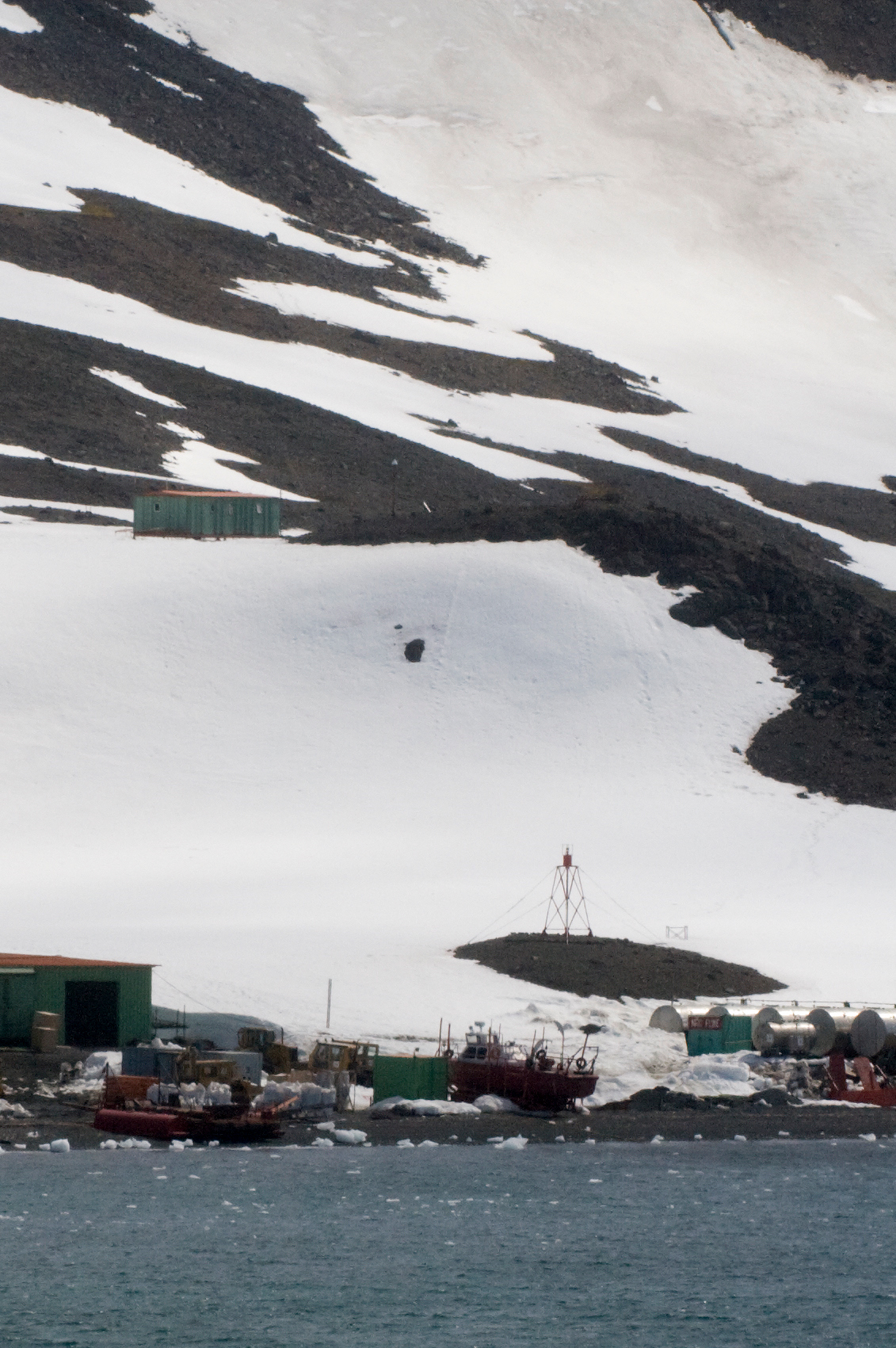
- Martel Inlet Lighthouse located at Comandante Ferraz Antarctic Station
- Location: Martel Inlet; Comandante Ferraz Station; King George Island; Antarctica
- Coordinates: 62°05′02″S 58°23′31″W

Tower
- Constructed: 2007
- Foundation: concrete base
- Construction: metal skeletal tower
- Height: 4 metres (13 ft)
- Shape: square pyramidal skeletal tower with balcony and light
- Markings: red and white tower, red lantern
- Power source: solar power
- Operator: Proantar

Light
- Focal height: 14 metres (46 ft)
- Range: 10 nautical miles (19 km; 12 mi)
- Characteristic: Iso R 2s.

Martel Inlet (62°5′S 58°22′W) is an inlet forming the northeast head of Admiralty Bay, King George Island, in the South Shetland Islands off Antarctica. The inlet and most of its constituent features were charted in December 1909 by the Fourth French Antarctic Expedition under Jean-Baptiste Charcot and named "Fiord Martel" after J.L. Martel, a French politician. The mountain ridge Ullmann Spur is located at the head of the inlet.

Visca Anchorage is the northwestern cove of Martel Inlet. It was named by Charcot for an acquaintance in Montevideo. Within the cove is Sea Leopard Patch, a shoal with a least depth of 18 m (59 ft). It was charted in 1927 by Discovery Investigations personnel on the Discovery and named after the leopard seal, Hydrurga leptonyx.

== See also ==
- List of lighthouses in Antarctica
