= Admiralty Bay (South Shetland Islands) =

Bay of Antarctica

Coordinates: 62°10′S 058°25′W

Location of Admiralty Bay in Antarctica

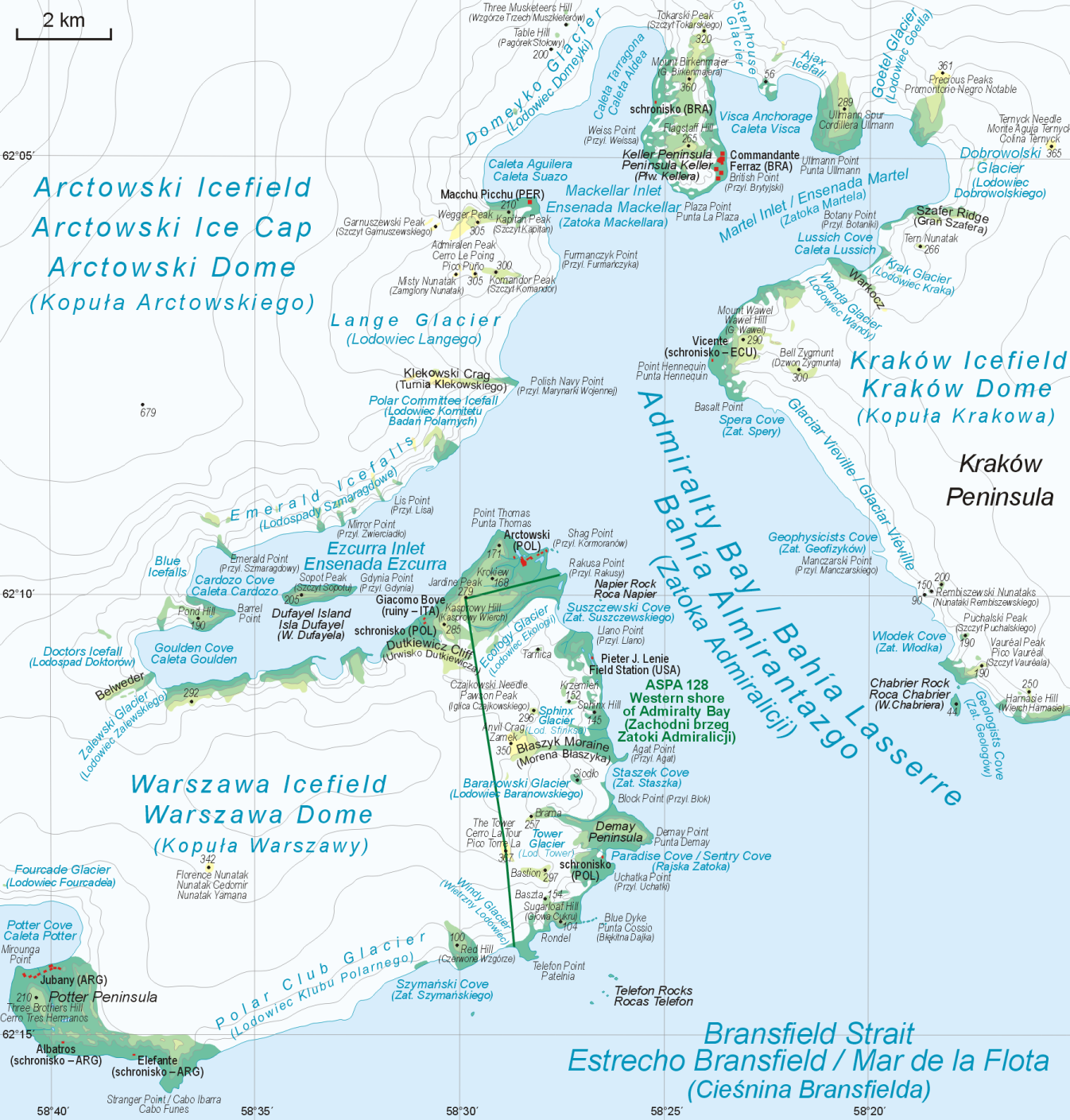
Map of Admiralty Bay

Admiralty Bay is an irregular bay, 8 km (5 mi) wide at its entrance between Demay Point and Martins Head, indenting the southern coast of King George Island for 16 km (10 mi), in the South Shetland Islands of Antarctica. The name appears on a map of 1822 by Captain George Powell, a British sailor, and is now established in international usage. The Henryk Arctowski Polish Antarctic Station is situated on the bay, as is the Comandante Ferraz Brazilian Antarctic Base. It has been designated an Antarctic Specially Managed Area (ASMA 1).

== Description ==
The bay has three fjords: Martel, Mackellar, and Ezcurra. A mariner's guide to the region pronounced the bay to have the best anchorage of any in the South Shetlands, "being well-sheltered all around and having moderate depths over a bottom of good, stiff clay. Ice from the glaciers is frequently troublesome."

Chilean scientists have claimed that Amerinds visited the area, due to stone artifacts recovered from bottom-sampling operations in the bay. However, the artefacts — two arrowheads — were later found to have been planted.

== Important Bird Area ==
A 2000-acre tract of land on the western side of the bay has been identified as an Important Bird Area (IBA) by BirdLife International because it supports breeding colonies of several seabirds, including Adélie penguins (15,000 pairs), gentoo penguins (2300 pairs) and chinstrap penguins (2500 pairs). Other birds recorded nesting at the site are southern giant petrels Cape petrels, snowy sheathbills, kelp gulls, Antarctic terns and skuas. Southern elephant and Weddell seals breed in the area; they, as well as Antarctic fur seals, regularly haul out there. In winter leopard and crabeater seals are often seen on nearby sea ice. The site is also protected as an Antarctic Specially Protected Area (ASPA 128).

== See also ==
- Plaza Point
- Rhyolite Head
