= Siklawa Falls =

Waterfall in the Tatra National Park, Poland

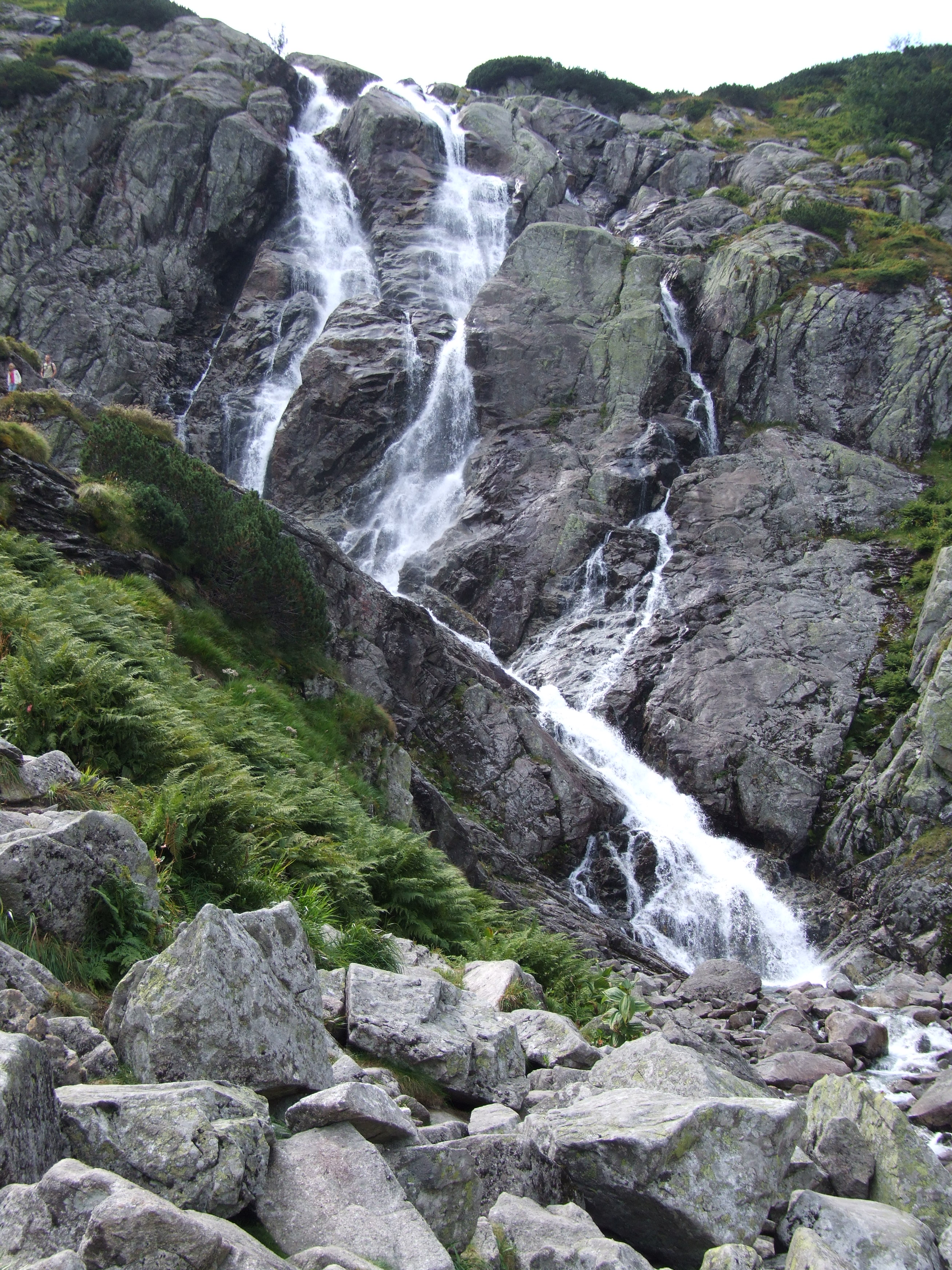
- Siklawa Falls in Roztoka Valley, High Tatras.
- Interactive map of Siklawa Falls
- Location: Tatra Mountains, Poland
- Coordinates: 49.2141556°N 20.0439611°E
- Type: Cascade
- Elevation: 1,600 m (5,200 ft)
- Total height: 70 m (230 ft)
- Watercourse: Roztoka

Siklawa Falls (Polish: Siklawa or Wielka Siklawa) is the highest waterfall in the Tatra National Park, Lesser Poland, dropping a total of 70 meters (230 feet). It is located in the Polish High Tatras in the Roztoka Valley and is also the highest waterfall in the country.

== Etymology ==
The name of the waterfall comes from the word siklawa meaning a mountain waterfall in the Tatra Mountains. Therefore, Wielka Siklawa translates as "great waterfall". The name of another Tatra waterfall, Siklawica, located in Western Tatras near Mount Giewont, is also derived from this word.

== Characteristics and history ==
Siklawa Falls is located roughly 1,600 meters (5,200 feet) above sea level and consists of two or three main flows of water depending on the water level in Wielki Staw Polski. It falls down at the 35° angle and is approximately 70 meters high. It attracts many visitors especially in early spring and after heavy rainfalls.

The waterfall has been a tourist attraction since at least the beginning of 19th century. It has been depicted by painters and poets. In 1832, Seweryn Goszczyński was among the first to mention the majestic beauty of the waterfall in his writings.

A tourist route is located on the right side of the waterfall. The route is considered particularly dangerous when covered in ice. In 1924, Jan Gąsienica-Daniel, a popular mountain guide, died on the route after slipping on ice and falling down the valley.

== Gallery ==
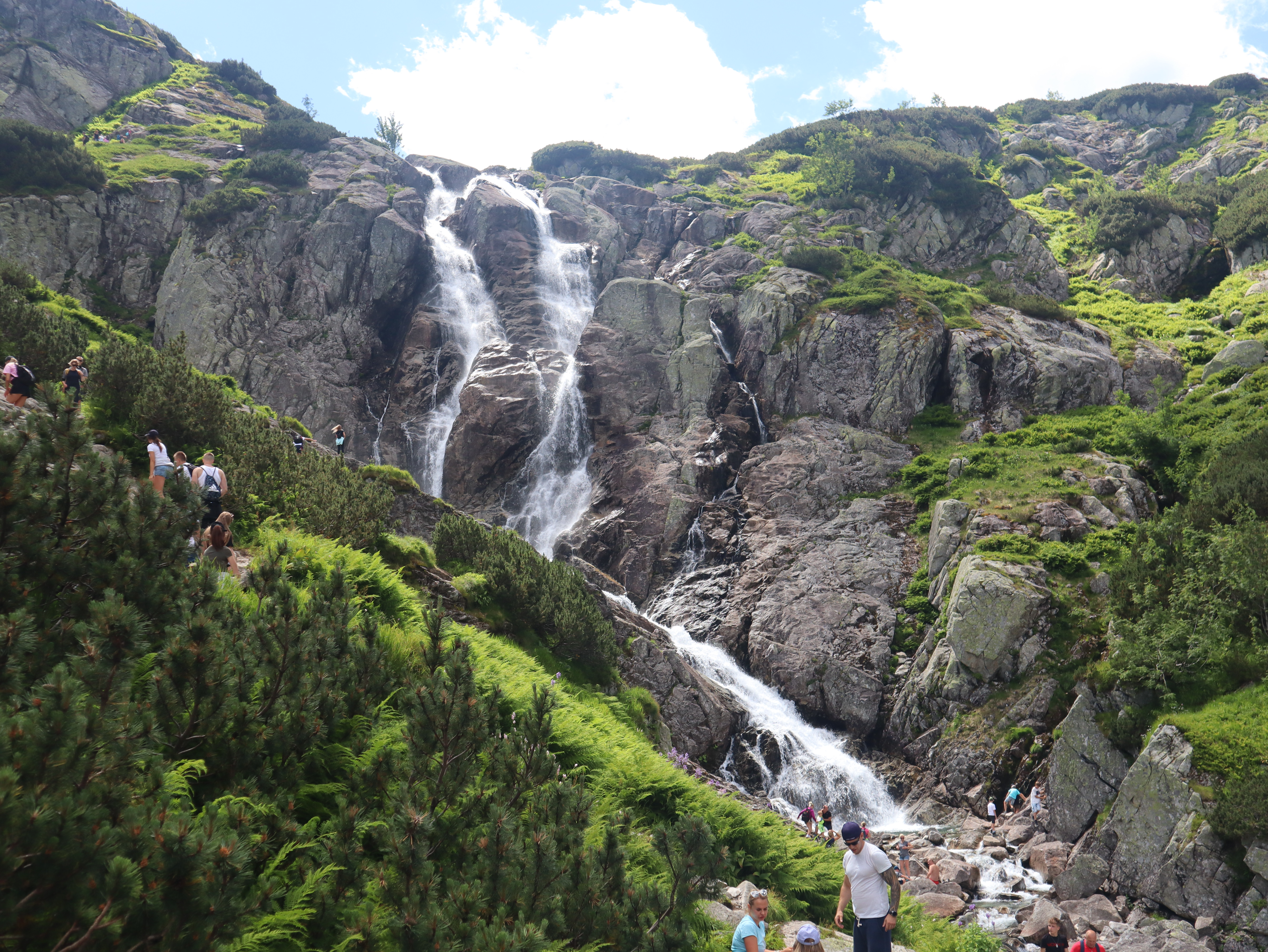
A panorama of Siklawa Falls

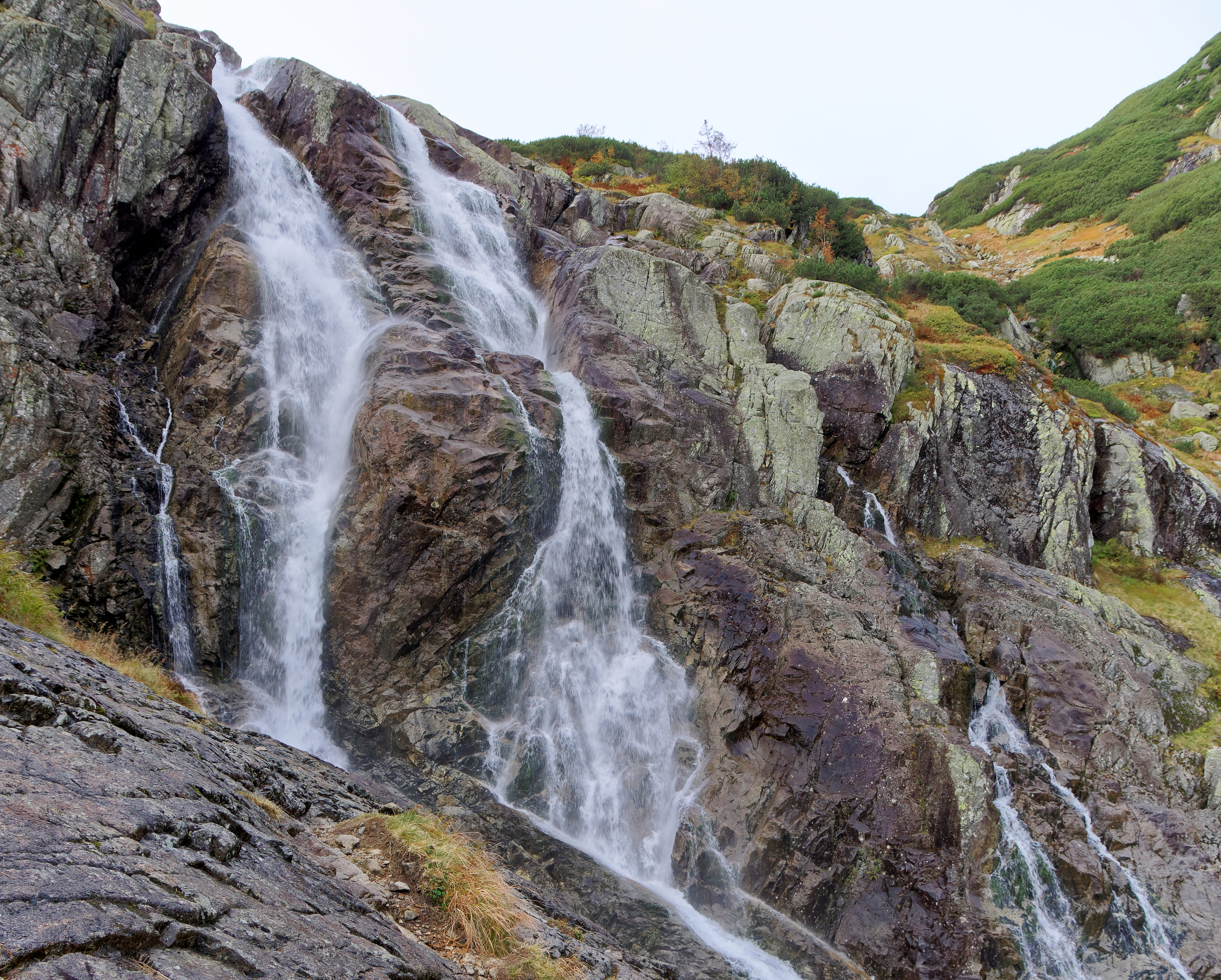
A close-up of the waterfall

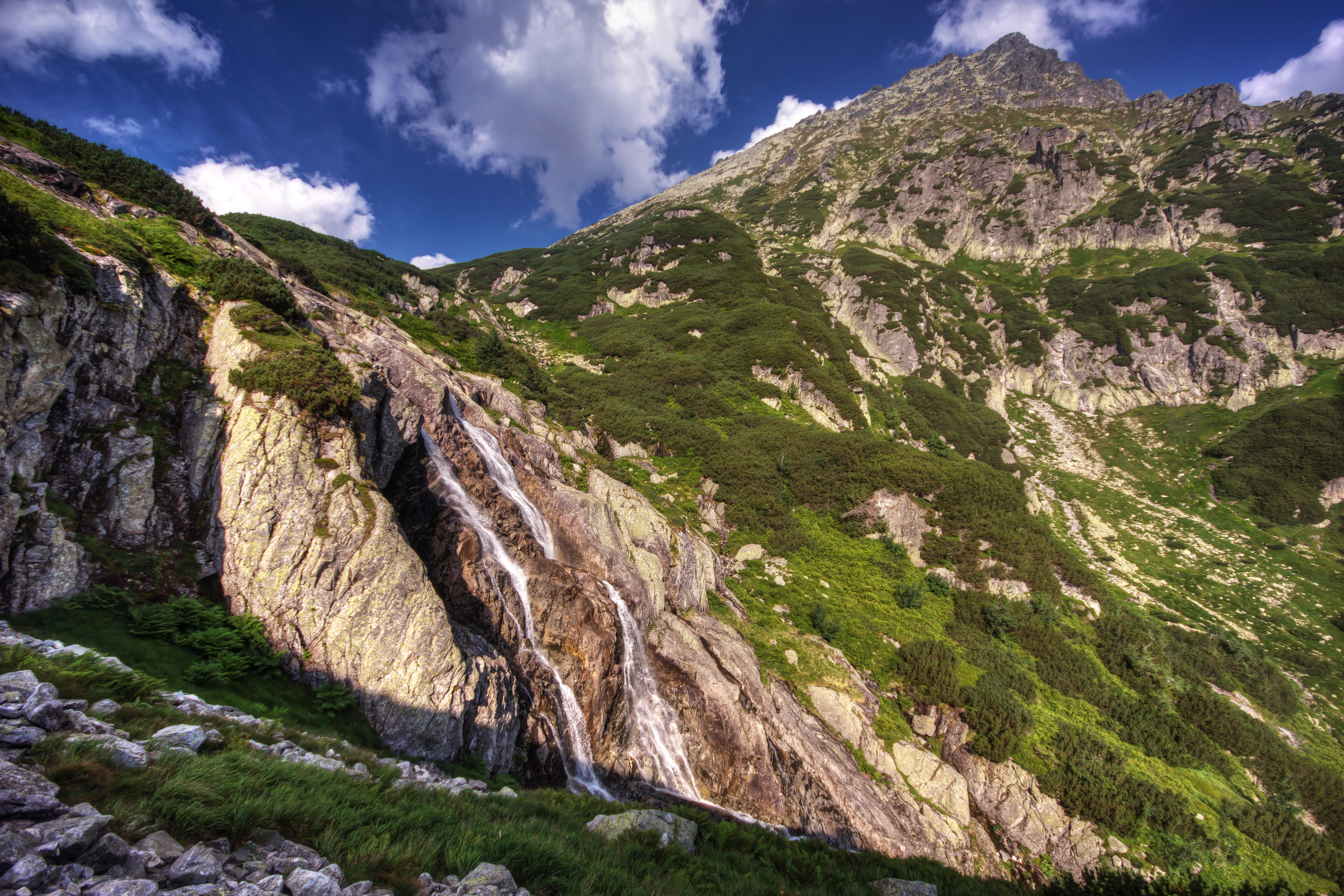
General view

== See also ==
- Geography of Poland
- List of waterfalls
- Kamieńczyk Falls
- Szklarki Falls
- Wilczki Falls
- Podgórna Falls
