= Wilczka Falls Nature Reserve =

Nature reserve in Poland

Coordinates: 50°13′47″N 16°45′40″E

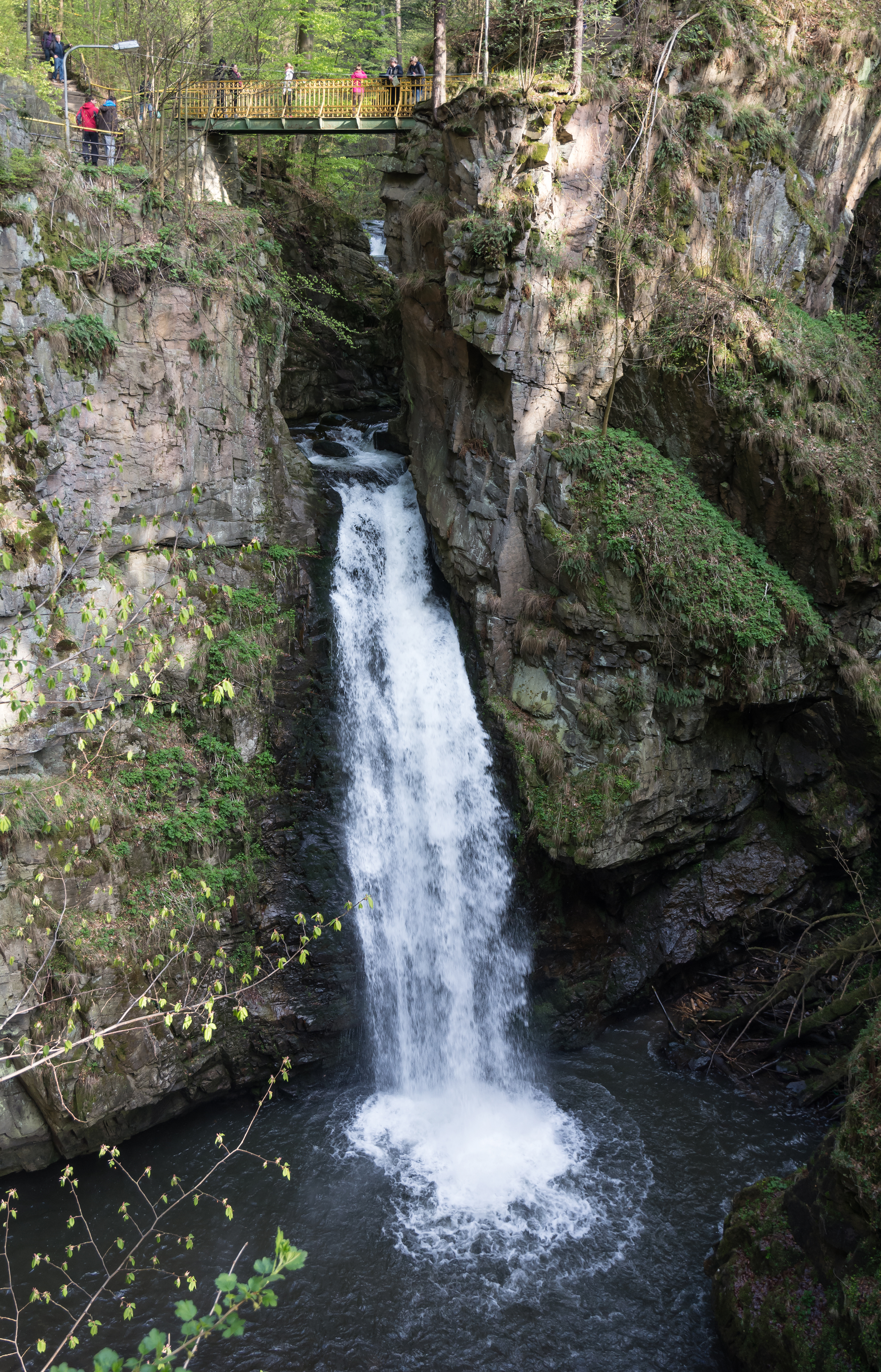
A fragment of the reserve featuring the Wilczki Falls

The Wilczka Falls Nature Reserve is a landscape nature reserve located in Lower Silesia, Kłodzko County, in the Bystrzyca Kłodzka Municipality, near the town of Międzygórze.

== Location and description ==
The reserve is located in the Śnieżnik Landscape Park, at an altitude of 570 m above sea level, within the Natura 2000 area.

Established in 1958 on the area of 2.75 ha, the reserve comprises the area around the Wilczka Falls, basin and gorge. A 2012 decree stated that the area of the reserve was reduced to 2.65 ha, however, it later turned out that two subdivisions were mistakenly omitted. This error was corrected by the 2016 order, which restored the previous, correct value of 2.75 ha.

The reserve consists of an old beech forest with fir, sycamore and spruce admixtures. The following plant species can be found here: cardamine glanduligera, galium odoratum, polygonatum verticillatum, prenanthes purpurea, hordelymus europaeus, athyrium filix-femina, phegopteris connectilis, dryopteris dilatata, lamium galeobdolon, and festuca altissima. The cool, dark and humid microclimate is also conducive to lush bryophyte vegetation. The bottom of the gorge and its mouth are overgrown with leper herb vegetation with moisture-loving plant species such as: white leopard's-foot trefoil, mountain love-grass, mountain water milfoil, and cinquefoil.

== Waterfall ==
Previously called Wodogrzmoty Żeromskiego (Żeromski Falls), the Wilczki Falls (German: Wölfelsfall) is located on the Wilczka River in the Śnieżnik Massif (Eastern Sudetes), near Międzygórze. The height of the waterfall is 22 m. It is the second largest waterfall in the Polish Sudetes, after the Kamieńczyk Falls. Before the great flood in 1997, the water was falling from a height greater by 5 meters. The flood erased an artificially made threshold from the beginning of the 19th century. Before 1945 the height of the waterfall reached as much as 30 m. The cascade falls from a 3 m wide sill into a small eversion basin carved in a less resistant shale. In winter a spectacular icefall is formed around the cascade.

== Tourism ==
The first known description of this place dates back to 1781, written by H. Reisser. The river gorge was then considered unbeaten until 1834, when two officers: Lutz and von Leuthold swam across it. Since the end of the 18th century the waterfall was a destination of frequent excursions from the nearby resorts of Lądek and Długopol-Zdrój. In the 19th century, during the reign of Princess Marianne of Orange, a small park with a fountain was created above the waterfall surrounded by a romantic garden[4]. On the initiative of the Negler siblings, stairs, railings and footbridges were built to access viewpoints and the bottom of the gorge. A fee was charged for visiting the waterfall. No traces of the former park layout have survived to the present day.

Currently, sightseeing is open to the public along the trails marked out in the reserve.

- The red hiking trail from Międzygórze to Mount Igliczna runs nearby.
- There is a steel bridge over the waterfall and an observation point on the opposite side.
- There are two educational nature trails mapped out in the reserve.
- A hotel and a parking lot are located a few dozen metres from the waterfall, on the road to Międzygórze.

== Bibliography ==
- Słownik geografii turystycznej Sudetów. Marek Staffa (redakcja). T. 16: Masyw Śnieżnika i Góry Bialskie. Warszawa: Wydawnictwo PTTK „Kraj”, 1993, ISBN 83-7005-341-6
- Krzysztof R. Mazurski Masyw Śnieżnika i Góry Bialskie, SUDETY Oficyna Wydawnicza Oddziału Wrocławskiego PTTK, Wrocław 1995, ISBN 83-85550-48-8
