= Doctors Icefall =

Antarctic geological feature

Doctors Icefall (62°10′S 58°38′W) is an icefall at the head of Goulden Cove, Ezcurra Inlet, Admiralty Bay, King George Island. It was named by the Polish Antarctic Expedition, 1980, after its doctor teams.
