= Rhyolite Head =

Rhyolite Head (62°10′S 58°36′W) is the headland between Cardozo Cove and Goulden Cove in Ezcurra Inlet, Admiralty Bay, King George Island. It was so named following geological work by British Antarctic Survey (BAS), 1975–76, because the feature largely results from the indurating effects of a rhyolite intrusion, a rare lithology in the South Shetland Islands.
