= Cardozo Cove =

Coordinates: 62°10′S 58°37′W

Cardozo Cove is the northern of two coves at the head of Ezcurra Inlet, Admiralty Bay, on King George Island in the South Shetland Islands. It was probably named by the French Antarctic Expedition under Jean-Baptiste Charcot, who charted Admiralty Bay in December 1909.

== See also ==
- Rhyolite Head
