= Siklawica Falls =

Waterfall in the Tatra Mountains, Poland

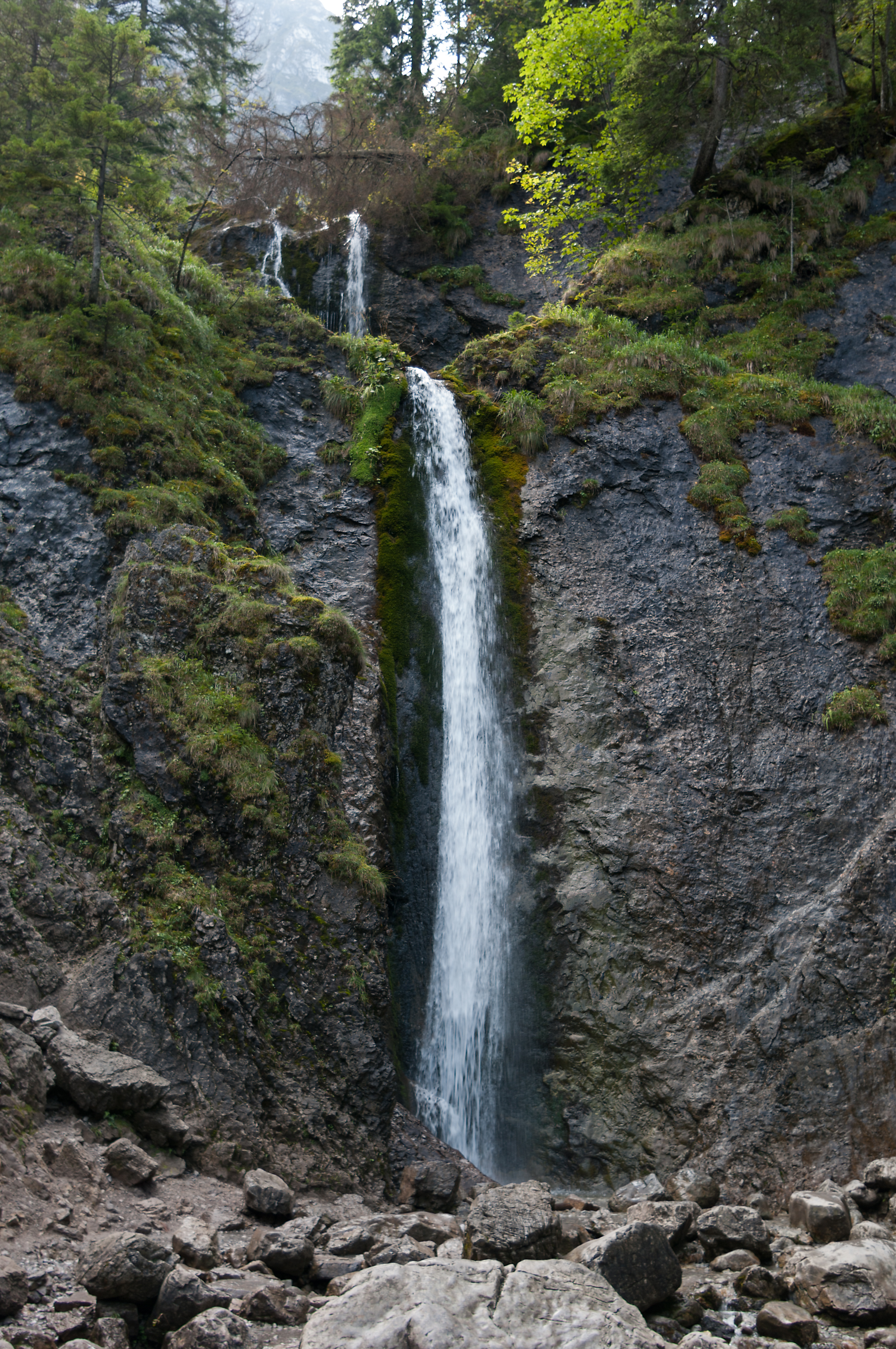
- General view of the waterfall
- Interactive map of Siklawica Falls
- Location: Tatra Mountains, Poland
- Coordinates: 49.25922°N 19.93023°E
- Type: Cascade
- Elevation: 1,100 m (3,600 ft)
- Total height: 24 m (79 ft)
- Watercourse: Strążyski Potok

Siklawica Falls (Polish: Wodospad Siklawica) is a waterfall located in the Western Tatras, south of Zakopane, Poland, dropping a total of 24 m (79 ft) making it the second highest waterfall in the Polish Tatra Mountains.

Siklawica Falls is located at 1,100 metres (3,600 ft) above sea level on the Strążyski Potok brook in the Strążyski Valley of the Western Tatras. The 24-meter high waterfall lies within the Tatra National Park. It descends from two nearly vertically inclined walls (at an angle of 80°) and consists of two main cascades. The height of both the lower and upper cascade is 12 m.

The name of the waterfall is derived from the Siklawa Falls located in the Valley of the Five Polish Lakes. Former names of the waterfall include Sicząca and Siczawa. The site attracted visitors from the early beginnings of tourism in the Tatras in the 19th century with Ludwik Zejszner describing the waterfall in 1849 as "worthy of seeing in every respect".

== See also ==
- Geography of Poland
- List of waterfalls
- Siklawa Falls
