= Goulden Cove =

Goulden Cove (62°11′S 58°38′W) is the southern of two coves at the head of Ezcurra Inlet, Admiralty Bay, on King George Island, in the South Shetland Islands. It was probably named by the French Antarctic Expedition under Jean-Baptiste Charcot, who surveyed Admiralty Bay in December 1909. Located at its head is an icefall called Doctors Icefall.

== See also ==
- Rhyolite Head
