= Wilczki Falls =

Waterfall in the Snieznik Mountains, Poland

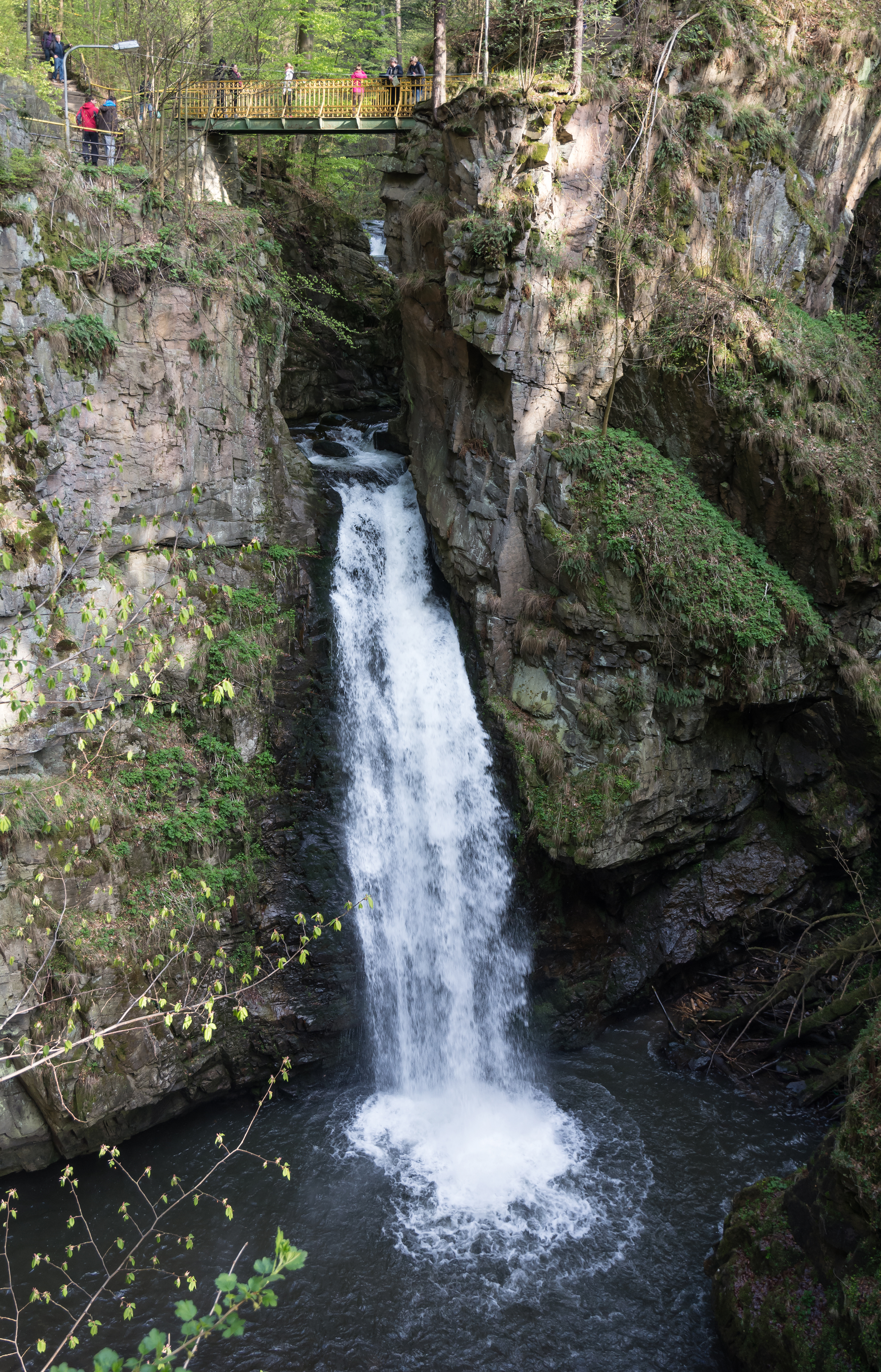
- General view of the waterfall
- Interactive map of Wilczki Falls
- Location: Snieznik Mountains, Poland
- Coordinates: 50.1345°N 16.4538°E
- Type: Cascade
- Elevation: 570 m (1,870 ft)
- Total height: 22 m (72 ft)
- Watercourse: Wilczka

Wilczki Falls (pronounced: [ˈvilt͡ʂki]; Polish: Wodospad Wilczki; German: Wölfelsfall) is a waterfall located in the Wilczka Falls Nature Reserve within the Śnieżnik Landscape Park, Lower Silesia, Poland. It drops a total of 22 metres (72 ft) making it the second highest waterfall in the Polish part of Sudetes after the Kamieńczyk Falls.

== Description and history ==
The Wilczki Falls is a 22-meter high waterfall located at 570 metres (1,870 ft) above sea level on the Wilczka River in the Śnieżnik Massif (Eastern Sudetes), near Międzygórze. It lies within the Wilczka Falls Nature Reserve established in 1958.

The waterfall was previously known as "Wodogrzmoty Żeromskiego" (Żeromski Falls) named in honour of Polish writer Stefan Żeromski. It is the second largest waterfall in the Polish Sudetes, after the Kamieńczyk Falls. A historic bridge is situated over the waterfall. It was created on the initiative of Princess Marianne of the Netherlands who used to own the land.

Before the 1997 Central European flood, the water was falling from a height greater by 5 meters. The flood erased an artificially made threshold from the beginning of the 19th century. Before 1945, the height of the waterfall reached as much as 30 m. The cascade falls from a 3 m wide sill into a small plunge pool carved in a less resistant shale. In winter, a spectacular icefall is formed around the cascade. In 2018, the nature reserve was opened to tourists after the Polish State Forests had carried out an extensive revitalization of the area.

== See also ==
- Geography of Poland
- List of waterfalls
