= Crater Glacier =

Glacier in Washington, United States

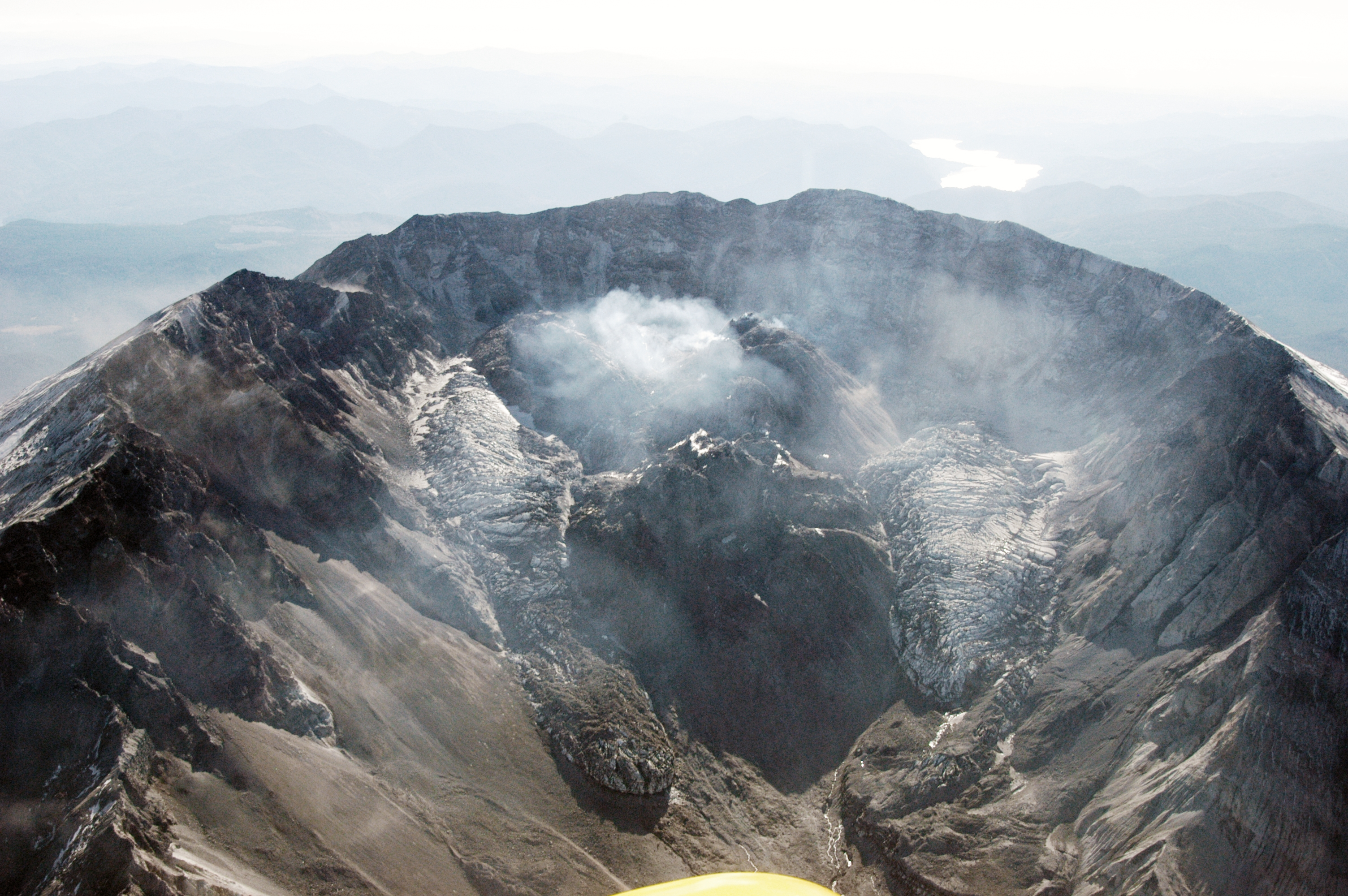
- The Crater Glacier from the north in October 2006
- Interactive map of Crater Glacier
- Type: Mountain Glacier
- Location: Mount St. Helens, Skamania County, Washington, USA
- Coordinates: 46°11′48″N 122°11′15″W
- Thickness: Ranges up to 656 ft (200 m)
- Terminus: Talus
- Status: Expanding

The Crater Glacier (also known as Tulutson Glacier) is a geologically young glacier on Mount St. Helens, in the U.S. state of Washington. The glacier formed after the 1980 eruption and due to its location, the body of ice grew rapidly, unknown to the public for nearly 20 years. The glacier once contained ice caves in the smooth ice before the 2004–2008 volcanic activity. The growth of the lava dome and volcanic eruptions from 2004 to 2008 significantly altered the appearance of the glacier. In the same time period, several agencies decided to put an official name on the glacier which, at first, was Tulutson Glacier. A later decision made Crater Glacier the official glacier name. Despite the volcanic activity, the glacier continued to advance and by mid-2008, the glacier completely encircled the lava domes. In addition, new glaciers (rock or ice) have formed around Crater Glacier as well.

== Description ==
True to its name, the glacier lies inside the north-facing crater left by the 1980 eruption of Mount St. Helens and the glacier's elevation is about 6,794 ft (2,071 m). A massive central lava dome emplaced from 1980 to 1987 occupies the center of the crater, and the glacier formed in the shape of a horseshoe around the dome, with two terminal moraines on the eastern and western sides. Heavy winter snowfall, repeated snow avalanches, rockfalls, and sun-shading by the surrounding cliffs to the south, led to the exceptionally rapid growth of this glacier. Thus, the glacier composition is estimated to be 60% ice and 40% rock, with an average thickness of 328 feet (100 m) and a maximum thickness of around 656 feet (200 m); nearly as deep as Mount Rainier's Carbon Glacier. None of the ice is older than the year 1980, but by 2001 the volume of the new glacier was about 40%-50% as large as all the pre–1980 glaciers combined. The surface of the glacier looks dark and dirty in the summer due to the numerous rockfalls from the steep, unstable crater walls along with ash from eruptions, all of which help to insulate and protect the growing glacier. The 2004-2008 volcanic activity created a series of domes that nearly split the glacier into two lobes at the south end of the crater. In spite of the four-year lava dome building period, the glacier remains North America's youngest and fastest growing glacier. With the joining of the termini on the north end of Crater Glacier in May 2008, the body of ice completely encircles the lava domes. Meltwater from the glacier gives rise to Loowit Creek.

Pre-2004 eruption glacier caves of Crater Glacier

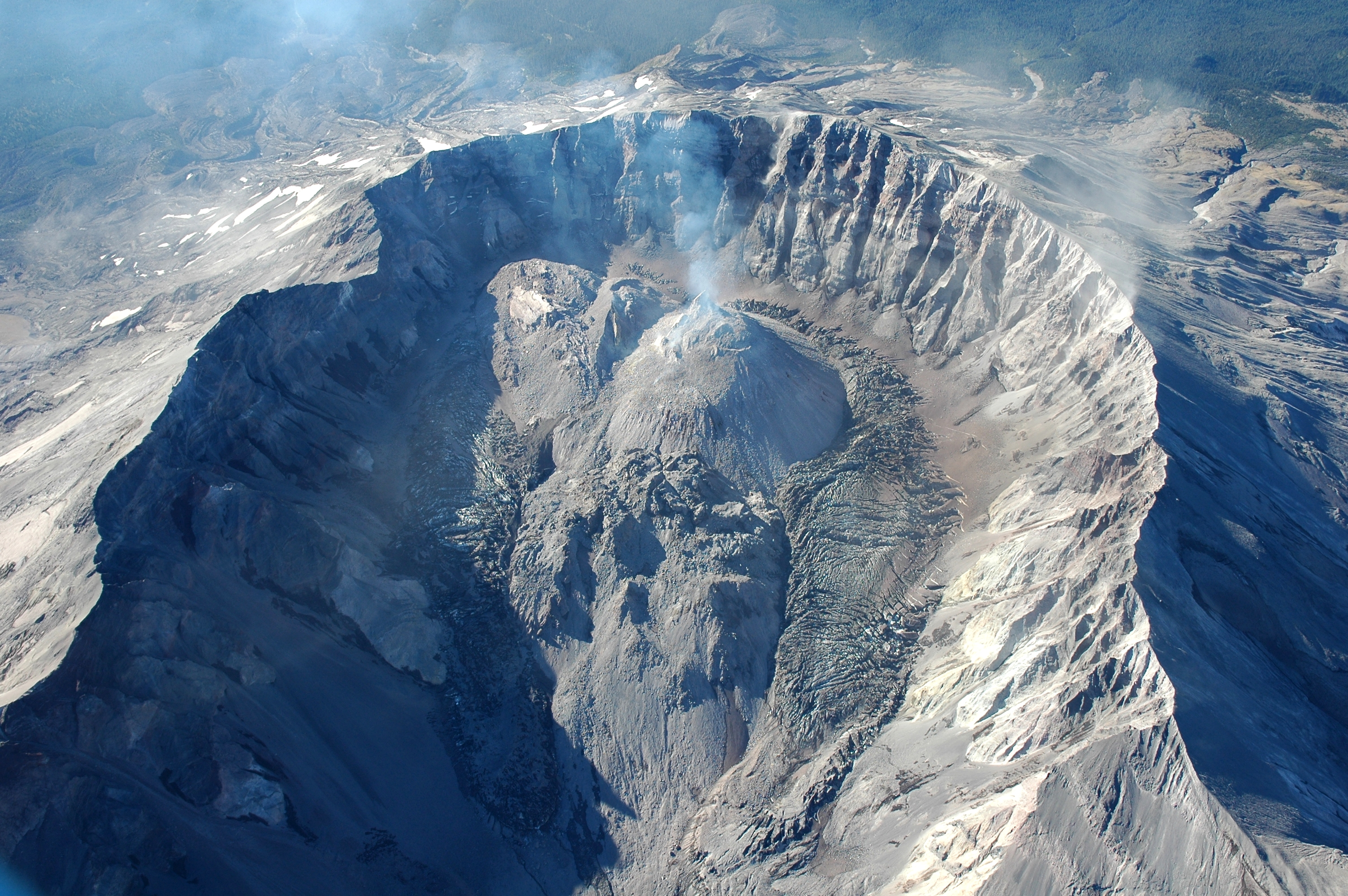
New glaciers are forming on the crater wall, above and to the left of the lava dome (zoom in to view).

In 2000, glacier caves were discovered on the then-smooth glacier surface. Many of these glacier caves were big enough to explore, like the glacier caves on the summit of Mount Rainier. Most of the glacier caves were located near the 1980s lava dome, where hot steam and volcanic gas emissions from hidden fumaroles on the crater floor or lava dome melted holes in the young glacial ice. About 7,900 feet or 2.4 km of caves and passageways in the glacier were mapped and studied.

Other glaciers and new rock glaciers

Since 2004, new glaciers have formed on the crater wall above Crater Glacier feeding rock and ice to Crater Glacier below. In addition, there are two rock glaciers to the north of the eastern lobe of Crater Glacier and one north of the western lobe. Two of these rock glaciers have merged with the Crater Glacier, with one on the west and one on the east. The other rock glacier on the eastern slopes of the crater wall is very close to touching the glacier.

== Evolution ==
In the months after the eruption, the crater floor of St. Helens remained hot and unstable, with five minor volcanic eruptions, and lava dome construction between May and October 1980. After the eruptions ceased in the winter of 1980, the crater floor cooled down enough for snow and ice accumulation. Beginning with snowfall in the winter of 1980-1981, the glacier began to grow very rapidly in the shadow of the crater. The glacier thickened at a rate of as high as 50 ft (15 m) per year and advanced northward as much as 135 ft (41 m) a year. This glacier growth was discovered by scientists working in the crater about seven to nine years later. However, the existence of the glacier was not publicized until 1999. By 2004, Crater Glacier covered about 0.36 square mile (0.93 km^{2}), about 20% of the glacier area in the pre-1980 glaciers, and there was a western and eastern lobe flowing around the 1980s dome. Due to the gas emissions on the crater floor, there were glacier caves (ice caves) in the once smooth glacial ice, and several of them had been explored by the late 1990s.

With the volcanic activity from 2004 to 2008, the glacier lobes were pushed aside and overthickened by the growth of new volcanic domes. As the two streams of ice were compressed between the crater wall and the new lava domes, the ice moved rapidly downhill, much like the squeezing of toothpaste out of a container. This resulted in a very rapid advance of the glacier termini; first the western glacier arm merged with the rock glacier on the western crater wall and then, both arms of the Crater Glacier joined north 1980s lava dome in May 2008, despite the volcanic activity. In addition, the volcanic activity modified the surface of the glacier and transformed it from being mostly crevasse-free to being a chaotic jumble of icefalls heavily criss-crossed with crevasses and seracs due to movement of the crater floor and lava dome growth. At the south end, the new domes almost split the Crater Glacier into two separate glaciers and melted 10% in volume of the glacier's ice. However, cold rock on the edge of the glacier insulated the glacier ice from the 1,300 °F (700 °C) lava spewing out of the lava domes, easing concerns of a catastrophic lahar caused by glacier melting. The porous nature of the crater floor also reduced the amount of meltwater flowing out of the crater.

After the volcanic activity of the 2000s, the thickness of the glacier continues to increase at a slower rate of 15 ft (5 m) per year and the glacier continues to advance at 3 ft (1 m) per day. The latest aerial imagery taken in 2012 shows that the glacier has entered the upper reaches of the Loowit Creek canyon and the headwaters of the creek. Ice mixed with rock debris now spills into the canyon and the creek has been pushed to the east. Nearby, on the slopes of the eastern crater wall, the glacier touches one of the rock glaciers and the glacier is very close to merging with the other rock glacier. A medial moraine can be seen at the interface of the eastern and western arms of the Crater Glacier.

Glacier Evolution in the Crater

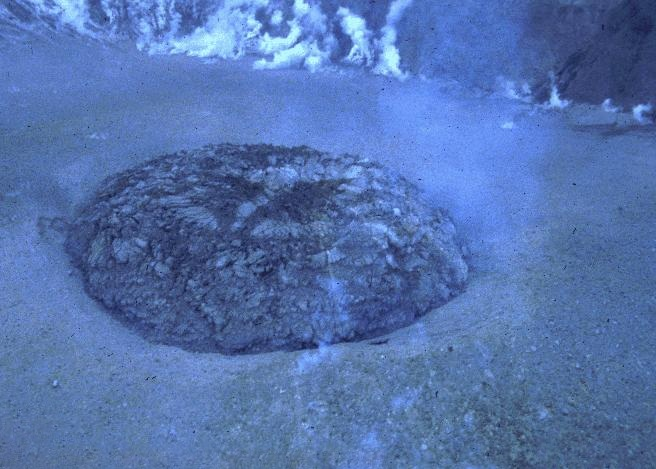
October 1980: The volcanically active and unstable crater floor months after the May 1980 Eruption, but before Crater Glacier was born via winter snowfall.

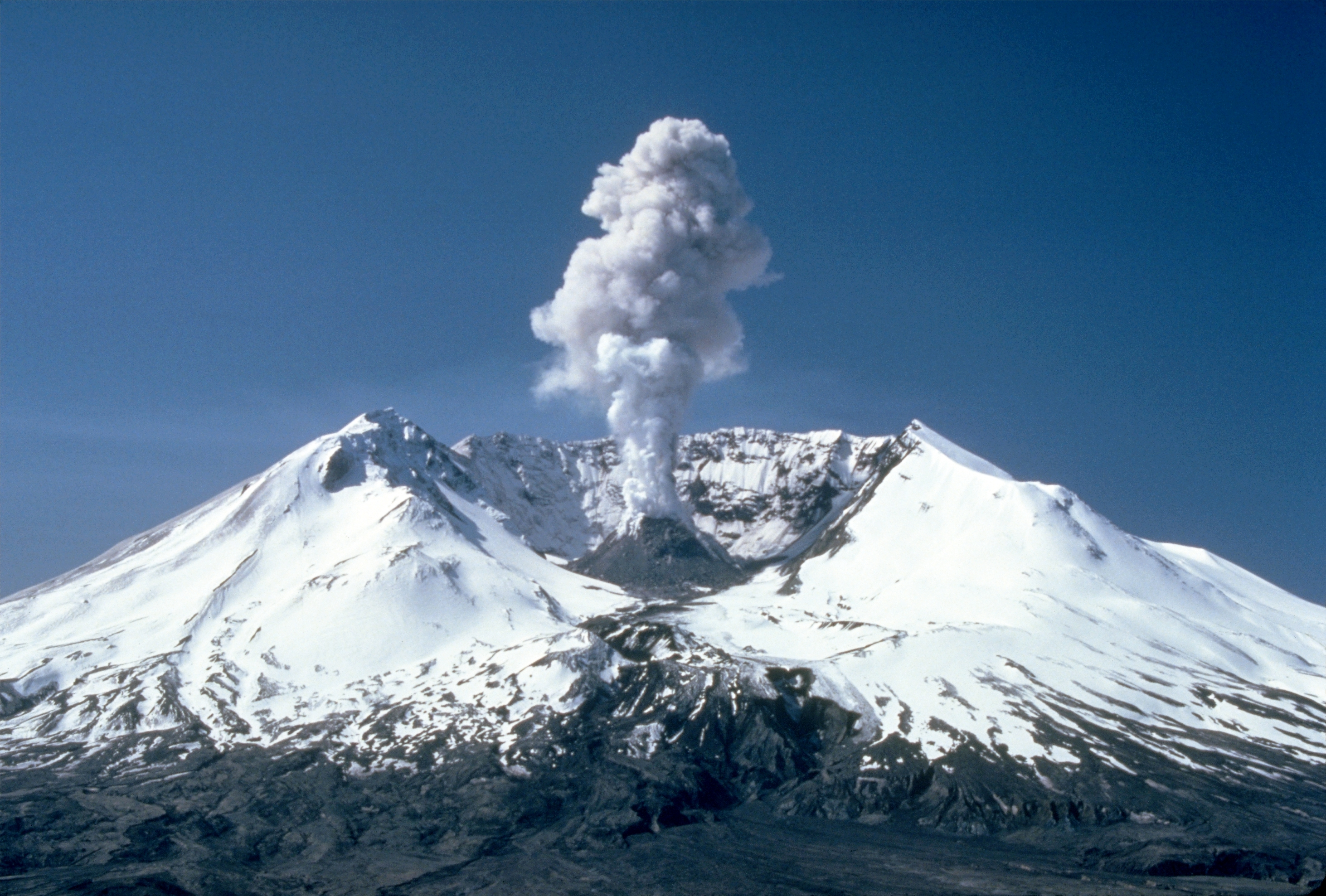
May 1982: Note the accumulation of snow in the debris aprons from repeated avalanches off the crater walls (behind the steaming 1980s lava dome, zoom in to view).

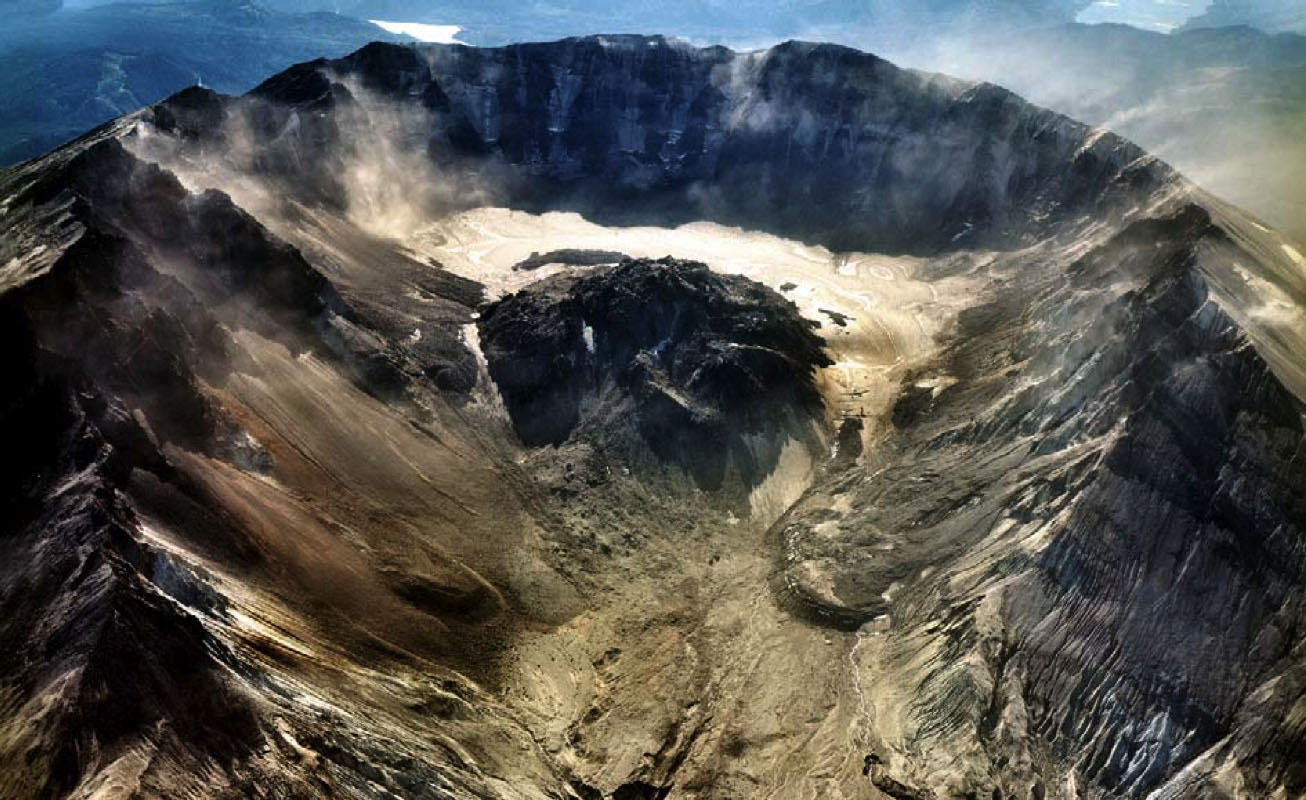
October 2000: The Crater Glacier from the north, prior to the 2004-2008 eruptive cycle.

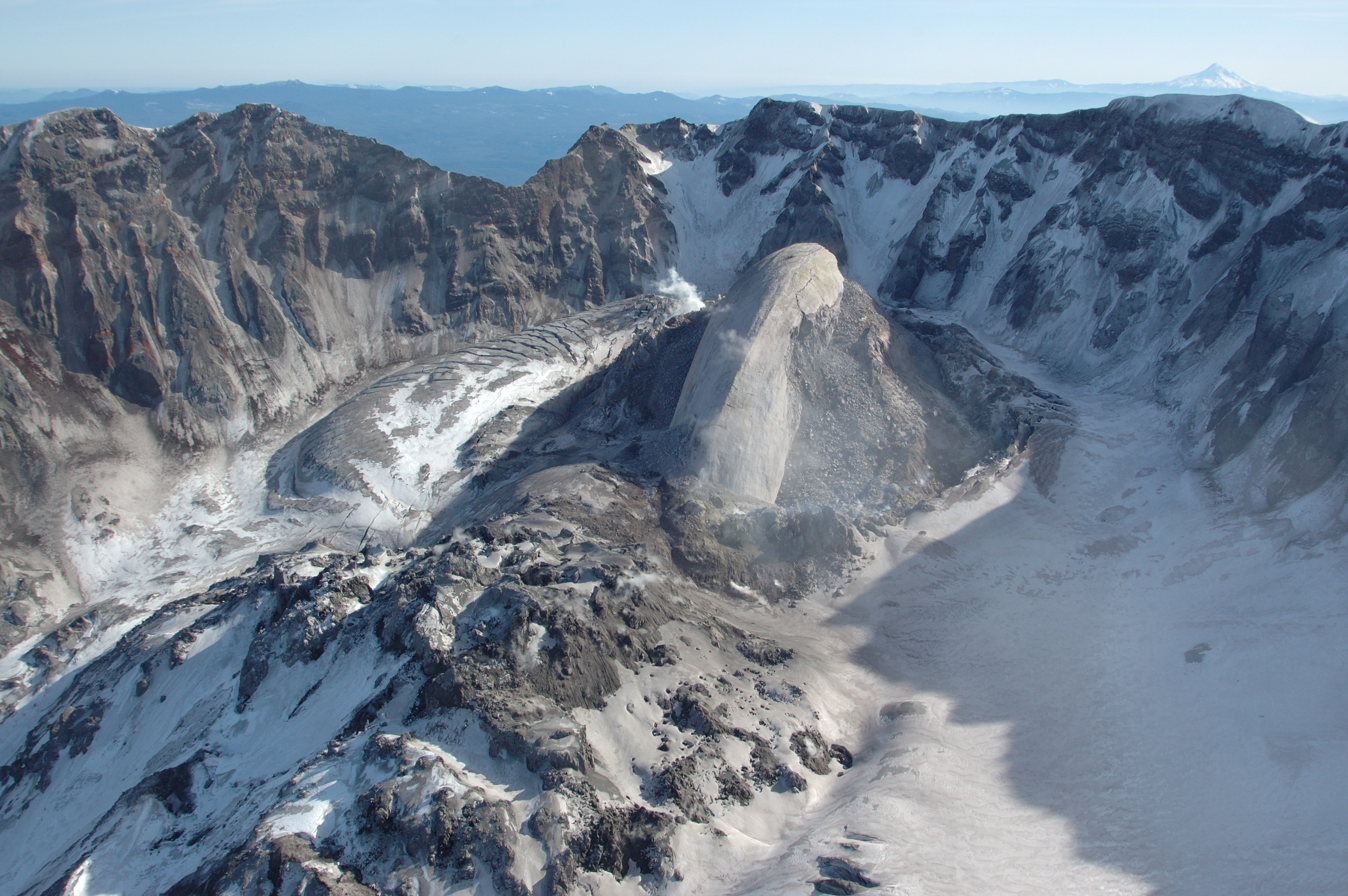
February 2005: The Crater Glacier nearly split at its south end by the new lava domes. Overthickening and compression of the eastern glacier arm is apparent.

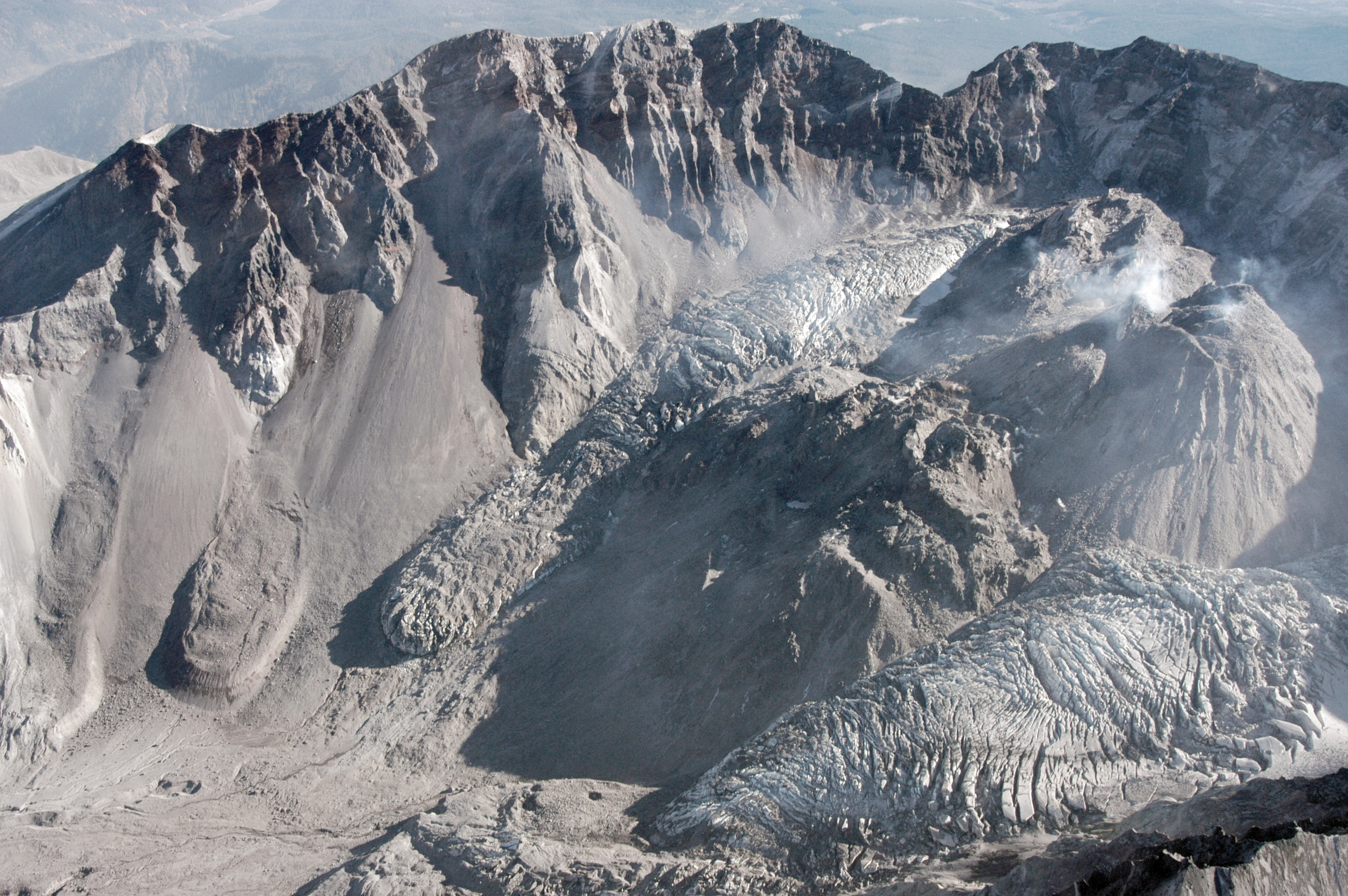
October 2006: Glaciers in the crater of Mount St. Helens. The Crater Glacier is shaped in a horseshoe around the new domes that have developed in the crater. The west lobe of the glacier is visible in the bottom right and two more rock glaciers can be seen to the left of the east lobe.

== Naming ==
Since the glacier was first observed to be forming and actively flowing in the late 1980s, most scientists working on the mountain have referred to it informally as the "crater glacier". That name has been in wide use with the public (at least those who were aware of the glacier's existence) for the two decades since the glacier formed, and has appeared in several scientific publications too. A single scientific paper, the most complete published study of the glacier to date, referred to it as the "Amphitheater glacier," but that name has not been used otherwise.

Despite numerous observations and publications about the growing glacier in the late 1990s and early 2000s, no move was made to give the glacier a permanent and official name until late 2004, after the current eruptive cycle began and the new dome began to split the glacier. At that time, a proponent from the Cowlitz tribe suggested the name "Tulutson Glacier," from the Cowlitz language word for ice. In March 2005, the Washington State Board on Geographic Names chose Tulutson over three other contenders (Crater, Spirit, and Tamanawas), and so Tulutson Glacier became the de facto name.

However, the U.S. Board on Geographic Names had yet to make its decision, which would be official throughout the United States. The name Tulutson Glacier was submitted for consideration, along with Crater Glacier and Kraffts Glacier, which would have honored the volcanologists Katia and Maurice Krafft, killed by a pyroclastic flow in 1991. In June 2006, the U.S. BGN chose Crater Glacier because of its two-decade precedent of common use, despite objections from the state of Washington and the United States Forest Service which both preferred Tulutson. The scientists at the USGS Cascades Volcano Observatory strongly supported Crater Glacier, and also commented that Tulutson may not be an appropriate name since the volcano "lies inland in a region where the native language was not Cowlitz but Sahaptin."

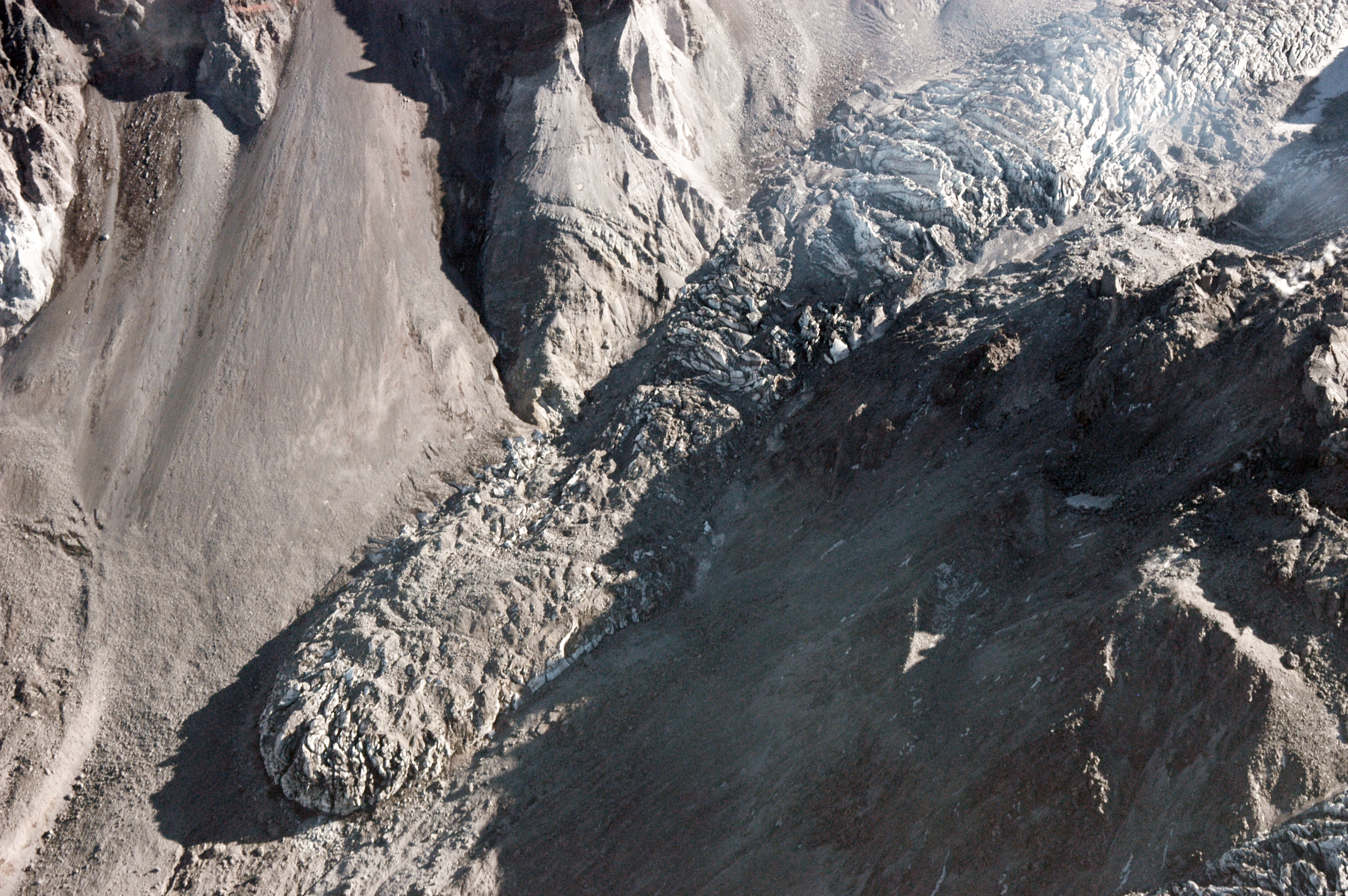
Icefall on east lobe of the Crater Glacier

After the decision, some controversy erupted following an editorial in a local newspaper protesting the decision, and the state of Washington "has indicated that the name Tulutson Glacier will continue to appear on State products, although if the feature melts soon, as is anticipated, this may not be a great concern." Despite these protests, the glacier's official name remained Crater Glacier, though shortly after their June 2006 decision, the BGN received a follow-up proposal to name the two arms of the glacier, East Crater Glacier and West Crater Glacier. This was because, at that point in time, the dome-building eruptions had nearly split the glacier into an east and west arm. No further action has been taken on this matter and the merging of the ice streams north of the 1980s lava dome has rendered this move unnecessary.

== See also ==
- List of glaciers
