= 2004–2008 volcanic activity of Mount St. Helens =

Volcanic eruption in Washington, United States

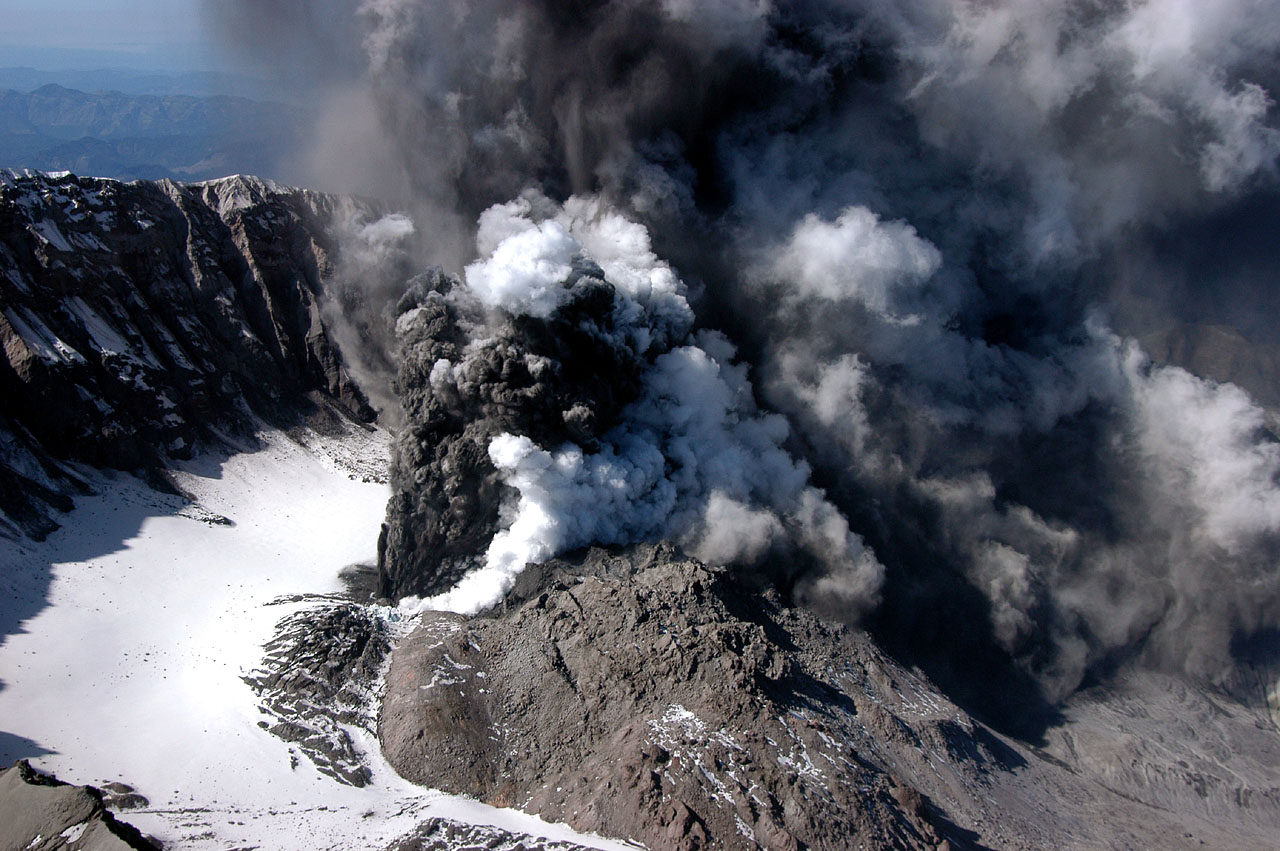
- Mount St. Helens sent a plume of volcanic ash and steam to 10,000 feet (3,000 m) above sea level in its October 1, 2004 eruption.
- Volcano: Mount St. Helens
- Start date: October 1, 2004
- Start time: 12:02 p.m. PDT
- End date: January 2008
- Location: Skamania County, Washington, U.S. 46°11′45″N 122°11′20″W
- VEI: 2

The 2004–2008 volcanic activity of Mount St. Helens in Washington, United States was a documented continuous eruption, which occurred in the form of gradual extrusion of magma. Starting in October 2004 and ceasing in January 2008, a new lava dome was built up. The new dome did not rise above the rim of the crater created by the 1980 eruption of Mount St. Helens.

== 2004 activity ==
On September 23, 2004, around 2:00 a.m. PDT, Mount St. Helens experienced an earthquake swarm, with about 200 small (less than magnitude 1) earthquakes occurring less than one-half mile (one kilometer) below the 1980s lava dome. Activity increased, and on September 26, the U.S. Geological Survey (USGS) and Pacific Northwest Seismograph Network issued a "notice of volcanic unrest", stating that a "hazardous event" was possible, and the U.S. Forest Service closed the mountain to all climbing. They also closed some trails in the area, due to the risk of debris flows from the possible melting of the Crater Glacier in the volcanic crater.

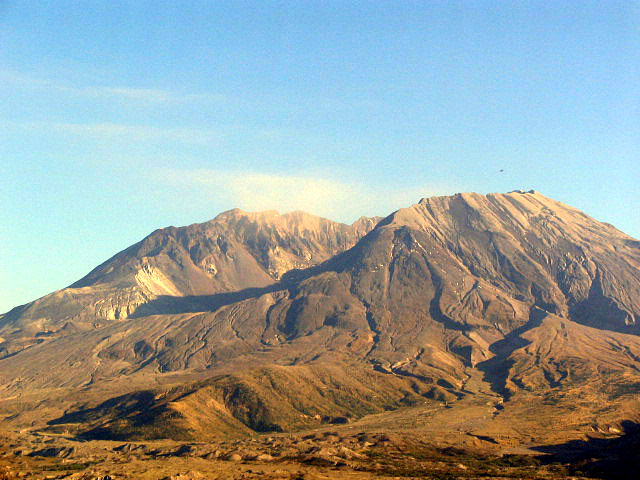
After releasing a cloud of steam on October 2, dust from landslides inside the crater could be observed for the rest of the afternoon.

Seismic activity continued to accelerate following the USGS advisory, with earthquakes approaching magnitude 2.5 occurring at a rate of about four per minute on September 29, prompting the USGS and Pacific Northwest Seismograph Network to issue a second advisory, increasing the "alert level" to the second of three levels, and warn of an increased likelihood of a steam explosion or eruption from the lava dome within the next few days. Such an event was expected to be relatively small and not pose a threat to regions beyond the immediate area of the mountain. However, the intensities and occurrences of the earthquakes continued to rise. The largest earthquake recorded was a magnitude 3.3.

At 12:02 p.m. PDT on October 1, 2004, the mountain erupted a plume of steam and volcanic ash about 9,700 feet (about 3 kilometers) into the air (according to pilot reports), from a vent in the then-unnamed Crater Glacier just southwest of the lava dome. The resulting ash plume was reported to have drifted south to Vancouver, Washington, Northern California and Wood Village, Oregon, dusting cars with a fine layer of black, sooty ash.

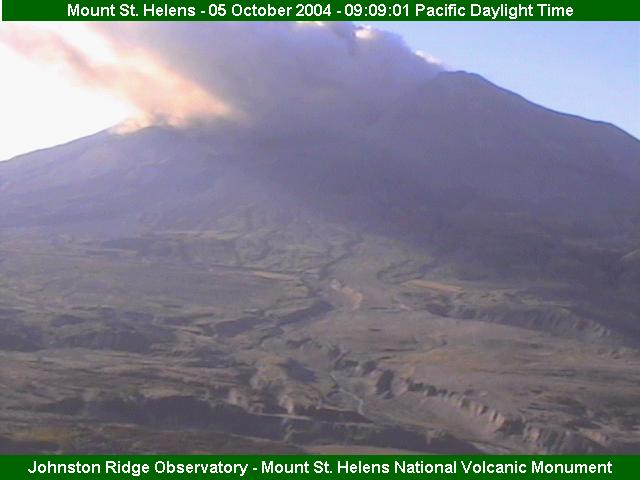
October 5: Steam and ash eruption, seen from the Johnston Ridge Observatory.

Mount St. Helens vented another plume of steam the next day at 12:14 p.m. PDT, which was stronger than the previous steam release. A low-frequency harmonic tremor followed the steam release, which led seismologists to raise the "alert level" to the third of three levels, indicating a potential threat to life and property. Accordingly, the Johnston Ridge Observatory overlooking Mount St. Helens was evacuated; television media established their bases at Castle Lake Viewpoint about nine miles (14 km) away, while tourists moved to various locations for several miles along State Route 504.

On October 3, low-frequency harmonic tremor activity began at around 3:00 a.m. PDT and lasted for up to 90 minutes, which may have indicated the movement of magma beneath the mountain. The tremors were followed by a steam release at around 10:40 a.m.

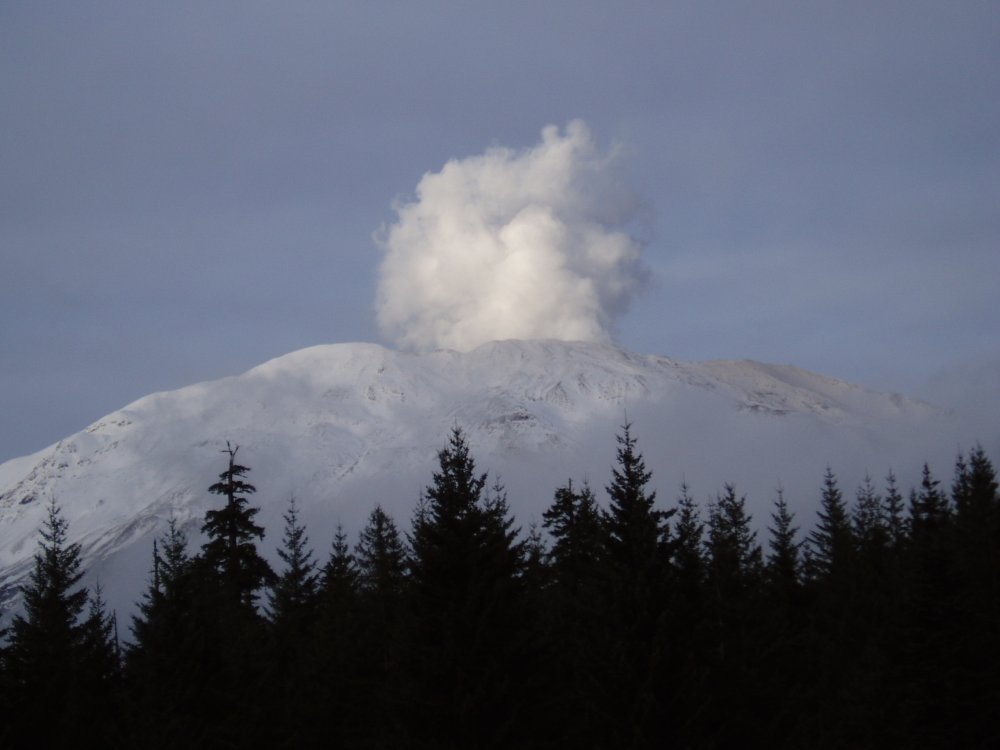
A steam plume rises from the mountain in December 2004

Mount St. Helens' eruptive activity continued over the following days, with steam releases occurring on October 4 at 9:47 a.m., 2:12 p.m., and at 5:40 p.m.; then again on the morning of October 5 at around 9:03 a.m., with an ash plume that dusted Randle, Morton, and Packwood, Washington, towns on or near U.S. Route 12 about 30 miles (48 km) from the volcano. Between steam releases, elevated seismic activity on the mountain continued with the strongest tremors remaining near magnitude 3.0.

On October 6, the U.S. Geological Survey announced that the alert level was being lowered, saying "We no longer think that an eruption is imminent in the sense of minutes or hours."

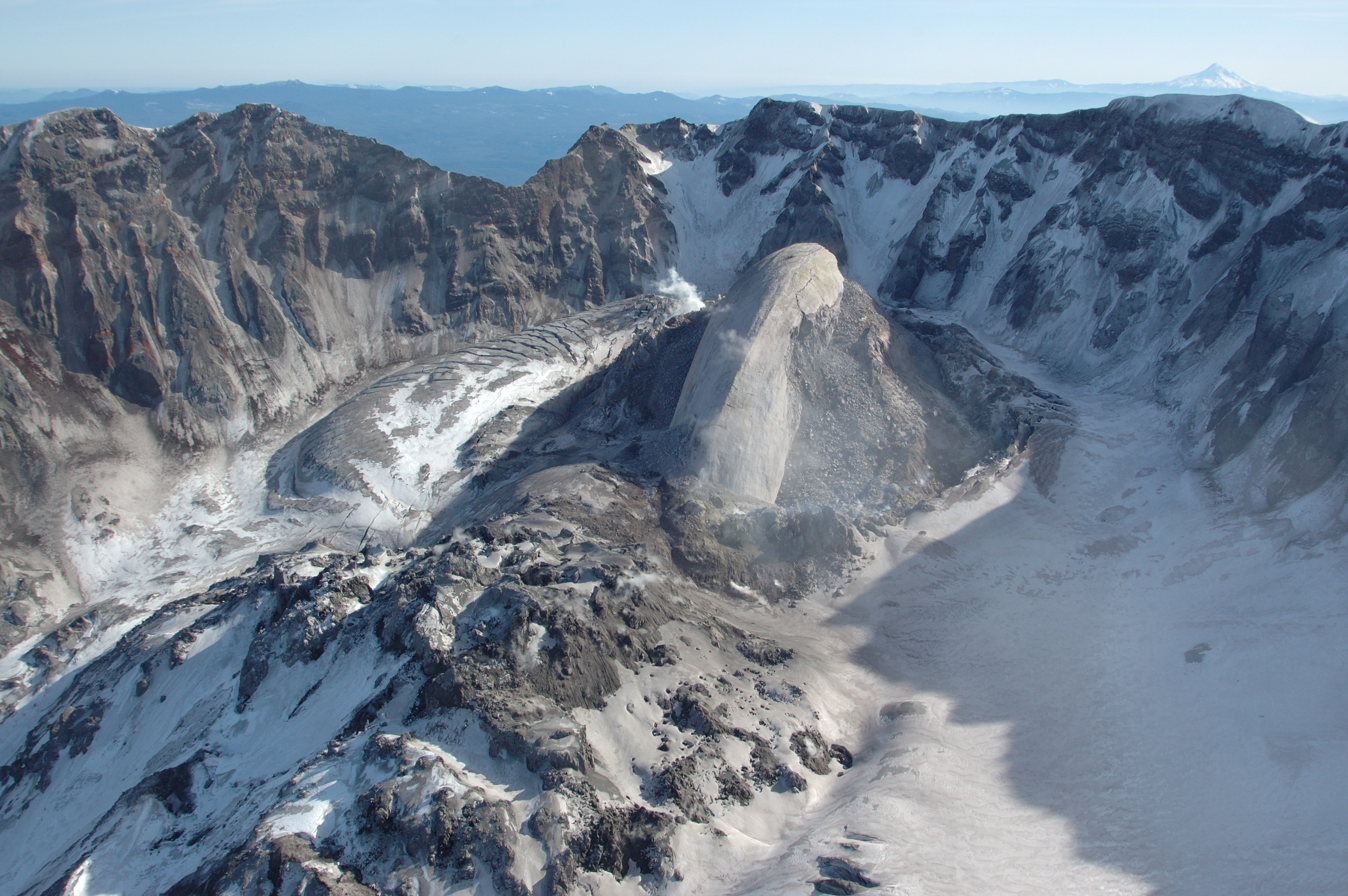
'Whaleback' feature on February 22, 2005.

Magma reached the surface of the volcano around October 11, resulting in the building of a new lava dome on the existing dome's south side. Dome building continued, with the USGS reporting in early November 2004 that magma was being extruded at a rate of 7 to 10 cubic meters per second. Had magma continued to extrude at this rate uninterrupted, the crater would have been completely filled and Mount St. Helens would have regained its former height in about eleven years. The Mount St. Helens VolcanoCam located at Johnston Ridge was able to view the new dome especially at night when the glow of new magma was visible via the camera's infrared capabilities.

Included in the new dome was a feature dubbed the "Whaleback" (named such because of its close resemblance to the back of a whale), which was a lava spine, a long shaft of solidified magma being extruded by pressure of magma underneath it. This feature was very hot but fragile. The edges of it began crumbling rapidly, forming loose material around the new dome. The rate of crumbling soon matched the rate of growth, with the size of the whaleback remaining fairly constant.

== 2005 activity ==
On February 1, 2005, the new lava dome on Mount Saint Helens measured 7,642 feet (2,329 m) in elevation. This brought its elevation to 1,363 feet (415 m) above the 1980 crater floor, approximately 2,000 feet (610 m) above the surface of the Crater Glacier, and 721 feet (220 m) below the highest point of the volcano. The whaleback feature measured approximately 1,550 feet (470 m) in length and 500 feet (150 m) in width. The diameter of the new dome was about 1,700 feet (520 m), and it contained about 50 million cubic yards (40 million cubic meters) of material. The total amount of glacier lost by this date was estimated to be 5–10%, but the flow of water from the crater was almost unchanged because the porous nature of the floor of the crater caused the water to be absorbed quickly.

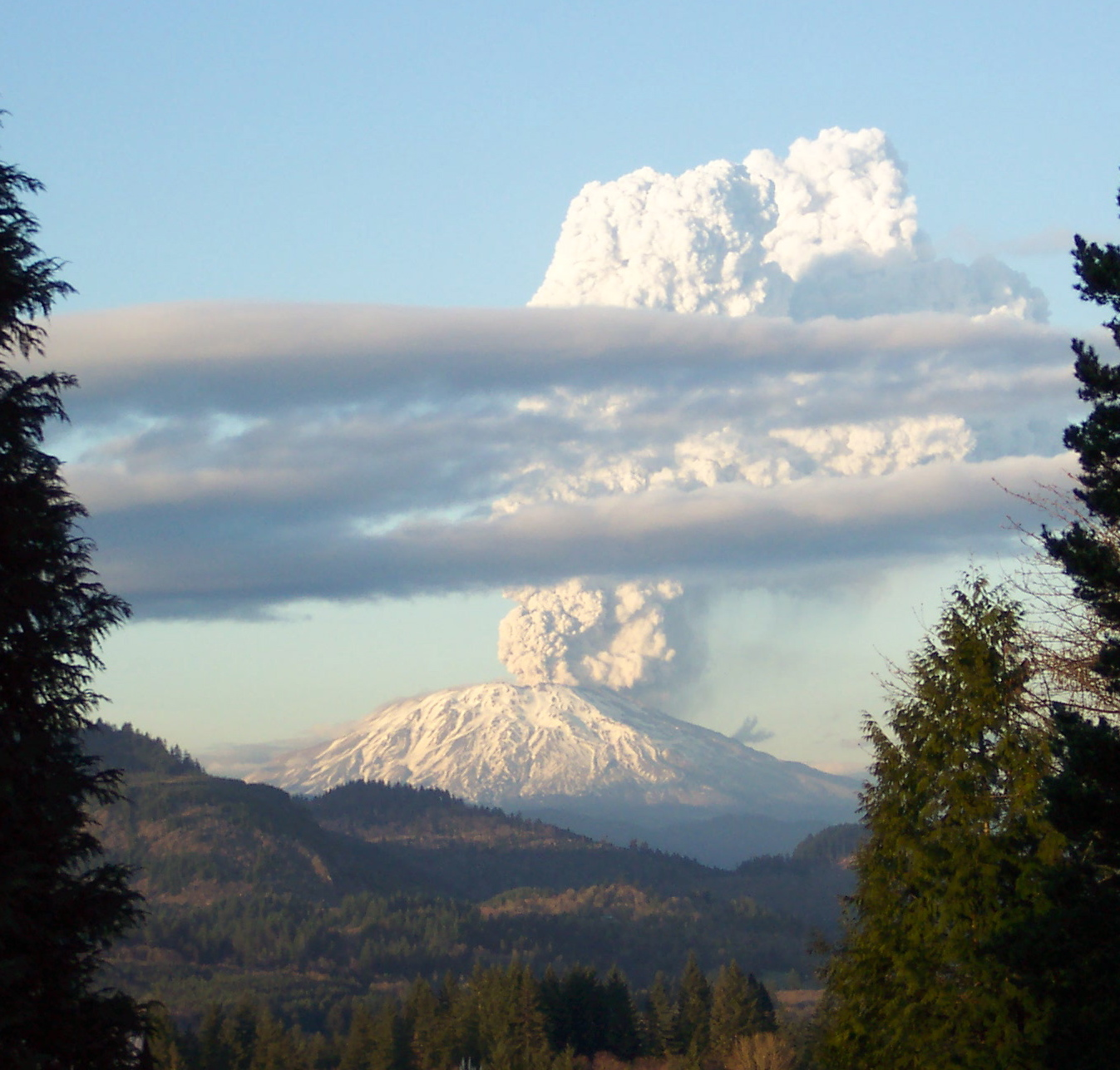
March 8, 2005 eruption

Mount St. Helens experienced major activity again on March 8, 2005, at about 5:30 p.m. PST, when a 36,000-foot (11 km) plume of steam and presumably ash was witnessed emerging from the volcano, accompanied by a tremor that measured about magnitude 2.5. The plume was visible from the metropolitan areas of Seattle, Washington, to Salem, Oregon, but only lasted for about 20–30 minutes. Ash was reported falling from the sky in Yakima, Washington, and surrounding areas. This activity was not considered a large eruption but merely a minor release of pressure consistent with the nature of dome building. Scientists believed it was triggered by a partial collapse of the lava dome. There was no increase in quake activity before the volcanic event.

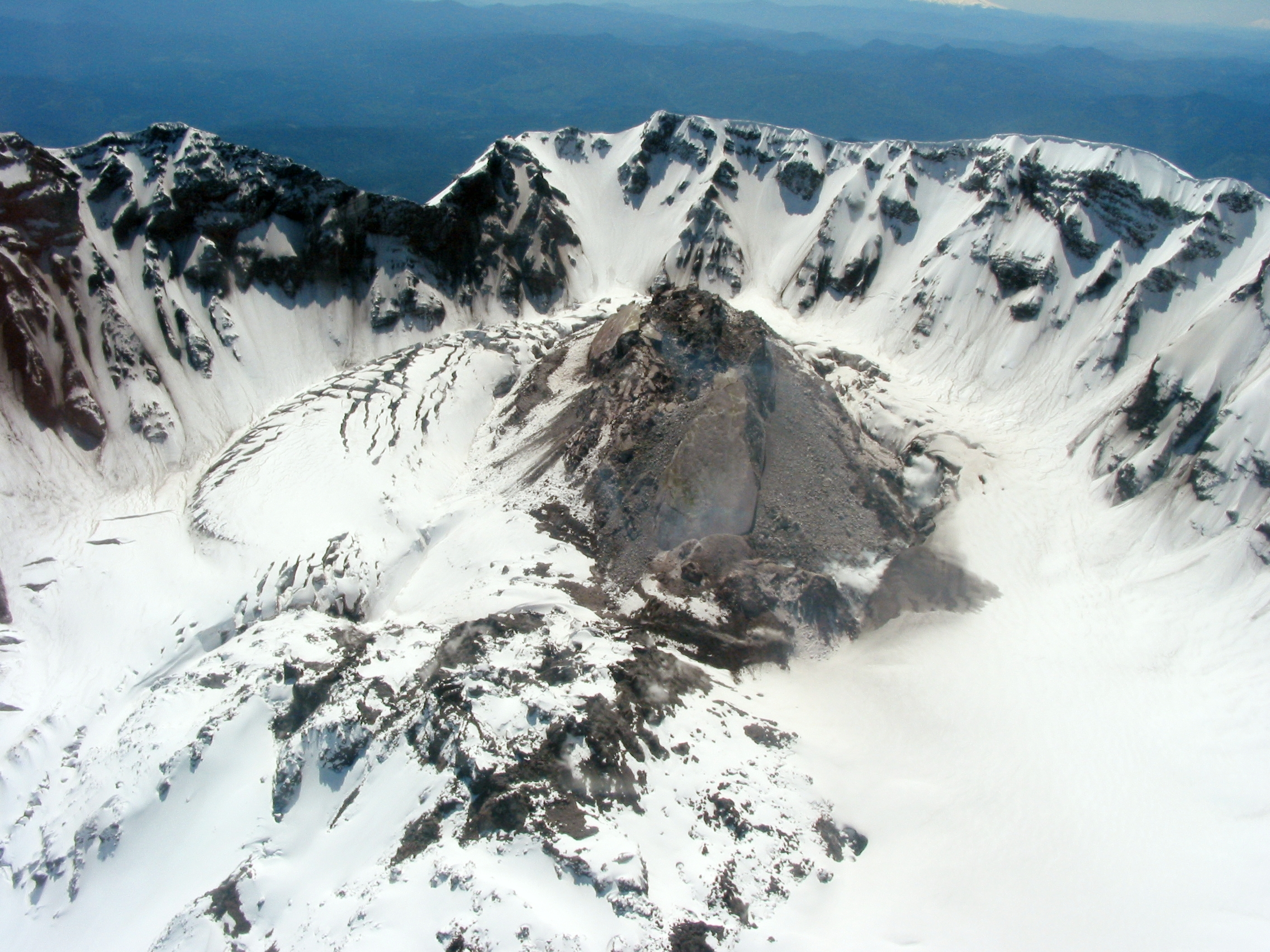
New dome on May 25, 2005.

By May 5, 2005, the highest point on the new dome was 7,675 feet (2,339 m), 688 feet (210 m) below the highest point of the volcano. It contained approximately 58 million cubic yards (44 million cubic meters) of material. Growth of the new dome continued steadily, and small earthquakes continued to be observed every few minutes. The whaleback feature disintegrated steadily but continued to be extruded as solidified lava pushed upward from below.

On July 2, 2005, the tip of the whaleback feature broke off, causing a rockfall that sent ash and dust several hundred meters into the air.

== 2006 activity ==
Following the collapse of the dome and whaleback, a new feature, termed the "slab", began growing. Approximately the size of a football field, the large, cooled volcanic rock was being forced upward as quickly as 6 feet (1.8 m) per day, though the top part of the slab would usually collapse on a daily basis, under its own weight.

On July 21, 2006, the crater rim was reopened to hikers.

On December 19, 2006, an eruption sent a steam plume billowing over Washington.

== 2008 activity ==
After a relatively quiet 2007, on January 16, 2008, USGS geologist John S. Pallister spotted steam seeping from the lava dome in Mount St. Helens' crater. At approximately the same time, the Pacific Northwest Seismograph Network recorded a magnitude 2.9 earthquake, followed by a small tremor that lasted for nearly ninety minutes, and a magnitude 2.7 earthquake. But by the end of January, the lava dome growth had stopped. On July 10, 2008, it determined that the eruption that began in 2004 had ended, after 5 months of inactivity.
