= Międzygórze, Lower Silesian Voivodeship =

Międzygórze
- Village
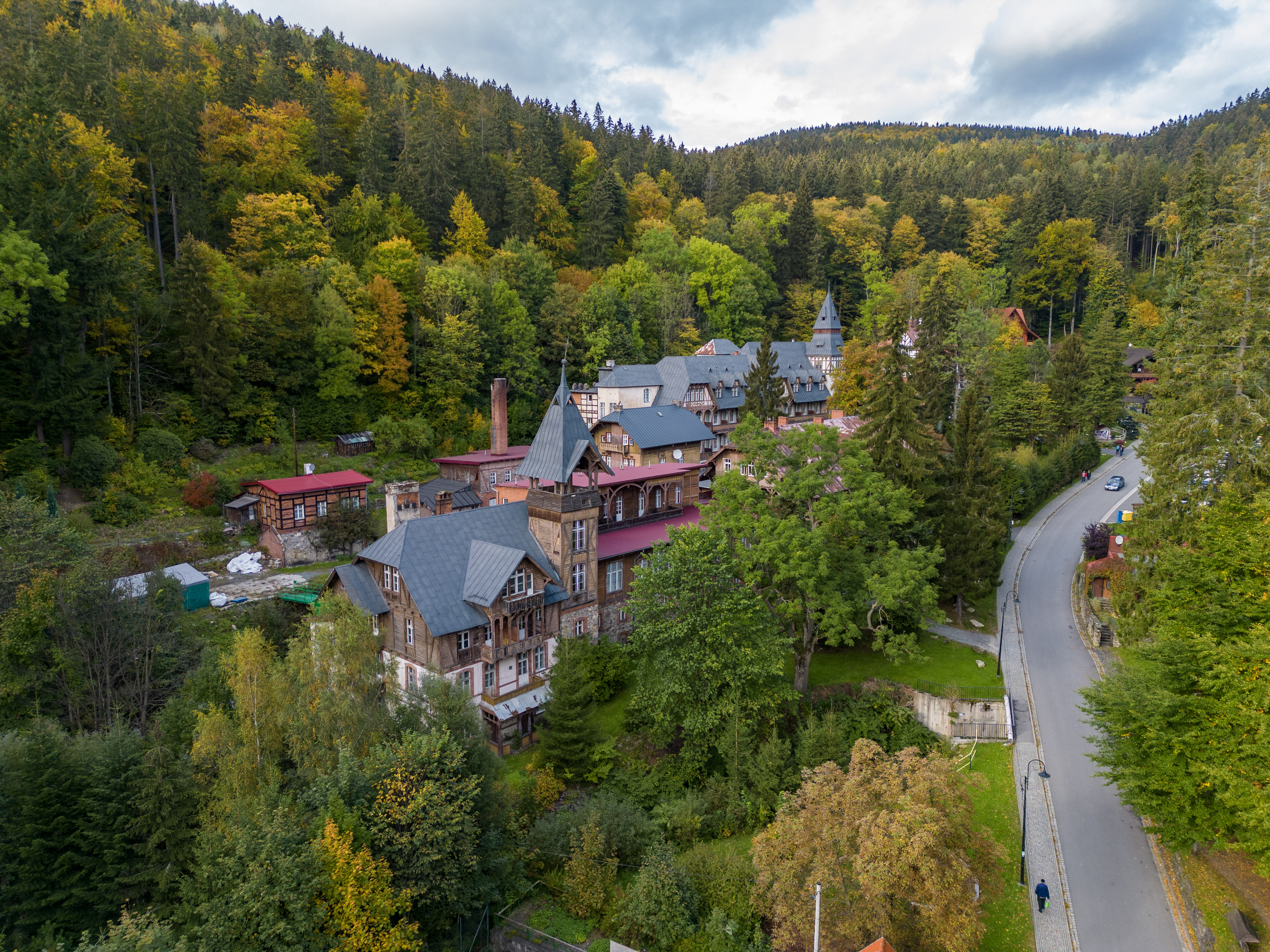

- Location within Poland
- Coordinates: 50°13′41″N 16°46′0″E
- Country: Poland
- Voivodeship: Lower Silesian
- County: Kłodzko
- Gmina: Bystrzyca Kłodzka
- Highest elevation: 680 m (2,230 ft)

Population
  - Total: 700
- Time zone: UTC+1 (CET)
  - Summer (DST): UTC+2 (CEST)
- Vehicle registration: DKL

Międzygórze ([mjɛnd͡zɨˈɡuʐɛ]; German: Wölfelsgrund; Czech: Vlčí Důl) is a village in the administrative district of Gmina Bystrzyca Kłodzka, within Kłodzko County, Lower Silesian Voivodeship, in south-western Poland.

The Wilczki Falls is located in Międzygórze.

== Notable residents ==
- Rudolf Jaenisch (born 1942), German scientist

== Gallery ==
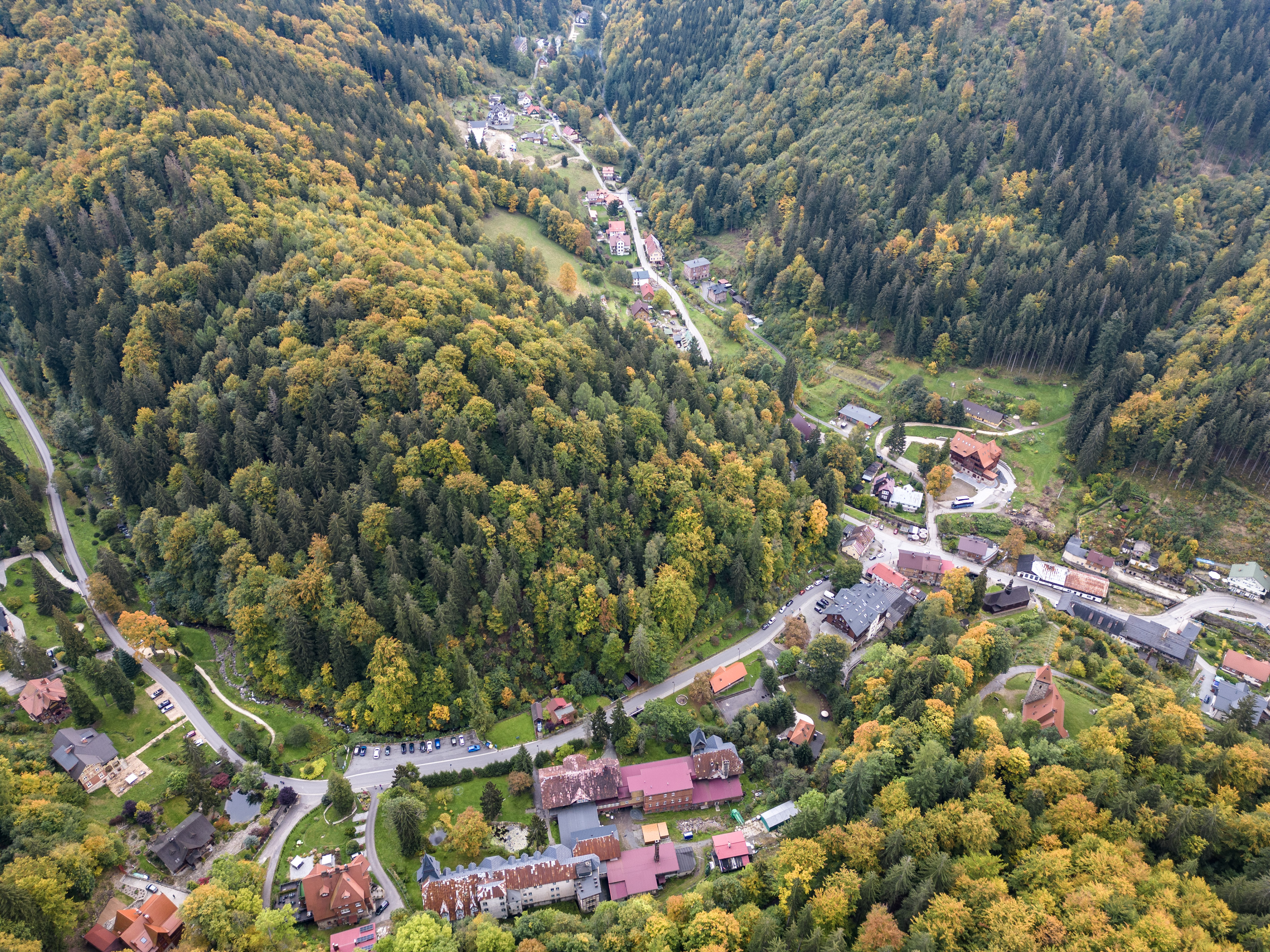
Aerial view

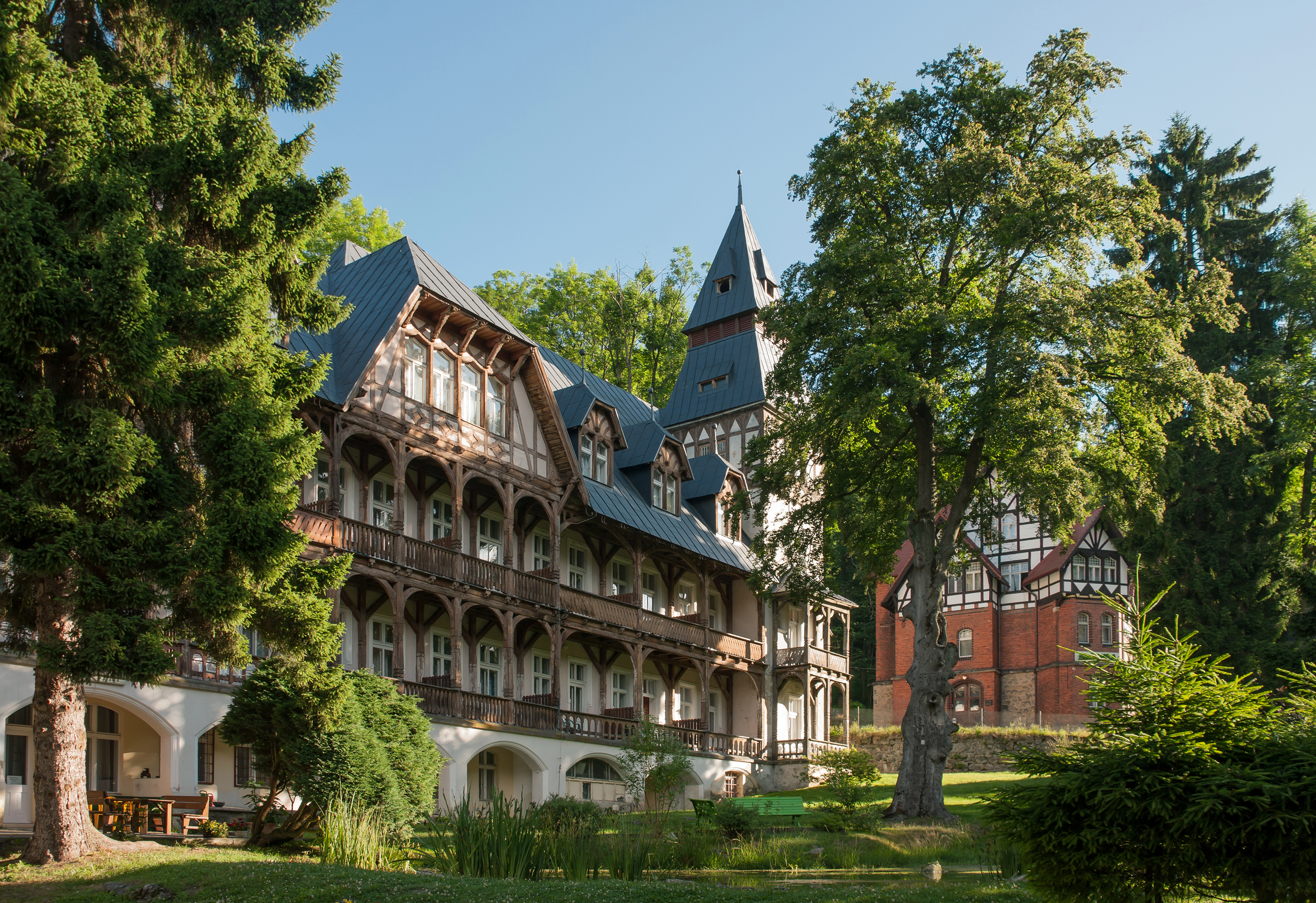
Sanatorium Gigant

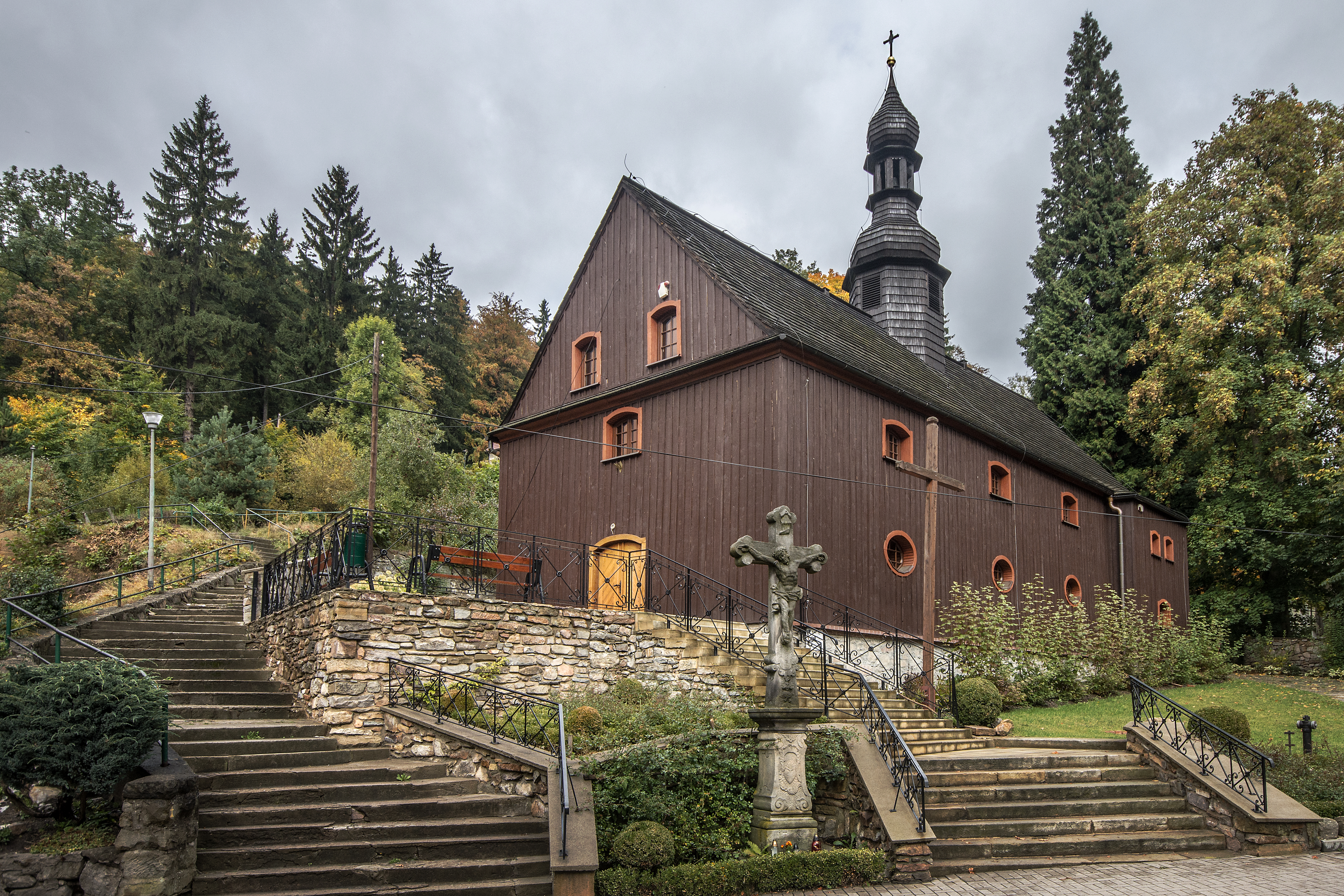
Saint Joseph church

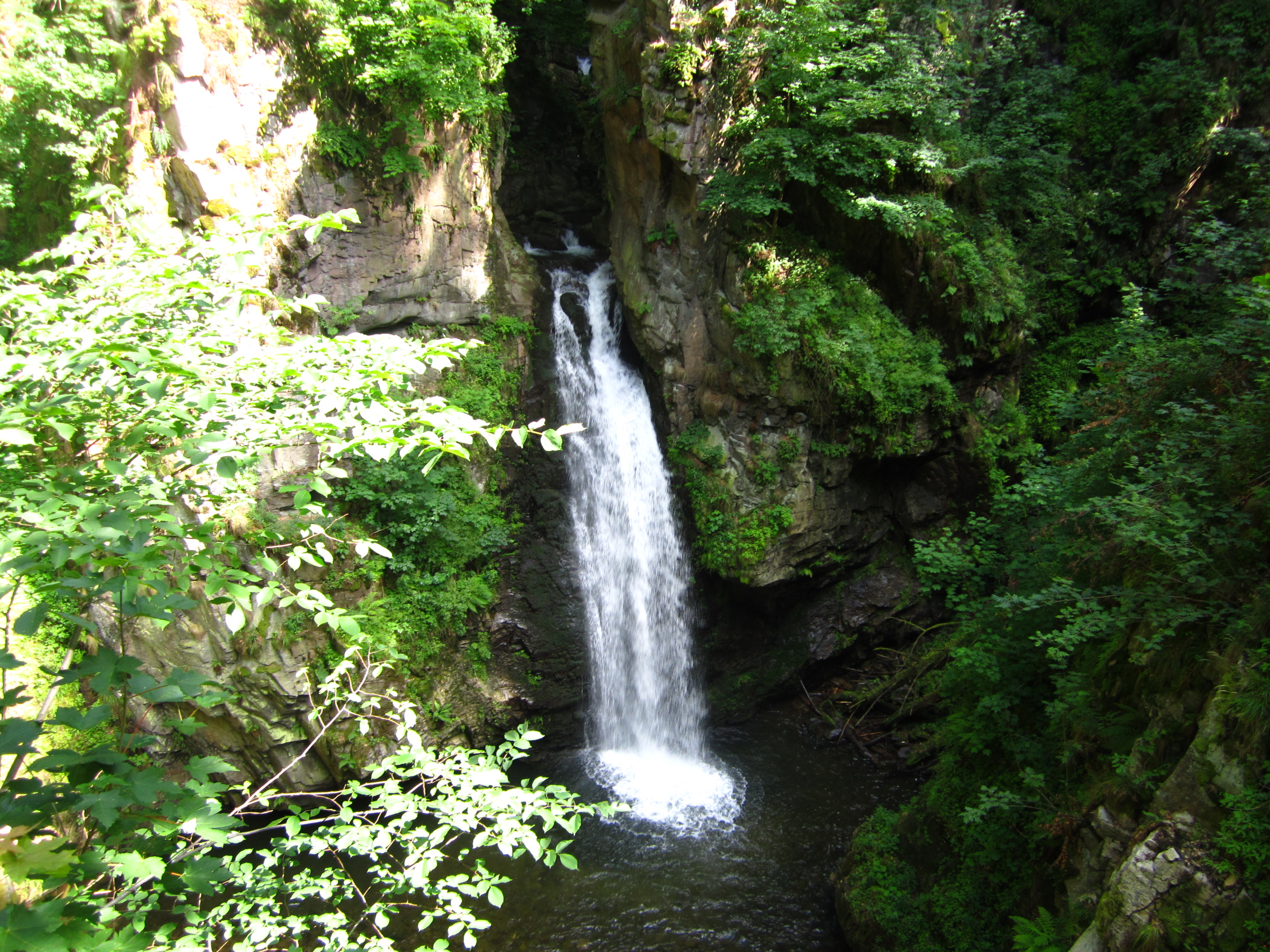
Wilczki Falls
