= Icefall =

Relatively fast part of a glacier with chaotic crevassed surface

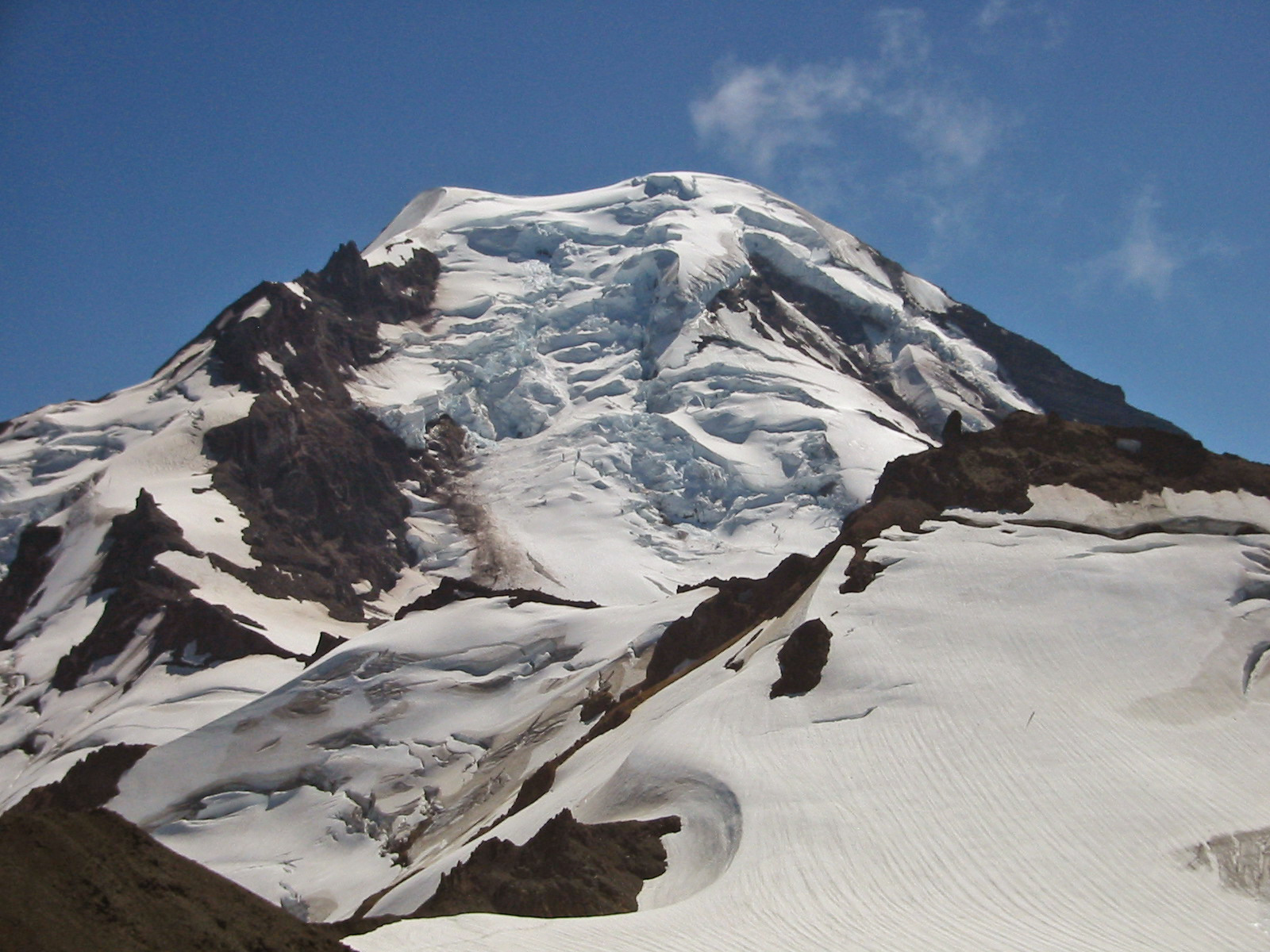
The 730 m (2,400 ft) icefall (center) in the Roosevelt Glacier, Mount Baker, Washington, U.S.

An icefall is a portion of certain glaciers characterized by relatively rapid flow and chaotic crevassed surface, caused in part by gravity. The term icefall is formed by analogy with the word waterfall, which is a similar phenomenon of the liquid phase but at a more spectacular speed. When ice movement of a glacier is faster than elsewhere, because the glacier bed steepens or narrows, and the flow cannot be accommodated by plastic deformation, the ice fractures, forming crevasses. Where two fractures meet, seracs (or ice towers) can be formed. When the movement of the ice slows down, the crevasses can coalesce, resulting in the surface of the glacier becoming smoother.

== Ice flow ==
Perhaps the most conspicuous consequence of glacier flow, icefalls occur where the glacier bed steepens or narrows. Most glacier ice flows at speeds of a few hundred metres per year or less. However, the flow of ice in an icefall may be measured in kilometres per year. Such rapid flow cannot be accommodated by plastic deformation of the ice. Instead, the ice fractures, forming crevasses. Intersecting fractures form ice columns or seracs. These processes are imperceptible for the most part; however, a serac may collapse or topple abruptly and without warning. This behavior often poses the biggest risk to mountaineers climbing in an icefall.

As the glacier transitions below the icefall, the topography of the glacier bed plays a crucial role in modifying its dynamics, leading to a flatter or wider bed that significantly reduces the velocity of ice movement. This change in speed and pressure causes crevasses to close up, resulting in a smoother glacier surface that presents fewer challenges for navigation and traversal.

== Examples ==
Icefalls vary greatly in height. The Roosevelt Glacier icefall, on the north face of Mount Baker (Cascade Range, U.S.), is about 730 metres (2,400 feet) high. The ice cliff of the left side of the ice fall and above the debris covering the glacier is 20 to 40 metres (66 to 131 ft) high. Typical of mountain glaciers, this icefall forms as the ice flows from a high elevation plateau or basin accumulation zone to a lower valley ablation zone. Much larger icefalls may be found in the outlet glaciers of continental ice sheets. The icefall feeding the Lambert Glacier in Antarctica is 7 kilometres (4.3 miles) wide and 14 kilometres (8.7 miles) long, even though the elevation difference is only 400 metres (1,300 feet), a little more than half that of the Roosevelt Glacier icefall.

Icefalls are climbed because of their beauty and the challenge they pose. In some cases, an icefall may provide the only feasible or the easiest route up one face of a mountain. An example is the Khumbu Icefall on the Nepalese side of Mount Everest, variously described as "treacherous" and "dangerous." It is about 5,500 metres (18,000 feet) above sea level.

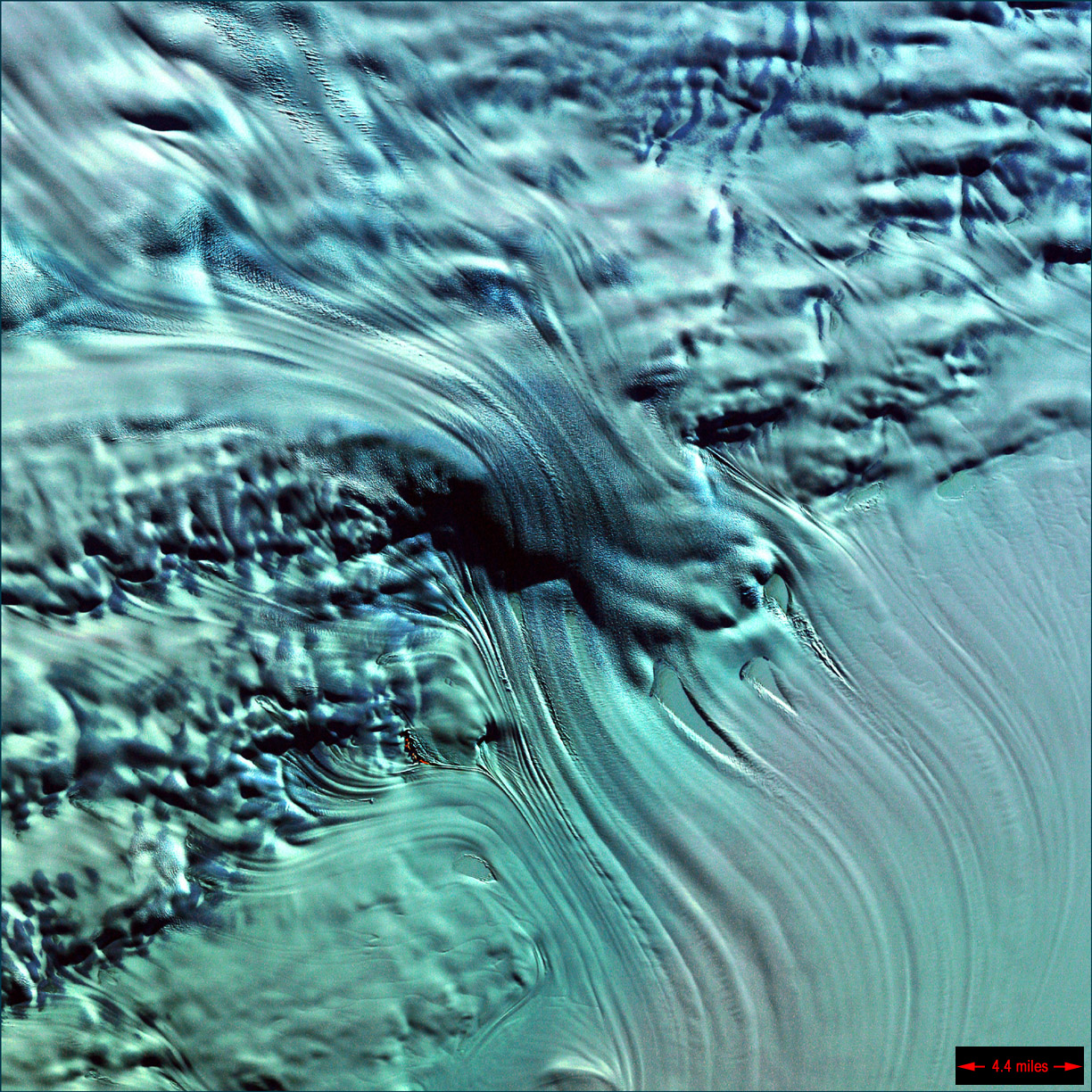
An icefall feeding into the Lambert Glacier, Antarctica.

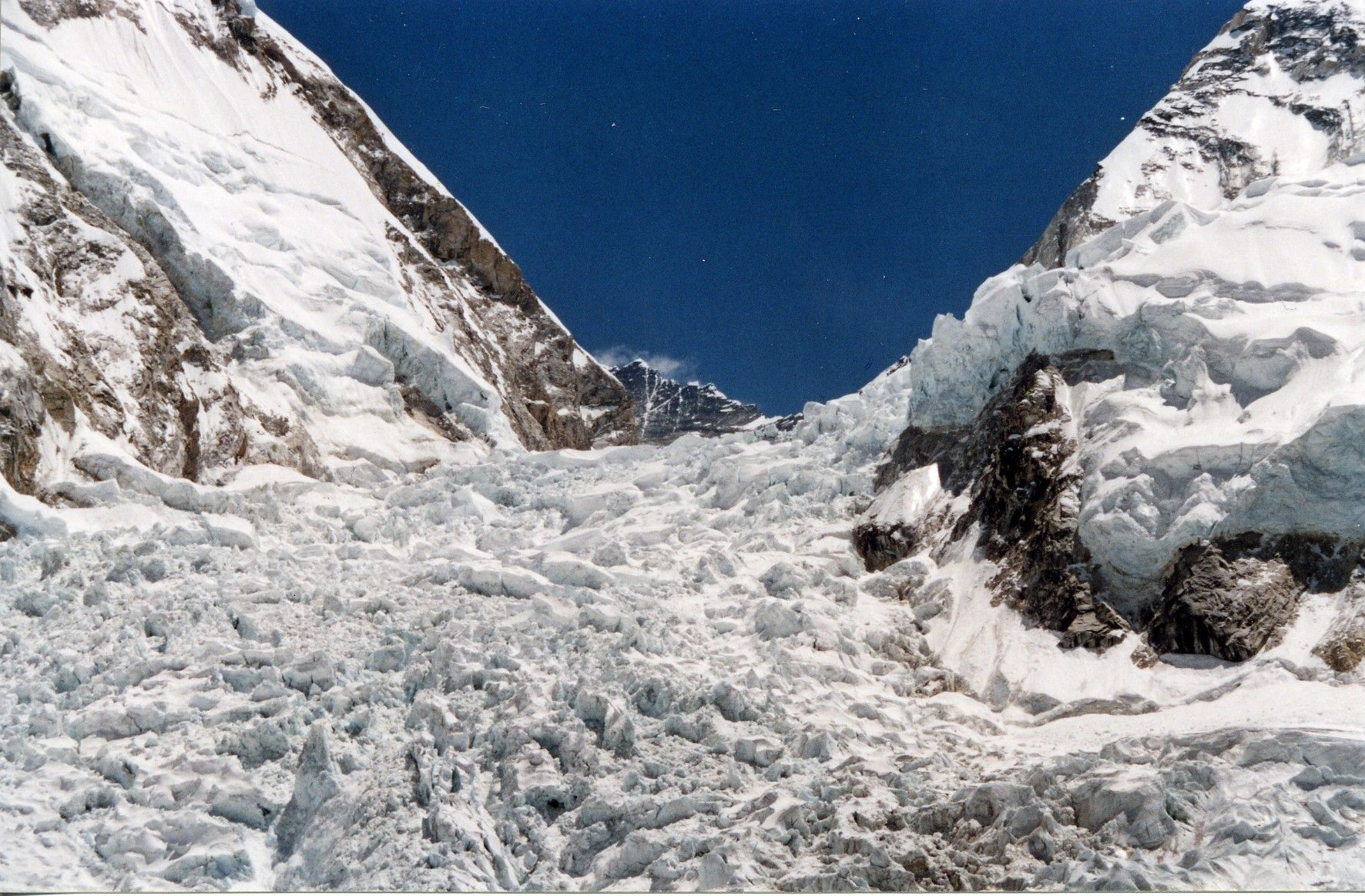
The Khumbu Icefall on Mount Everest

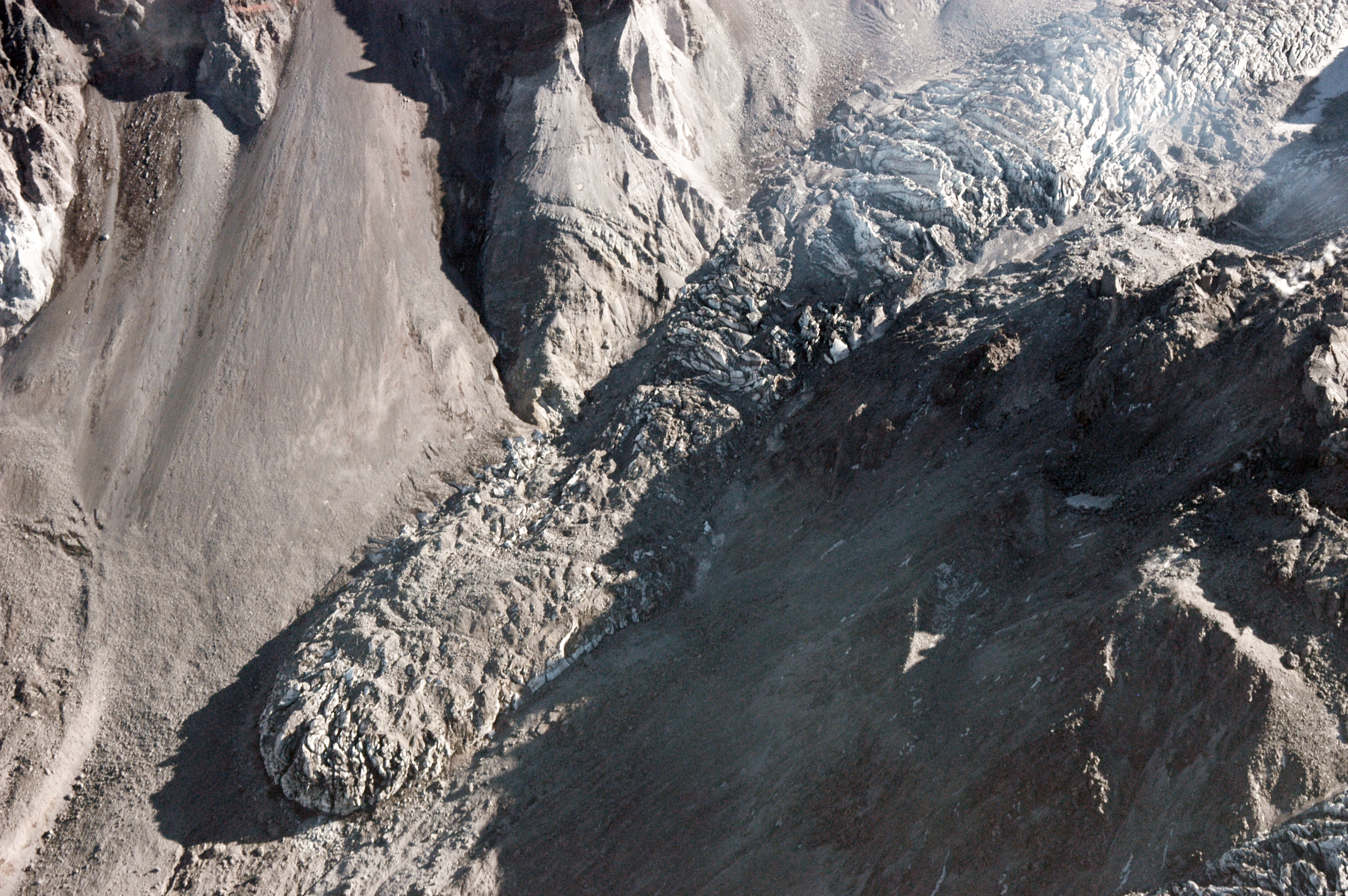
A small icefall on east lobe of the new Crater Glacier on Mount St. Helens.

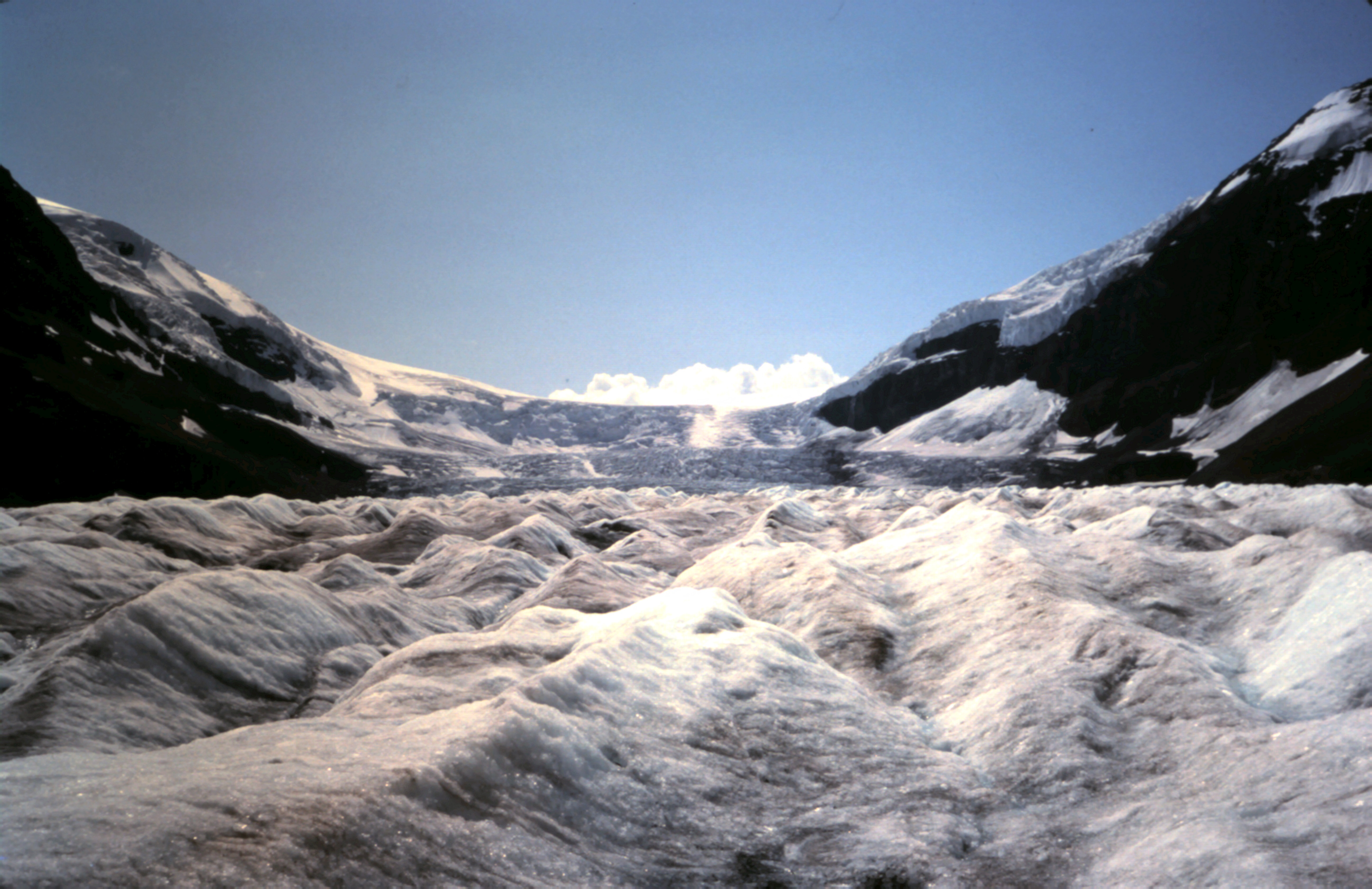
An icefall on Athabasca Glacier, Columbia Icefield, Jasper National Park, Alberta.

== See also ==
- Glacier morphology
