= Mendel Polar Station =

Czech research station in Antarctica

J.G. Mendel Czech Antarctic Station Česká vědecká stanice Johanna Gregora Mendela
- Antarctic station
- Johann Gregor Mendel Czech Antarctic station
- Location of Mendel Station in Antarctica
- Coordinates: 63°48′02″S 57°52′56″W
- Country: Czech Republic
- Location in Antarctica: James Ross Island; Graham Land; Antarctic Peninsula; Antarctica
- Administered by: Masaryk University
- Established: 22 February 2007
- Named after: Gregor Mendel
- Elevation: 10 m (33 ft)

Population (2017)
  - Summer: 20
  - Winter: 0
- Type: Seasonal
- Period: Summer
- Status: Operational
- Activities: List: Botany; Climatology; Geocryology; Glaciology; Limnology; Hydrology; Microbiology
- Website: Polar Research at Masaryk University

J.G. Mendel Czech Antarctic Station (Czech: Česká vědecká stanice Johanna Gregora Mendela) is a Czech research station in Antarctica on the coast of James Ross Island. It was founded by Czech polar explorer Pavel Prošek. The official opening ceremony took place in February 2007 and made the Czech Republic the 26th country to have its own scientific base on the continent. The station is the property of Masaryk University in Brno and was named after the father of modern genetics, the meteorologist Gregor Johann Mendel. Thanks to the research carried out at the station, the Czech Republic is one of the countries who have a voting right in the Antarctic Treaty System.

== History ==
=== First efforts ===
A plan to build a Czech polar station first appeared in the 1960s. It was driven partly by political interests of the Soviet Union, but mostly by an effort to expand the biological, glaciological, climatological and geological research in Czechoslovakia. However, the efforts to build the station came to an end at the beginning of the 1970s due to a lack of funding. At the same time, interest in investing into research in such a distant and unusual location began to wane.

The interest started to grow again in the 1980s on the part of the Czech Geological Institute (now Czech Geological Survey). At the same time, they chose a location where the base was to be built: in the eastern part of Antarctica on Prydz Bay. (Later on, Australia, Russia, and China all built their stations in this area.) However, the project was cancelled again despite sufficient funding. This time, it failed to find a federal institution willing to support it and submit the plan for approval to the Federal Assembly, as required; even the Academy of Sciences of the Czech Republic issued a negative decision.

=== Looking for alternatives ===
In 1994 a group of Czech researchers from Masaryk University, Academy of Sciences of the Czech Republic, University of South Bohemia in České Budějovice and Czech Hydrometeorological Institute set out to King George Island to carry out research at the Polish station, which is one of eight stations located in that area. This cooperation continued until 1997. However, working at a foreign station proved to be unsuitable due to conflicts between the individual research teams. Afterwards, it was proposed to build a common station of the countries of the Visegrád Group (the Czech Republic, Slovakia, Poland and Hungary). However, this proposal was later rejected due to problems with the distribution of funding among the countries.

The research activities of Masaryk University and the Academy of Sciences of the Czech Republic in Antarctica continued between 1999 and 2004. As there was still no Czech station (even though preparations for construction were already under way), the research was carried out at the stations of the United Kingdom and Ukraine.

=== Construction plans ===
The first site chosen for the future Czech station was Turret Point, which is located close to King George Bay on King George Island, approximately 200 kilometres (120 mi) north of the current location. In 2001 the proposed location was submitted to the Committee for Environmental Protection at a conference in Saint Petersburg. However, the proposal was refused, primarily due to the number of existing stations in the area and a proposal submitted by other countries to declare the area protected. There was also the option of using one of the mothballed British stations, but none of them met the needs of the Czech scientific expedition. Therefore, a new location was chosen and presented at the next Committee conference, which took place in Warsaw. This time, the proposed location of the station was approved without any further problems. The location was at the northern tip of James Ross Island and it is the place where the station was finally built. The ice-free surroundings and large distance from other station – the closest one is the Argentinian Marambio Base, more than 70 kilometres (43 mi) to the south-east – were the most obvious benefits of this location. The project documentation of the station was completed during the next conference of the Committee for Environmental Protection in 2003, but it was refused due to changes made after the deadline. It was approved the following year, with almost no changes to the scope of construction, at a conference in Cape Town. The transport of material to the future location of the station started already in autumn 2004.

=== Pre-construction preparations ===
The structure of the station had to meet two requirements: minimum energy consumption and minimum environmental burden for the surrounding area. The main principles for the construction of the station included:

- Providing sufficient facilities for work, research, equipment, and leisure, as well as sanitation facilities and facilities for cooking and eating;
- Minimising the risk of fire and accidents;
- Using suitable construction materials (especially with regard to thermal insulation and resistance to corrosion);
- Using environmentally friendly sources of electricity (the sun and the wind);
- Providing a fresh water supply from a glacier stream;
- Ensuring suitable and sufficiently environmentally friendly waste disposal.

== Location ==
The station is located at 63°48′02.3″ S, 57°52′59.9″ W on James Ross Island near the coast of the Antarctic Peninsula. This peninsula juts out from mainland Antarctica to the north towards the southern tip of South America. The first sailor to reach James Ross Island was probably James Clark Ross in the 19th century, who called it "Haddington Land". (Note: According to) It was not until the winter of 1902/1903 that the expedition led by Otto Nordenskjöld found out that Haddington Land is actually an island and called it James Ross Island in honour of its discoverer. They also named the Strait separating it from the mainland the Prince Gustav Channel. It is an area with low concentration of polar stations; the closest station is the Argentinian Marambio Base on Seymour Island. The Mendel Polar Station building and facilities are located on the northern coast of James Ross Island, on a slightly stony beach about 80–100 metres (260–330 ft) from the shoreline at an altitude of 9 metres (30 ft) between the Bibby Point and Cape Lachman headlands. It faces the Prince Gustav Channel, which is 10–20 kilometres (6.2–12.4 mi) long and used to be covered by a permanent layer of ice that disintegrated in the summer of 1994. However, it is still full of ice floes and pieces of icebergs, so ship transport remains complicated (as of 2010).

The whole north-western part of the island – Ulu Peninsula – represents one of the largest ice-free areas of Antarctica. Up to 80% of the island area is free of ice. Thanks to a rain shadow cast by the Antarctic Peninsula, the annual precipitation is low – about 300 millimetres (12 in) –and the occasional snowfall quickly melts and is absorbed into the ground. This is because the station is located on a marine terrace formed by compact fine sand (Regolith). In 2008, the minimum temperature was −35 °C (−31 °F) and the maximum temperature was 12.5 °C (54.5 °F) (mean −4.6 °C (23.7 °F)); the minimum humidity was 71.2% and the maximum humidity was 88.1% (mean 81%).

The specific location of the station was chosen based on three main criteria:

1. Can be reached by boat or helicopter from the nearest surrounding polar stations;
2. Landing areas are suitable with view to logistics;
3. Diverse surrounding area allows the broadest possible range of research activities.

== Construction ==
=== Transport of material ===
Structural elements and parts of the infrastructure needed for the station were produced in 2001–2002 in the Czech Republic. During the preparations phase, some parts were assembled and tried out to reduce on-site construction time and eliminate potential problems. Transport of construction material started in November 2004. The material was sent first to Hamburg and then to the Punta Arenas port in Chile. The plan was to transport everything from there directly to James Ross Island, but the transport was fraught with problems: the first ship, Antarctic Dream, could not set out at all due to its poor technical condition and the second one, Porvenir I., had an accident close to the Port on its way to the loading site. The third attempt, which used a Chilean military Icebreaker, Oscar Almirante Viel, finally succeeded.

=== Construction works ===
The icebreaker approached the construction site in the morning of 24 February 2004. During the two days that followed, eight containers weighing together 130 tonnes (286,601 pounds) were unloaded from the ship. Construction works started as soon as the ship was unloaded. This first delivery of material was used to build almost the whole main building, which was then used to store materials for further construction. The construction took place towards the end of the Antarctic summer and lasted seven days. As the first delivery did not contain all the necessary construction materials and systems, the main building and surrounding containers were winterised and the construction activities continued the following year. For Antarctica, weather conditions were very favourable during the construction, but the temperature was still between −8–+6 °C (18–43 °F) and the winds reached 120 kilometres per hour (75 mph), sometimes blowing incessantly for several days.

=== Opening ceremony ===
After all the necessary preparations, the station was inaugurated and christened on 22 February 2007. The members of the scientific team, a representative from the Czech embassy in Argentina and the dean of the Faculty of Science at Masaryk University all attended the ceremony.

=== Construction funding ===
The project was financed by the Ministry of Education, Youth and Sports of the Czech Republic and owned by the Masaryk University. The whole complex was built by the PSG-International company from Zlín, which was chosen in a tender. The station construction costs amounted to approximately 60 million Czech crowns (€2,1M as of February 2007).

== Base ==
=== Individual buildings ===
Compared to other older Antarctic bases, the station is rather small and stands out among the often overlarge buildings previously built in Antarctica by other countries. The design of the whole complex revolves around the Climate conditions in the area. The main building is a one-storey Wooden structure (26.5 by 11.5 metres (87 ft × 38 ft), 2.8–3.6 metres (9.2–11.8 ft) high) used for accommodation, cooking, and eating as well as for leisure and research activities. There are twelve single or twin rooms, two shared studies, a dining room, a small kitchen, sanitary facilities, and a drying room. There is a grating made of Oak railway sleepers embedded in the shallow foundations of the building; this structure is no less than 40 centimetres (16 in) above the ground to reduce Heat losses caused by the cold Antarctic soil. The walls are 265 millimetres (10.4 in) thick and they are built using the K-Kontrolsystem. They consist of two oriented strand boards with insulation filling in between the boards. The external surface of the walls is covered with Plywood to protect the structure from adverse effects of the environment (sea salt aerosol, occasional Dust storms). The floor and the ceilings are constructed in a similar way, but they are thicker – 320 millimetres (13 in). The roof slopes to the south at a pitch of 5% and is covered with a PVC board, which protects the building from Ultraviolet radiation.

There are nine containers around the main building measuring 6 by 2.5 by 2.6 metres (19.7 ft × 8.2 ft × 8.5 ft), which have been converted to storage places for engine generators and spare parts, garages, a waste incinerator and a power generator. Attached to the containers are wind turbines that can be folded if the wind is too strong. The fact that the individual structures are scattered around in the area decreases the risk of a fire or an environmental disaster.

=== Operation ===
The station is seasonal and is only operated during the summer months, with about 20 people working at the station. Heating and obtaining drinking water would be difficult outside the summer season: the water would have to be obtained by melting snow, requiring a large amount of diesel oil. The station features a well thought-out system of Alternative energy sources that decreases the consumption of diesel oil in the summer months. Solar thermal collectors covering a wall area of 36 square metres (390 sq ft) are installed on the northern side of the building, which receives the most solar radiation, and are capable of heating the air up to 55 °C (131 °F). The hot air is blown inside the building, keeping the indoor temperature at 17–19 °C (63–66 °F). Originally, there were also flat plate collectors heating water for the kitchen and the bathroom during warm days attached to the wall. However, the capacity of these collectors was found to be insufficient; they were removed and Solar cells producing electric energy were installed in their place. Electricity is also produced by eight 1.5 kW wind turbines; the energy they produce can be stored in NiCd batteries. The rest of the required electric energy is produced by diesel generators. Depending on the weather, sources of renewable energy provide 60–90% of the energy consumed by the station. The station uses the Argentinian time zone UTC−3.

Water is obtained from a nearby stream; however, as the stream occasionally freezes over in February and March, water is also stored in special containers inside the building. Communication with the outside world is possible thanks to the Bender satellite technology system based on the Inmarsat network and developed in cooperation with the Faculty of Electrical Engineering at the Czech Technical University in Prague. It allows data exchange at a speed of up to 492 Kbit/s. The station equipment also includes a ramp and a waste water disposal system discharging treated waste water into the sea. The design of the station and all its systems fully respects all environmental requirements and regulations listed in the appendix to the Antarctic Treaty (Protocol of Environmental Protection in Antarctica).

The annual cost of operating the station is 11 million Czech crowns and is mostly covered by the Czech Ministry of Education, Youth and Sports; the rest is paid by the Masaryk University. In case of sudden withdrawal of funds or budget cuts – as in 2015, when only six researchers could leave for the station – the missing finances should be provided by the Czech Antarctic Foundation, which was founded in 2014 and is led by the founder of the Czech polar station Pavel Prošek.

== Research ==
The location of the station had not been researched before the station was built, even though the area is attractive for the type of projects that are the focus of the Czech research in Antarctica. From geological perspective, it is an area of chalk sediments rich in fossils with occasional intrusions of igneous rock. Volcanic activity often took place below the glaciers. The consequences of climate change have been observed in this area since the mid 20th century in the retreat of glaciers and colonisation of the exposed surface by non-vascular plants. Many organisms are completely new to science and there is a high share of endemic species. The freshwater lakes in the surrounding area contain interesting and hitherto uninvestigated communities of algae, cyanobacteria and simple animal species.

The research projects in the area had started before the construction of the station and included geological research led by the Czech Geological Survey as well as climatological and geomorphological research led by the Masaryk University Faculty of Science. As the construction was nearing completion, the Faculty of Science of the University of South Bohemia in České Budějovice and the Institute of Botany at the Academy of Sciences of the Czech Republic started a joint botanical project of cyanobacteria research. The MU Faculty of Science also prepared a research project focused on ultraviolet radiation in the area; besides UV radiation, the project also studied Ozone layers. The area surrounding the station was also geologically mapped by the Czech Geological Survey. There has been basic ornithological research as well; however, the Nesting season of most birds starts in mid November, while ornithologist usually arrive at the station only at the beginning of January. Ichthyological research focused on fish in coastal waters and their parasites and there was also a study on the Gammarus genus focused on how animals detect the magnetic field. The bacteriological research has described new species of Bacteria. One of the projects assessed the stress of polar researches during their stay at the station and the extent to which their bodies accommodated to the conditions in Antarctica, while another project studied ageing of plastic materials in the extreme Antarctic weather. Institutions from other countries, such as the Instituto Antártico Argentino, Instituto Nacional Antártico Chileno, British Antarctic Survey, Servicio Meteorológico Nacional Argentina, and Nederlands Instituut voor Ecologie also participate in the research. Available spots at the station are offered to researchers and students at both Czech and foreign universities and research institutions.

== Another "Czech" station ==
Nelson Island, which is one of South Shetland Islands, is the location of Eco-Nelson polar station[26] founded in 1988[26] by another Czech polar explorer, Jaroslav Pavlíček. However, this station hosts international research[27] and is therefore not considered a Czech station.

== See also ==
- List of permanent Antarctic research stations
- List of Antarctic field camps
