= Growler Rock =

Rock formation in the South Shetland Islands

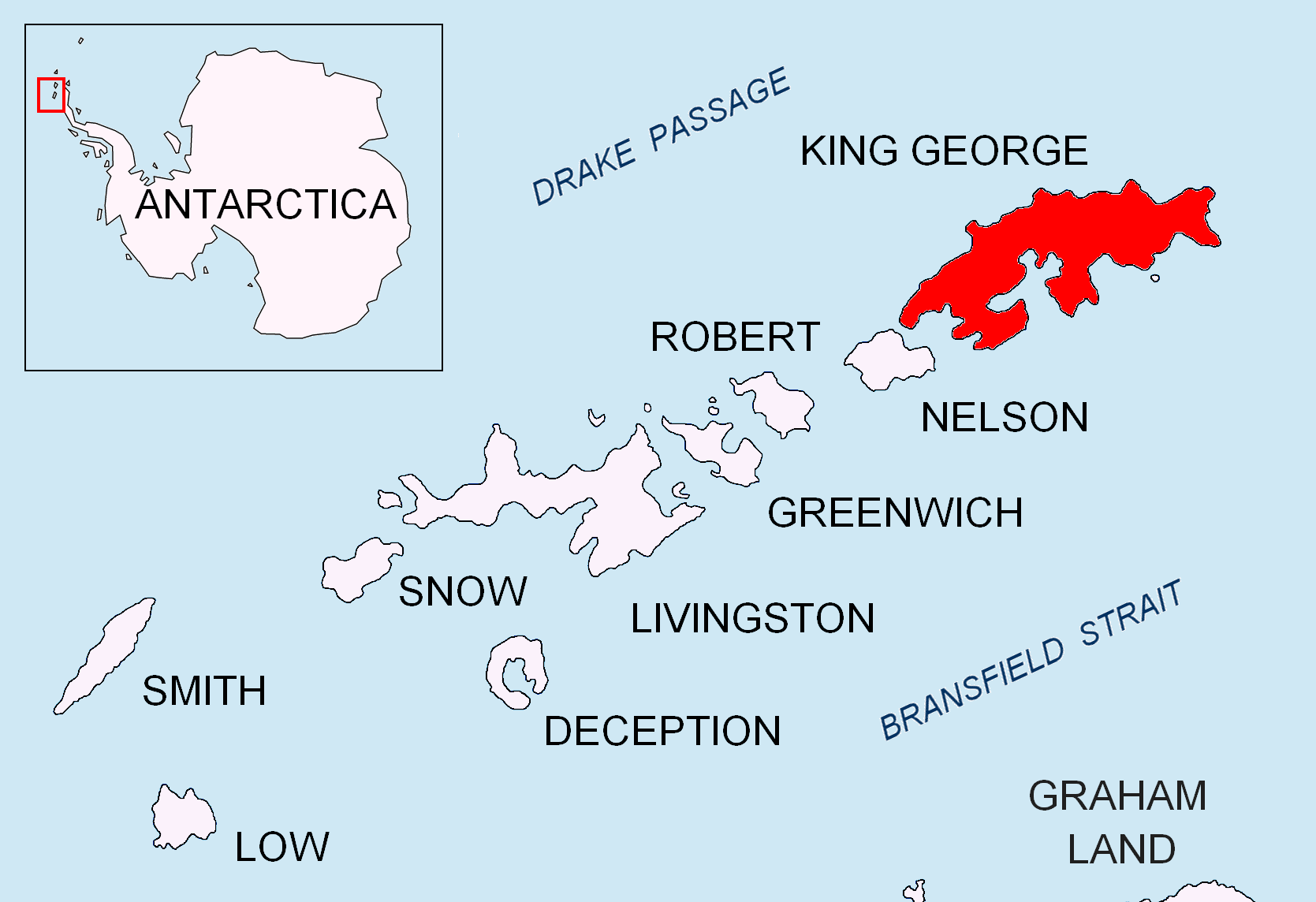
Location of King George Island in the South Shetland Islands.

Growler Rock (62°7′S 58°8′W) is a rock 1 nautical mile (2 km) northwest of Lions Rump in the western part of King George Bay, King George Island, in the South Shetland Islands. It was charted and named during 1937 by Discovery Investigations personnel on the Discovery II. The term "growler" is used to denote small pieces of ice barely showing above water.
