= Boy Point =

Boy Point (62°10′S 58°11′W) is a headland between Cinder Spur and Low Head on the south coast of King George Island in the South Shetland Islands. It was named by the Polish Antarctic Expedition in 1980 after Tadeusz Boy-Żeleński (1874–1941), Polish writer and essayist.

== See also ==
- Wesele Cove
