= Milos (disambiguation) =

Milos is a Greek island.

Milos may also refer to:

- Miloš (also Milos and Milosz), a masculine given name and a surname
  - Milos Milos (1941–1966), Serbian-born American actor, stunt double and bodyguard
- Milos (regional unit), a Greek regional unit
- SS Milos (1878), one of three ships chartered in 1940 to take Jewish refugees from Romania to Palestine—see Patria disaster

Milo's or Milo s may refer to:

- Milo's Astro Lanes, a 1998 bowling game for the Nintendo 64 home video game console
- Milo's Hamburgers, a regional restaurant chain based in Alabama, United States
- Milo's Tea Company, an Alabama-based tea and beverage company
- Southern Military District (Milo S), a former command of the Swedish Armed Forces

== See also ==
- Miloš (disambiguation)
- Milosz Point, South Shetland Islands, Antarctica
