= Owen Island =

Island of Antarctica

- Location within Antarctic Peninsula

Geography
- Location: Antarctica
- Coordinates: 61°56′S 58°26′W

Administration
- Administered under the Antarctic Treaty System

Demographics
- Population: Uninhabited

Owen Island in the Antarctic is a small (19 ha), circular, ice-free island lying between Round Point and Pottinger Point about 500 m off the north coast of King George Island, in the South Shetland Islands. It was charted and named in 1935 by DI personnel on the Discovery II.

== Important Bird Area ==
The island has been identified as an Important Bird Area (IBA) by BirdLife International because it supports a large breeding colony of about 21,000 pairs of chinstrap penguins in 1980, falling to 12,000 in 1987.

== See also ==
- List of Antarctic and Subantarctic islands
