= Mistake =

Mistake(s) may refer to:

- An error

== Law ==
- Mistake (contract law), an erroneous belief, at contracting, that certain facts are true
  - Mistake in English contract law, a specific type of mistake, pertaining to England
- Mistake (criminal law), or mistake of fact, a defense to criminal charges on the grounds of ignorance of a fact
- Mistake of law, a defense to criminal charges on the grounds of ignorance of law
- Error (law)

== Places ==
- Mistake Bay, a bay in Canada
- Mistake Crag, a crag in Antarctica
- Mistake Creek, Queensland, an Australian locality
- Mistake Peak, a mountain in Antarctica
- Mistake Peak (Arizona), a mountain in the U.S. state of Arizona
- Mistake River, a river in New Zealand

== Music ==
- Mistake (album), a 2002 album by D+
- "Mistake" (Mike Oldfield song), 1982
- "Mistake", by Shinhwa from Winter Story, 2003
- "Mistake", by Big Wreck from the album The Pleasure and the Greed, 2001
- "Mistake" (Stephanie McIntosh song), 2006
- "Mistake" (Moby song), 2009
- "Mistake", by Girls' Generation from the 2010 EP Hoot
- "Mistake", by Demi Lovato from her album Unbroken, 2011
- "Mistakes" (Madness song), 1979
- "Mistakes" (Don Williams song), 1982
- "Mistakes", by Godsmack from Awake, 2000
- "Mistakes", by Blue October UK from Preaching Lies to the Righteous, 2001
- "Mistakes", by Kutless from Hearts of the Innocent, 2006
- "Mistakes" (Brian McFadden song), a 2010 song featuring Delta Goodrem
- "Mistake", a 2016 single by Drug Restaurant
- "Mistakes" (Tove Styrke song), 2017

== Others ==
- Mistake (1953 film), an Iranian film
- Mistake (2013 film), an Indian Bengali-language drama film
- The Mistake (film), a 1913 American silent drama film
- Mistakes (film), a 2021 Czech film
- "The Mistake" (House), an episode of the TV series House

== See also ==
- A Mistake (disambiguation)
- The Mistake (disambiguation)
- Mistaken (disambiguation)
- Mistake Mistake Mistake Mistake, a 2006 album by James Figurine
- MST3K (Mystery Science Theater 3000), an American television comedy series
- Error (disambiguation)
