= Hole Rock =

Island in the South Shetland Islands

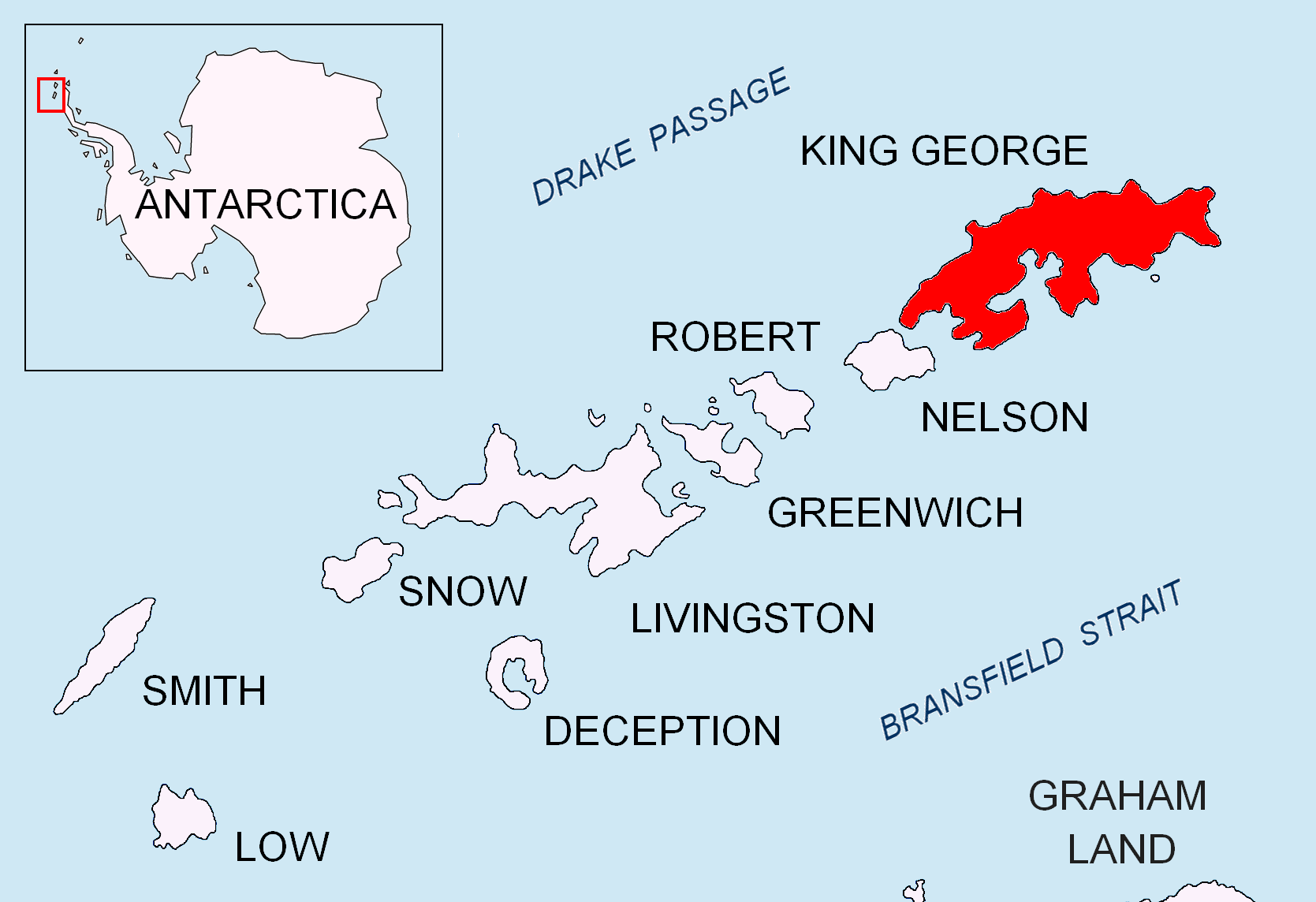
Location of King George Island in the South Shetland Islands.

Hole Rock (61°53′S 57°44′W) is the largest of several rocks lying close north of North Foreland, the northeast cape of King George Island, in the South Shetland Islands. It was charted in 1937 by Discovery Investigations personnel on the Discovery II and so named because a conspicuous hole extends through it.
