= Limit Rock =

Southern Ocean rock awash

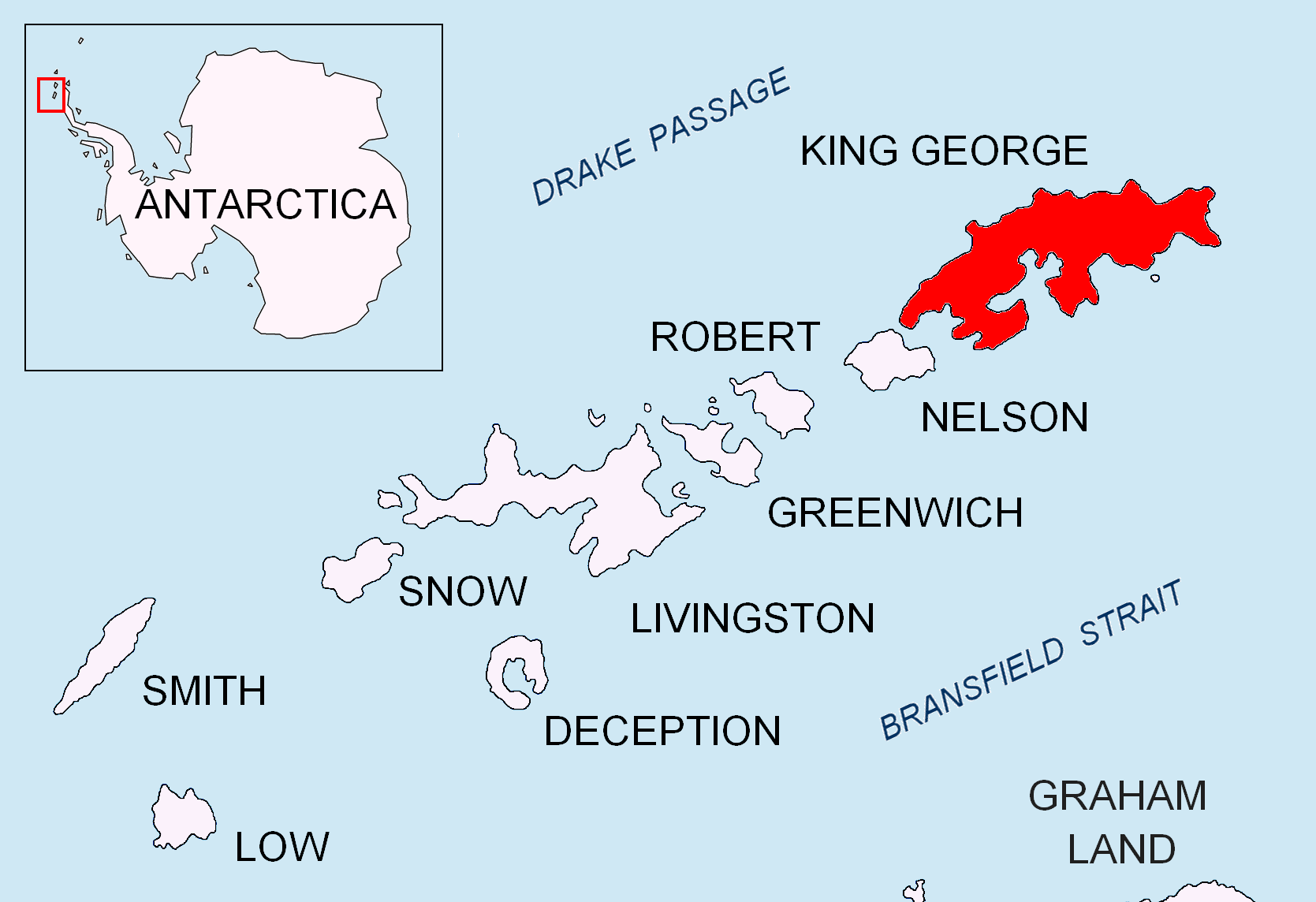
Location of King George Island in the South Shetland Islands.

Limit Rock (61°54′S 57°39′W) is a rock awash, lying 2 nautical miles (4 km) east of North Foreland, the northeast cape of King George Island, in the South Shetland Islands on the Southern Ocean. It was charted in 1937 by Discovery Investigations personnel on the Discovery II, and so named because it marks the eastern limit of foul ground surrounding North Foreland.
