= Shearer Stack =

Rock formation of the South Shetland Islands

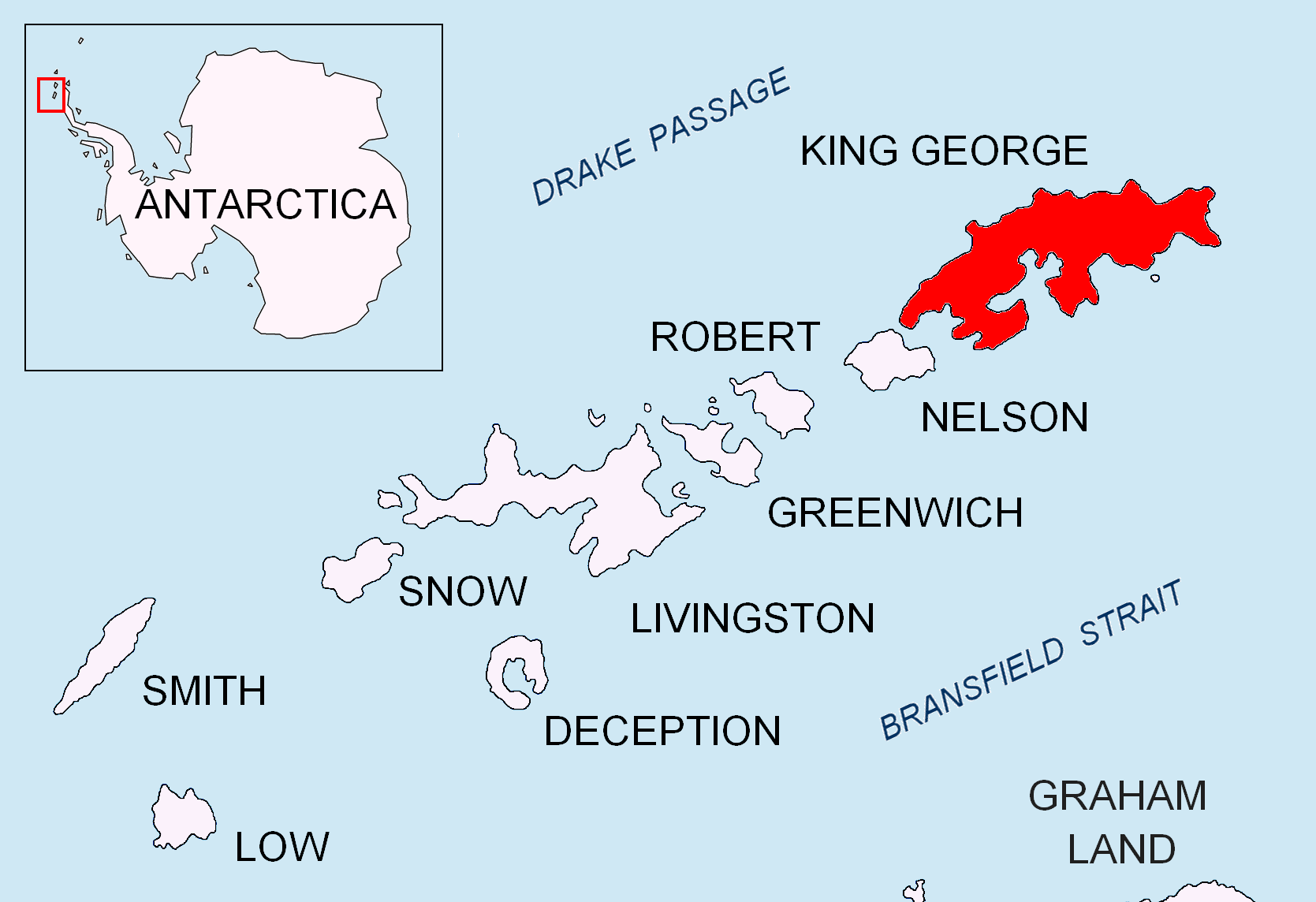
Location of King George Island in the South Shetland Islands.

Shearer Stack (61°55′S 58°5′W) is a rock stack lying 1.5 miles (2.4 km) southwest of False Round Point, off the north coast of King George Island in the South Shetland Islands. Named by the United Kingdom Antarctic Place-Names Committee (UK-APC) in 1960 for the American sealing vessel Charles Shearer from Nantucket, which visited the South Shetland Islands in 1874–75. In 1877 the ship again sailed for the islands and disappeared without a trace.
