= Jaegyu Knoll =

Undersea knoll

Jaegyu Knoll (63°28′00″S 56°27′00″W) is an undersea knoll (a submarine volcano) 5.5 nautical miles (10.2 km) northwest of Rosamel Island in the Antarctic Sound. It rises c. 700 metres (2,300 ft) above the sea floor to c. 200 metres (660 ft) below sea level. It was first mapped by swath bathymetry during a United States Antarctic Program cruise by Nathaniel B. Palmer, in January 2007 (Eugene Domack, chief scientist; M. Terminal, ship's master). Named by the US-Advisory Committee for Undersea Features in 2007 after Jeon Jaegyu, a young scientist at King Sejong Station on King George Island, with the Korean Antarctic Program during the 2003 field season. He participated in a rescue attempt for an overturned boat in Maxwell Bay but was himself thrown into the sea by heavy seas, and succumbed to hypothermia while making his way along the shore toward Marsh Station.
