= Hennequin =

Hennequin is a French surname. Notable people with the surname include:

- Alfred Hennequin (1842–1887), Belgian dramatist
- Benjamin Hennequin (born 1984), French weightlifter
- Daniel Hennequin (born 1961), French physicist
- Denis Hennequin (born 1958), French businessman
- Emile Hennequin (1859–1888), a French philosopher
- Philippe-Auguste Hennequin (1762–1833), French painter
- Victor Hennequin, French medium
- Paul Hennequin (born 2002), French cyclist

== See also ==
- Jean de Luxembourg (1400-1466), known as Hennequin
- Point Hennequin, headland of Antarctica
