= Pyrites Island =

Island in Antarctica

- Location within Antarctica

Geography
- Location: Antarctica
- Coordinates: 61°55′S 57°59′W

Administration
- Administered under the Antarctic Treaty System

Demographics
- Population: Uninhabited

Pyrites Island is the largest of three small islands lying northeast of Gam Point and forming the east side of Esther Harbor, off the north coast of King George Island in the South Shetland Islands. In 1913–14, the rocky extremity of Gam Point and the adjoining islands to the northwest and southeast were named Esther, Pyritis or Pyritic Islands by Scottish geologist David Ferguson, who reported they were composed of pyrites and vein quartz. From Ferguson's description it appears that the ice cliff behind the Gam Point has advanced since 1914 so that this "island" is now joined to the mainland. The highest and most conspicuous of the remaining islands is the one here described. The name Pyrites Island was recommended by the United Kingdom Antarctic Place-Names Committee (UK-APC) in 1960 to avoid confusion with the other existing "Esther" names in the vicinity.

== See also ==
- List of antarctic and sub-antarctic islands
