= Cove Rock =

Island in the South Shetland Islands

- Location within Antarctica Location within South Shetland Islands

Geography
- Location: Antarctica
- Coordinates: 61°54′S 57°48′W

Demographics
- Population: 0

Cove Rock is a low offshore rock 3 nautical miles (6 km) west of North Foreland, King George Island, in the South Shetland Islands. It was charted by Discovery Investigations in 1937 and called descriptively Cone Rock; the spelling Cove Rock, likely through error in transcription, appeared in a Hydrographic Office publication in 1942, and became established.
