= Wesele (disambiguation) =

Wesele may refer to:

- A title translated from Polish language as "Wedding reception"
  - The Wedding (1901 play)
  - The Wedding (1972 film)
  - The Wedding (2004 film)
  - The Wedding (2021 film)
- Jone Wesele, international rugby league footballer
- Wesele Cove, a cove on the south coast of King George Island, South Shetland Islands
