= Wawel (disambiguation) =

Wawel is a hill in Kraków, Poland, with an architectural complex built on top of it.

Wawel may also refer to:

== Specific buildings on the Wawel Hill in Kraków ==
- Wawel Castle
- Wawel Cathedral

== Other ==
- 1352 Wawel, an asteroid
- MS Wawel, a Polish ferry
- Wawel (company), a Polish confectionery brand
- Wawel Hill (Antarctica), a hill on King George Island off the coast of Antarctica
- Wawel Kraków, a Polish football club
- Wawel (train), an express train linking Poland with Germany
