= Ridley Island =

Island in Antarctica

- Location within Antarctica

Geography
- Location: Antarctica
- Coordinates: 61°51′S 58°3′W

Administration
- Administered under the Antarctic Treaty System

Demographics
- Population: Uninhabited

Ridley Island is an island lying 3.7 kilometres (2 nmi) north of False Round Point, King George Island, in the South Shetland Islands. This island was known to both American and British sealers as early as 1822, and the name Ridley is well established in international usage.

== See also ==
- List of Antarctic and sub-Antarctic islands
