= Bolinder Bluff =

Bolinder Bluff (61°56′S 57°58′W) is a prominent bluff crowned by three buttresses of dark grey and light brown rock, overlooking Venus Bay 3 nautical miles (6 km) southeast of False Round Point on the north coast of King George Island, in the South Shetland Islands. The feature was known to sealers using the anchorage at nearby Esther Harbor in the 1820s. It was charted and named by Discovery Investigations personnel on the Discovery II in 1937 when the breakdown of the Bolinder boat engine caused 6 men to be marooned for 9 days on the beach at the foot of the bluff.
