= Gam Point =

Headland on King George Island

Gam Point (61°55′S 58°0′W) is a rocky point on the north coast of King George Island, in the South Shetland Islands, about 2 nautical miles (4 km) southeast of False Round Point. The point is one of the features named Pyritic or Esther Islands by Scottish geologist David Ferguson in 1913–14. Although Ferguson represented the point as a rocky island separated from the ice cliff of King George Island by a channel 400 feet (120 m) wide, air photos show that there is no channel. It was named by the UK Antarctic Place-Names Committee in 1960. The word "gam" is an old sealers' and whalers' term for the occasions when groups of men from several vessels met in one of them for a gossip. Nearby Esther Harbour was an anchorage frequently used by sealers.
