= Tartar Island =

Island of Antarctica

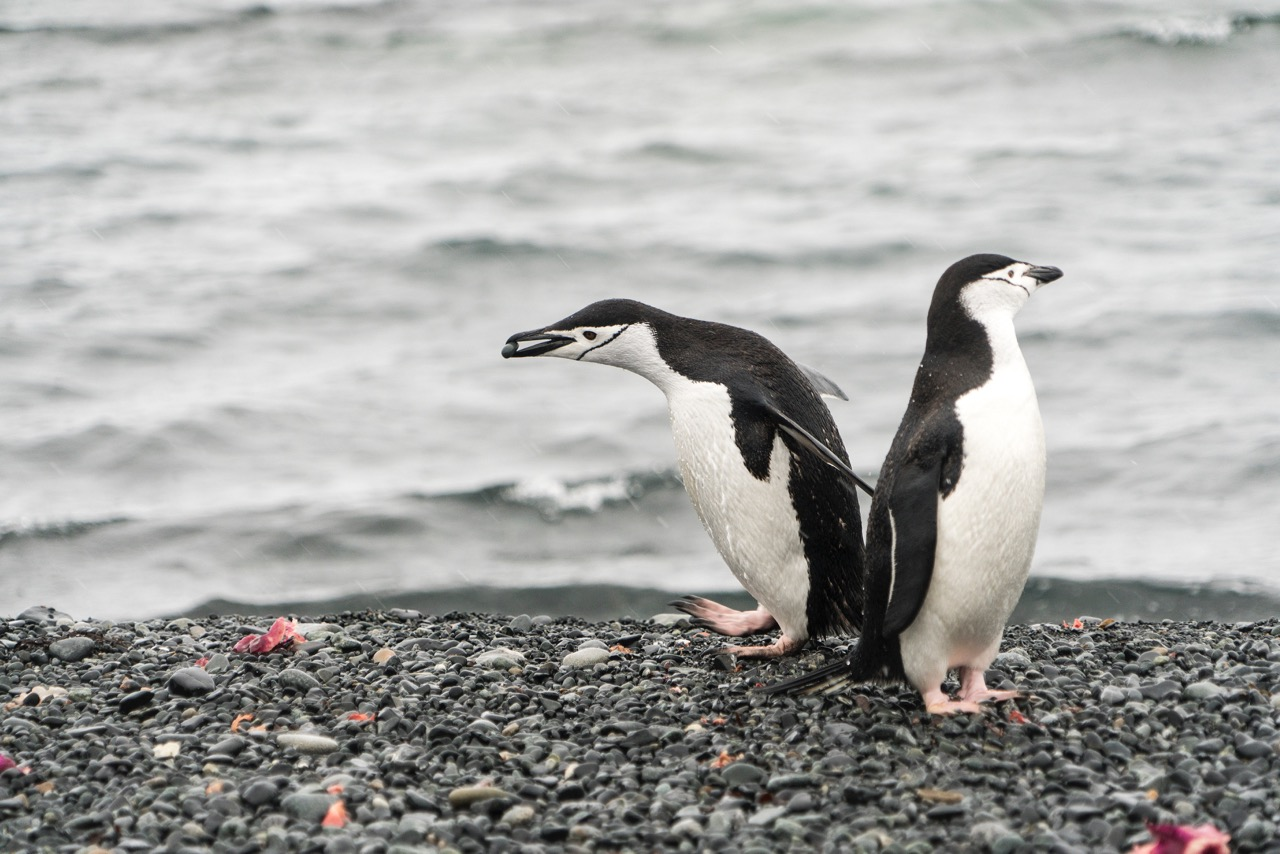
- Chinstrap penguins breed in the IBA

- Location within Antarctica Location within Antarctic Peninsula

Geography
- Location: Antarctica
- Coordinates: 61°55′47″S 58°26′13″W

Administration
- Administered under the Antarctic Treaty System

Demographics
- Population: Uninhabited

Tartar Island is a small (13 ha), ice-free, oval-shaped island 0.6 km (0.37 mi) long, lying 0.7 km (0.43 mi) north-west of Round Point, off the north coast of King George Island in the South Shetland Islands of Antarctica. It was named by the United Kingdom Antarctic Place-Names Committee (UK-APC) in 1960 for the sealing vessel Tartar (Captain Pottinger) from London, which visited the South Shetland Islands in 1821–22.

== Important Bird Area ==
The island has been designated an Important Bird Area (IBA) by BirdLife International because it supports a breeding colony of about 18,000 pairs of chinstrap penguins.

== See also ==
- List of Antarctic and subantarctic islands
