= Twin Pinnacles =

Rock in Antarctica

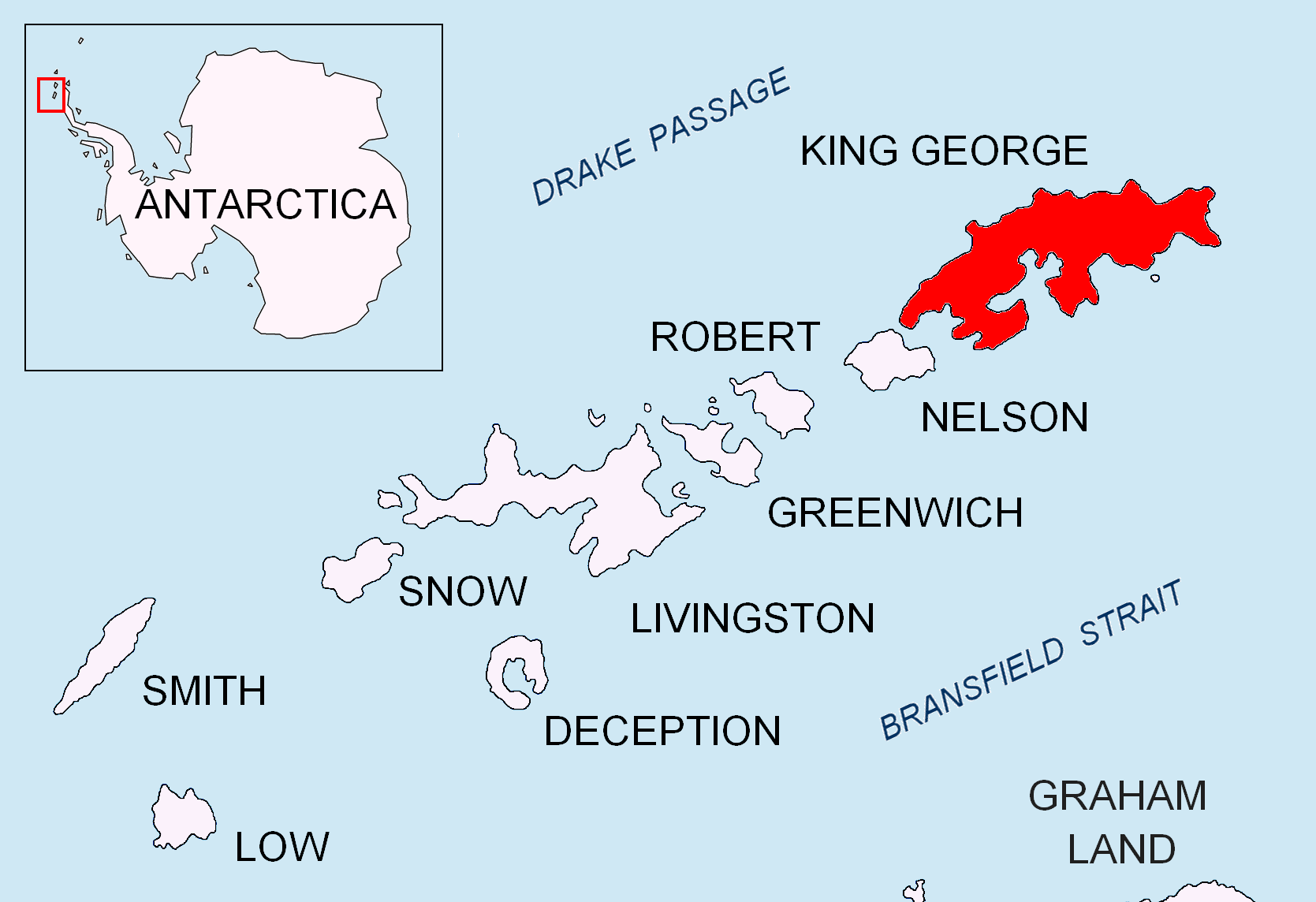
Location of King George Island in the South Shetland Islands.

Twin Pinnacles (62°8′S 58°6′W) is a rock 20 m (66 ft) high marked by two summits, lying 0.1 nautical miles (0.19 km; 0.12 mi) northeast of Lions Rump at the west side of the entrance to King George Bay in the South Shetland Islands. Charted and named during 1937 by DI personnel on the Discovery II.

== Sources ==
- Alberts, Fred G., ed. (1995), Geographic Names of the Antarctic (PDF) (2 ed.), United States Board on Geographic Names This article incorporates public domain material from websites or documents of the United States Board on Geographic Names.
