= Bolinder =

- J & C G Bolinders, Swedish industrial manufacturer of a castings and engines 1844-1932
- Bolinder-Munktell, Swedish manufacturer of a tractor and related machinery 1932-1979
- Bolinder Bluff, a landform of the South Shetland Islands
- Bolinder Stockholm, a luxury handbag brand from Sweden founded 2013

== People with the surname ==
- Anton Bolinder (1915–2006), Swedish high jumper
- Carl Gerhard Bolinder, (1818-1892) Cofounder of Bolinders Mekaniska Verkstad (1844) in Stockholm, Sweden
- Erik August Bolinder, (1863-1930) Director of Bolinders Mekaniska Verkstad at Kungsholmen and Kalhäll in Stockholm, Sweden between 1888-1930
- Jean Bolinder, (1813-1899), Cofounder of Bolinders Mekaniska Verkstad (1844) in Stockholm, Sweden
