= Emerald Cove =

- Location within South Shetland Islands
- Coordinates: 61°35′S 57°46′W
- Islands: South Shetland Islands
- Island: King George Island
- Body of water: Drake Passage

Emerald Cove is a cove 2 nautical miles (4 km) wide, lying between North Foreland and Brimstone Peak on the north coast of King George Island, in the South Shetland Islands. The name "Shireff's Cove" (with one 'r') was given by William Smith in 1819, after Captain William H. Shirreff of the Royal Navy, to whom he reported his discovery of the South Shetland Islands. In 1820, Smith's description of his landing on North Foreland was confused with his description of features on northern Livingston Island, and the name was applied to a feature on that island, where it has been officially accepted. The name "Emerald Cove" was applied by the UK Antarctic Place-Names Committee in 1960 and is for the brig Emerald (Captain John G. Scott) from Boston, MA, which visited the South Shetland Islands in 1820–21 in company with the Esther. These two vessels rescued the crew of the Venus from Esther Harbour in March 1821.
