= Chopin Ridge =

Ridge in the South Shetland Islands, Antarctica

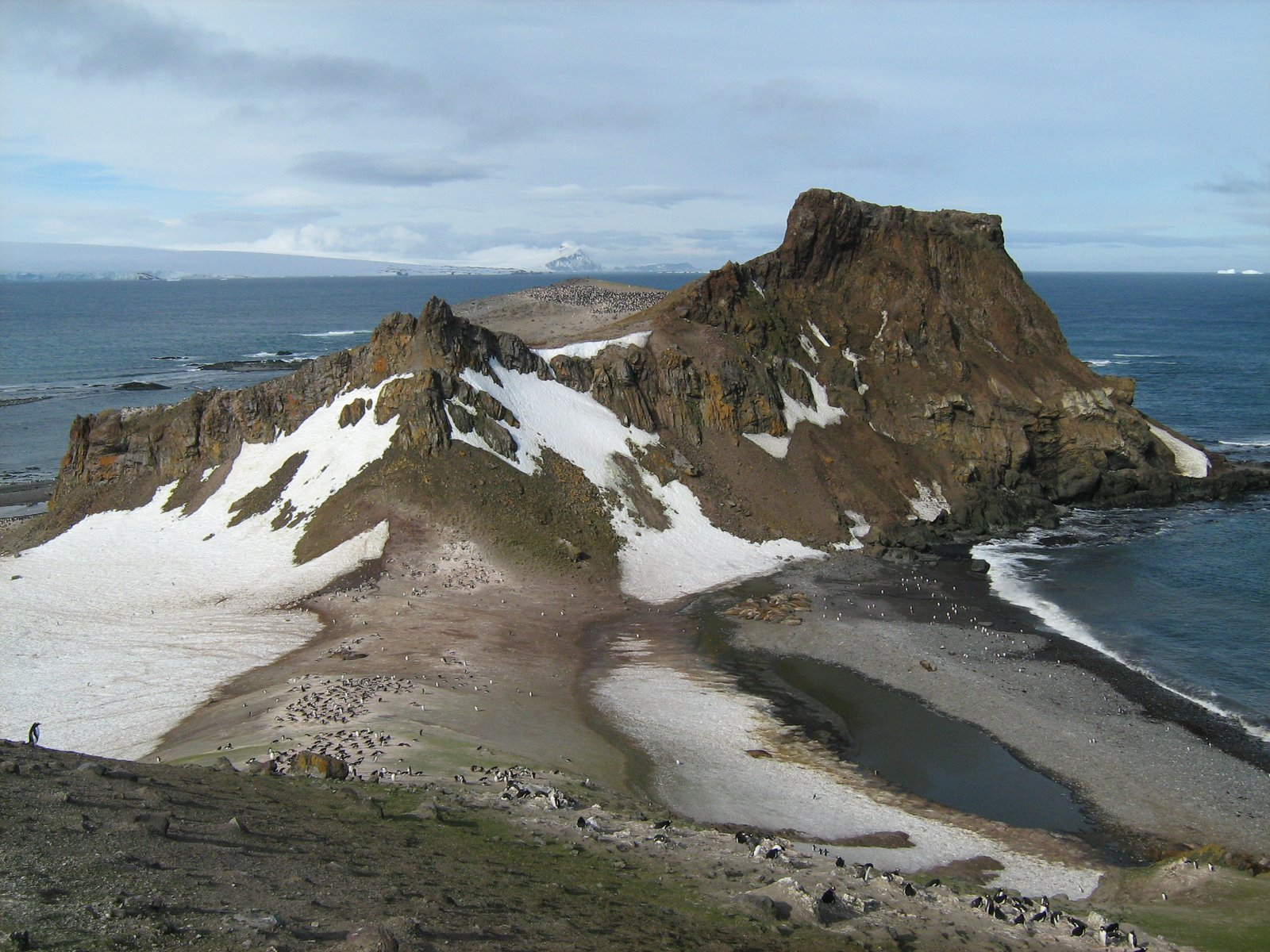

Chopin Ridge (62°9′S 58°8′W) is a ridge running north–south and rising to 265 metres (870 ft) between Lions Rump and Low Head, King George Island, South Shetland Islands. It was named by the Polish Antarctic Expedition to King George Island in the years 1977–1979 after Frédéric Chopin, the Polish composer.
