= Miloš (disambiguation) =

Miloš may refer to:

- Miloš (also Milos and Milosz), a masculine given name and a surname
- BOV M16 Miloš, a Serbian combat vehicle
- Miloš (unmanned ground vehicle), an unmanned ground vehicle developed by the Military Technical Institute Belgrade
- 3337 Miloš, an asteroid

== See also ==
- Milos (disambiguation)
- Milosz Point, South Shetland Islands, Antarctica
