= Stump Rock =

Offshore rock in Antarctica

Stump Rock (62°5′S 58°8′W) is an offshore rock in the west portion of King George Bay, 0.5 nautical miles (0.9 km) northwest of Martello Tower in the South Shetland Islands, which was charted and named in 1937 by Discovery Investigations personnel on the RRS Discovery II.
