= Pottinger Point =

Headland of Antarctica

Coordinates: 61°56′S 58°24′W

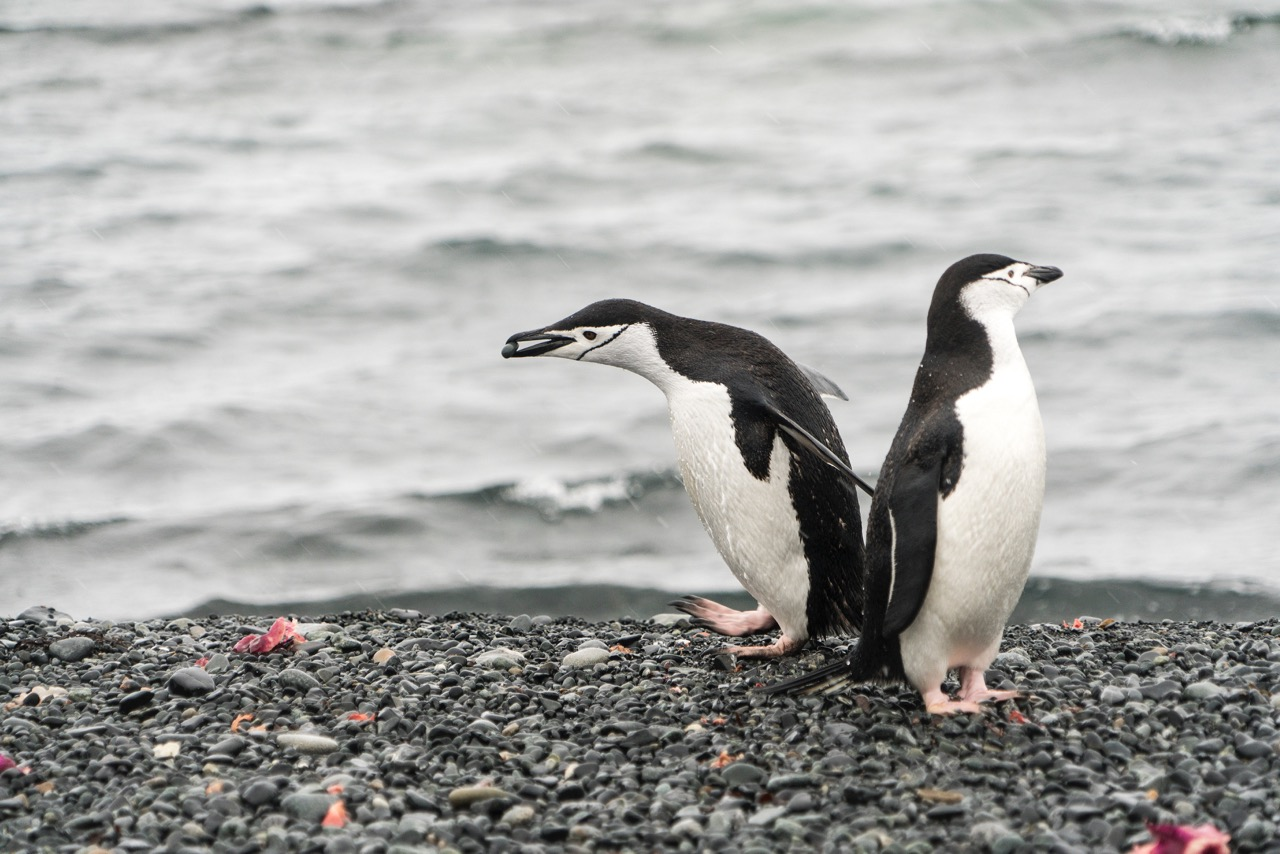
Chinstrap penguins breed in the IBA

Pottinger Point is a low-lying, ice-free promontory 4 km (2.5 mi) east of Round Point, about 500 m long, on the north coast of King George Island in the South Shetland Islands of Antarctica. It was named by the United Kingdom Antarctic Place-Names Committee (UK-APC) in 1960 for Captain Pottinger, Master of the Tartar from London, who visited the South Shetland Islands in 1821–22.

== Important Bird Area ==
The point has been identified as an Important Bird Area (IBA) by BirdLife International because it supports a breeding colony of over 55,000 pairs of chinstrap penguins, one of the largest in the South Shetlands.
