= Kellick Island =

Island of Antarctica

- Location within Antarctica Location within Antarctic Peninsula

Geography
- Location: Antarctica
- Coordinates: 61°55′S 58°26′W

Administration
- Administered under the Antarctic Treaty System

Demographics
- Population: Uninhabited

Kellick Island is an island 1 kilometre (0.5 nmi) long, lying 2 kilometres (1 nmi) north-east of Round Point, off the north coast of King George Island in the South Shetland Islands of Antarctica. It was named by the UK Antarctic Place-Names Committee in 1960 for Captain Kellick, Master of the British sealer Henry, who visited the South Shetland Islands in 1821–22.

== Important Bird Area ==
The island has been identified as an Important Bird Area (IBA) by BirdLife International because it supports a large breeding colony of about 27,000 pairs of chinstrap penguins.

== See also ==
- List of Antarctic and Subantarctic islands
