= Brimstone Peak (South Shetland Islands) =

Mountain in King George Island, South Shetland Islands, Antarctica

Brimstone Peak (61°55′S 57°45′W) is a conspicuous peak surmounting the rocky headland between Venus Bay and Emerald Bay, on the north coast of King George Island in the South Shetland Islands. The name North Foreland originally appeared for this feature on a chart by British sealer Captain George Powell in 1822, but this name has since become firmly established for the northeast cape of King George Island. The name Brimstone was applied in 1937 by DI personnel on the RSS Discovery II, because of its yellow brimstone color.
