= Cinder Spur =

Cinder Spur (62°9′S 58°11′W) is a small spur extending into Legru Bay, 1.5 nautical miles (3 km) west of Low Head on the south coast of King George Island, in the South Shetland Islands. It was so named by the UK Antarctic Place-Names Committee in 1963 because the feature is composed mainly of volcanic cinders.

Cinder Spur was later proven to be a cirque after snow retreat and is a dyke.

Extending north of the Spur is Mistake Crag.
