= Mistaken =

Mistaken may refer to:

- Mistaken (novel), a 2011 novel by Neil Jordan
- Mistaken Creek, a stream in Kentucky
- Mistaken Point, Newfoundland and Labrador, a small Canadian headland

== See also ==
- Mistaken Identity (disambiguation)
- Mistake (disambiguation)
- A Mistake (disambiguation)
- The Mistake (disambiguation)
