= Martello Tower (South Shetland Islands) =

Rock in the South Shetland Islands, Antarctica

Coordinates: 62°6′S 58°8′W

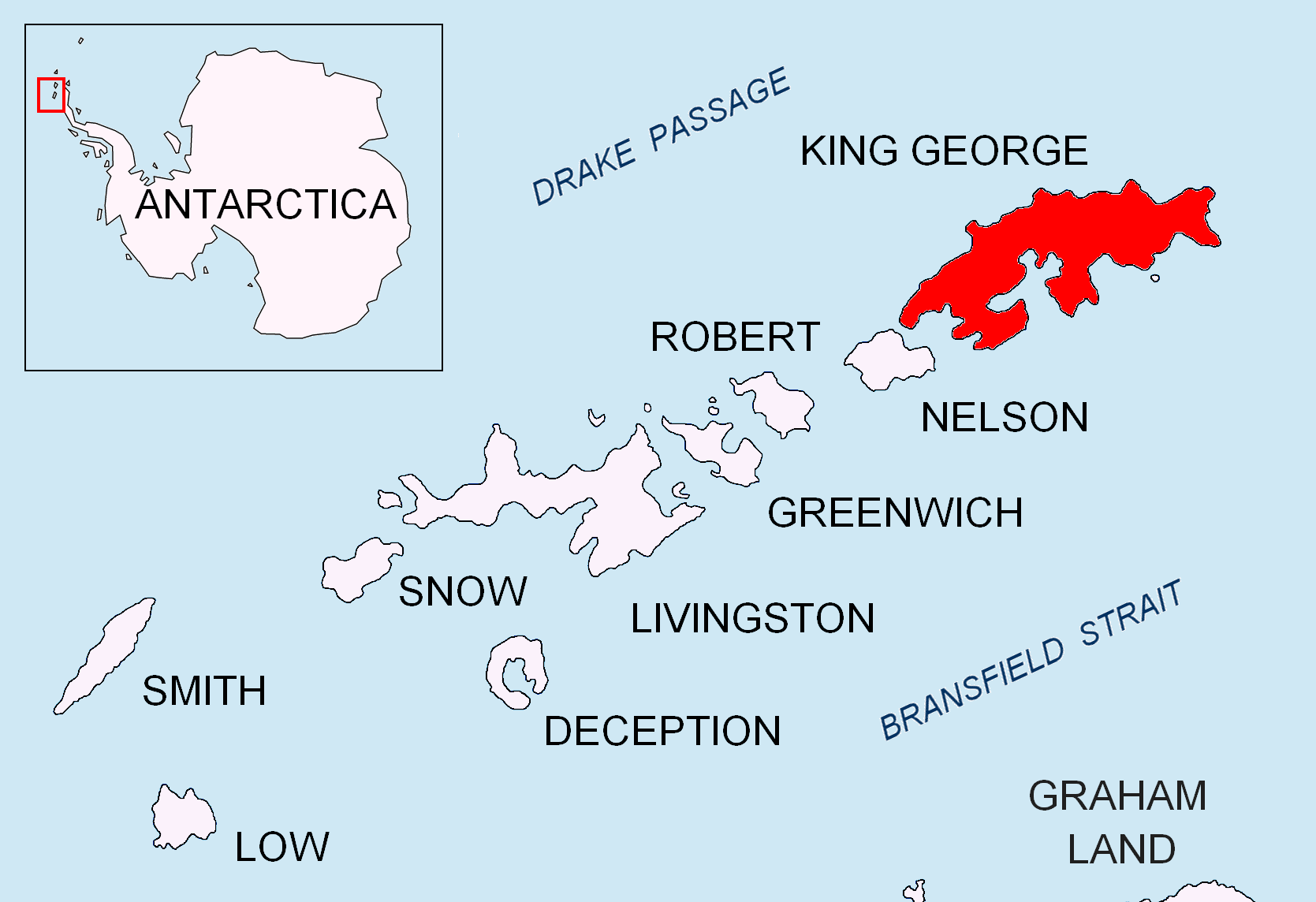
Location of King George Island in the South Shetland Islands.

Martello Tower is a rock 10 metres (33 ft) high, lying in King George Bay 2 nautical miles (4 km) north-north-west of Lions Rump, in the South Shetland Islands of Antarctica. It was charted in 1937 by Discovery Investigations personnel on the Discovery II, who named it after the fortified towers of that name.
