= Sherratt Bay =

Bay in the South Shetland Islands

Coordinates: 62°2′S 57°50′W

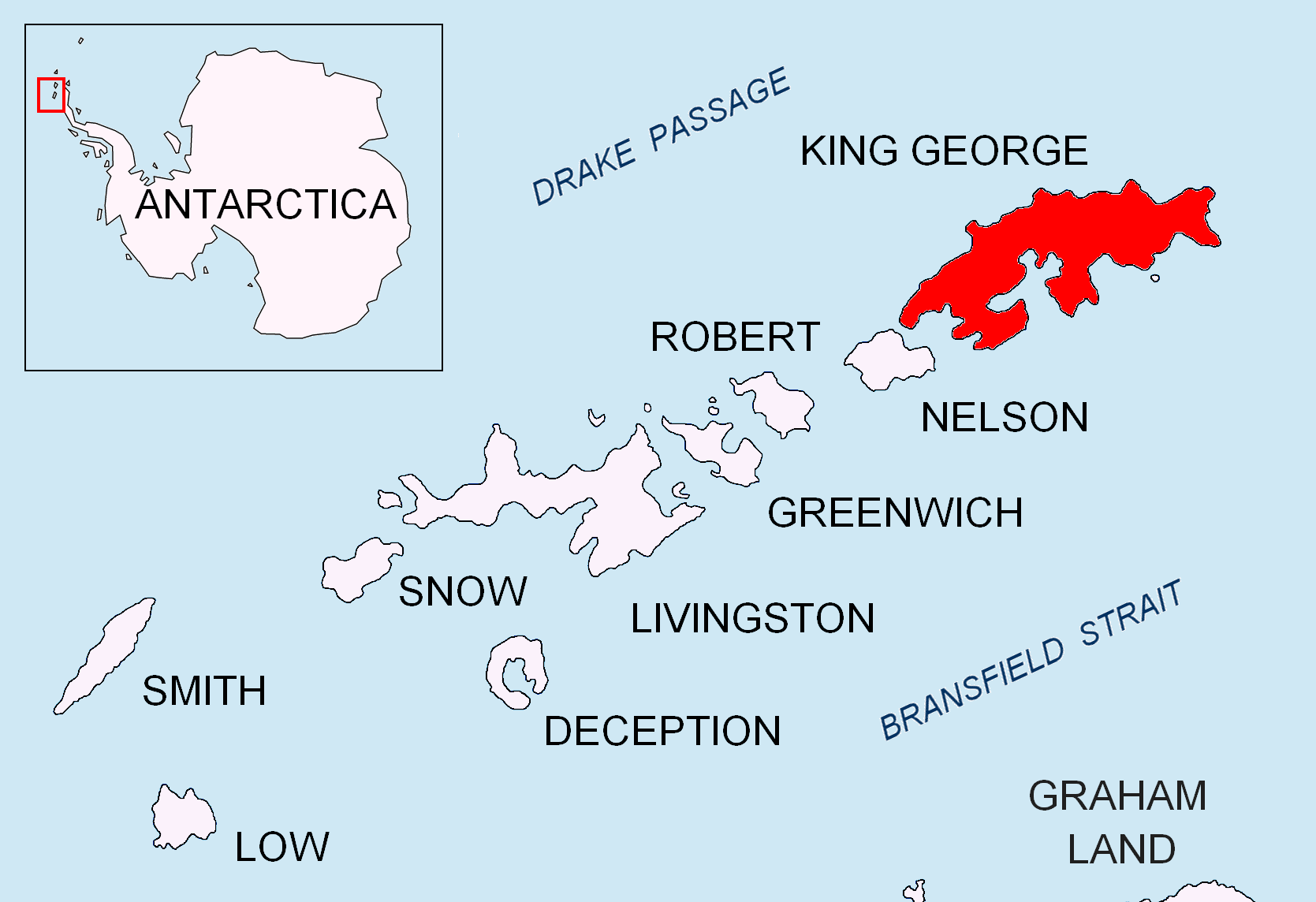
Location of King George Island in the South Shetland Islands.

Sherratt Bay is a bay between Cape Melville and Penguin Island on the south side of King George Island, in the South Shetland Islands of Antarctica. The existence of the bay was known and roughly charted by sealers working in the area in the early 1820s. It was named by the United Kingdom Antarctic Place-Names Committee (UK-APC) in 1960 for Richard Sherratt, Master of the Lady Trowbridge from Liverpool which was wrecked off Cape Melville on December 25, 1820. Sherratt occupied his time until rescued by making an inaccurate but historically interesting map of the South Shetland Islands.
