= The Mistake =

The Mistake may refer to:

- "The Mistake" (House), a 2005 episode of the television series House
- The Mistake (film), a 1913 silent film
- The Mistake, a play by Sir John Vanbrugh

== See also ==
- Mistake (disambiguation)
- Mistaken (disambiguation)
- The Mistakes, a 1690 English tragicomedy by Joseph Harris
