= Turret Point =

Turret Point (62°5′S 57°55′W) is a point marked by conspicuous high rock stacks, forming the east limit of King George Bay on the south coast of King George Island, in the South Shetland Islands. The point was charted in 1937 by Discovery Investigations personnel on the Discovery II who gave the name Turret Rocks, but this has led to confusion with a group of rocks lying close offshore. The United Kingdom Antarctic Place-Names Committee (UK-APC) recommended in 1960 that since the feature originally named is a land feature, the term point be used to avoid confusion and ambiguity.

Turret Point consists of shingles and cobbles, with finer grains of rock and biomass between the larger areas. Ponds occasionally form there. Lava flows in the area have given the point a step like appearance.
