= Pavel Prošek =

Czech geographer and climatologist (1940–2025)

Pavel Prošek (23 September 1940 – 2 November 2025) was a Czech physical geographer and climatologist.

== Life and career ==
Prošek was born in Zlín on 23 September 1940. He graduated from the Faculty of Science of Masaryk University in Brno.

He joined the Cartographic and Reproductive Institute in Prague, and after his compulsory military service in 1966, he began an internal postgraduate course in Brno in the field of climatology. In the early 1970s, he got a one-year internship at ETH Zurich. Between 1985 and 1990, he completed three expeditions to Svalbard. In the 1990s, as an associate professor and later a professor, he completed two expeditions in Antarctica, first on the Polish station, then on the Peruvian station. It was the limitations that resulted from the work on these stations that led Pavel Prošek and botanist Josef Elster to the initiative to build a Czech Antarctic station.

As part of the construction of the Antarctic station he visited Antarctica every year until the opening of the Mendel Polar Station on 22 February 2007, and several times thereafter. In addition, he represented the Czech Republic at international meetings of the Antarctic Treaty System, where he contributed to the fact that the Czech Republic received consultative status in 2014 and can thus co-decide on the current and future use of Antarctica.

In September 2020, he was awarded the Silver Medal of the President of the Senate of the Czech Republic. In June 2021, he received a commemorative plaque from the Czech Geographical Society for his outstanding contribution to Czech geography.

Prošek died on 2 November 2025, at the age of 85.
