= Milosz Point =

Headland of Antarctica

Coordinates: 61°55′00″S 57°45′30″W

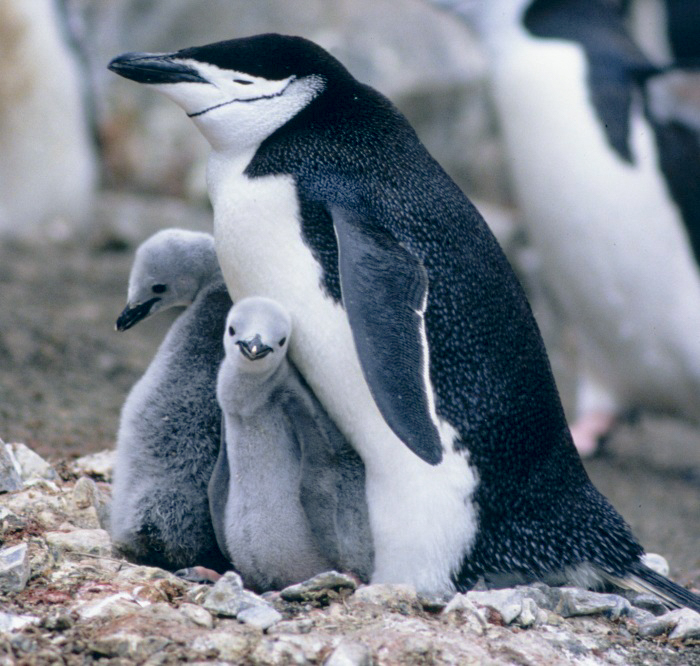
The IBA is an important breeding site for chinstrap penguins

Milosz Point is a low-lying, ice-free cape on the northern coast of King George Island, the largest of the South Shetland Islands of Antarctica. It lies 4.5 km west of North Foreland at the eastern entrance to Venus Bay and the western entrance to Emerald Cove. It, along with neighbouring Czeslaw Point, has been identified as an Important Bird Area (IBA) by BirdLife International because it supports a large breeding colony of about 17,000 pairs of chinstrap penguins.
