= Mersey Spit =

Spit on the South Shetland Islands

Mersey Spit (62°5′S 57°55′W) is a spit on the south coast of King George Island, close north of Penguin Island, in the South Shetland Islands of Antarctica. It was charted and named during 1937 by Discovery Investigations personnel on the Discovery II.
