= Warszawa Dome =

Warszawa Dome (62°12′S 58°35′W) is an ice dome rising to 450 m in southwest King George Island, bounded by Ezcurra Inlet, Admiralty Bay, Bransfield Strait and Maxwell Bay. Named by the Polish Antarctic Expedition, 1980, after Warsaw, capital of Poland.
