= Low Head (Antarctica) =

Coordinates: 62°9′S 58°8′W

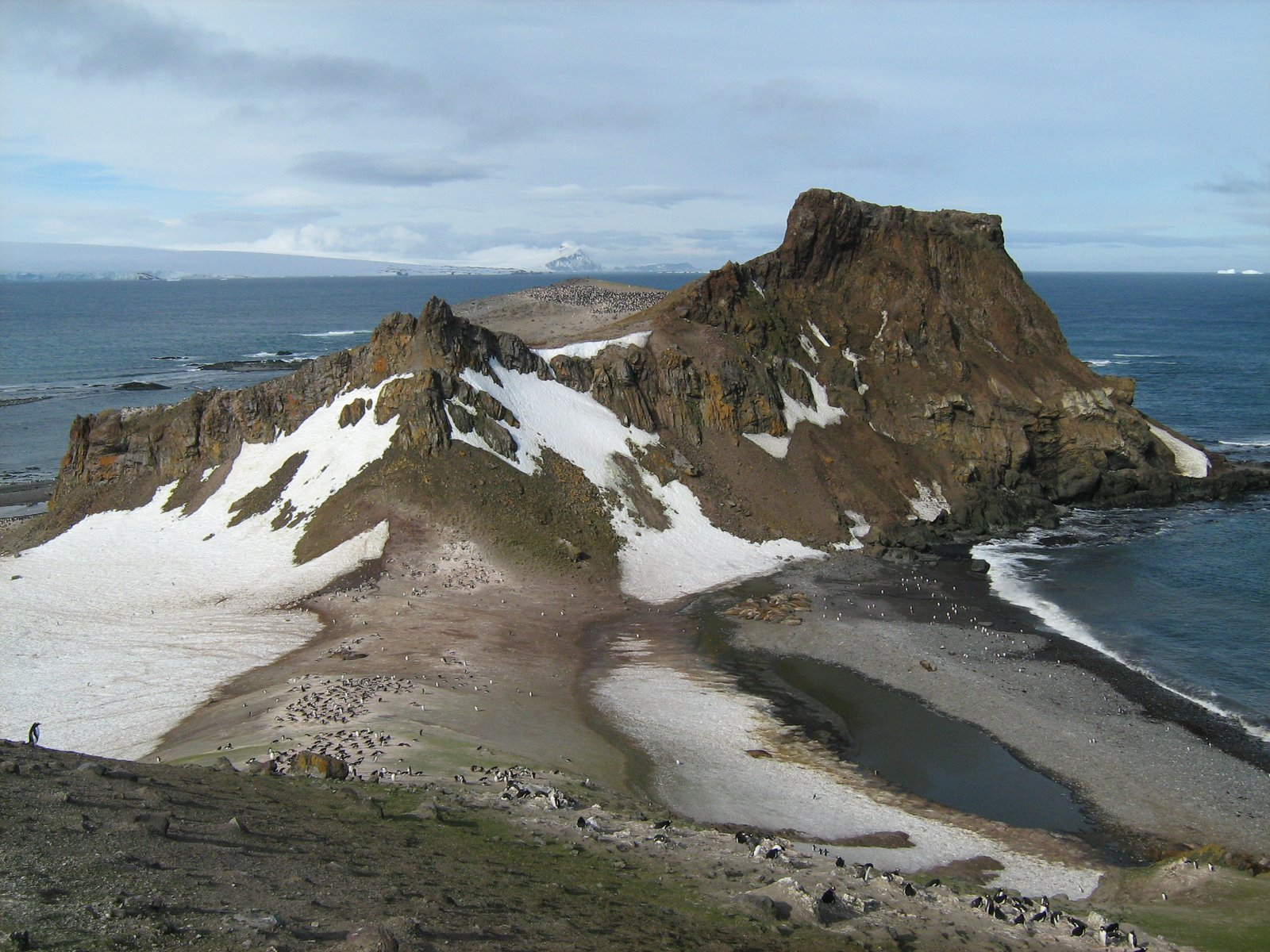
Low Head lies in the background on the right side of this image, nearby Lions Rump lies in the foreground of this image. Two rookeries of chinstrap penguins inhabit this area.

Low Head is a headland 1 nautical mile (2 km) south-southwest of Lions Rump, the west side of the entrance to King George Bay, on King George Island, in the South Shetland Islands, Antarctica. It was charted and given this descriptive name during 1937 by Discovery Investigations personnel on the Discovery II. Chopin Ridge runs between Lions Rump and Low Head.

On the north side of Low Head is Polonez Cove, named by the Polish Antarctic Expedition in 1980 from the Polish form of the French word polonaise, a stately Polish dance in 3/4 time.
