= Wawel Hill (Antarctica) =

Coordinates: 62°7′S 58°24′W

Wawel Hill is a hill rising to 290 m north of Point Hennequin, on the east side of Admiralty Bay, King George Island. Named "Góra Wawel" in 1980 by the Polish Antarctic Expedition after a hill by this name in Kraków, historic site of the castle of the Polish kings.
