= Cockscomb Hill =

Mountain in the Shetland Islands

Cockscomb Hill (62°5′S 58°30′W) is a conspicuous hill shaped like a cockscomb, 140 metres (460 ft) high, which rises through the glacier at the head of Mackellar Inlet in Admiralty Bay, King George Island, in the South Shetland Islands. It was first surveyed by the French Antarctic Expedition, 1908–10, under Jean-Baptiste Charcot, and named by Lieutenant Commander F.W. Hunt, Royal Navy, following his survey in 1951–52.
