= Daniel Hennequin =

French physicist

- Born: December 14, 1961; Lille, France
- Awards: 2013 Jean Perrin Prize of the French Optical Society
- Scientific career
- Fields: Physics
- Institutions: Lille University

Daniel Hennequin (born 14 December 1961) is a French physicist. His primary research areas include the dynamics of lasers and cold atoms. He is a former member of the board of the Société Française de Physique, and the winner of the 2013 Jean Perrin Prize of the French Optical Society.
