= Lions Rump =

Headland in Antarctica

Coordinates: 62°8′S 58°7′W

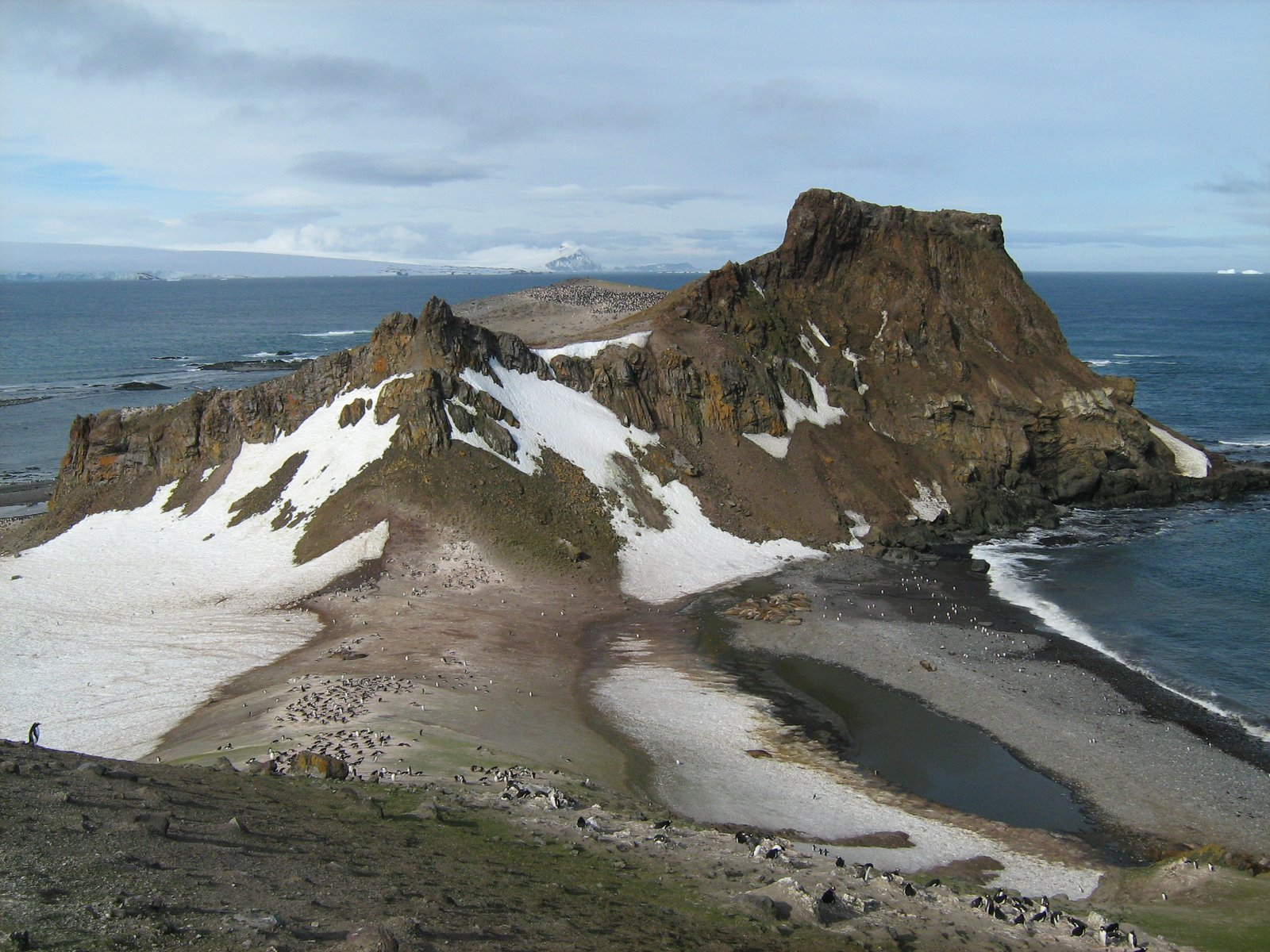
Lions Rump lies in the foreground of this image; nearby Low Head can be seen in the background on the right. Two rookeries of chinstrap penguins occupy the headland.

Lions Rump is a conspicuous headland 2 km (1.2 mi) north-northeast of Low Head, forming the west side of the entrance to King George Bay, on King George Island, in the South Shetland Islands of Antarctica. It was charted and given its descriptive name in 1937 by Discovery Investigations personnel on the Discovery II. Chopin Ridge runs between Lions Rump and Low Head. The rock feature known as "Martello Tower" lies 4 km (2.5 mi) to the north-northwest.

== Important Bird Area ==
The headland has been identified as an Important Bird Area (IBA) by BirdLife International because it supports a large breeding colony of Adélie penguins, with about 12,000 pairs recorded in 1980. Other birds nesting at the site in smaller numbers include gentoo and chinstrap penguins, southern giant petrels, Cape petrels, Wilson's and black-bellied storm petrels, snowy sheathbills, south polar and brown skuas, kelp gulls and Antarctic terns. Southern elephant seals, Antarctic fur seals and Weddell seals breed on the beaches. The boundary of the 149 ha (370-acre) IBA is defined by the boundary of ASPA 151, designated for the protection of the ecological values of the area, including the lichens, vascular plants and birds, and of representative examples of maritime Antarctic habitats.
