= Wesele Cove =

Wesele Cove (62°10′S 58°9′W) is a cove between Boy Point and Low Head on the south coast of King George Island, South Shetland Islands.

== History ==
Named in 1980 by the Polish Antarctic Expedition after Wesele (The Wedding), a play by Polish dramatist Stanislaw Wyspianski (1869–1907).
