= Milo's Tea Company =

American beverage company

- Trade name: Milo's Tea Co.
- Type: Private
- Industry: Beverage
- Founded: 1989
- Founder: Milo Carlton; Bea Carlton
- Headquarters: Bessemer, Alabama
- Key people: Tricia Wallwork (CEO)
- Revenue: ▲US$1 Billion (2026)
- Owner: Carlton family
- Number of employees: ~100 (2013)
- Website: drinkmilos.com

Milo's Tea Company is an American beverage company. It mainly sells its products, teas and lemonades, in grocery stores across the country. It was founded in 1989 as an offshoot of the Alabama-based restaurant chain Milo's Hamburgers. It is the fourth-largest iced tea maker in the country.

== History ==
Milo's Tea Company was sprouted from a burger restaurant called Milo's Hamburgers in Birmingham, Alabama. It was founded in 1946 by Milo Carlton and his wife, Bea, after Milo returned from his service in World War II. After nearly forty years of business, the couple's son, Ronnie Carlton, and his wife Sheila then realized that the teas were the most popular item on the menu. Starting in 1989, they then decided to sell it at grocery stores, calling it Milo's Famous Tea. The first store they sold it at was the chain Piggly Wiggly.

The parent company of the restaurant, Milo's Franchise Co., previously owned both Milo's Hamburgers and Milo's Tea Company, but the restaurant company was sold in 2002, forming Milo's Tea Co. In 2012, Milo's Franchise sued Milo's Tea, leading to a temporary pull of the brand of tea from the restaurant's stocks. The dispute was settled in 2013, with the tea continuing to be served at the restaurant.

In 2014, the product transformed from a regional brand to a national brand, over doubling the amount of states it was available in to 38. Lemonade, decaffeinated tea, and Arnold Palmers also debuted in that year. A new logo debuted in 2020.

== Products ==
The company is most known for its sweet tea, which has been made since 1946. It has only three ingredients (filtered water, pure cane sugar, and tea) and features no preservatives. Extra Sweet Tea is a variety of this that adds more sugar to the ingredients. The Zero Calorie version has no sugar or calories. The company also offers unsweetened tea, a drink equivalent to an Arnold Palmer, and lemonade. There are three drink sizes: 1 US gal (3.8 L), 0.5 US gal (1.9 L), and 20 US fl oz (590 mL).
