= Milo's Hamburgers =

Fast food chain in Alabama, US

- Type: Private
- Industry: Restaurants
- Genre: Fast food
- Founded: 1946; 80 years ago
- Founder: Milo Carlton (1919–1995)
- Headquarters: Vestavia Hills, Alabama
- Number of locations: 24 stores (2026)
- Key people: Tricia Wallwork (CEO)
- Products: Hamburgers, chicken fingers, French fries, grilled cheese sandwiches, sweet tea, soft drinks, milkshakes
- Revenue: ▲US$129 Million (2021)
- Owner: Carlton family
- Number of employees: 800 (2021)
- Website: miloshamburgers.com

Milo's Hamburgers, known colloquially simply as Milo's, is a regional fast food restaurant chain based in Alabama, United States, founded by Milo Carlton as Milo's Hamburger Shop in 1946. As of 2021, Milo's has 20 locations across Alabama. A signature menu item is a secret-recipe hamburger sauce, and Sweet Tea, which has been split off into the Milo's Tea Company. The chain's slogan is "Everybody goes to... Milo's"

== History ==
The restaurant was established by Milo Carlton, who, on April 16, 1946, opened Milo's Hamburger Shop in Birmingham, at 31st Street and 12th Avenue North. The restaurant moved to 2820 10th Avenue North in 1963. Milo's began selling franchises in 1983; the first franchise location, at 509 18th Street South in Birmingham, opened February 7, 1983. Since the 1980s, they also distribute their own tea brand in Alabama, Arkansas, Colorado, Georgia, Louisiana, Maryland, Mississippi, Missouri, Tennessee, Texas, as well as parts of the Florida panhandle, Hawaii, Illinois, Indiana, Kentucky, Missouri, Ohio, Oklahoma, South Carolina, Virginia, Washington, West Virginia, and Wisconsin. The tea company split off in 2002.

One location in Tuscaloosa was destroyed in the EF4 tornado on April 27, 2011, and a new Milo's was recently constructed in a new location.

== See also ==
- Jack's (another original hamburger fast food restaurant, based in Alabama)
- List of hamburger restaurants
