= Point Hennequin =

Headland of Antarctica

Coordinates: 62°8′S 58°24′W

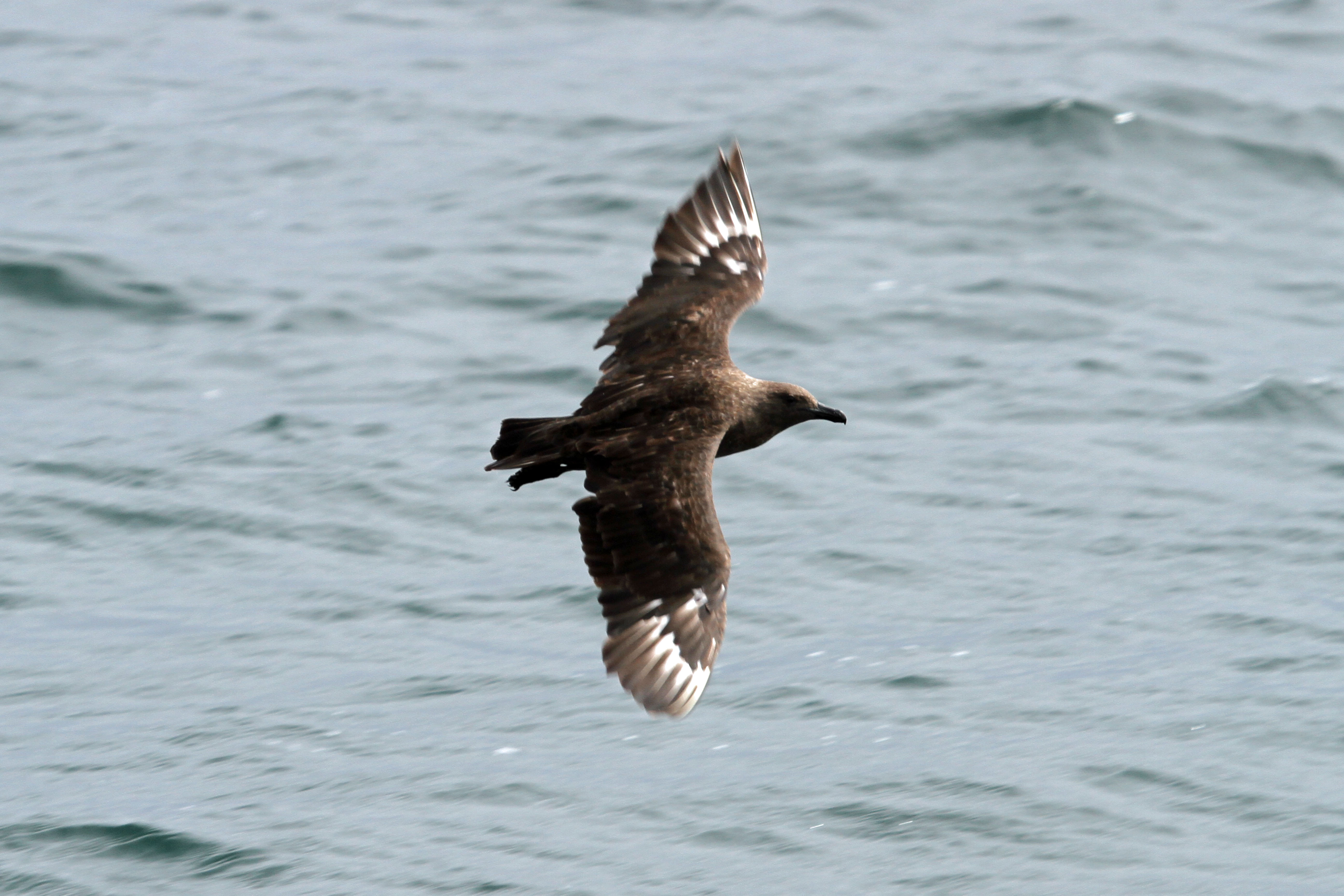
South polar skuas breed at the point

Point Hennequin is a point forming the eastern side of the entrance to Martel Inlet and Mackellar Inlet, on the east side of Admiralty Bay, King George Island, in the South Shetland Islands. It was named by the French Antarctic Expedition under Jean-Baptiste Charcot, who surveyed Admiralty Bay in 1909.

== Important Bird Area ==
A 277 ha site comprising all the ice-free ground at the point has been designated an Important Bird Area (IBA) by BirdLife International because it supports a colony of about 100 south polar skuas. Other birds reported as breeding on the site include black-bellied storm petrels, Wilson's storm petrels, Cape petrels, Chilean skuas, brown skuas, kelp gulls and Antarctic terns.
