= Maxwell Bay (Antarctica) =

Bay in Antarctica

Coordinates: 62°15′S 58°51′W

Maxwell Bay, also called Fildes Bay (in Chile) and Guardia Nacional Bay (in Argentina) is a bay 19 km (12 mi) long, lying between King George Island and Nelson Island, in the South Shetland Islands of Antarctica. The main entrance to the bay is at the south-east side and is wide open; Fildes Strait on the north-west side is encumbered by rocks and is only navigable by boats. The name "Maxwells Straits" was given to this bay and to Fildes Strait by British sealing captain James Weddell in 1822–24, for Lieutenant Francis Maxwell who had served with Weddell in 1813–14. The name was altered and limited to the feature here described by the UK Antarctic Place-Names Committee in 1960.

== Historic site ==
A brass plaque bearing the Polish Eagle, the dates 1975 and 1976, and an inscription in Polish, English and Russian, is mounted on a cliff on King George Island facing the bay. The text of the inscription reads:

In memory of the landing of members of the first Polish Antarctic marine research expedition on the vessels Profesor Siedlecki and Tazar in February 1976.

It has been designated a Historic Site or Monument (HSM 50), following a proposal by Poland to the Antarctic Treaty Consultative Meeting.
