= Esther Harbour =

- Location within South Shetland Islands
- Coordinates: 61°55′S 57°59′W
- Islands: South Shetland Islands
- Island: Pyrites Island

Esther Harbour () is a small harbour at the west side of Venus Bay, lying immediately west of Pyrites Island and south of Gam Point, on the north coast of King George Island in the South Shetland Islands. The harbour was known to both American and British sealers as early as 1821. The sealing vessel Esther (Captain Low) of Boston worked in this area in the 1820–21 season.
