= Mistake Crag =

Mistake Crag (62°9′S 58°11′W) is a slightly bowed crag in Antarctica, extending north from Cinder Spur and rising to about 90 metres (300 ft) above the presently unnamed glacier on its west side. The name is derived from the mistaken belief that Cinder Spur was mainly composed of cinders from the supposed adjacent volcanic vent, now proved by snow retreat to be a cirque. The crag is really formed of sedimentary rock, whereas Cinder Spur is a dyke.
