= A Mistake =

A Mistake may refer to:

- A Mistake (film), a 2024 New Zealand film starring Elizabeth Banks
- "A Mistake", a 1999 Fiona Apple song from the album When the Pawn...
- Ek Bhram...Sarvagun Sampanna (lit. 'A Mistake...Full of Virtues'), a 2019 Indian television series

== See also ==
- Mistake (disambiguation)
