= Round Point =

Point on King George Island, South Shetland Islands

Coordinates: 61°56′S 58°28′W

Round Point is a point 22 km (14 mi) west of False Round Point on the north coast of King George Island, in the South Shetland Islands of Antarctica. Kellick Island lies 2 km to the north-east and Tartar Island 1 km to the north-west. The descriptive name dates back to at least 1822 and is established in international usage.
