= Mistake (1953 film) =

- Directed by: Mansour Mobini
- Written by: Mansour Mobini
- Release date: 10 April 1953
- Running time: 110 minutes
- Country: Iran
- Language: Persian

Mistake (Persian: Eshtebah) is a 1953 Iranian film directed by Mansour Mobini.

== Bibliography ==
- Mohammad Ali Issari. Cinema in Iran, 1900-1979. Scarecrow Press, 1989.
