= False Round Point =

Headland of Antarctica

Coordinates: 61°54′S 58°2′W

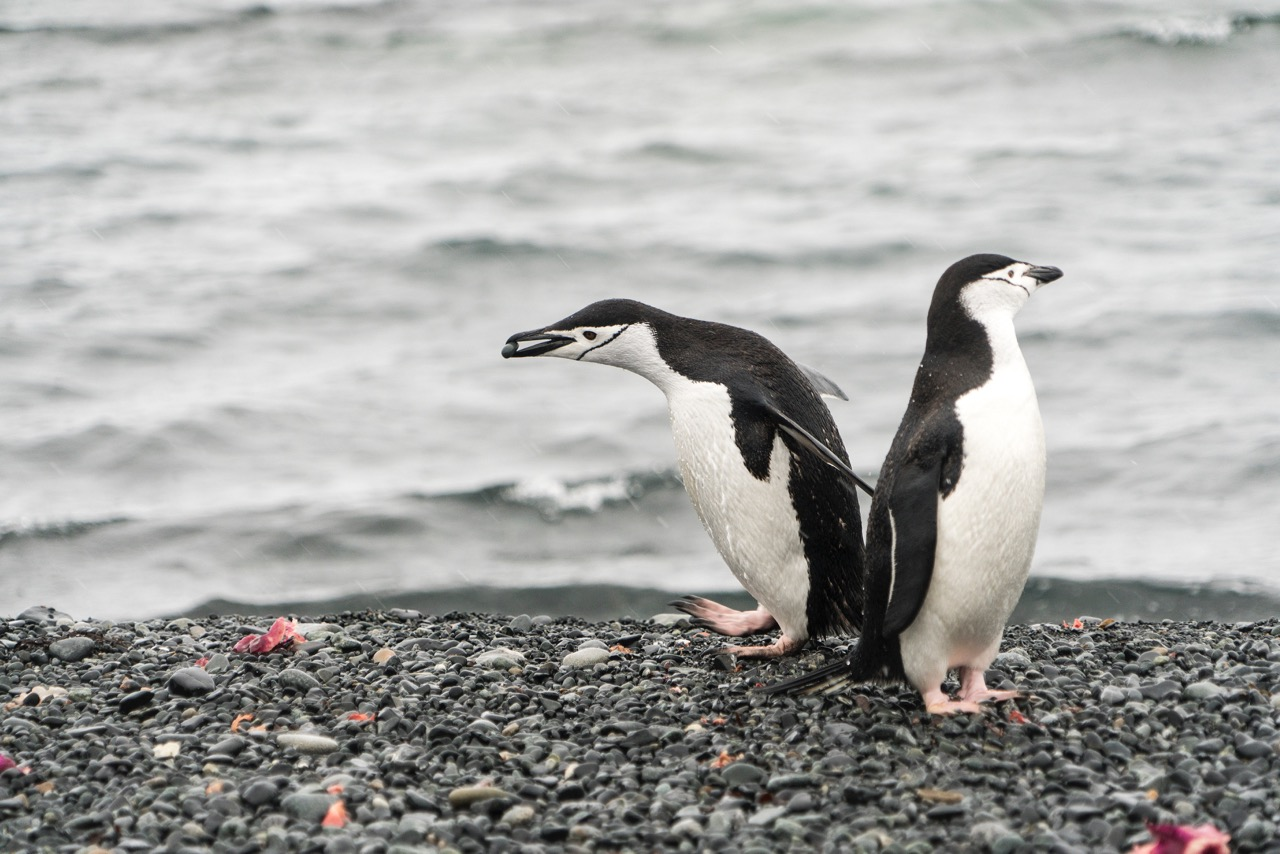
Chinstrap penguins breed in the IBA

False Round Point is a point 16 km (9.9 mi) west of North Foreland and 4 km (2.5 mi) south of Ridley Island, on the north coast of King George Island in the South Shetland Islands of Antarctica. The point has appeared on charts since about 1822. It was probably named for its similarity to Round Point, which lies 22 km (14 mi) to the west, by Discovery Investigations personnel on the Discovery II who charted the north coast of this island in 1937.

== Important Bird Area ==
A 125 ha tract of ice-free land, including the headland, has been identified as an Important Bird Area (IBA) by BirdLife International because it supports a large breeding colony of about 50,000 pairs of chinstrap penguins.
