= North Foreland (South Shetland Islands) =

Headland on King George Island, Antarctica

Coordinates: 61°53′35″S 57°41′17″W

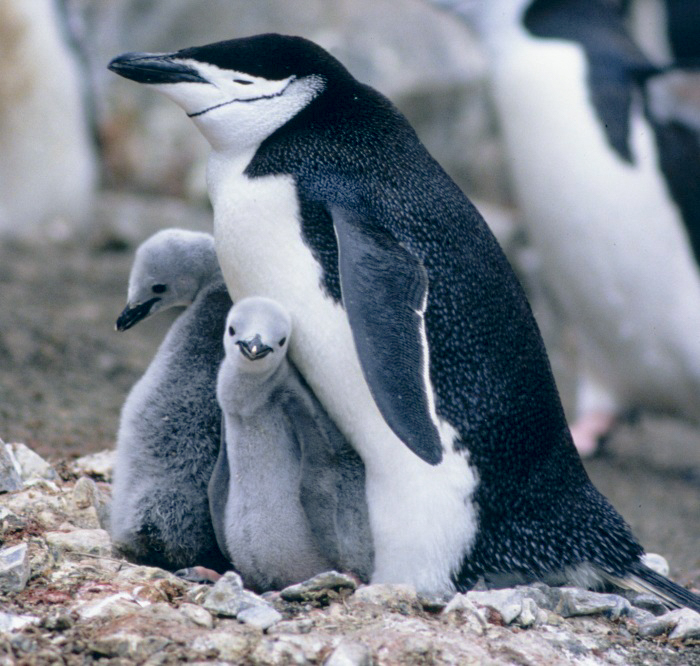
The IBA is an important breeding site for chinstrap penguins

North Foreland is an ice-free headland on the northern coast of King George Island, the largest of the South Shetland Islands of Antarctica. It lies at the eastern entrance to Emerald Cove, 4.5 km east of Milosz Point, extending northwards for about 2 km and forming the northernmost extremity of the Island.

== Important Bird Area ==
The headland has been identified as an Important Bird Area (IBA) by BirdLife International because it supports a large breeding colony of about 23,000 pairs of chinstrap penguins. southern giant petrels also nest at the site, with 248 pairs recorded in 1966.
