= King George Bay (Antarctica) =

Bay in the South Shetland Islands of Antarctica

King George Bay (62°6′S 58°5′W) is a bay indenting the south coast of King George Island for 6 nautical miles (11 km) between Lions Rump and Turret Point, in the South Shetland Islands. It was named on 24 January 1820 after the then-reigning sovereign of the United Kingdom, King George, by a British expedition under Edward Bransfield.
