= King George Island (South Shetland Islands) =

Island of the South Shetland Islands

- Map of King George Island

- Location within South Shetland Islands Location within Antarctica

Geography
- Location: Antarctica
- Coordinates: 62°02′S 58°21′W
- Archipelago: South Shetland Islands
- Area: 1,150 km^{2} (440 sq mi)
- Length: 95 km (59 mi)
- Width: 25 km (15.5 mi)

Administration
- Administered under the Antarctic Treaty System

Demographics
- Population: around 500

King George Island (Argentinian Spanish: Isla 25 de Mayo, Brazilian Portuguese: Ilha do Rei George, Chilean Spanish: Isla Rey Jorge, Russian: Ватерло́о Vaterloo) is the largest of the South Shetland Islands, lying 120 km (75 miles) off the coast of Antarctica in the Southern Ocean. The island was named after King George III.

== Geography ==
King George Island has three major bays, Maxwell Bay, Admiralty Bay, and King George Bay. Admiralty Bay contains three fjords, and is protected as an Antarctic Specially Managed Area under the Protocol on Environmental Protection to the Antarctic Treaty.

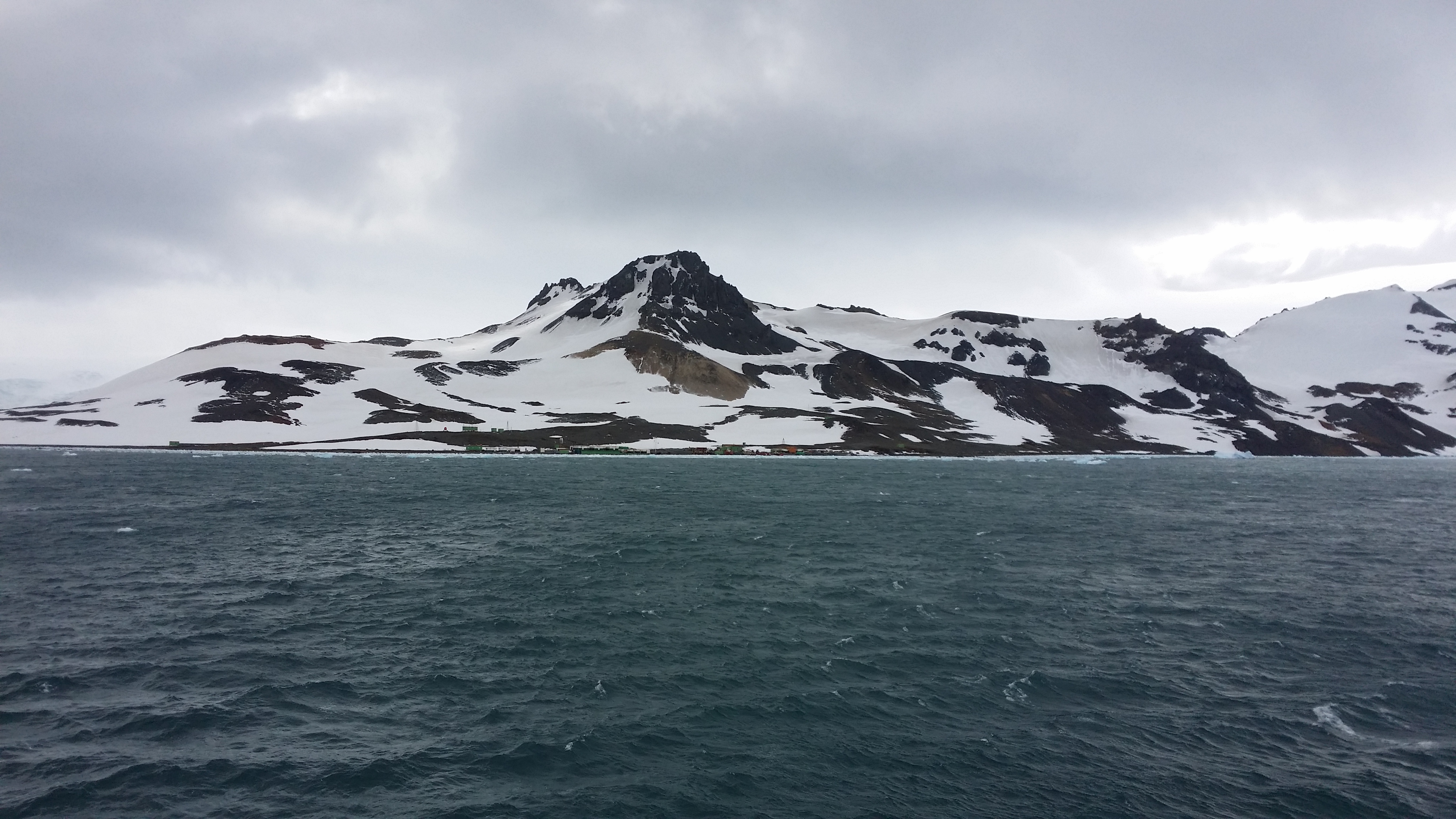
Admiralty Bay

The Fildes Peninsula, 7 kilometres (4.3 mi) long, forms the southwest extremity of the island. It was named from association with nearby Fildes Strait by the UK-APC in 1960.

== History ==
Chilean scientist Victor Ariel Gallardo had claimed in 1972 that Amerindians visited the area, citing stone artefacts recovered from bottom-sampling operations in Admiralty Bay; however, the artefacts—two arrowheads—were later found to have been planted.

The island was first claimed for Britain on 16 October 1819, formally annexed by Britain as part of the Falkland Islands Dependencies in 1908, and now as part of the separate British Antarctic Territory. The island was claimed by Chile in 1940 as part of the Chilean Antarctic Territory. It was also claimed by Argentina in 1943, and now as part of Argentine Antarctica, called by the Argentines Isla Veinticinco de Mayo (25 May) in honour of their National Day. The United States and Russia do not recognise any Antarctic claim, but have reserved their right to lodge a claim of their own.

The island was discovered and named by the British explorer William Smith in 1819 after King George III. It is approximately 95 km (59 mi) long and 25 km (16 mi) wide with a land area of 1,150 square kilometres (444 sq mi). Over 90% of the island's surface is permanently glaciated. In 1821, 11 men of the sealing vessel Lord Melville survived the winter on the island, the first men to do so in Antarctica.

== Ecology ==
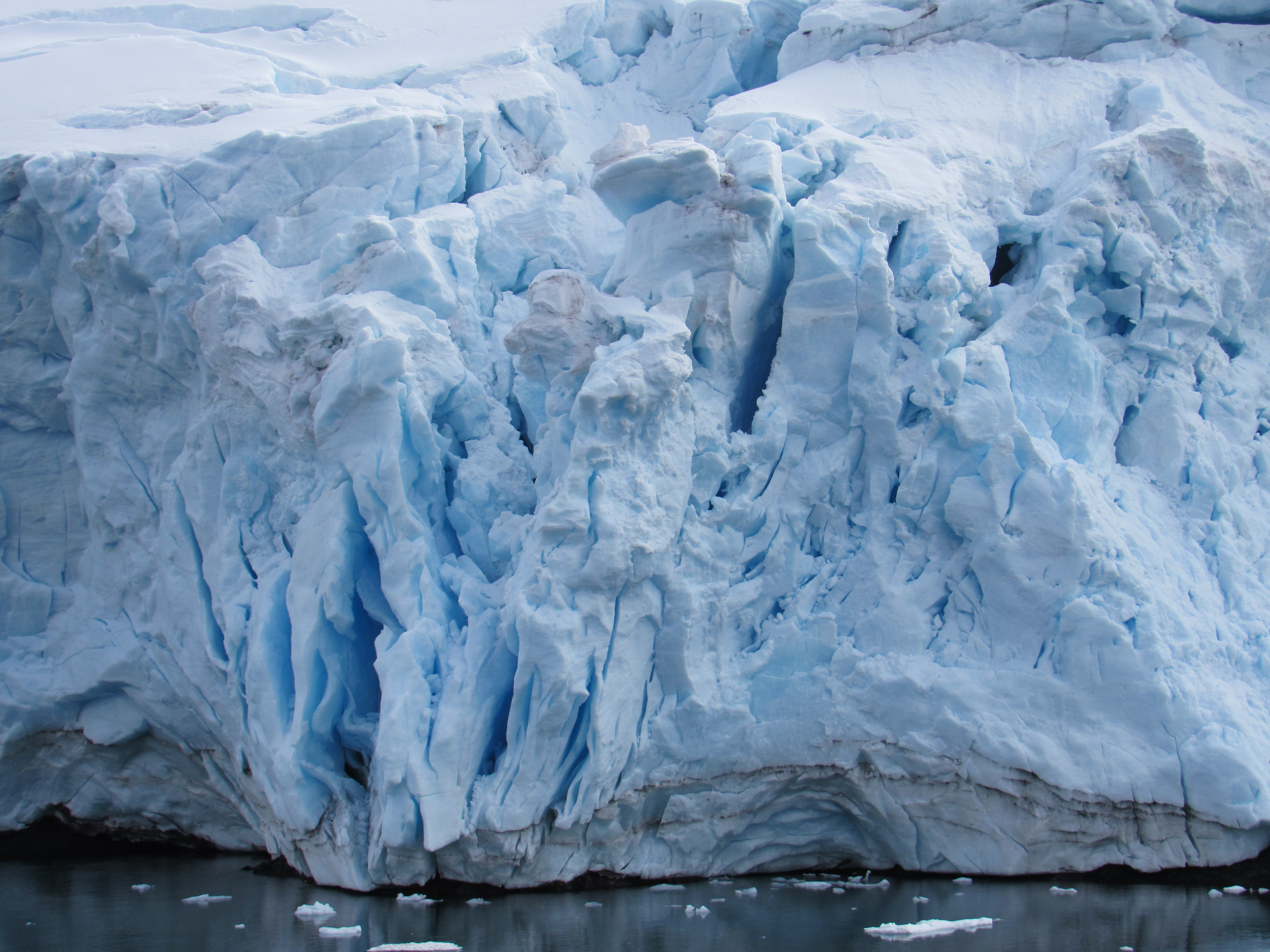
Collins Glacier, King George Island

The coastal areas of the island are home to a comparatively diverse selection of animal life, including elephant, Weddell, and leopard seals, and Adelie, chinstrap and gentoo penguins. Several other seabirds, including skuas and southern giant petrel, nest on this island during the summer months.

In 1971, Denis C. Lindsay published Vegetation of the South Shetland Islands, and in doing so was the first professional botanist to outline the flora of King George Island. Only two vascular plants are known to grow on the island - Antarctic hair grass and Antarctic pearlwort. The flora is otherwise dominated by lichens and mosses. Ryszard Ochyra reports in his 1998 publication that there are 61 distinct species of moss found on the island, which is considered rich for the latitude. This makes King George Island "one of the most muscologically diverse areas in the Antarctic".

== Human activity ==
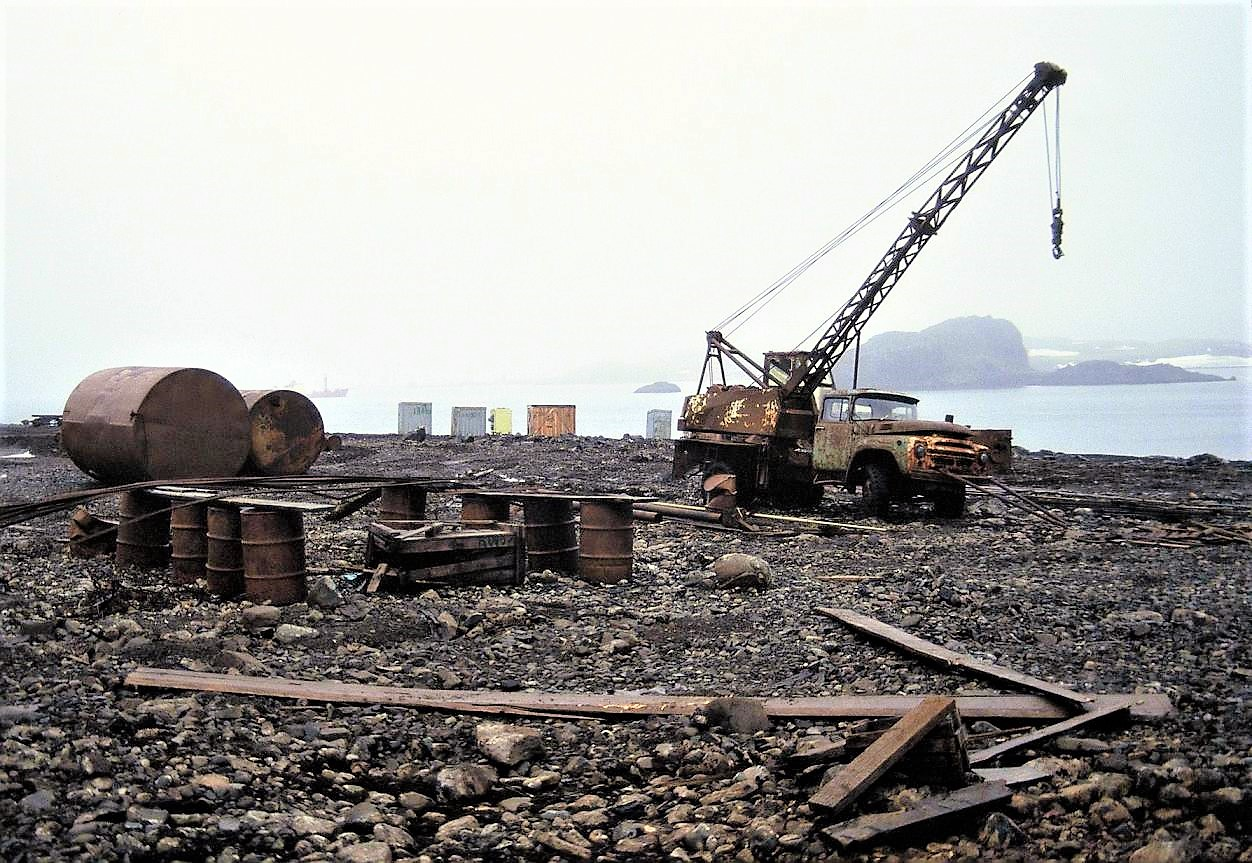
Junk on the shoreline at Bellingshausen Station

=== Settlements ===
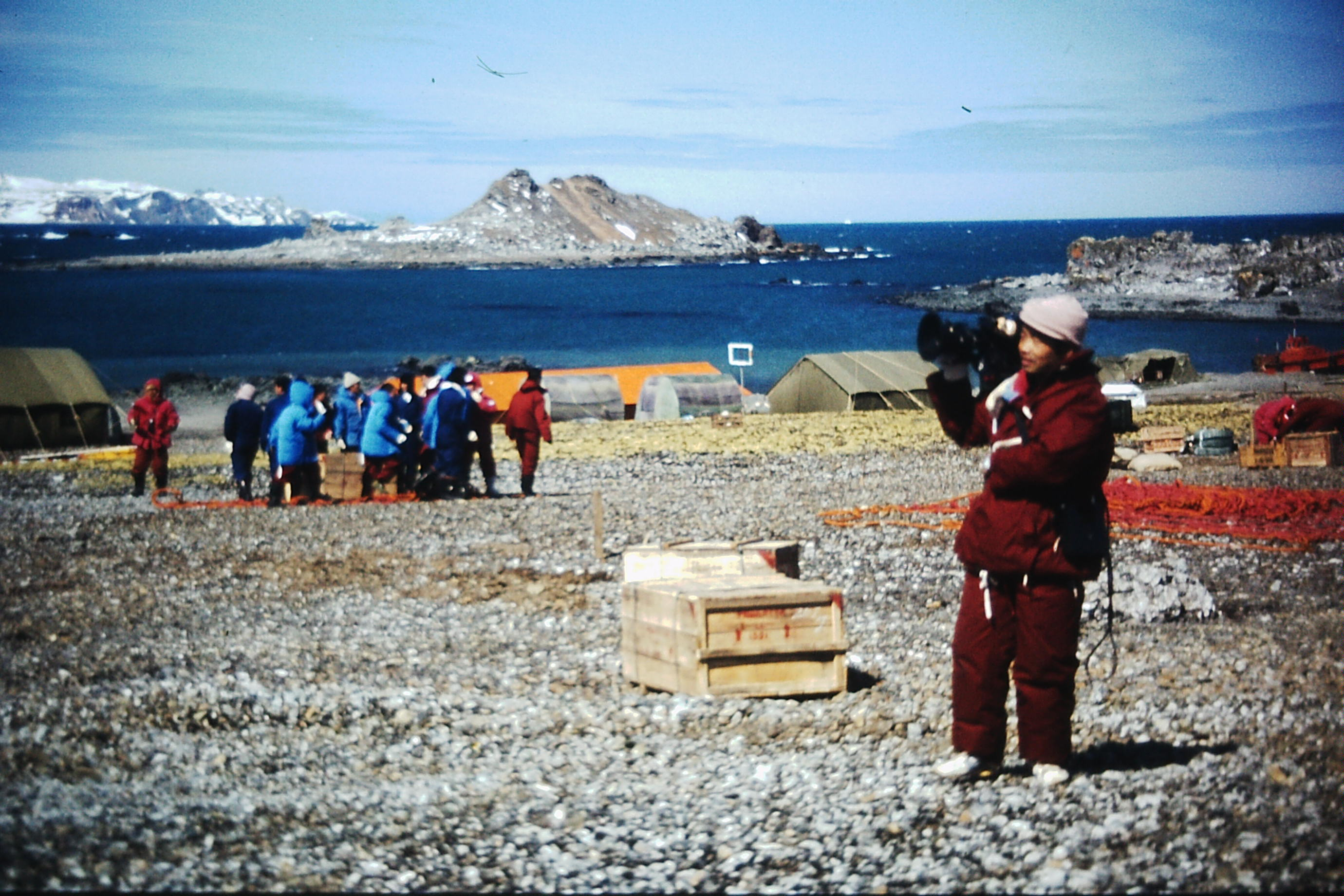
Construction of China's first antarctic base in January 1985, the Great Wall Station.

Human habitation of King George Island is limited to research stations belonging to Argentina, Brazil, Chile, China, South Korea, Peru, Poland, Russia, Uruguay, and the United States. Most of these stations are permanently staffed, carrying out research in areas as diverse as biology, ecology, geology, and palaeontology.

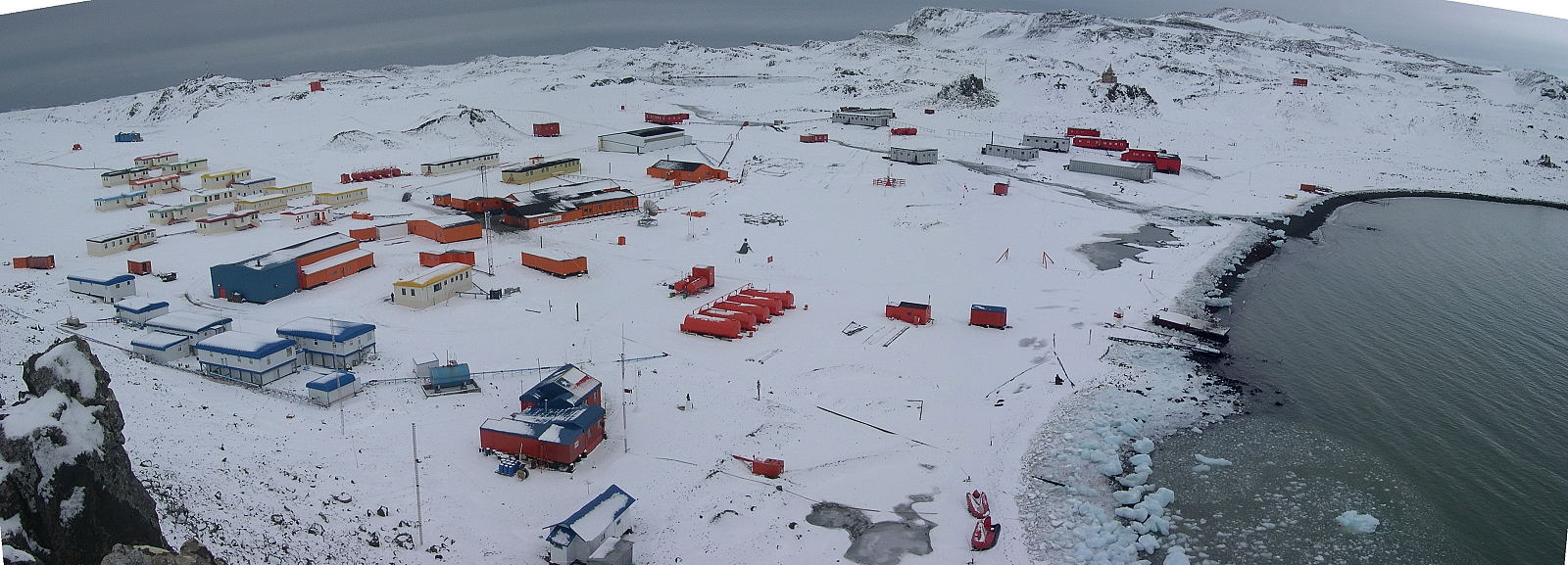
Chilean base Frei and Russian Bellingshausen (on the right)

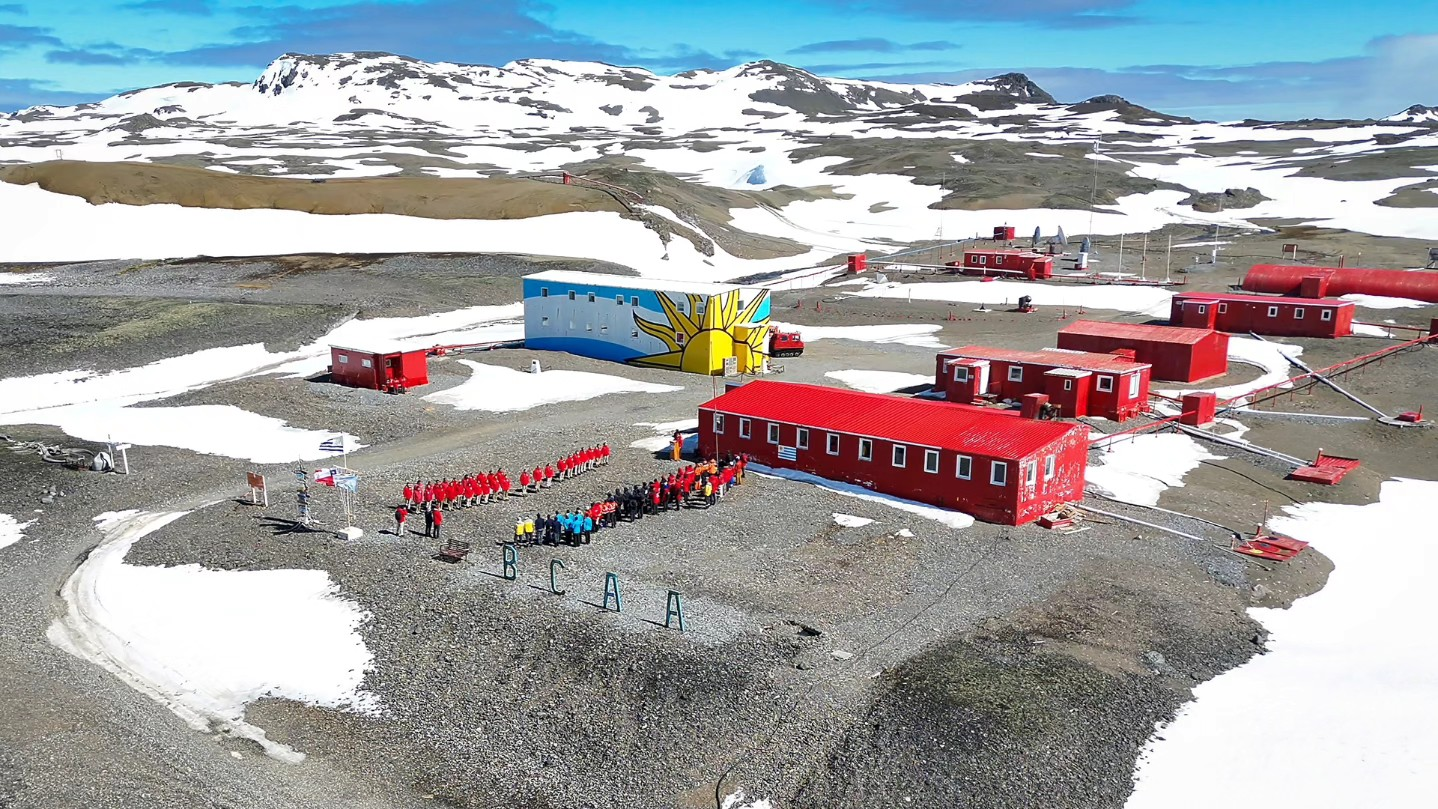
Uruguayan Artigas Base located on the Fildes Peninsula.

Base Presidente Eduardo Frei Montalva, the Chilean Station on the Fildes Peninsula, is operated as a permanent village including the Teniente Rodolfo Marsh Martin Airport with a large hangar and control tower along with other buildings, cafeterias for personnel of its several agencies there, a bank, a post office and comfortable ranch-style family homes. The Chinese Great Wall base features an indoor multipurpose room which serves as a full-size basketball court.

In 2004, a Russian Orthodox church, Trinity Church, was opened on the island near Russia's Bellingshausen Station. The church, one of the southernmost in the world and one of the few permanent structures in Antarctica, is permanently staffed by a priest. The first attempted murder in Antarctica occurred on the island in 2018 at Bellingshausen Station.

Point Thomas lighthouse at Arctowski Station is the most southerly lighthouse of the world.

NOAA runs Lenie Base, a seasonal research station for penguin studies on Admiralty Bay. This small station, dubbed Copacabana, operates in the Antarctic summer only, but is used as a survival hut in the winter.

=== Tourism ===
In October 2013, American heavy metal band Metallica announced that it would perform a concert sponsored by The Coca-Cola Company at Carlini Station heliport. The concert took place on 8 December 2013.

A small amount of specialised tourist activity also takes place during summer, including an annual marathon, known as the Antarctica Marathon.

== Climate ==
The Antarctic Peninsula and its nearby islands are considered to have the mildest living conditions in Antarctica. The island's climate is strongly influenced by the surrounding ocean. Under the Köppen system, it is one of the few locations in Antarctica classified as a tundra climate rather than an ice cap climate. Variation in temperatures are small, with the coldest month, July, averaging −6.5 °C (20.3 °F) and 1.5 °C (34.7 °F) in the warmest month. With only 591.3 hours of sunshine per year, the weather is often unsettled and cloudy throughout the year, with precipitation in the form of snow, rain, and drizzle occurring often. On average, 729 mm of precipitation falls per year.

Climate data for Bellingshausen Station (Collins Harbour, King George Island) (1968–2014)
Month	Jan	Feb	Mar	Apr	May	Jun	Jul	Aug	Sep	Oct	Nov	Dec	Year
Mean daily maximum °C (°F)	3.3 (37.9)	3.3 (37.9)	2.1 (35.8)	0.2 (32.4)	−1.5 (29.3)	−3.1 (26.4)	−3.8 (25.2)	−3.6 (25.5)	−2.0 (28.4)	−0.9 (30.4)	0.4 (32.7)	2.0 (35.6)	−0.3 (31.5)
Daily mean °C (°F)	1.5 (34.7)	1.5 (34.7)	0.4 (32.7)	−1.7 (28.9)	−3.6 (25.5)	−5.6 (21.9)	−6.5 (20.3)	−6.2 (20.8)	−4.4 (24.1)	−2.6 (27.3)	−1.1 (30.0)	0.4 (32.7)	−2.3 (27.9)
Mean daily minimum °C (°F)	0.1 (32.2)	0.1 (32.2)	−1.3 (29.7)	−3.8 (25.2)	−6.0 (21.2)	−8.3 (17.1)	−9.7 (14.5)	−9.3 (15.3)	−7.1 (19.2)	−4.7 (23.5)	−2.7 (27.1)	−1.0 (30.2)	−4.5 (23.9)
Average precipitation mm (inches)	54.4 (2.14)	66.4 (2.61)	72.1 (2.84)	65.6 (2.58)	60.6 (2.39)	53.4 (2.10)	60.5 (2.38)	62.1 (2.44)	59.8 (2.35)	54.6 (2.15)	46.7 (1.84)	46.0 (1.81)	702.2 (27.65)
Average relative humidity (%)	87.8	88.8	88.3	88.0	88.2	87.6	88.5	88.6	89.6	88.8	88.4	88.3	88.4
Mean monthly sunshine hours	89.3	66.2	54.4	28.4	13.9	3.8	9.0	28.5	48.1	70.9	83.2	95.5	591.2
Source: Arctic and Antarctic Research Institute

Climate data for Base Frei (Fildes Bay, King George Island)
Month	Jan	Feb	Mar	Apr	May	Jun	Jul	Aug	Sep	Oct	Nov	Dec	Year
Record high °C (°F)	13.0 (55.4)	9.2 (48.6)	8.3 (46.9)	5.9 (42.6)	4.6 (40.3)	4.2 (39.6)	5.0 (41.0)	3.8 (38.8)	4.4 (39.9)	4.4 (39.9)	6.0 (42.8)	8.2 (46.8)	13.0 (55.4)
Mean daily maximum °C (°F)	2.7 (36.9)	2.9 (37.2)	2.2 (36.0)	0.6 (33.1)	−0.8 (30.6)	−1.5 (29.3)	−0.9 (30.4)	−2.2 (28.0)	−1.3 (29.7)	−0.8 (30.6)	0.0 (32.0)	2.1 (35.8)	0.3 (32.5)
Daily mean °C (°F)	1.5 (34.7)	1.6 (34.9)	0.4 (32.7)	−1.7 (28.9)	−3.8 (25.2)	−5.5 (22.1)	−6.5 (20.3)	−6.5 (20.3)	−4.5 (23.9)	−2.6 (27.3)	−1.0 (30.2)	0.6 (33.1)	−2.3 (27.9)
Mean daily minimum °C (°F)	0.3 (32.5)	0.6 (33.1)	−1.2 (29.8)	−4.8 (23.4)	−8.2 (17.2)	−9.4 (15.1)	−13.2 (8.2)	−11.3 (11.7)	−8.0 (17.6)	−5.6 (21.9)	−2.8 (27.0)	−0.3 (31.5)	−5.3 (22.5)
Record low °C (°F)	−5.1 (22.8)	−5.8 (21.6)	−9.9 (14.2)	−16.8 (1.8)	−23.6 (−10.5)	−24.2 (−11.6)	−28.5 (−19.3)	−28.7 (−19.7)	−23.0 (−9.4)	−17.0 (1.4)	−10.7 (12.7)	−6.8 (19.8)	−28.7 (−19.7)
Average precipitation mm (inches)	53.8 (2.12)	52.3 (2.06)	52.5 (2.07)	46.6 (1.83)	31.0 (1.22)	29.2 (1.15)	32.2 (1.27)	34.5 (1.36)	42.0 (1.65)	47.7 (1.88)	41.0 (1.61)	30.1 (1.19)	492.9 (19.41)
Average relative humidity (%)	91	89	89	89	88	90	89	88	89	90	89	81	89
Mean monthly sunshine hours	83.8	71.2	57.3	23.6	8.3	1.2	3.9	15.8	44.2	93.2	104.5	98.1	605.1
Source: Dirección Meteorológica de Chile (temperature data: 1970–2004, all other 1990–2000)

== See also ==
- Artigas Base
- Bolinder Bluff
- Cockscomb Hill
- Comandante Ferraz Brazilian Antarctic Base
- Composite Antarctic Gazetteer
- Henryk Arctowski Polish Antarctic Station
- Islands of Chile
- List of Antarctic and subantarctic islands
- Mersey Spit
- Plaza Point
- SCAR
- Sherratt Bay
- Stwosz Icefall
- Subantarctic
- Territorial claims in Antarctica
- Warszawa Dome
- Wawel Hill (Antarctica)
- Wesele Cove

== Bibliography ==
- Alan Gurney (1998). Below the Convergence: Voyages Toward Antarctica, 1699–1839. New York: Penguin Books.
- A. G. E. Jones (November 1975). "Captain William Smith and the Discovery of New South Shetland". Geographical Journal. Vol. 141, No. 3. pp. 445–461.
- Revista de la Asociación Geológica Argentina (in Spanish). 62 (1): pp. 35–43.
- E. Serrano (2001). "Espacios protegidos y política territorial en las islas Shetland del Sur (Antártida)". Boletín de la A.G.E. no. 31, pp. 5–21.
