= National Register of Historic Places listings in Lewis County, Washington =

Location of Lewis County in Washington

This is a list of the National Register of Historic Places listings in Lewis County, Washington.

This is intended to be a complete list of the properties and districts on the National Register of Historic Places in Lewis County, Washington, United States. Latitude and longitude coordinates are provided for many National Register properties and districts; these locations may be seen together in a map.

There are 42 properties and districts listed on the National Register in the county. Another 2 properties were once listed but have been removed.

This National Park Service list is complete through NPS recent listings posted August 7, 2026.

== Current listings ==
	Name on the Register	Image	Date listed	Location	City or town	Description
1	George E. Birge House	George E. Birge House	December 1, 1986 (#86003375)	715 E St. 46°43′26″N 122°57′20″W	Centralia	Built in the mid-1890s by a prominent lumberman, the Queen Anne-style home remains a private residence and is noted for its color scheme and turret.
2	Boistfort High School	Boistfort High School	August 6, 1987 (#87001335)	983 Boistfort Rd. 46°32′59″N 123°07′55″W	Curtis	Constructed in 1918 with a delayed opening due to the Great Influenza. Closed in 1978 after financial and maintenance difficulties.
3	Joseph Borst House	Joseph Borst House	December 27, 1977 (#77001345)	302 Bryden Ave. 46°43′13″N 122°58′55″W	Centralia	Constructed in the late-1850s for the pioneer Borst family. The preserved, Greek Revival residence is open as a historical museum.
4	Burlington Northern Depot	Burlington Northern Depot	November 6, 1974 (#74001967)	599 NW Front Street; 46°40′18″N 122°58′16″W	Chehalis	The Mission Revival depot was constructed in 1912. The site has been known as the Lewis County Historical Society and Museum since the station's closure in the 1970s.
5	Cascade School	Cascade School	February 5, 2026 (#100012691)	101 SW 2nd Street; 46°39′33″N 122°57′49″W	Chehalis	Cascade School was built in 1922, with two wings added in 1925 and 1956. Closed in 2019 due to a lack of funding for upgrades and the construction of a new school campus in Chehalis, the facility was renovated and reopened in 2025 as an apartment building.
6	Centralia Downtown Historic District	Centralia Downtown Historic District	August 18, 2003 (#03000164)	Roughly bounded by Center St., Burlington Northern right-of-way, Walnut st., and Pearl St. 46°43′02″N 122°57′13″W	Centralia	The district is home to four other NRHP sites, the Centralia Post Office and Union Depot, the McMenamins Olympic Club Saloon, and the sculpture, The Sentinel.
7	Centralia Post Office	Centralia Post Office	August 7, 1991 (#91000640)	214 W. Centralia College Blvd. 46°42′56″N 122°57′25″W	Centralia	Completed in June 1937 and dedicated later that year, the one-story Moderne post office features Tenino sandstone.
8	Centralia Union Depot	Centralia Union Depot	May 19, 1988 (#88000608)	210 Railroad St. 46°43′04″N 122°57′08″W	Centralia	Built and opened in 1912, the Mission Revival depot features a two-story main terminal and two annexes connected by breezeways. As of 2025, the station is served by Amtrak.
9	Chehalis Downtown Historic District	Chehalis Downtown Historic District	November 21, 1997 (#97001407)	Roughly bounded by Park, and Front Sts., Washington and Cascade Aves. 46°39′56″N 122°58′08″W	Chehalis	The district became the downtown of the city after fires gutted other downtown cores in the late 19th century. The historic area is home to the Chehalis Theater and St. Helens Hotel.
10	Chehalis Post Office	Chehalis Post Office	May 30, 1991 (#91000641)	225 NW Cascade Ave. 46°39′47″N 122°57′59″W	Chehalis	Completed and dedicated in January 1934, the post office is the only Georgian Revival building in the city.
11	Claquato Church	Claquato Church	April 24, 1973 (#73001882)	Off WA 6; 46°38′35″N 123°01′13″W	Claquato	Constructed on land donated by the Davis family, founders of Claquato, the Methodist church known for its "crown of thorns" steeple, was completed in 1858. It is the oldest standing church in the state.
12	Wesley Everest Gravesite	Wesley Everest Gravesite	December 17, 1991 (#91001781)	Sticklin-Greenwood Memorial Park, 1905 Johnson Rd. 46°44′11″N 122°58′51″W	Centralia	Burial plot of Wesley Everest, died from lynching after the events of the Centralia massacre.
13	Grace Evangelical Church of Vader	Grace Evangelical Church of Vader	March 28, 2003 (#03000162)	618 D St. 46°24′08″N 122°57′16″W	Vader	Built in 1902, most commonly known as the Grace United Methodist Church of Vader since 1969. Known for its belfry containing an original cast iron bell, services have been uninterrupted since its inception. Possibly one of the last remaining structures built in Vader since the turn of the 20th century.
14	Hillside Historic District	Hillside Historic District	August 1, 1996 (#96000841)	Roughly bounded by Jefferson Ave., Hill St., Washington Ave., and 9th St. 46°39′42″N 122°57′39″W	Chehalis	Begun in 1888 and mostly complete by the 1930s, the neighborhood contains a mix of residential architecture, such as American Foursquare, varieties of American Craftsman, and Tudor Revival.
15	Holy Cross Polish National Catholic Church	Holy Cross Polish National Catholic Church	September 2, 1987 (#87001456)	Third and Queen; 46°34′04″N 123°17′57″W	Pe Ell	The first, and eventually last remaining, Polish National Catholic Church (PNCC) in the state, the parish was built in 1916 by the local Polish-American community. Due to loss of membership by the late 20th century, the church fell into disrepair and was demolished in 2010.
16	Hubbard Bungalow	Hubbard Bungalow	August 24, 2005 (#05000922)	717 N. Washington Ave. 46°43′30″N 122°57′39″W	Centralia	Built for Francis Hubbard, a prominent businessman connected to the events of the Centralia massacre.
17	John R. Jackson House	John R. Jackson House	January 11, 1974 (#74001968)	At Mary's Corner, 11 mi. S of Chehalis on Jackson Hwy. 46°32′32″N 122°49′13″W	Mary's Corner	Site of possibly the first court case in the Washington Territory. It is the oldest, physically existing courthouse in the state and was the second designated state park in Washington.
18	La Wis Wis Guard Station No. 1165	La Wis Wis Guard Station No. 1165	April 8, 1986 (#86000813)	Gifford Pinchot National Forest; 46°40′36″N 121°35′00″W	Packwood	Constructed by the CCC in 1937, the 1 1/2-story guard station is located at the La Wis Wis Campgrounds. Used by the USFS until 1993, it was restored beginning in 2012.
19	Lewis County Courthouse	Lewis County Courthouse	August 18, 2014 (#14000501)	351 NW North St. 46°39′42″N 122°58′10″W	Chehalis	Neo-classical Beaux-Arts architecture courthouse completed in 1927.
20	Longmire Buildings	Longmire Buildings	May 28, 1987 (#87001338)	Longmire; 46°45′06″N 121°48′42″W	Mount Rainier National Park	A listing of three structures built in the late-1920s, the Longmire Community Building, the Administration Building, and the Longmire Service Station. Properties are situated within both Lewis and Pierce counties.
21	Longmire Campground Comfort Station No. L-302	Longmire Campground Comfort Station No. L-302	March 13, 1991 (#91000209)	Longmire; 46°44′47″N 121°48′41″W	Mount Rainier National Park	Built in c. 1930, was the first of the three National Park Service rustic style Longmire Comfort Stations constructed. Extends into Pierce County.
22	Longmire Campground Comfort Station No. L-303	Longmire Campground Comfort Station No. L-303	March 13, 1991 (#91000210)	Longmire; 46°44′41″N 121°48′41″W	Mount Rainier National Park	Constructed in 1934, matches the dimensions and exterior details of L-302 and L-305.
23	Longmire Campground Comfort Station No. L-305	Longmire Campground Comfort Station No. L-305	March 13, 1991 (#91000211)	Longmire; 46°44′36″N 121°48′44″W	Mount Rainier National Park	The last to be built in 1935, comparable to L-302 and L-303 and is unaltered. May also be listed as L-304.
24	Longmire Historic District	Longmire Historic District	March 13, 1991 (#91000173)	Longmire; 46°44′59″N 121°48′45″W	Mount Rainier National Park	District contains the largest concentration of structures constructed in National Park Service rustic architecture within Mount Rainier National Park. A total of 58 contributing buildings and structures are included in the listing.
25	O. B. McFadden House	O. B. McFadden House	April 1, 1975 (#75001861)	1639 Chehalis Ave. 46°39′29″N 122°57′54″W	Chehalis	Built for Obadiah B. McFadden, the log cabin home is the oldest structure in Lewis County and the oldest residence in Chehalis.
26	Mineral Log Lodge	Mineral Log Lodge	March 26, 1975 (#75001862)	E side of Mineral Lake on Hill Rd. 46°43′20″N 122°10′52″W	Mineral	Built in 1906 as a retreat for the wealthy, the lodge has remained in an almost unaltered state.
27	Mount Rainier National Park	Mount Rainier National Park	February 18, 1997 (#97000344)	Longmire; 46°52′59″N 121°53′04″W	Mount Rainier National Park	The park is a National Historic Landmark District, which includes 165 contributing structures and buildings.
28	Narada Falls Bridge	Narada Falls Bridge	March 13, 1991 (#91000197)	Paradise; 46°46′31″N 121°44′43″W	Mount Rainier National Park	A 36 foot (11 m)-long, stone rubble arch bridge completed in 1928 over Narada Falls. Known as the "First Crossing of the Paradise River".
29	Narada Falls Comfort Station	Narada Falls Comfort Station	March 13, 1991 (#91000208)	Paradise; 46°46′33″N 121°44′40″W	Mount Rainier National Park	The National Park Service rustic public restroom is known for its bench-lined waiting room. Built between 1941 and 1942 in a combined effort of the National Park Service and CCC due to cost overruns.
30	North Fork Guard Station No. 1142	North Fork Guard Station No. 1142	April 11, 1986 (#86000815)	Gifford Pinchot National Forest; 46°27′12″N 121°47′13″W	Randle vicinity	Built by the Civilian Conservation Corps in 1937, the designation also includes the North Fork Garage #1551.
31	Ohanapecosh Comfort Station No. O-302	Ohanapecosh Comfort Station No. O-302	March 13, 1991 (#91000203)	Mt. Rainier National Park; 46°44′13″N 121°33′53″W	Ohanapecosh	Along with No. O-303, the log beam public restroom was built in 1935 by the National Park Service and Civilian Conservation Corps.
32	Ohanapecosh Comfort Station No. O-303	Ohanapecosh Comfort Station No. O-303	March 13, 1991 (#91000204)	Mt. Rainier National Park; 46°44′10″N 121°34′01″W	Ohanapecosh	Similar in appearance, engineering, and history to No. O-302, considered National Park Service rustic architecture.
33	Ben Olsen House	Ben Olsen House	November 7, 1976 (#76001897)	S end of D St. 46°23′48″N 122°57′16″W	Vader	Built in the 1900s for lumber baron, Ben Olsen, the 2 1/2-story home is a mix of Colonial Revival, Queen Anne, and Victorian styles.
34	Olympic Club	Olympic Club	March 10, 1980 (#80004006)	112 North Tower Street; 46°43′01″N 122°57′06″W	Centralia	Connected to the historic Olympic Club Hotel, the gentleman's club was built in 1908 and rebuilt after a fire in 1913. Purchased and operated by McMenamins since 1996.
35	O. K. Palmer House	O. K. Palmer House	May 15, 1986 (#86001067)	673 N.W. Pennsylvania; 46°40′03″N 122°58′31″W	Chehalis	A 2 1/2 story, American Foursquare home, built for the founder of the Palmer Lumber and Manufacturing Company in Chehalis.
36	Pennsylvania Avenue-West Side Historic District	Pennsylvania Avenue-West Side Historic District	December 3, 1991 (#91001721)	600 block NW. St. Helens and 440-723 Pennsylvania Aves. 46°39′57″N 122°58′30″W	Chehalis	First platted and built in the 1880s, considered mostly complete by 1915.
37	Randle Ranger Station-Work Center	Randle Ranger Station-Work Center	April 8, 1986 (#86000816)	Gifford Pinchot National Forest; 46°32′08″N 121°57′28″W	Randle	Constructed by the CCC in the mid-1930s, the listing includes seven buildings in National Park Service rustic-style.
38	Scout Lodge	Scout Lodge	September 15, 2004 (#04001007)	278 SE Adams Ave. 46°39′47″N 122°57′34″W	Chehalis	Also known as the Troop 373 and Troop 7373 Scout Lodge. Built by the Works Progress Administration.
39	St. Helens Hotel	St. Helens Hotel	October 8, 1991 (#91001497)	440 N. Market Blvd. 46°39′53″N 122°58′02″W	Chehalis	Originally a wooden hotel in the 1890s, the brick and concrete structure was rebuilt and expanded in the late 1910s.
40	The Sentinel	The Sentinel	December 17, 1991 (#91001782)	Washington Park, bounded by Main, Pearl, Locust and Silver; 46°42′59″N 122°57′19″W	Centralia	Created by Alonzo Victor Lewis and dedicated in 1924. Honors the loss of American Legion members during the Centralia Tragedy.
41	Three Lakes Patrol Cabin	Three Lakes Patrol Cabin	March 13, 1991 (#91000189)	Mt. Rainier National Park; 46°45′51″N 121°28′21″W	Ohanapecosh	The single-room, log cabin structure was originally built as a shelter and operations base for district park rangers.
42	Wolfenbarger Site		May 2, 1977 (#77001346)	Address Restricted	Curtis	A rare, undisturbed Native American archaeological site in the state.

== Former listings ==
	Name on the Register	Image	Date listed	Date removed	Location	City or town	Description
1	Doty Bridge		July 16, 1982 (#82004260)	July 16, 1990	Spanning the Chehalis River	Doty	One of the last remaining covered railroad bridges in Washington state, the span was completed by 1926. Reported by the state as destroyed in 1990.
2	Weyerhaeuser Pe Ell Bridge	Weyerhaeuser Pe Ell Bridge	July 26, 1982 (#82004261)	July 16, 1990	South of Pe Ell, spanning the Chehalis River	Pe Ell	Covered wooden bridge carrying a water main for the town of Pe Ell over the Chehalis River. The bridge was declared destroyed by the state in 1990 and remnants were washed away during the Great Coastal Gale of 2007.

== See also ==
- Media related to National Register of Historic Places in Lewis County, Washington at Wikimedia Commons
- List of National Historic Landmarks in Washington (state)
- National Register of Historic Places listings in Washington state
