= Longmire =

Longmire may refer to:

- Longmire (surname)
- Longmire, Washington, a historic district in Mount Rainier National Park, Washington, United States
  - Longmire Buildings, historic buildings in the district
- The Walt Longmire Mysteries, series of novels by Craig Johnson
  - Walt Longmire, the titular character of the Walt Longmire mysteries novels
  - Longmire (TV series), a TV series based on the novels by Craig Johnson
- 35197 Longmire, an asteroid

== See also ==
- Longmire Campground Comfort Stations
