= Longmire Campground Comfort Stations =

NRHP-listed sites in Mt. Rainier National Park

- Longmire Campground Comfort Station No. L-302
- U.S. National Register of Historic Places
- Washington State Heritage Register
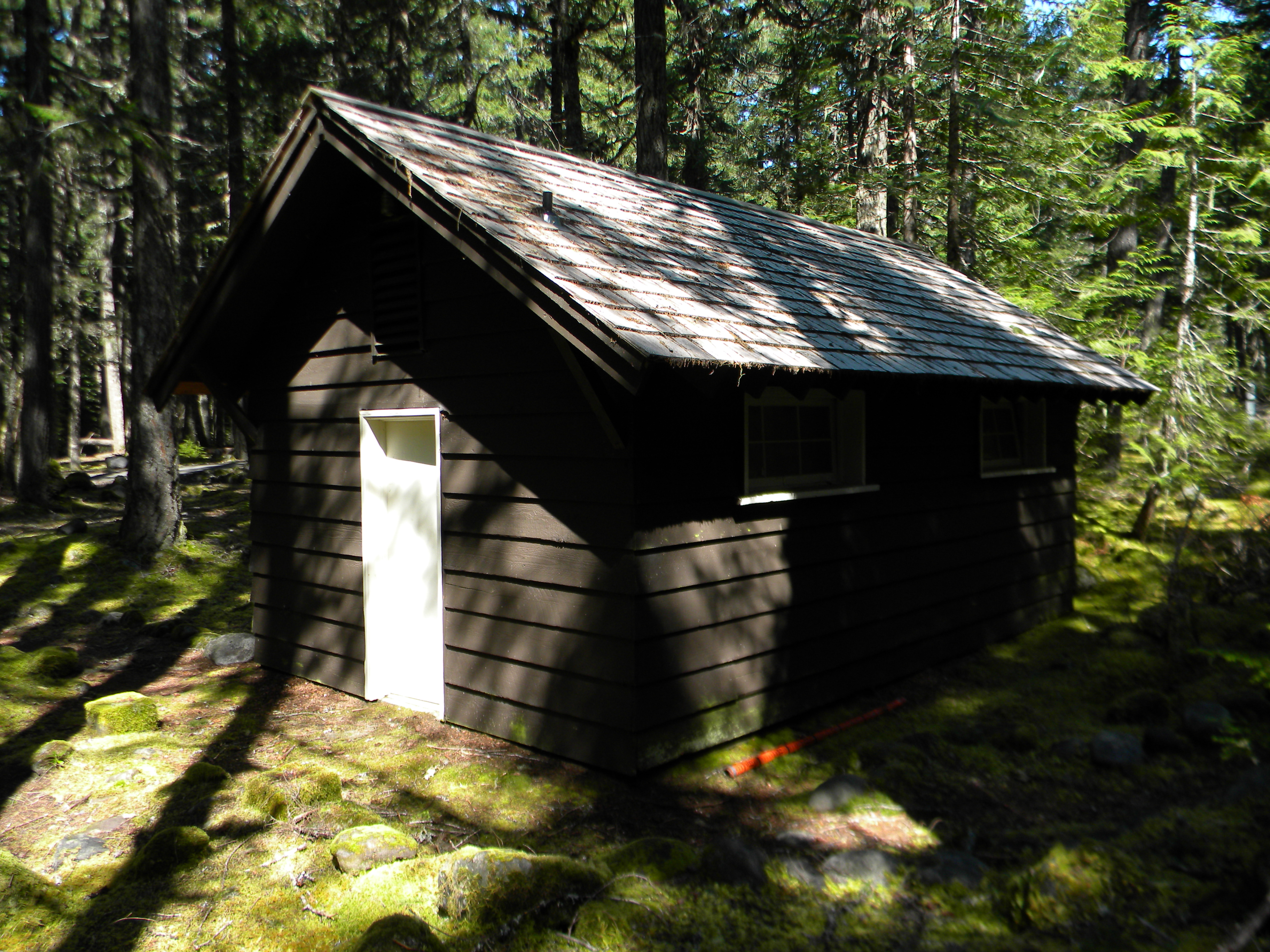
- Longmire Comfort Station No. L-302

- Location within Washington (state)
- Location: Lognmire Campground, Washington
- Nearest city: Longmire, Washington
- Coordinates: 46°44′47″N 121°48′41″W
- Area: less than one acre
- Built: 1930 approx.
- Architect: Thomas Chalmers Vint, Ernest A. Davidson
- Architectural style: National Park Service rustic
- MPS: Mt. Rainier National Park MPS
- NRHP reference No.: 91000209 (Note: As of 2025, the Longmire Campground Comfort Station No. L-302 NRHP file has not been digitized at the National Park Service website. Please review the catalogued inventory form.)

Significant dates
- Added to NRHP: March 13, 1991
- Designated WSHR: March 13, 1991

- Longmire Campground Comfort Station No. L-303
- U.S. National Register of Historic Places
- Washington State Heritage Register
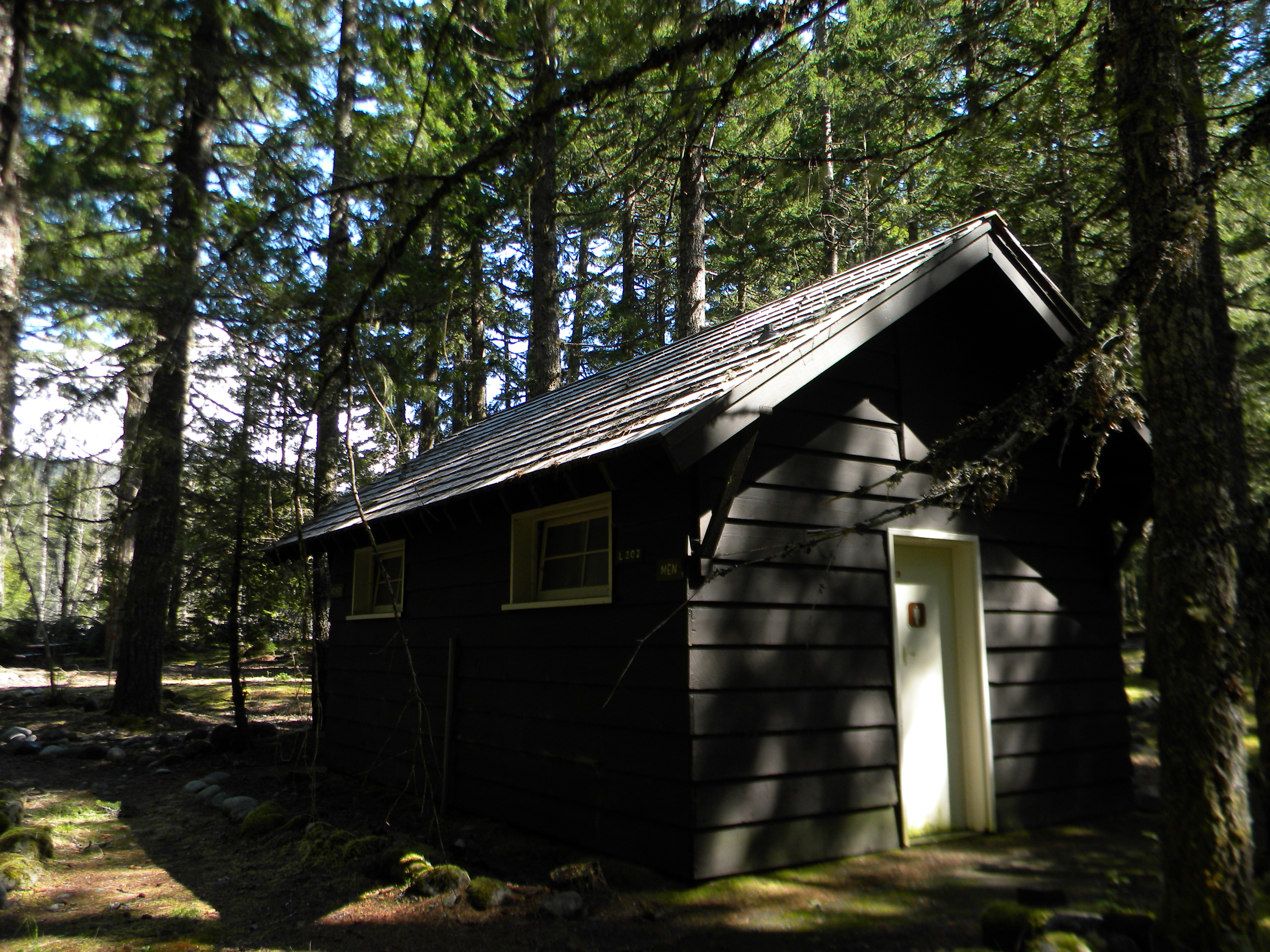
- Longmire Comfort Station No. L-303
- Built: 1934
- Architectural style: National Park Service rustic
- NRHP reference No.: 91000210 (Note: As of 2025, the Longmire Campground Comfort Station No. L-303 NRHP file has not been digitized at the National Park Service website. Please review the catalogued inventory form.)
- Added to NRHP: March 13, 1991

- Longmire Campground Comfort Station No. L-305
- U.S. National Register of Historic Places
- Washington State Heritage Register
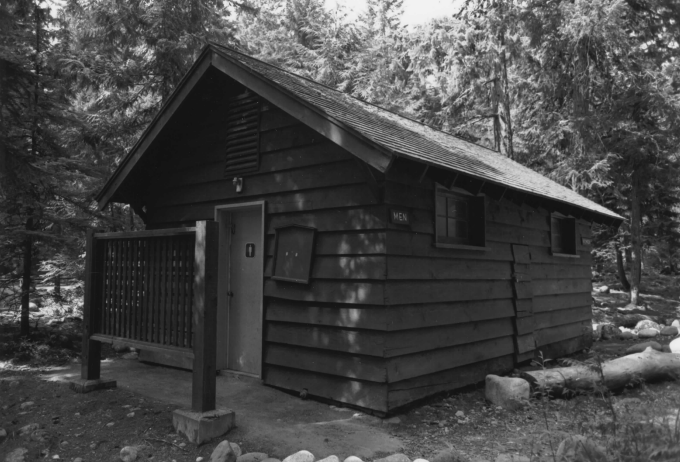
- Longmire Comfort Station No. L-305
- Built: 1935
- Architectural style: National Park Service rustic
- NRHP reference No.: 91000211 (Note: As of 2025, the Longmire Campground Comfort Station No. L-305 NRHP file has not been digitized at the National Park Service website. Please review the catalogued inventory form.)
- Added to NRHP: March 13, 1991

The Longmire Campground Comfort Stations are a group of three public restroom facilities located within the Longmire Historic District at Mount Rainier National Park. Known individually under the designations of L-302, L-303, and L-305, the stations were added to the National Register of Historic Places in 1991.

The three facilities were built between 1930 and 1935 and follow the architectural style of National Park Service rustic. The structures are considered similar in size, share comparable exterior details, and are mostly unaltered.

== History ==
The Longmmire Campground was originally built in the mid-1920s as a recreation site known as the Longmire Public Auto Camp. The early version of the site included two comfort stations, now extinct, that were constructed in 1925. The Longmire Campground Comfort Stations were built in the early and mid-1930s in Mount Rainier National Park to provide public toilet facilities to automobile tourists camping in the park at Longmire.

== Geography ==
The comfort stations form a part of the Longmire Historic District, which is itself within the Mount Rainier National Park National Historic Landmark District, comprising the entire park.

== Architecture and features ==
Unless otherwise noted, the details provided are based on the 1991 National Register of Historic Places (NRHP) inventory forms and may not reflect updates or changes to the Longmire Comfort Stations in the interim.

Designed by the National Park Service Branch of Plans and Designs, the credited architect of the three comfort stations is Thomas Chalmers Vint. The timber-frame buildings followed the tenets of the prevailing National Park Service Rustic style. Similar in dimensions, framing, and exterior details, the restrooms were meant to blend in with the natural forested setting of the site. The grounds of the campground were constructed under the oversight of Ernest A. Davidson, (Note: Davdson's first name is spelled as "Earnest" in the NRHP inventory forms.) an Associate Landscape Architect of the park service. With minor exceptions, the comfort stations are considered to be unaltered.

=== Longmire Campground Comfort Station No. L-302 ===
Comfort Station No. L-302 at the Longmire Campgrounds was constructed c. 1930 and is a 1-story, 14 ft × 20 ft (4.3 m × 6.1 m) timber frame public bathroom facility that was originally part of the Longmire Public Auto Camp.

With a medium-pitched, cedar shingle gable roof, the eaves project out over "rough lapped" siding of Douglas fir. Removal of portions of the original lattice screens at the entrances and a ridge beam are the only alterations recorded of L-302.

=== Longmire Campground Comfort Station No. L-303 ===
Similar in footprint and exterior architectural style, the L-303 station was built in 1934 over a concrete foundation. The structure has pivot windows with a finished interior that contains a concrete floor.

Mostly unaltered with the exception of a log ridge beam that was removed.

=== Longmire Campground Comfort Station No. L-305 ===
The L-305 comfort station was the last of the three restrooms to be built, completed in 1935. Similar to both other facilities in dimensions and style, the structure was recorded as having a comparable foundation, as well as flooring and windows, to station L-303. The ceiling and walls were noted for being Celotex insulation board. No alterations are mentioned.

The building was constructed to resemble two extinct comfort stations built in 1925 at the beginning of the auto park campground.

A discrepancy exists over the number designation of the comfort station. The structure's NRHP inventory form, as well as the National Historic Landmark nomination form for Mt. Rainier National Park, lists the facility under L-305. However, the NRHP Continuation Sheet in all three comfort station forms lists the building under the numeric title, L-304.

== Significance ==
The comfort stations were individually listed on National Register of Historic Places and Washington State Heritage Register on March 13, 1991. Each of the facilities were noted for their representation of National Park Service rustic architecture.
