= Ohanapecosh River =

River at Mount Rainier, Washington state

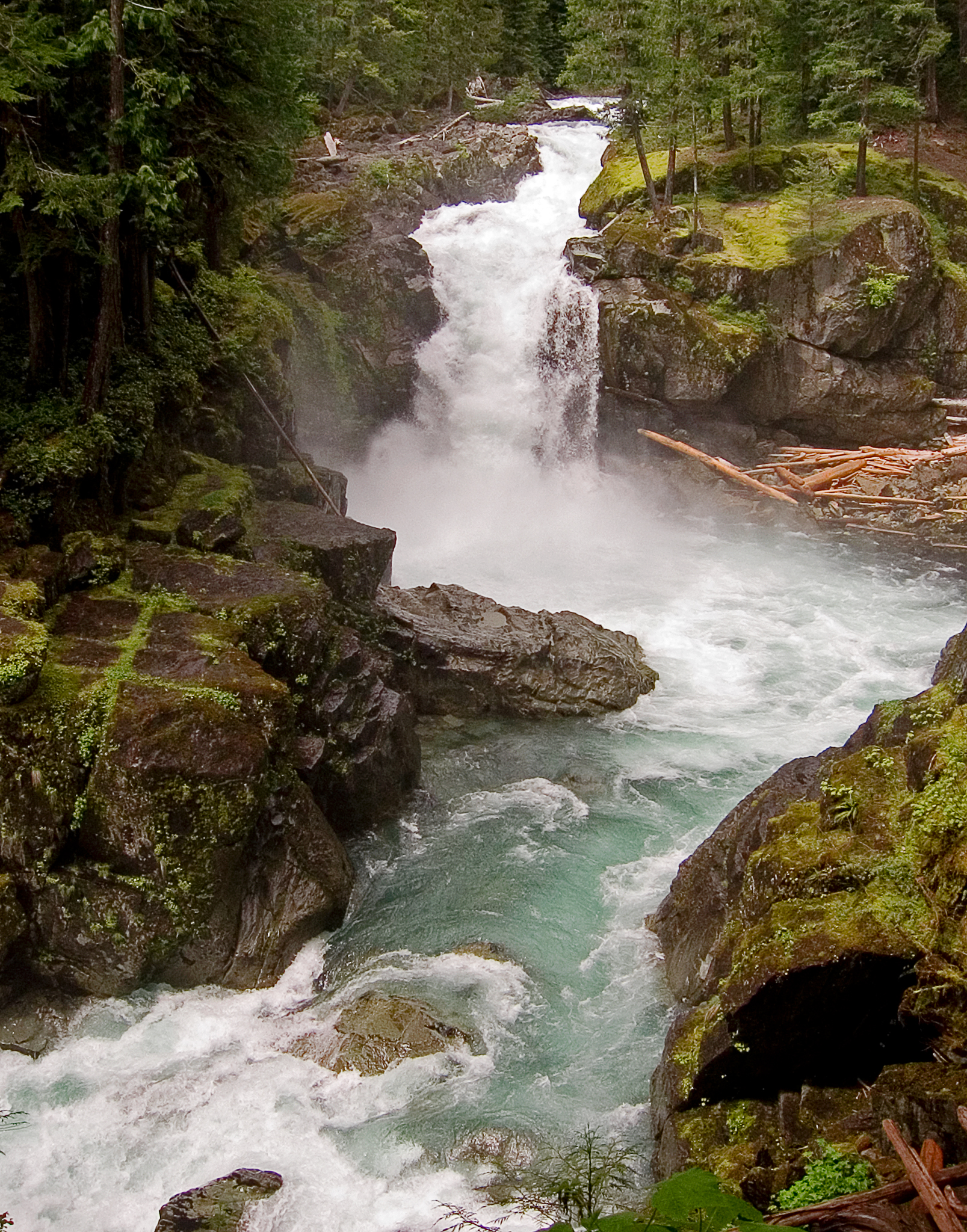
- Silver Falls on the Ohanapecosh River in Mount Rainier National Park

- Location of the mouth of the Ohanapecosh River in Washington

Location
- Country: United States
- State: Washington
- Counties: Pierce, Lewis

Physical characteristics
- Source: Ohanapecosh Glacier
  - location: Mount Rainier
  - coordinates: 46°50′0″N 121°39′26″W
  - elevation: 6,050 ft (1,840 m)
- Mouth: Cowlitz River
  - coordinates: 46°40′40″N 121°35′4″W
  - elevation: 1,230 ft (370 m)
- Length: 16 mi (26 km)
- Basin size: 68.5 sq mi (177 km^{2})
- Discharge
  - location: USGS gage 14224000 near Lewis, WA (historical: 1908-1912)
  - average: 572.92 cu ft/s (16.223 m^{3}/s)
  - minimum: 58 cu ft/s (1.6 m^{3}/s)
  - maximum: 7,500 cu ft/s (210 m^{3}/s)

Basin features
- Geographic Names Information System: 1533602

The Ohanapecosh River (/oʊˈhænəpɪkɒʃ/ oh-HAN-ə-pi-kosh) (spelled as áwxanapayk-ash in the language of the Yakima Nation and Cowlitz Tribe) is a 16-mile (26 km) river in the U.S. state of Washington.

It is the main headwater tributary of the Cowlitz River, which begins at the confluence of the Ohanapecosh River and the Clear Fork Cowlitz River. The Ohanapecosh originates near Ohanapecosh Glacier on the southeast side of Mount Rainier. Most of the river is within Mount Rainier National Park. Its final reach is in Gifford Pinchot National Forest.

Mount Rainier is the source of nine major rivers and their tributaries: the Nisqually, Puyallup, Mowich, Carbon, West Fork White, Huckleberry, White, Ohanapecosh, and Muddy Fork rivers. Of these only the Ohanapecosh and Huckleberry are non-glacial. All of these rivers empty into Puget Sound near Tacoma, Washington, except the Muddy Fork and Ohanapecosh, which flow into the Cowlitz River, a tributary of the Columbia River.

The Ohanapecosh River is named for a Taidnapam (Upper Cowlitz) Indian habitation site along the river, meaning "standing at the edge-place". The Washington Place Names database says the name may also mean "clear stream...deep blue...or deep blue holes".

== Course ==
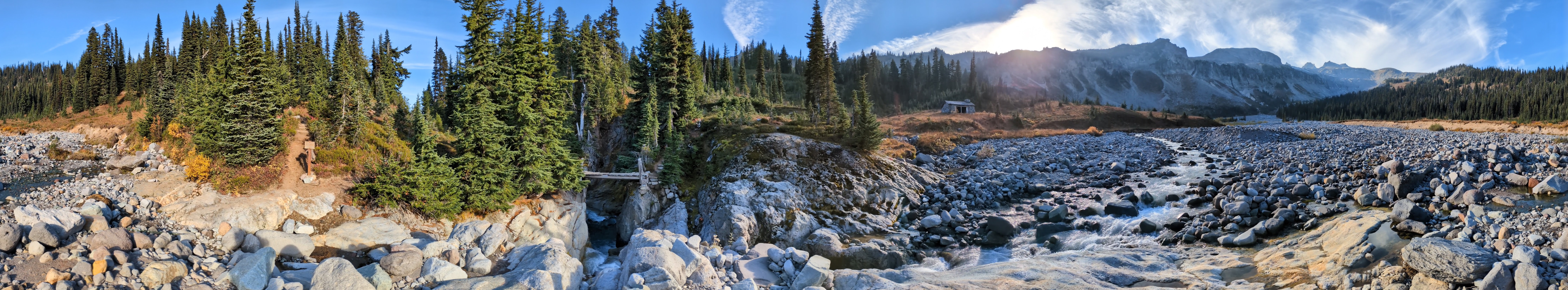
The river passing through Indian Bar (right and foreground) then going under the Wonderland Trail bridge at Wauhaukaupauken Falls (center-left)

The Ohanapecosh River originates from meltwaters of the lower part of Ohanapecosh Glacier on the southeastern slopes of Mount Rainier. It flows southeast through Indian Bar, a broad, flat area of rocky debris. At approximately Ohanapecosh river mile 15 the Ohanapecosh plunges over Wauhaukaupauken Falls. The Wonderland Trail crosses the river near the falls. North of the river there is an alpine cirque known as Ohanapecosh Park. A similar cirque to the south is called Cowlitz Park. Below Wauhaukaupauken Falls the Ohanapecosh then flows more generally east over more waterfalls. The tributary Boulder Creek joins from the north.

Below Boulder Creek the Ohanapecosh flows southeast. At approximately river mile 10.5 the Eastside Trail crosses the river near a waterfall. Then the river is joined by Chinook Creek from the north. The Ohanapecosh turns south and flows through a broad glacial U-shaped valley, which it shares with Washington State Route 123, east of the river, and the Eastside Trail on the west side of the river. Many tributary streams joins the river, including Panther Creek from the east and Olallie Creek from the west. Shortly below Panther Creek the Ohanapecosh exits Pierce County and enters Lewis County. Below Olallie Creek the Ohanapecosh River flows through a broad flat bottomland called Cedar Flats. The river splits into two channels which join at the south end of Cedar Flats. The Grove of the Patriarchs trail crosses the river and loops through the island created by the Ohanapecosh's channels.

Just downstream from the rejoining of the two channels the Ohanapecosh flows by the east end of Stevens Canyon Road, which joins State Route 123 near the river. The high ridge west of the Ohanapecosh River north of the Stevens Canyon entrance road is called the Cowlitz Divide. South of the Stevens Canyon entrance the ridge is called Backbone Ridge. Both form a continuous ridgeline separating the watershed of the Ohanapecosh from the Muddy Fork Cowlitz River.

The river plunges over Silver Falls near river mile 6, between Stevens Canyon Road and Laughingwater Creek.

Just below that the river is joined by Laughingwater Creek from the east. At approximately river mile 5, less than a mile below Laughingwater Creek, the Ohanapecosh flows by Ohanapecosh Hot Springs and the Ohanapecosh Campground, Visitor Center, and Ranger Station. This southeastern part of Mount Rainier National Park is known as the Ohanapecosh area. After flowing through it the river exits the national park and enters Gifford Pinchot National Forest.

Continuing south the Ohanapecosh is joined by Carlton Creek and Summit Creek from the east. Near La Wis Wis Campground the Ohanapecosh River joins the Clear Fork Cowlitz River. Below the confluence the stream is called the Cowlitz River. State Route 123 ends near La Wis Wis, joining U.S. Route 12. Route 12 continues to follow the Cowlitz River downstream.

== See also ==
- La Wis Wis Guard Station No. 1165
- List of geographic features in Lewis County, Washington
- List of rivers of Washington (state)
- Ohanapecosh Comfort Stations
- Three Lakes Patrol Cabin
