= Three Lakes Patrol Cabin =

NRHP-listed site in Mt. Rainier National Park

- U.S. National Register of Historic Places
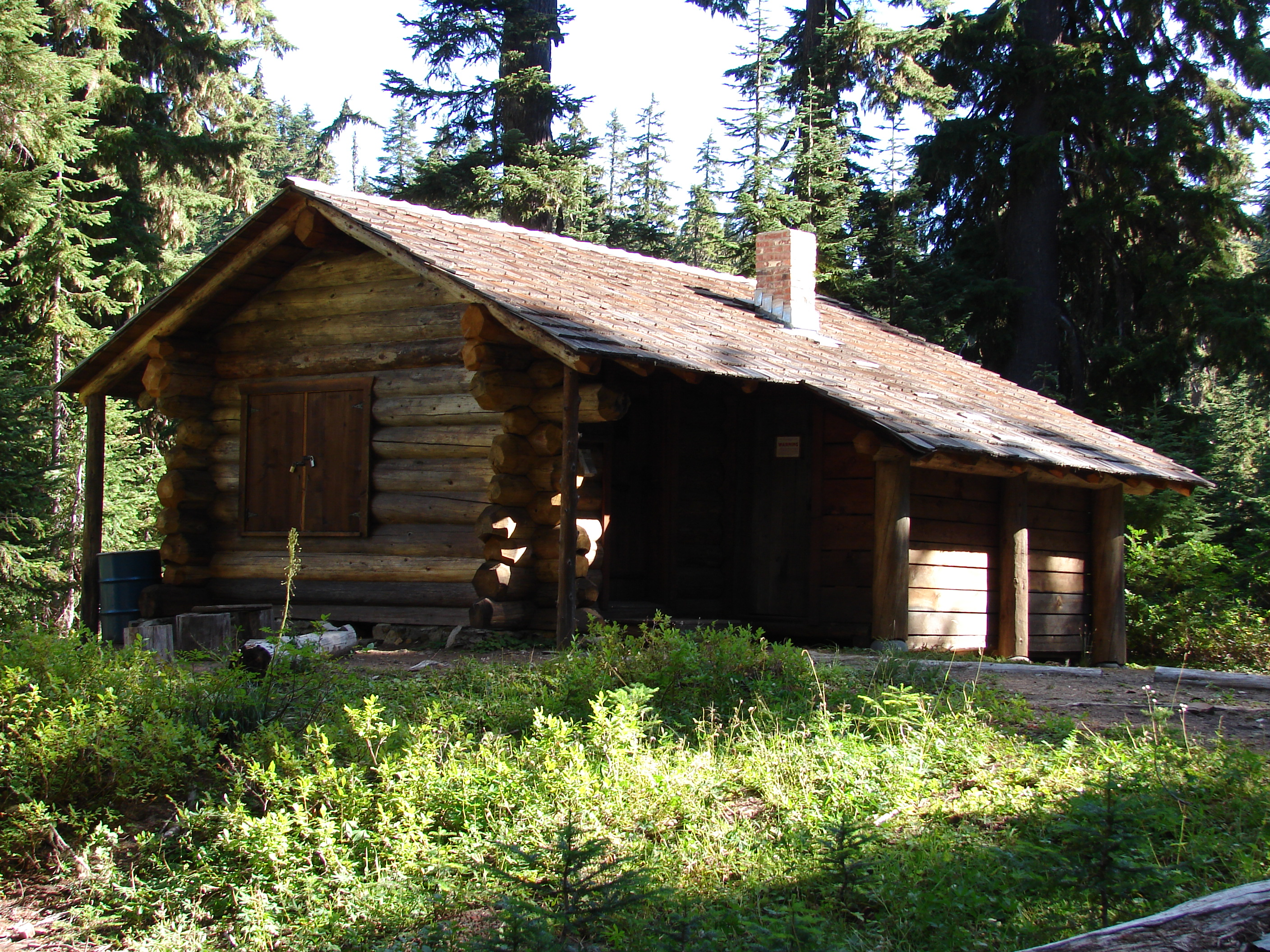
- Three Lakes Patrol Cabin, 2014

- Location within Washington (state)
- Location: Ohanapecosh Campground, Washington
- Nearest city: Packwood, Washington
- Coordinates: 46°45′51″N 121°28′21″W
- Area: less than one acre
- Built: 1934
- Architect: Thomas Chalmers Vint, W.G. Carnes
- Architectural style: Log cabin
- Website: National Park Service - Three Lakes Patrol Cabin
- MPS: Mt. Rainier National Park MPS
- NRHP reference No.: 91000189 (Note: As of 2025, the Three Lakes Patrol Cabin NRHP file has not been digitized at the National Park Service website. Please review the catalogued inventory form.)
- Added to NRHP: March 13, 1991

The Three Lakes Patrol Cabin was built in 1934 in Mount Rainier National Park as a district ranger station. The structure was added to the National Register of Historic Places in 1991.

The rustic log cabin resides near the park's Three Lakes and is a single-room building featuring exposed log beam gables, rafters, and walls with saddle notch corners. A storage shed is built on the front exterior and the cabin rests on a stone foundation. The interior is mostly unadorned and features exposed log beams.

At the time of the NRHP nomination, the structure was noted to be in fair condition yet representative of ranger patrol stations constructed throughout Mt. Rainier National Park. No longer occupied on a full-time basis, the Three Lakes Patrol Cabin is used temporarily particularly during hunting season or as a shelter for backcountry patrols by park rangers.

== History ==
Three Lakes Patrol Cabin was built in 1934 based on a standard plan originally designed by W.G. Carnes, Acting Chief Architect of the National Park Service Branch of Plans and Designs. The construction was supervised by Thomas Chalmers Vint, Chief Architect, and Edwin A. Nickel, Associate Structural Engineer.

The initial purpose of the structure was to be "a resting place" for the district park ranger "while on patrol duty" and as a "temporary headquarters during hunting and fire seasons". By the time of the National Register of Historic Places (NRHP) nomination in 1991, the cabin was not used as a full-time station. Assigned district rangers continued to use the cabin as an operational base mostly during backcountry patrols and hunting season.

The rustic cabin was noted to be undergoing restoration in 2005.

== Geography ==
The Three Lakes Patrol Cabin is located with Mt. Rainier National Park, northeast of Ohanapecosh Campgrounds and the community of Packwood on Washington State Route 123. The structure is situated near the Three Lakes in the park.

== Architecture and features ==
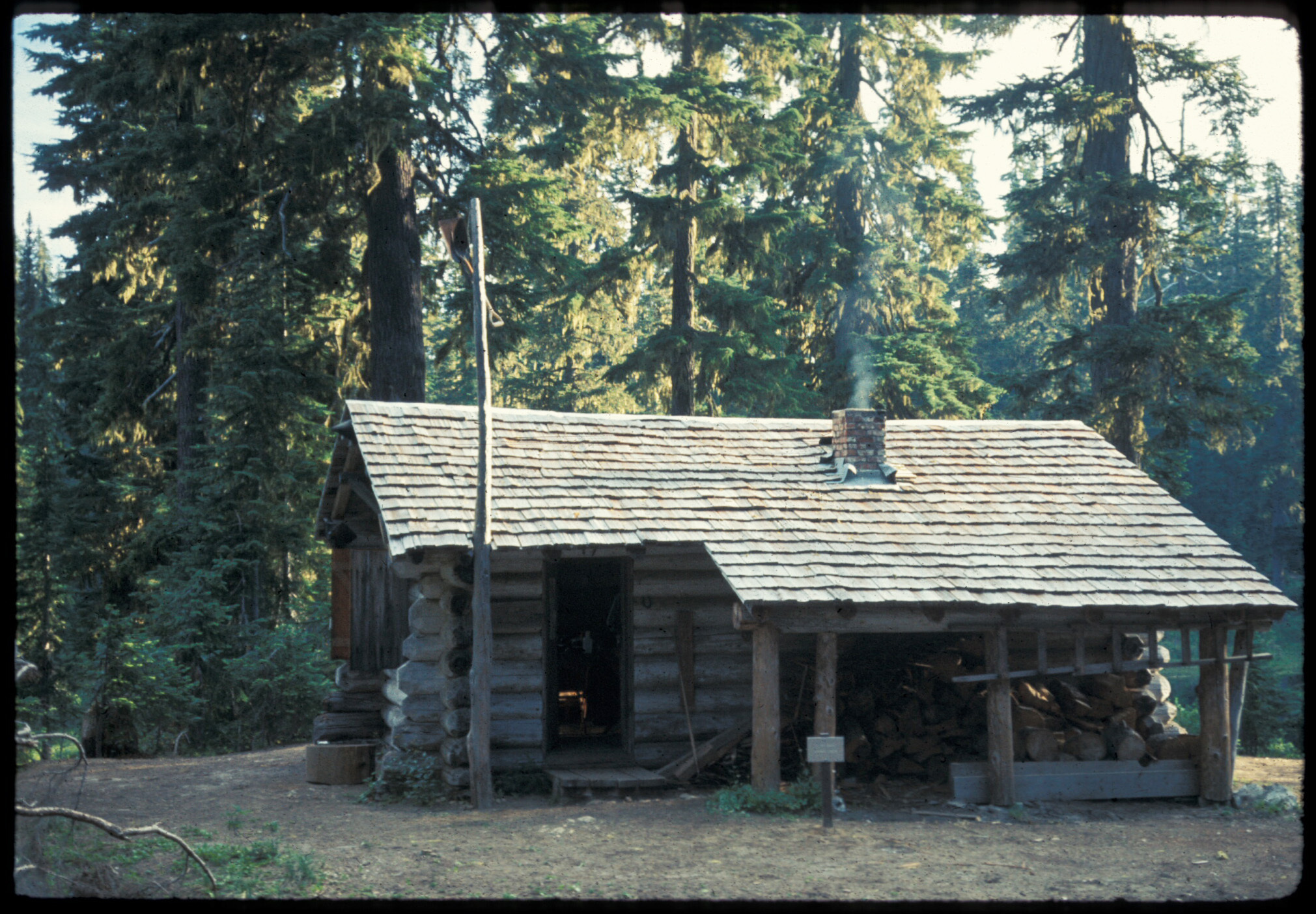
Cabin with flagpole, 1968

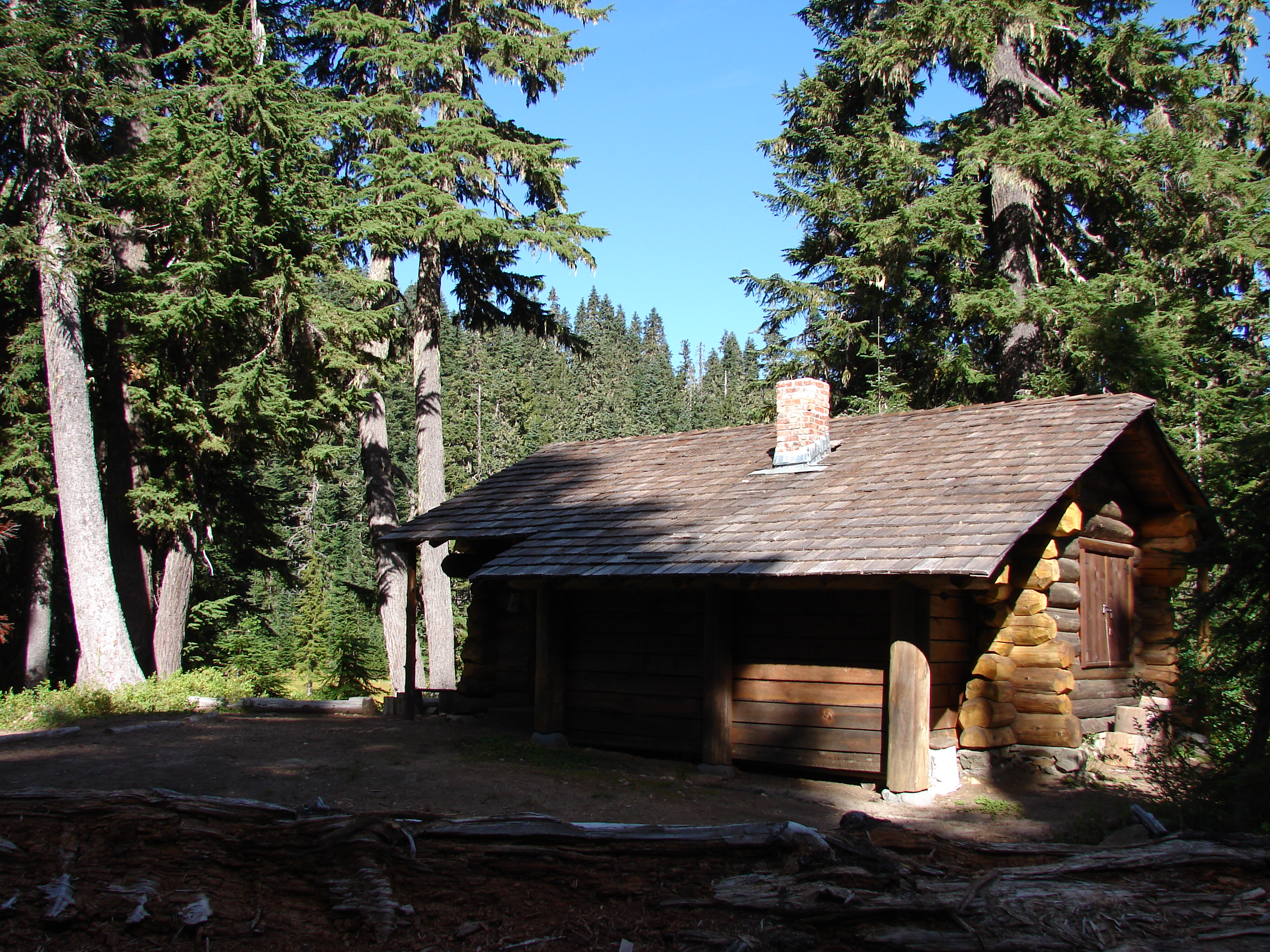
Alternate front view with enclosed storage shed, 2014

Unless otherwise noted, the details provided are based on the 1991 National Register of Historic Places (NRHP) inventory form and may not reflect updates or changes to Three Lakes Patrol Cabin in the interim.

The log cabin is a single-room, one-story structure of rectangular shape. Measured at 13.5 ft × 24 ft (4.1 m × 7.3 m), the building rests on a stone masonry foundation. The cabin is a simple gable structure with a medium-pitched cedar roof. A shed roof over the front door, supported by brackets, contains a log post-and-beam supported storage area with dimensions listed at 6 ft × 16 ft (1.8 m × 4.9 m). Bracketing detail is similar under the eaves. At the gable ends, the saddle notched log rafters and walls project prominently at the corners. Exposed log ends are whittled.

Exterior details include a brick veneer chimney stack protruding from the front roof and double-hung sash windows with accompanying hinged shutters. The cabin features two entrances, a front door to the left of the shed storage area and a rear door centrally located on the back wall.

The interior of the structure is unfinished apart from a tongue and groove wood floor. Exposed rafters and ceiling joists, along with 1 in (2.5 cm) thick, 8 in (20 cm) wide sheathing dominate the ceiling.

The NRHP inventory form declared the Three Lakes Patrol Cabin to be in fair condition. Numerous log beam ends of the walls, joists, and purlins were noted for extensive rot, capped with metal to prevent further deterioration.

== Recreation ==
Three Lakes Patrol Cabin is located on the Laughingwater Creek Trail which travels approximately 6 miles (9.7 km) from a trailhead at Stevens Canyon to Three Lakes. An abandoned path, known as the Boundary Trail that once followed the borders of Mt. Rainier National Park, is suspected to be near the patrol cabin.

== Significance ==
The cabin was placed on the National Register of Historic Places on March 13, 1991. The structure was noted under the NRHP inventory form as being a significant example of patrol cabins and trail shelters constructed throughout Mt. Rainier National Park.
