= La Wis Wis Guard Station No. 1165 =

NRHP-listed site in Gifford Pinchot National Forest

- U.S. National Register of Historic Places
- Washington State Heritage Register
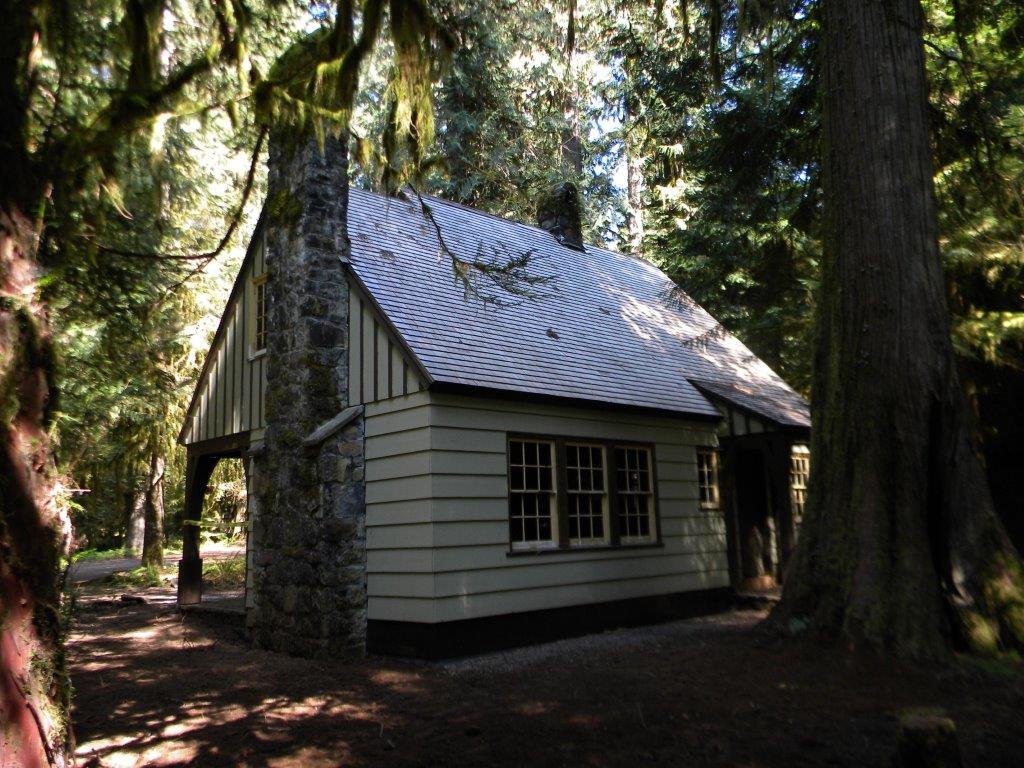
- La Wis Wis Guard Station No. 1165

- Location within Washington (state)
- Location: La Wis Wis Campground, Packwood, Washington
- Coordinates: 46°40′36″N 121°35′0″W
- Area: less than one acre
- Built: 1937
- Built by: Civilian Conservation Corps
- Architect: USDA Forest Service Architecture Group
- Architectural style: National Park Service rustic
- Restored: 2012, 2023
- Restored by: USFS staff and Passport in Time program; White Pass Country Historical Society and Museum
- Website: USFS - La Wis Wis Campground
- MPS: Depression Era Buildings
- NRHP reference No.: 86000813

Significant dates
- Added to NRHP: April 8, 1986
- Designated WSHR: April 8, 1986

La Wis Wis Guard Station No. 1165 is located in Gifford Pinchot National Forest near Packwood, Washington. The station was built by the Civilian Conservation Corps in 1937 and added to the National Register of Historic Places in 1986. The guard station is part of La Wis Wis Campgrounds, a former plant harvesting site of the Cowlitz people, in which gathered materials were used for medicinal purposes or to create baskets.

The name, La Wis Wis, is taken from a female indigenous spirit, who along with her spirit husband, made the area her home. The campground was formally given the name in 1935.

The guard station remained in use by the United States Forest Service (USFS) from its construction into 1993, remaining in an unaltered state. The neglected structure deteriorated but was restored over three years beginning in 2012. An additional effort to renovate the station began in 2023.

The 1 1/2-story building is considered under the USFS architectural style, "Northwest rustic", one of only two such builds under the agency in the Pacific Northwest. The most recognized feature of the station is a stone rubble chimney with a vaulted cap. Various sets of windows and clapboard alignments are additional details of note.

== Etymology ==
La Wis Wis is either an indigenous term translated as "rivers running together", or the name of a Native American girl or spirit given a nobility title of princess.

La-wis-wis, described as a "valley maiden", "nymph", or as the "queen of love" with "dominion" over butterflies and songbirds, was spouse to Ne-ka-na, the great spirit of the air and mountains. Her physical appearance was noted to be slender, with golden hair and blue, but dark, eyes. Also a spirit, born out of the earth by the Great Spirit, the married couple journeyed to Tahoma, building a lodge near a "stream of laughing water". Another spiritual telling mentions her husband, also spelled as Nekhani, as having created the lands around Mount Rainier as an expression of love for La-wis-wis.

A jealous, "wicked hideous" spirit, Memalek, attempted to poison La-wis-wis as she slept on a bed of white roses. Saved by her husband who transformed the flowers into thorny red roses, Memalek and the poisonous creatures she called upon for the attack, were pierced and wounded, retreating forever away to the depths of the Cowlitz Canyon. La-wis-wis survived, though considered frail. She is believed by the Cowlitz people to sleep forever in the area, in the Valley of Paradise at the base of the Mountain-That-Was-God. Her resting place is known to be abundant with butterflies. A white rose that grows in the area is also known as the la-wis-wis rose.

== History ==
=== La Wis Wis Campground ===
Before pioneer settlement, La Wis Wis was a harvest site of the Upper Cowlitz, collecting cedar roots for basket making and red alder for dyes. Plants in the area, such as Eastern lily, ferns, and violets, were gathered for medicinal use. The Cowlitz tribe, the lekla'lwit, lived near the site.

The grounds was first homesteaded in the 1890s by Grant Purcell, who wrote letters to the local United States Forest Service (USFS) outpost that the land was an excellent place for a public park. Purcell later deeded the grounds for such. A recreational camp was built by the Civilian Conservation Corps (CCC) in the 1930s, first named as the Clear Fork Campground. The site was renamed to La Wis Wis during a dedication ceremony on July 20, 1935. (Note: Early accounts of the La Wis Wis campground and surrounding area often spelled the name as Lawiswis or La-wis-wis, among other variants. See sources throughout the page for the discrepancies.) The crowd, estimated to be the largest ever assembled in Eastern Lewis County at the time, included dignitaries and prominent businessmen from around the region and neighboring counties. Governor Clarence D. Martin was in attendance. The renaming was based on the requirement to find a "suitable Indian name" for the newly constructed camp.

La Wis Wis was considered well-kept and constructed, referred to as the "highest type of forest camp". As such, the campground was specifically chosen as the site for the 1949 dedication of Gifford Pinchot National Forest. A rededication was held 50 years later in September 1999 at La Wis Wis; a protest was held before the event over a United States Senate-approved land swap, exchanging parts of several national forests in the state, including Gifford Pinchot, for 46,000 acres (19,000 ha) in the Alpine Lakes Wilderness.

The campground was expanded beginning in 1962. After a large December 1964 storm, the grounds were closed temporarily into May 1965 due to excessive damages from flooding and wind. That same year, La Wis Wis became the first USFS campsite in the Randle-Packwood district to require a daily fee or annual pass. (Note: The daily fee and pass were required during the summer season at the time. The annual fee was $7.) The site was closed again in 1976 as a safety precaution over concerns of diseased, rotting, and falling trees.

The campground had long been used for an annual community barbecue picnic for the town of Packwood, serving food to over 1,000 people at its peak.

=== La Wis Wis Guard Station No. 1165 ===
The guard station was constructed by the CCC in 1937 and remained in use by the USFS into 1993. Unused and neglected, the building began to deteriorate due to water damages; a two-phase restoration effort to preserve the station began in 2012. The project's purpose also included using the station as a rental, helping to raise money for maintenance costs at the campground. An additional renovation was begun in 2023.

== Geography ==
The guard station is located in Lewis County at La Wis Wis Campground approximately 7 miles (11 km) east of Packwood; the campground resides within Gifford Pinchot National Forest. Southeast of Mount Rainier, the site is situated off U.S. Route 12 at a triple-confluence of Ohanapecosh River, Purcell Creek, and the Cowlitz River. The Cowlitz passes the outer edge of the grounds which is located within an old-growth forest.

An investigation by Stacker.com in 2022 declared the historic station to be of "relatively high risk" to river flooding.

== Architecture and features ==
Unless otherwise noted, the details provided are based on the 1986 National Register of Historic Places (NRHP) nomination form and may not reflect updates or changes to La Wis Wis Guard Station No. 1165 in the interim.

The La Wis Wis Guard Station is a 1 1/2 story, 25 ft × 32 ft (7.6 m × 9.8 m) rectangular building situated on a poured concrete foundation. The structure is classified under a "Northwest rustic" architectural style used by the United States Forest Service during the Great Depression. As such, the station was noted to be just one of two buildings to be built under the design in the Pacific Northwest. It was designed by the Region 6 architects of the United States Forest Service. At the time of the historic designation, the station was noted to be unaltered, including any material changes, and in excellent condition.

=== Exterior ===
The exterior of the guard station is noted for a "broken coursed" stone rubble chimney with a vaulted cap. Located on the north side of the building, the chimney peaks at the gable roof line, near the east-facing front entrance. A similar vaulted chimney cap protrudes from the single peak roofline. The roof is wood-shingled and the building has projecting eaves and vergeboards; exposed rafters were also noted.

Horizonal clapboard sheaths the exterior; the gable ends are done vertically with battens. Windows, either single, or in sets of two or three with mullions, are six-over-six, double hung sashes. Shutters on the flanking windows to the main entrance contain a simple cutout of a tree.

The recessed entrance is offset in the northeast corner of the station under a lateral gabled roof. The flagstone porch area, accesses by a single step, is supported under squared timber posts with curved brackets. A shed roof with a similar support structure protects a western, rear entrance.

=== Interior ===
The NRHP form lacks any description of the interior of the guard station. The front entrance to the building was noted to have a single-leaf, vertical paneled door.

=== Restorations ===
A two-phase, three-year project to restore the guard station to its near-original appearance began in 2012. The effort was undertaken by a joint group consisting of USFS staff, the Forest Service's Passport in Time program, and members of the White Pass White Pass Country Historical Society and Museum. The first restoration works included repairs to the floor, foundation, and roof, with subsequent upgrades to the electrical and plumbing systems. Original pine paneling, suffering from irreparable damage, was removed. The second phase focused on the installation of insulation, additional plumbing, and replacing the wall panels. The surrounding grounds were landscaped. The project remained ongoing into 2015 with the site opened on a limited basis so visitors could view workers finishing the restoration.

The station was closed to the public for a renovation project in 2023. The efforts were funded under the Great American Outdoors Act. In addition to refurbishing the site, the water system was replaced and the toilet was upgraded.

== Recreation ==
At the campground, hikers can access a trail measuring 100 yards (300 ft) to Blue Hole, located in a small canyon of the Ohanapecosh River. Other paths at the site include the Hatchery Loop trail, where trout is released into the Cowlitz River, and a trail that leads to a small waterfall. Longer hikes lead to Paradise or to Tatoosh Ridge.

The non-profit Packwood Trail Project (PTP) began efforts in 2022 to create an 8-mile (13 km) paved trail from the campground to the community of Packwood. The plans were the first attempt of the PTP organization.

== Significance ==
La Wis Wis Guard Station No. 1165 was listed on the National Register of Historic Places and Washington State Heritage Register on April 8, 1986. The building was considered a rare example of existing CCC and Forest Service architecture and was noted to be a "singular expression of early twentieth century American architectural thought". The station was further recorded by the NRHP to be of "very high" quality in both "design and execution" and was a "very good example of an architectural location" that was "invested with special aesthetic and associative values".

The connection of the construction's influence on the employment and financial benefit of the local population during the Great Depression was noted during the historical nomination. As well, the Forest Service's importance was also recorded, mentioning the purposeful and custodial roles the federal agency had in the region during the time.
