= Longmire (surname) =

Longmire is a surname, of Scottish origin.

== Notable people with the surname ==
- Adele Longmire (1918–2008), American actress
- Conrad Longmire (1921–2010), American physicist
- Ellen Longmire, American physicist and mechanical engineer
- James Longmire (1820–1897), American explorer
- John Longmire (1902–1986), British music educationalist and composer
- John Longmire (born 1970), Australian rules footballer
- Robert Longmire (born 1944), Australian rules footballer
- Tony Longmire (born 1968), American baseball player

== Fictional people ==
- Walt Longmire, a fictional character
