= Longmire Buildings =

Historic landmarks in Mount Rainier National Park

- U.S. National Register of Historic Places
- U.S. National Historic Landmark
- U.S. Historic district – Contributing property
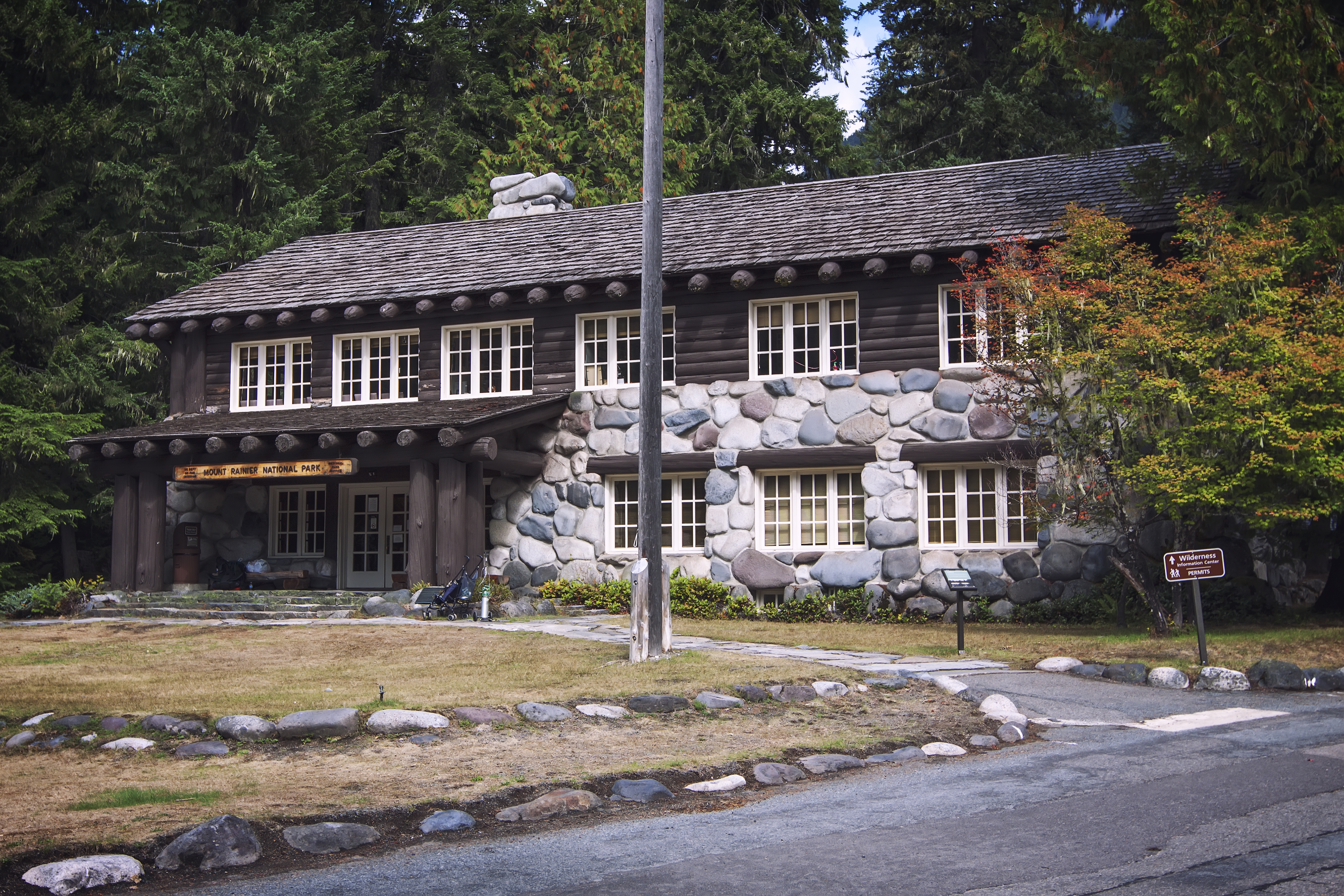
- Longmire Administration Building, 2015

- Location within Washington (state)
- Location: Longmire, Mount Rainier National Park, Washington
- Coordinates: 46°44′56″N 121°48′39″W
- Area: less than one acre
- Built: 1927
- Architectural style: National Park Service rustic
- Restored by: Ernest A. Davidson, Thomas Chalmers Vint
- Part of: Longmire Historic District (ID91000173)
- NRHP reference No.: 87001338

Significant dates
- Added to NRHP: May 28, 1987
- Designated NHL: March 13, 1991

The Longmire Buildings in Mount Rainier National Park comprise the park's former administrative headquarters, and are among the most prominent examples of the National Park Service Rustic style in the national park system. They comprise the Longmire Community Building of 1927, the Administration Building of 1928, and the Longmire Service Station of 1929. Together, these structures were designated National Historic Landmarks on May 28, 1987. The administration and community buildings were designed by National Park Service staff under the direction of Thomas Chalmers Vint.

== Administration Building ==
The Longmire Administration Building is the largest and most architecturally significant of the three structures. The two-story building features heavy boulder rubble construction to the sill line of its second floor windows, with log-frame construction above. The building is entered through a front porch constructed of unusually heavy peeled logs. As the park's administrative headquarters it housed the offices of the park superintendent and engineering support activities. After the construction of a new headquarters just outside the park's boundaries under the Mission 66 program, the Administration Building became a visitor contact point and maintenance headquarters.

Behind the entry porch, a pair of doors give access to a reception room furnished with a stone fireplace. A conference room and offices are housed on the upper level, with the basement contains mechanical equipment and a jail cell. The exterior corners of the building are buttressed with stone pilasters at the corners. Log planks sheathe the upper level above the sill, giving the appearance of log construction.

== Community Building ==
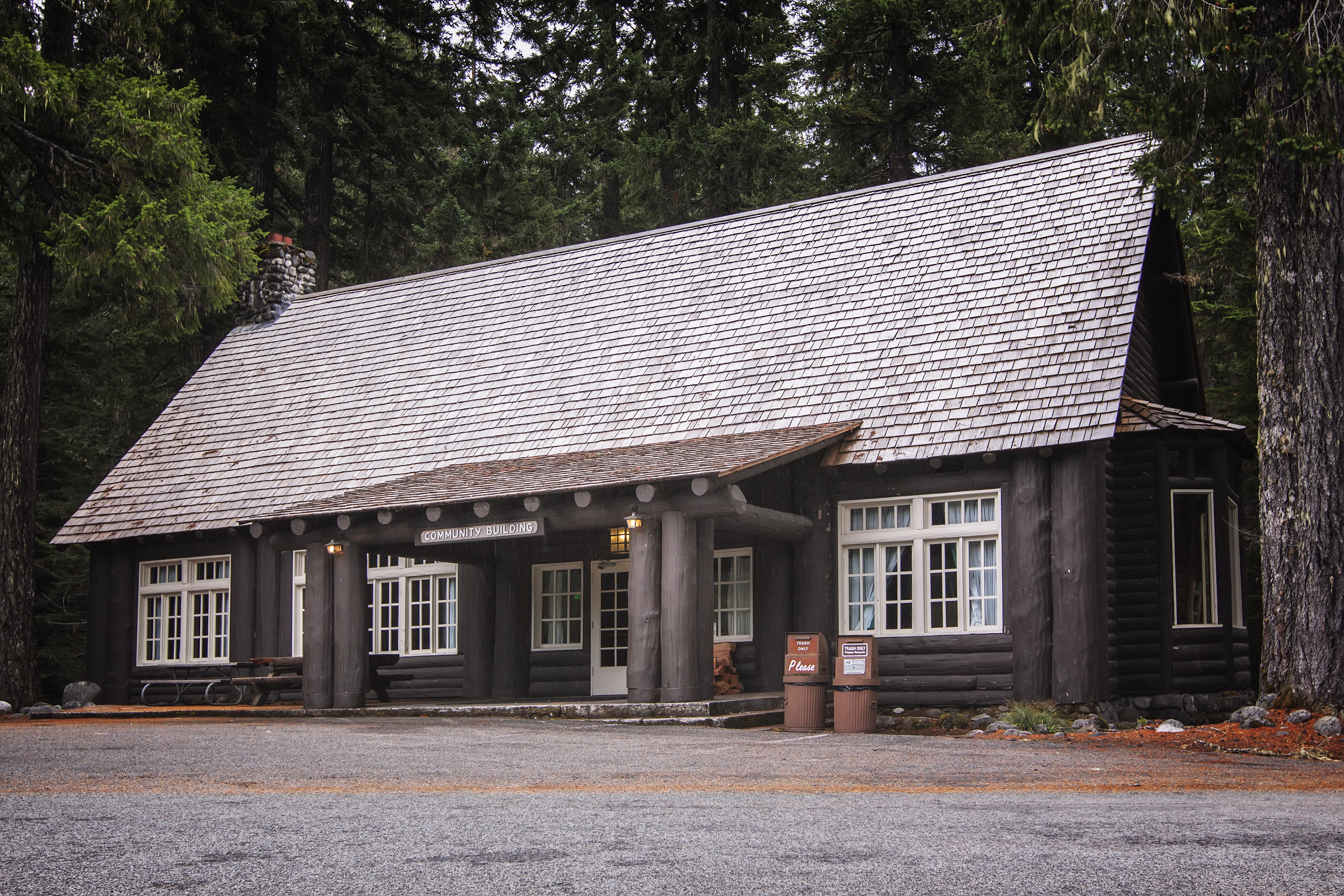
Longmire Community Building

The Community Building was the first to be built and set the tone for the area. The T-Shaped frame building houses a large community room measuring about 60 feet (18 m) by 30 feet (9.1 m), with a subsidiary wing housing toilets and staff quarters. A deep porch occupies one bay in front of the community room. Exterior walls are finished with log-slab veneer. The community room's interior features exposed scissor-truss log roof framing, with a large stone fireplace at one end. The masonry of the fireplace is distinctive, with roughly squared stone in the lower portion giving way to round glacial boulders. The other end of the room houses a small stage in a bay projecting from the end of the building. Original furnishings include light fixtures and log tables resembling those at the Paradise Inn. The living quarters were renovated in 1964 and retain little of their historic fabric. The interiors of the housing wing were excluded from the National Historic Landmark nomination. The lower level is used as a kitchen, with two apartments on the upper level.

== Service Station ==
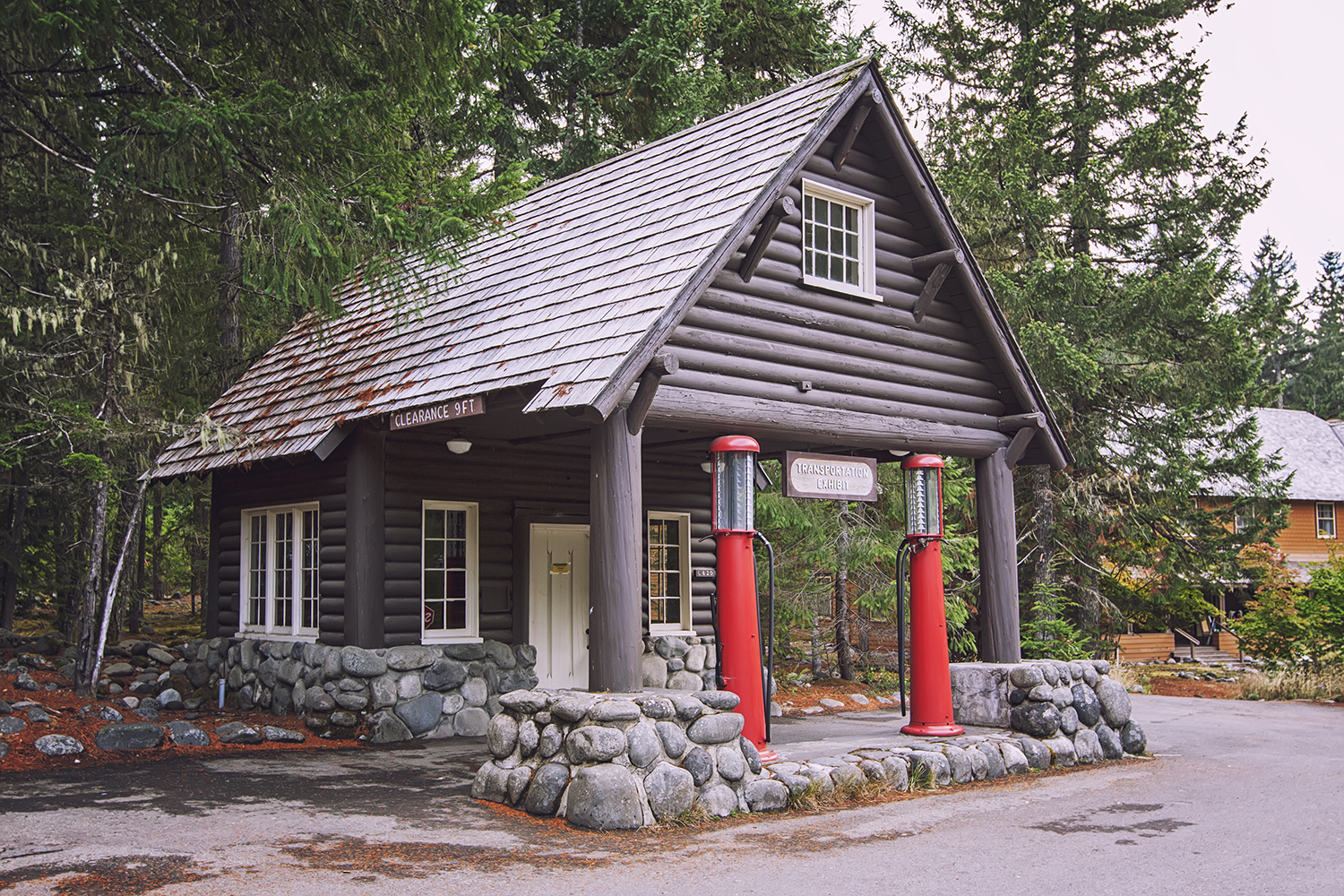
Longmire Service Station

The 1929 Service Station provided gasoline and basic services to park visitors. The front half of the building is a drive-through covered bay with supports on the gas island, with an office in the other half behind, the whole crowned by a steeply pitched attic. Stone-faced concrete extends from grade level to sill level. The frame wall above is clad with log slab siding, while the roof is clad with cedar shingles. A small apartment is housed in the attic, accessible by an exterior stairway.

The Longmire Buildings form a part of the Longmire Historic District, which is itself within the Mount Rainier National Park National Historic Landmark District, comprising the entire park.

The Administration Building and Service Station are close together near the road, while the Community Building is across the Nisqually River. The construction of all three was supervised by Ernest A. Davidson, a Park Service landscape architect assigned to Mount Rainier. Vint chose to feature the Community Building and the Administration Building in his 1938 Park and Recreation Structures publications, an influential series of three volumes devoted to rustic park structures that influenced state and national park design through the 1930s. The Service Station stands as an almost unique example of rustic architecture for that building type.

== See also ==
- National Register of Historic Places listings in Lewis County, Washington
- National Register of Historic Places listings in Pierce County, Washington
- National Register of Historic Places listings in Mount Rainier National Park
- List of National Historic Landmarks in Washington (state)
