= Ohanapecosh Comfort Stations =

NRHP-listed sites in Lewis County, Washington

- Ohanapecosh Comfort Station No. O-302
- U.S. National Register of Historic Places
- Washington State Heritage Register
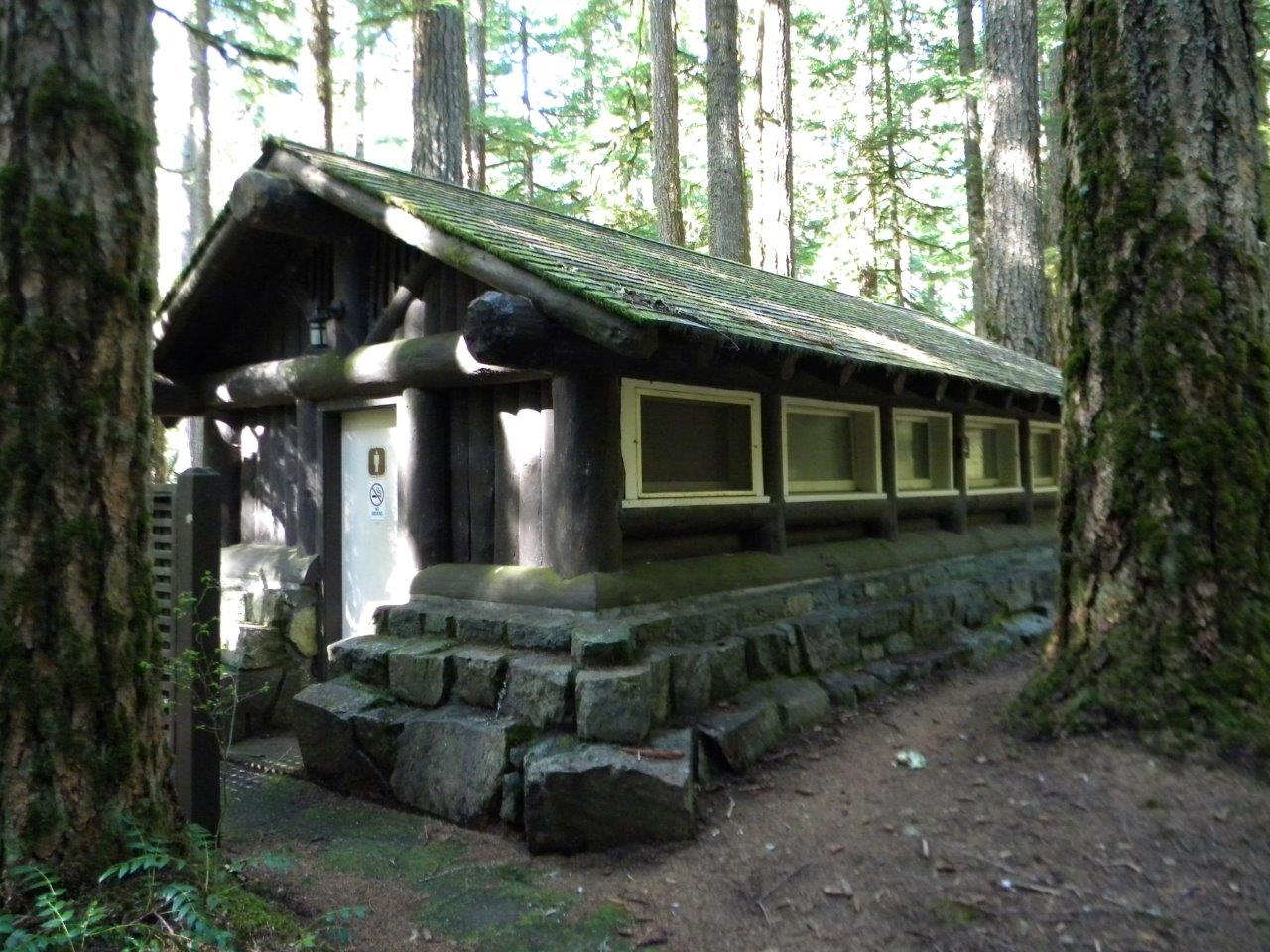
- Ohanapecosh Comfort Station No. O-302, 2015

- Location within Washington (state)
- Location: Ohanapecosh Campground, Washington
- Nearest city: Packwood, Washington
- Coordinates: 46°44′13″N 121°33′53″W
- Area: less than one acre
- Built: 1935
- Architect: Thomas Chalmers Vint
- Architectural style: National Park Service rustic
- Visitation: 65,000 to 80,000 (Note: The visitation number is based on the total number of visitors to the Ohanapecosh Campground.) (2013)
- Website: National Park Service - Ohanapecosh
- MPS: Mt. Rainier National Park MPS
- NRHP reference No.: 91000203 (Note: As of 2025, the Ohanapecosh Comfort Station No. 302 NRHP file has not been digitized. Please review the catalogued inventory form.)

Significant dates
- Added to NRHP: March 13, 1991
- Designated WSHR: March 13, 1991

- Ohanapecosh Comfort Station No. O-303
- U.S. National Register of Historic Places
- Washington State Heritage Register
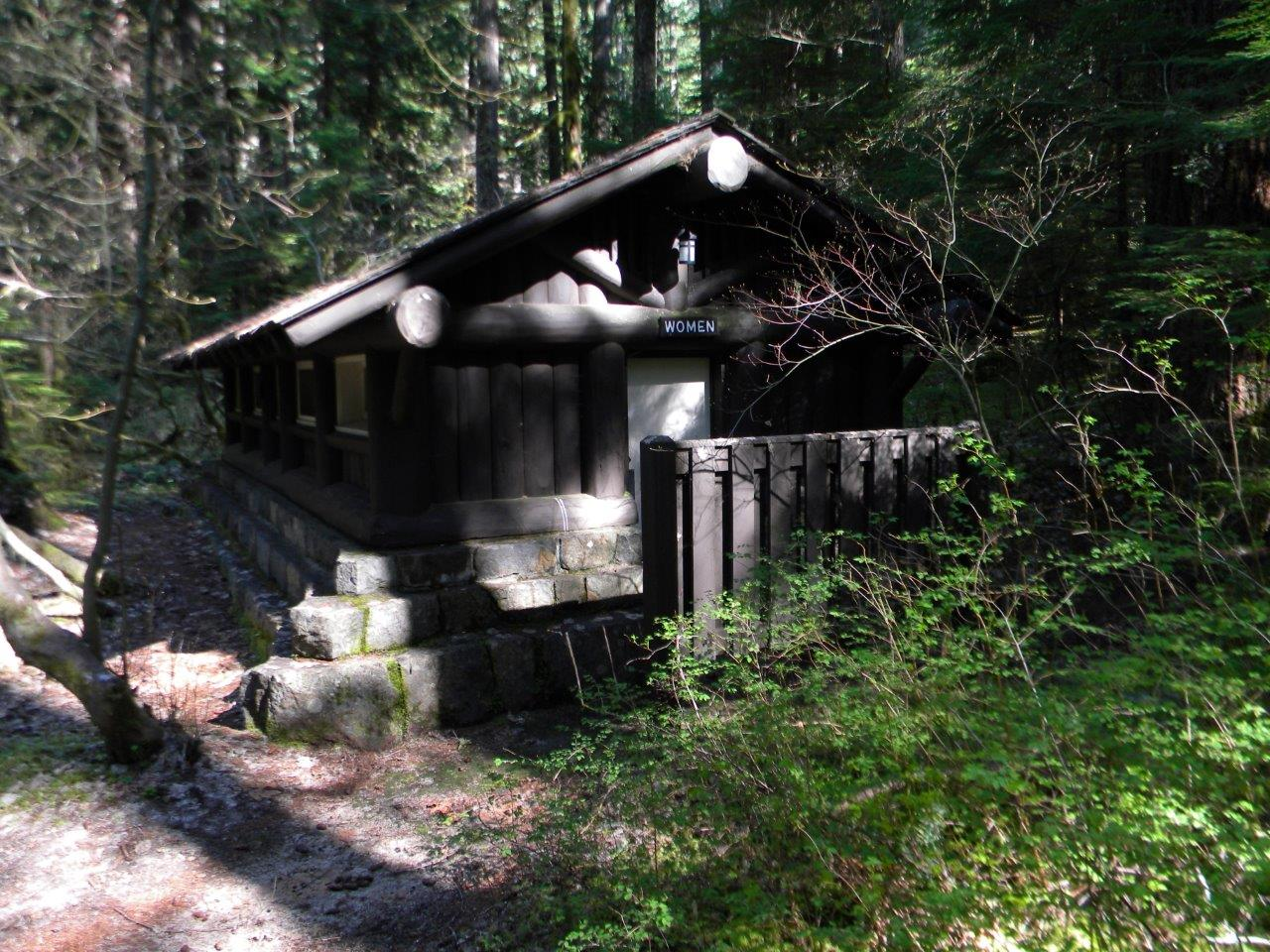
- Ohanapecosh Comfort Station No. O-303, 2015
- Coordinates: 46°44′10″N 121°34′01″W
- Area: less than one acre
- Built: 1935
- Architect: Thomas Chalmers Vint
- Architectural style: National Park Service rustic
- NRHP reference No.: 91000204 (Note: As of 2025, the Ohanapecosh Comfort Station No. 303 NRHP file has not been digitized. Please review the catalogued inventory form.)

Significant dates
- Added to NRHP: March 13, 1991
- Designated WSHR: March 13, 1991

The Ohanapecosh Comfort Stations are a pair of public restrooms located in Mt. Rainier National Park. The two structures were added to the National Register of Historic Places in 1991 and are designated as Ohanapecosh Comfort Station No. O-302 and Ohanapecosh Comfort Station No. O-303. The comfort stations are part of the Ohanapecosh Campground.

The stations were built in 1935 under a joint effort of the National Park Service and Civilian Conservation Corps, constructed on an existing lodge and campground area that was begun in the mid-1920s. The buildings follow the National Park Service rustic architectural style, with primary use of log beams and stone foundations.

The stations and campground are situated in old-growth forest near the Ohanapecosh River and recreational amenities include camping and a visitor center. Several trails are accessible at the grounds, and hikers can access the Pacific Crest Trail and the Wonderland Trail via the interconnected trail system.

The comfort stations and campground were closed due to a renovation project begun in 2025, and expected to reopen in 2026.

== Etymology ==
Ohanapecosh is a Cowlitz word translated as, "clear, blue water" and was once the name of Taidnapam village on the Cowlitz River. The word is also believed to mean, "standing at the edge".

A legend exists that the word was an exclamation of astonishment when an indigenous man first saw the blue waters of the region's hot springs. The meaning in the moment is translated as, "looking down on something wonderful".

== History ==
A public resort, known as the Ohanapecosh Lodge, was constructed at present-day Ohanapecosh Campground around 1924. The lodge expanded to become the Bridge Clinic after President Herbert Hoover signed a bill that extended Mt. Rainer's park boundary in 1931. The National Park Service (NPS), in response to increased tourism, cooperated with the Civilian Conservation Corps to construct the comfort stations in the 1930s. The CCC camp was an integrated group before segregation was reordered in 1935. The clinic was demolished after the NPS purchased the resort in 1962. Newer buildings constructed during the Ohanapecosh Campground's expansion in the 1950's copied the rustic architectural style of the comfort stations.

Federal budget sequestration closed the campground's visitor center for the summer 2013 season, and overnight camping access was shortened by two weeks. Annual number of visitors in 2013 were recorded between 65,000 and 80,000 people.

A 2025 renovation of the campground, known as the Ohanapecosh Campground Rehabilitation Project, includes the comfort stations and the campground's water system. The effort, part of larger initiative that includes improvements to Washington State Route 123 and other travel concerns, was funded by the Bipartisan Infrastructure Law and a Legacy Restoration Fund under the Great American Outdoors Act. The campground and comfort stations are planned to be closed until 2026.

== Ohanapecosh Comfort Station No. O-302 ==
Ohanapecosh Comfort Station No. O-302 was built in 1935. Following a 1920s standard design plan used by the western division of the National Park Service (NPS), the credited architect is Thomas Chalmers Vint. The unaltered structure is a one-story log and masonry building. Although the NPS is credited with the $2,000 construction, CCC workers are considered the most likely source of labor in the No. 302 build.

The footprint is rectangular and the structure contains a medium-pitched gable roof (Note: The roof of both comfort stations were originally cedar shake and had been replaced by the time of their NRHP nomination.) over log rafters which protrude at the ridge and under the projecting eaves; logs are also used as support posts resting on a stone foundation. The foundation is a tiered, step stone configuration. The upper half of the station's façade is built of log slabs, the lower half is made of stone.

Narrow windows, inset into the log sheathing, line both long sides of the station. Entrances are protected by a lattice screen which replaced an original log beam screen. The entryways, originally wooden, were replaced with masonite doors. The interior has tongue-and-groove walls, with a finished ceiling and a concrete floor.

== Ohanapecosh Comfort Station No. O-303 ==
Ohanapecosh Comfort Station No. O-303 is nearly similar in appearance, engineering, and history to No. O-302. Also built in 1935, it is an unaltered, one-story log and masonry structure with a rectangular footprint and a medium-pitched gable roof. The roof sheathing of cedar shake was replaced with cedar shingles. Log beams are used as support elements throughout the building. The foundation is a three-step, stone configuration with log slab walls installed on top of the support footing.

The interior, windows, and doors are as well similar; the wooden door was replaced approximately in 1960. The entrance screen, comparable to No.O-302, was reworked into a lattice barrier noted in the 1991 NRHP nomination form.

== Geography ==
The comfort stations are located in Ohanapecosh Campground at Mt. Rainier National Park within the borders of Lewis County. The area is located near the Ohanapecosh Hot Springs and is considered to be approximately 12 miles (19 km) north of Packwood, Washington. Comfort Station No. O-302 is located south of the Ohanapecosh River near the campground's visitor center. The river is considered the only clear, glacier-fed waterway in the park.

The campground is situated in an area known as the Grove of the Patriarchs, an old-growth forested setting of trees up to 1,000 years old. Species in the grove and the surrounding area include Douglas fir, western hemlock, and red cedar. Located at the site is a visitor center and exhibits on the ecology and geology of the area.

== Recreation ==
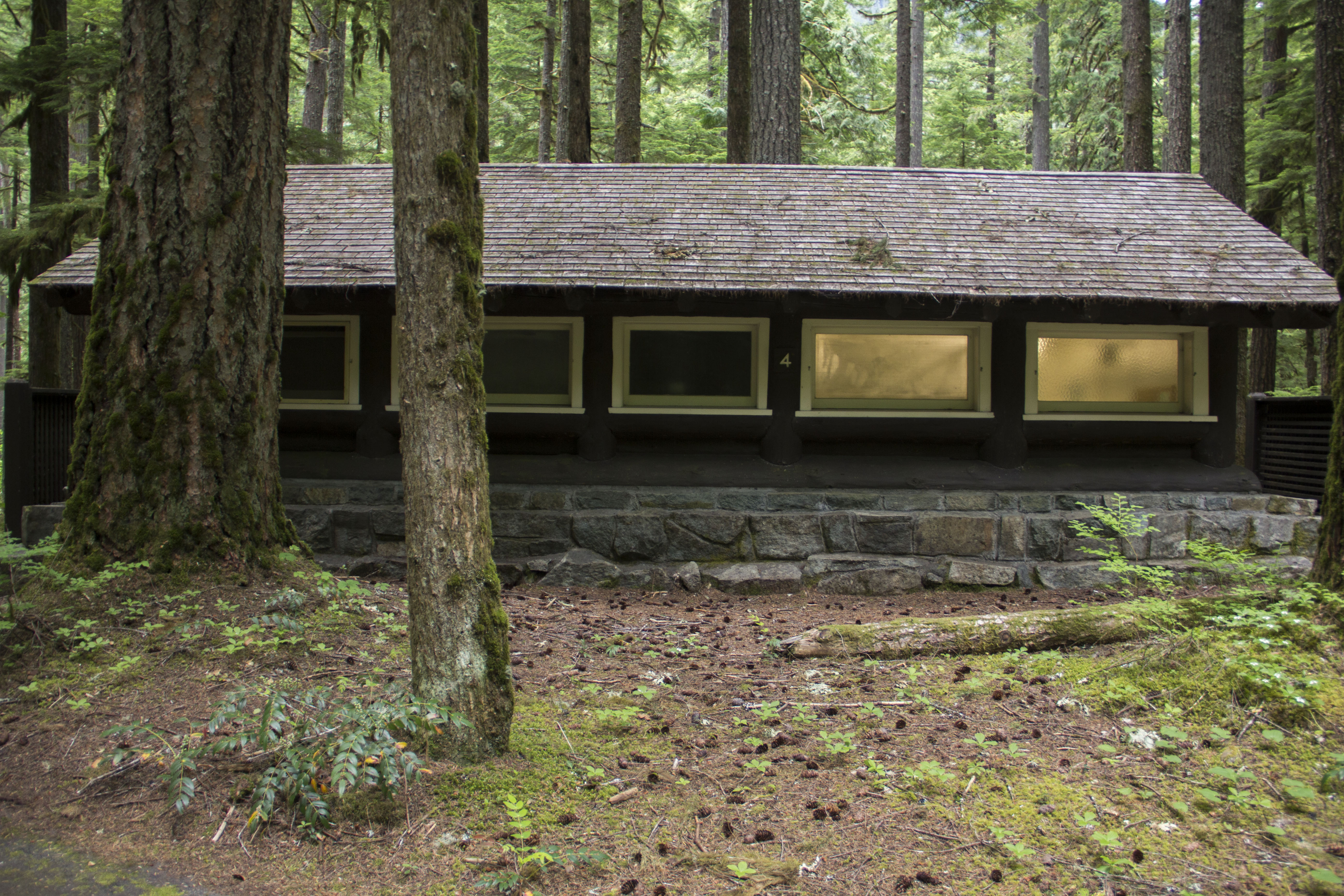
Ohanapecosh Comfort Station No. O-302, side view, 2014

The campground's visitor center is near several trailheads. A 1.5-mile (2.4 km) trail leads to the Grove of the Patriarchs and a smaller, 0.5-mile (0.80 km) forested nature trail leads to natural, shallow hot springs. Visitors can access a 3-mile (4.8 km) path to Silver Falls and the 93-mile (150 km) Wonderland Trail. The Pacific Crest Trail passes through the campground.

== Significance ==
Both comfort stations were added to the National Register of Historic Places on March 13, 1991. The buildings were noted for their National Park Service rustic architectural style and connections to Mt. Rainier National Park. The structural elements were considered to be "harmonized" with the natural, forested setting of the area.

The comfort stations were also listed with the Washington State Heritage Register on the same date.
