= Experiments in Fluids =

- Discipline: Engineering
- Language: English
- Edited by: Christian J. Kähler, E.K. Longmire, J. Westerweel

Publication details
- History: 1983-present
- Publisher: Springer (Germany)
- Frequency: Monthly
- Impact factor: 2.7 (2025)

Standard abbreviations
- ISO 4: Exp. Fluids

Indexing
- ISSN: 1432-1114

Links
- Journal homepage

Experiments in Fluids is a scientific, peer-reviewed scientific journal published monthly by Springer Science+Business Media. The journal presents contributions that employ existing experimental techniques to gain an understanding of the underlying flow physics in specific areas. These areas include turbulence, aerodynamics, hydrodynamics, convective heat transfer, combustion, turbomachinery, multi-phase flows, and chemical, biological and geological flows. In addition, papers report on investigations combining experimental and analytical/numerical approaches. The journal also publishes letters and review articles.

== Impact factor ==
Experiments in Fluids had a 2025 impact factor of 2.7.

== Editors ==
The editors of the journal are Christian J. Kähler (Universität der Bundeswehr, München), E. K. Longmire (University of Minnesota, USA), and J. Westerweel (Laboratory for Aero & Hydrodynamics, Delft University of Technology, Netherlands).

The founding editors are J. H. Whitelaw (Imperial College, United Kingdom) and W. Merzkirch (University of Essen, Germany). Jim Whitelaw served the journal from 1982 until 1999; Wolfgang Merzkirch was with the journal from 1982 until 2002.
