= Ohanapecosh Glacier =

Glacier in the United States

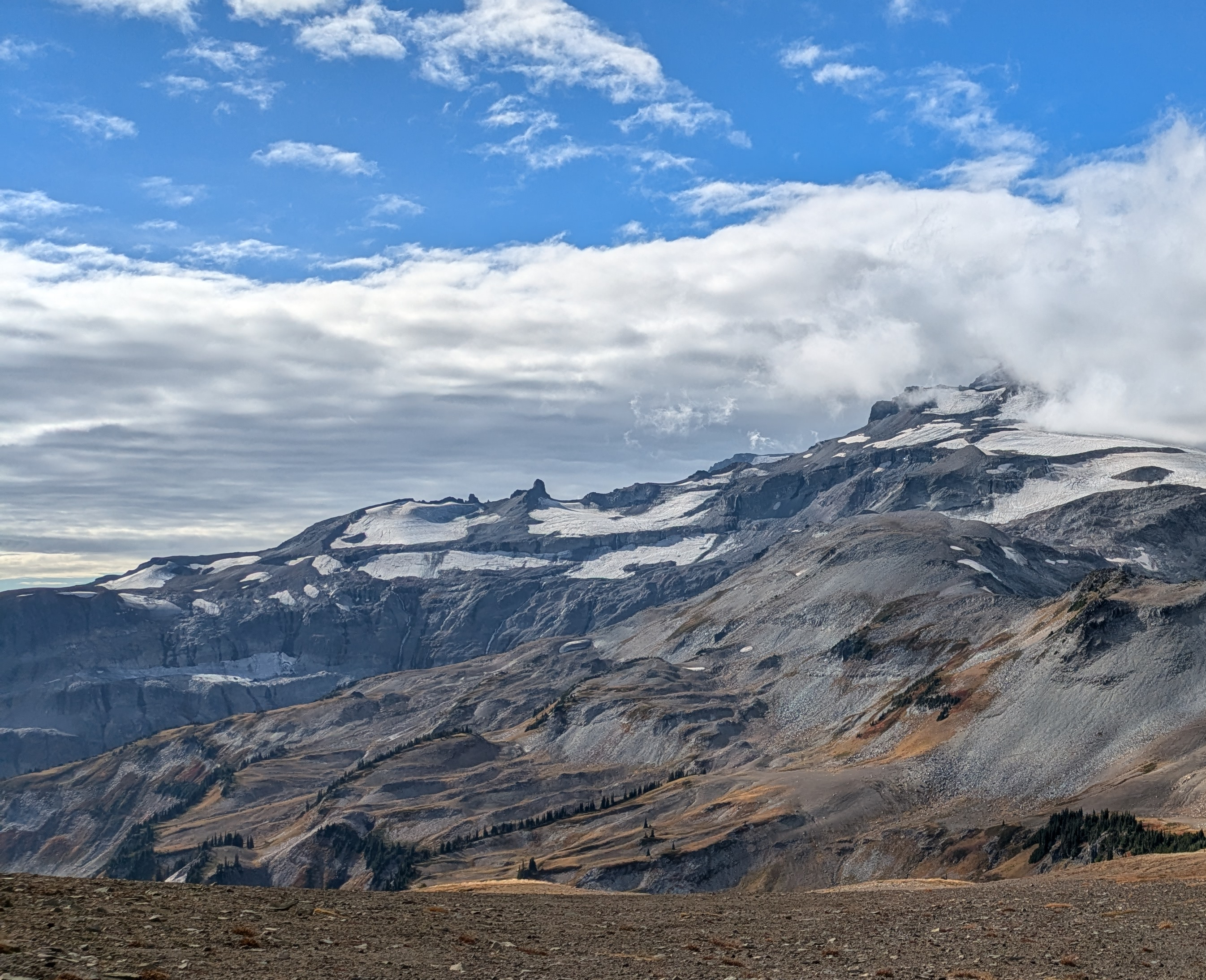
- View SSW from Banshee Peak—October 2024
- Interactive map of Ohanapecosh Glacier
- Type: Mountain glacier
- Location: Mount Rainier, Pierce County, Washington, USA
- Coordinates: 46°50′09″N 121°40′12″W
- Area: 0.6 square miles (1.6 km^{2}), 1983

The Ohanapecosh Glacier is small glacier located on Mount Rainier's southeastern flanks in Washington, to the east of the Whitman Crest. It covers 0.6 square miles (1.6 km^{2}) and contains 1.3 billion ft^{3} (37 million m^{3}) of ice. The glacier consists of several lobes of ice interconnected by thin snowfields. Most of the glacier lies at an elevation of 8,300 feet (2,500 m) to 7,400 feet (2,300 m), near the Whitman and the Fryingpan Glacier. Since this ice lobe ends on a cliff, it contributes ice to the lower portions of the Ohanapecosh Glacier. The lower sections of this glacier end on cliffs and a small valley at about 6,100 ft (1,900 m) in elevation. Meltwater from the glacier drains into the Ohanapecosh River and the Muddy Fork Cowlitz River, which merge downstream about four miles (6 km) outside of Mount Rainier National Park into the Cowlitz River.

== See also ==
- List of glaciers
