= Ellen Longmire =

American applied physicist and mechanical engineer

Ellen Kathryn Longmire is an American applied physicist and mechanical engineer known for her research in experimental fluid dynamics and turbulence. She is a professor of aerospace engineering and mechanics at the University of Minnesota, where she is also Associate Dean for Academic Affairs in the College of Science & Engineering,, the former chair of the American Physical Society Division of Fluid Dynamics, and one of three editors-in-chief of the journal Experiments in Fluids.

== Education and career ==
Longmire majored in physics at Princeton University, graduating in 1982. After a year at the Technical University of Braunschweig, and work in industry at Honeywell, Hauni-Werke Koerber, and Science Applications International, she went to Stanford University for graduate study in mechanical engineering, earning a master's degree in 1985 and completing a Ph.D. in 1990.

She became an assistant professor in the University of Minnesota Department of Aerospace Engineering and Mechanics in 1990, and was named McKnight Land-Grant Assistant Professor in 1994. She was promoted to a full professorship in 2003, and associate dean in 2018.

She chaired the American Physical Society Division of Fluid Dynamics in 2016.

== Recognition ==
Longmire was named a Fellow of the American Physical Society (APS) in 2006, after a nomination by the APS Division of Fluid Dynamics, "for innovative experiments in turbulent and particle-laden flows, and the development of new and improved flow diagnostic techniques".
