= Longmire, Washington =

- Longmire Historic District
- U.S. National Register of Historic Places
- U.S. Historic district
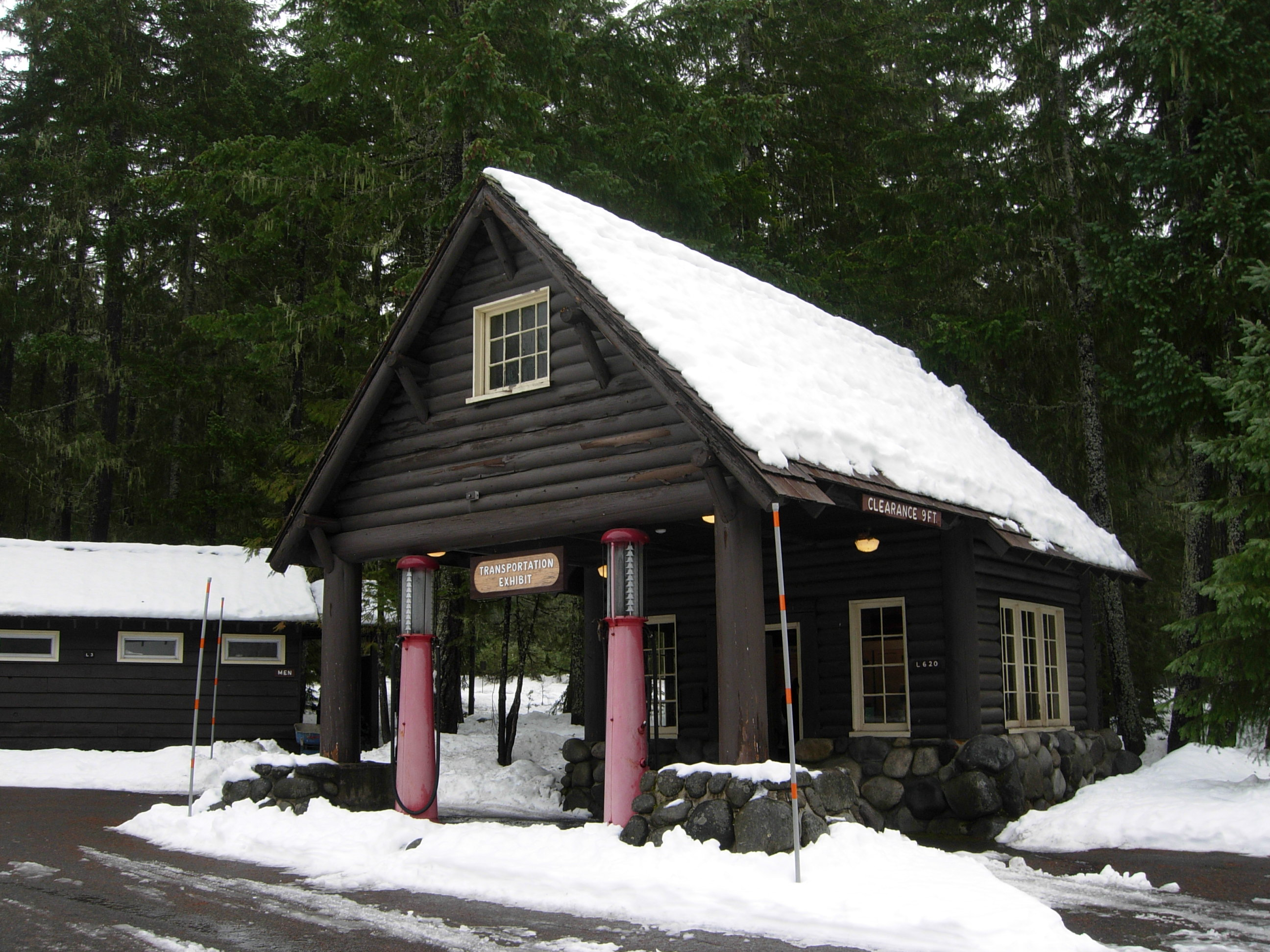

- Location within Washington (state)
- Location: Mt. Rainier National Park, Longmire, Washington
- Coordinates: 46°44′58″N 121°48′33″W
- Area: 85 acres (34 ha)
- Architectural style: Rustic style
- MPS: Mt. Rainier National Park MPS
- NRHP reference No.: 91000173
- Added to NRHP: March 13, 1991

Longmire, which is effectively encompassed by the Longmire Historic District, is a visitor services center in Washington State's Mount Rainier National Park, located 6.5 miles (10.5 km) east of the Nisqually Entrance. The area is in the Nisqually River valley at an elevation of 2,761 feet (842 m) between The Ramparts Ridge and the Tatoosh Range. Longmire is surrounded by old-growth Douglas fir, western red cedar and western hemlock.

== Historic District ==
The Longmire Historic District comprises the former headquarters district of the park and its chief developed area. The district includes 58 contributing buildings and structures, including four structures individually listed on the National Register of Historic Places. It is home to the largest concentration of National Park Service Rustic–style structures in the park, and one of the most notable groups of such structures in any U.S. national park. The district lies on either side of the Paradise-Nisqually Road, with the Longmire Meadows area on the north side and the park concession and administration facilities on the south side of the road.

Individually listed structures on the National Register include the Longmire Buildings, a National Historic Landmark comprising the park's former headquarters, the Longmire Cabin, and three comfort stations, L-302, L-303 and L-305. (Note: A discrepancy exists over the numerical designation of Longmire Campground Comfort Station No. L-305. Listed as such on the National Historic Landmark nomination form for Mt. Rainier National Park and the restroom's National Register of Historic Places inventory form, an attached NRHP Continuation Sheet lists the structure as L-304.) The district was placed on the National Register of Historic Places on March 13, 1991. Longmire is also the location of Mount Rainier's National Park Inn, the Longmire Museum. These buildings are constructed in rustic style. The National Park Inn is the only accommodation in the park open all year round. The Longmire Historic District is in turn part of the Mount Rainier National Historic Landmark District, which encompasses the entire park and which recognizes the park's inventory of Park Service-designed rustic architecture.

Longmire is the second most popular destination for visitors to Mount Rainier National Park after Paradise. Of the more than 1.3 million people who visited the park in 2000, 38% visited Longmire. The Cougar Rock Campground is about 2 miles (3 km) north east of Longmire. Longmire is one of the starting points of the Wonderland Trail.

== Nisqually Suspension Bridge ==
Located within the boundaries of the Longmire Historic District is the Nisqually Suspension Bridge, considered one of the oldest such spans in the National Park System. The historic landmark was originally built for foot traffic in 1911 and rebuilt to accommodate automobiles in 1924. The bridge was rebuilt twice, in 1952 and 2005. Due to the bridge's age and subsequent state, the overpass was limited to vehicles under 6,000 pounds (2,700 kg) in August 2024.

The Nisqually Suspension Bridge is the last remaining timber-framed trestle span of its type designed by the National Park System.

== History ==
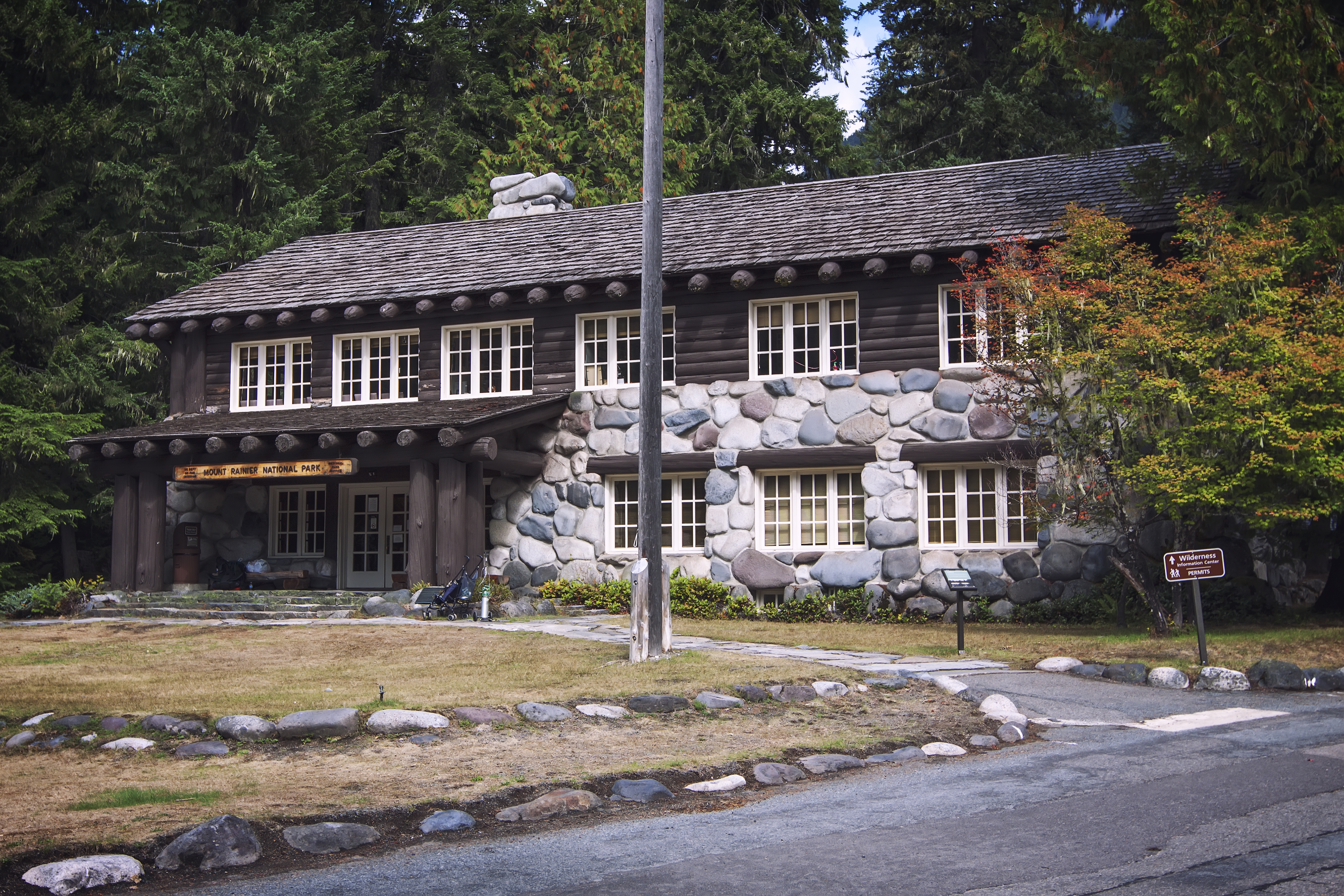
Mount Rainier Administrative Building, Longmire

On August 16, 1883, George Bayley, Philemon Van Trump and James Longmire made the third successful ascent of Mt. Rainier. During their return trip, Longmire discovered several mineral hot springs just north of Bear Prairie. He returned to the area later that fall and laid claim to the tract, which would become known as Longmire Springs. During the following year, he blazed a crude path, which branched off the Yelm-Bear Prairie Road that he and William Packwood blazed in 1861, to Longmire Springs. This would become the second trail to track through the future national park.

In 1884 James Longmire built a trail from Succotash Valley in Ashford 13 miles (21 km) to the hot springs where he built cabins in the area which now bears his name. John Muir described staying there on the way to his ascent of Mount Rainier in 1888. The oldest surviving structure in the National Park is a cabin built by Longmire's son Elcaine Longmire at the springs in 1888. It is located north of the road in the area now called Longmire Meadows.

From 1899 to 1904 approximately 500 people a year visited Longmire Springs in the summer months. They reached the area by train to Ashford and then on Longmire's wagon trail. They enjoyed the mineral springs and the view of Mount Rainier. They could also hike to Paradise or Indian Henry's Hunting Grounds, both about 6 miles (10 km) from Longmire Springs on trails built by the Longmire family.

In 1890, Longmire built a five-room hotel, which was later expanded. By 1906, the Longmires' hotel with assorted tents and cabins totaled 30 rooms. In that year, the Tacoma and Eastern Railroad built the original National Park Inn at Longmire, a three-story building with accommodation for 60 guests. Having a competitor establish in the Longmire area soured relations between the National Park and the Longmire family. There followed some legal disputes between the Longmires and park officials including the opening of a saloon by Robert Longmire (James' son) and its subsequent closure by Acting Superintendent Grenville F. Allen who thought it a "public nuisance".

Constructed in an early rustic style, a Hiker's Center was built in 1911 by the Tacoma and Eastern Railroad. It is now the Longmire general store.

The Longmires wearied of park pressures to improve their facilities, and after Elcaine's death in 1915, they leased their property to the newly formed Longmire Springs Hotel Company in 1916. The new operators promptly built an additional hotel structure along with 16 wood-frame cabins. Although the property was cleaned up and improved, operating as "The New Longmire Springs Hotel", it still did not meet the quality level of the National Park Inn across the road.

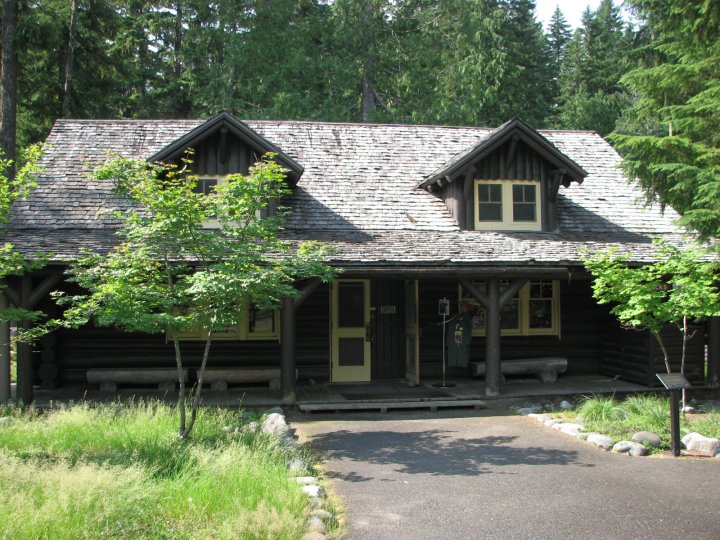
Hiker's Center, built in 1911 in National Park Service Rustic style, is now a gift shop and general store.

Steven T. Mather, the first director of the National Park Service developed a policy which favored regulated monopolies over competing concessioners in the National Parks. Over a number of years the National Park Service worked to make the Rainier National Park Company the only concessionaire in the park. This was completed in 1919 when the Rainier National Park Company purchased the Longmire family buildings and a 20-year lease on the Longmire's private inholding for $12,000 in a three-way deal which included J.B. Ternes and E.C. Cornell, owners of the Longmire Springs Hotel Company. They eventually bought the Longmire family property, after the lease expired in 1939.

Rainier National Park Company moved the 1916 Longmire Springs Hotel structure next to the National Park Inn in 1920. Smaller than the existing inn, it became known as the National Park Inn Annex. A 2 1/2-story building with plain exteriors, it contained seventeen guest rooms. The Rainier National Park Company also demolished the original 1890 Longmire Springs Hotel and utility buildings in the area to "improve the appearance" of the area.

Once the road to Paradise and the Paradise Inn opened, visitors to the park preferred to stay at Paradise, making the Longmire hotel and annex unprofitable. The Rainier National Park Company intended to promote the area by advertising the medicinal qualities of the spring water. However, the Bureau of Chemistry's Hygienic Lab in Washington, D.C. tested the waters and concluded that they didn't have any medicinal value. The National Park Service prohibited the Rainier National Park Company from making false claims about the waters. The springs were never redeveloped.

In the 1910s, as the number of visitors to the park increased, the Park Service moved the administration center from the Nisqually area to Longmire. The community kitchen was built in 1916 and is now the library. The park's first administration building was built in 1916 and now houses the Longmire Museum and Visitors Center.

In 1927, the Landscape Engineering Division of the National Park Service San Francisco office created a development plan to give "a sense of order" to the buildings the government and concessionaires had built in the Longmire Plaza area south of the road. Three particularly significant buildings came about as a result of this plan, each of which demonstrated the National Park Service efforts to construct structures "that harmonized with the rugged slopes of Mount Rainier". The Community Building (1927) is a good example of early National Park Service Rustic style. The use of pairs of columns rather than the notched corner technique shows a particular skill in using natural minerals. The Administration Building (1928) is said to be the most architecturally significant of the buildings from this period. Features such as the heavy masonry first floor and timber second story were influenced by the 1924 administration building at Yosemite. Careful selection of local boulders was important in achieving a building that matches the surrounding landscape. The Service Station, built in 1929, is the last of these three buildings. It was designed to be unobtrusive in its natural setting.

The original National Park Inn burned to the ground in 1926, leaving only the National Park Inn Annex, now the National Park Inn. This building was remodeled in 1936 and was essentially rebuilt again in 1990.

The administrative center was moved outside the park to Tahoma Woods near the Nisqually entrance in 1977 as a result of the 1972 master plan, which restrained new development within the park.

In 1987, the Longmire Buildings were declared a National Historic Landmark.

== 2006 flooding ==
Longmire, along with Paradise, were among the most badly affected areas in the November 6, 2006 Pineapple Express rainstorm when 18 inches (457 mm) of rain fell in a 36-hour period, causing extensive flood damage and road closures. State Route 706 (the Nisqually entrance to Paradise road) which serves Longmire was closed due to flood damage until May 5, 2007.

== Climate ==
Longmire experiences warm, dry summers and cold, snowy winters. According to the Köppen climate classification system, Longmire has a Mediterranean-influenced warm-summer humid continental climate (Dsb).

Climate data for Longmire Rainier NPS, Washington, 1991–2020 normals, extremes 1909–present
Month	Jan	Feb	Mar	Apr	May	Jun	Jul	Aug	Sep	Oct	Nov	Dec	Year
Record high °F (°C)	63 (17)	69 (21)	73 (23)	87 (31)	95 (35)	105 (41)	105 (41)	101 (38)	101 (38)	88 (31)	72 (22)	60 (16)	105 (41)
Mean maximum °F (°C)	46.3 (7.9)	50.4 (10.2)	60.6 (15.9)	70.3 (21.3)	81.5 (27.5)	86.4 (30.2)	91.8 (33.2)	91.3 (32.9)	87.4 (30.8)	72.7 (22.6)	54.6 (12.6)	45.7 (7.6)	94.7 (34.8)
Mean daily maximum °F (°C)	37.2 (2.9)	40.2 (4.6)	44.6 (7.0)	50.5 (10.3)	59.9 (15.5)	65.9 (18.8)	75.3 (24.1)	75.6 (24.2)	68.6 (20.3)	54.5 (12.5)	42.5 (5.8)	36.4 (2.4)	54.3 (12.4)
Daily mean °F (°C)	31.6 (−0.2)	33.0 (0.6)	36.2 (2.3)	40.6 (4.8)	48.4 (9.1)	53.7 (12.1)	60.8 (16.0)	60.9 (16.1)	55.1 (12.8)	44.8 (7.1)	35.9 (2.2)	30.8 (−0.7)	44.3 (6.9)
Mean daily minimum °F (°C)	25.9 (−3.4)	25.9 (−3.4)	27.7 (−2.4)	30.8 (−0.7)	36.8 (2.7)	41.5 (5.3)	46.3 (7.9)	46.1 (7.8)	41.6 (5.3)	35.2 (1.8)	29.3 (−1.5)	25.1 (−3.8)	34.4 (1.3)
Mean minimum °F (°C)	15.9 (−8.9)	16.3 (−8.7)	20.4 (−6.4)	24.9 (−3.9)	29.2 (−1.6)	35.3 (1.8)	40.2 (4.6)	39.4 (4.1)	34.0 (1.1)	25.6 (−3.6)	20.3 (−6.5)	15.0 (−9.4)	9.6 (−12.4)
Record low °F (°C)	−9 (−23)	−5 (−21)	−1 (−18)	12 (−11)	21 (−6)	27 (−3)	32 (0)	33 (1)	24 (−4)	15 (−9)	3 (−16)	−6 (−21)	−9 (−23)
Average precipitation inches (mm)	11.45 (291)	8.60 (218)	7.55 (192)	5.93 (151)	4.75 (121)	3.70 (94)	1.22 (31)	1.49 (38)	3.50 (89)	9.00 (229)	12.96 (329)	12.42 (315)	82.57 (2,098)
Average snowfall inches (cm)	32.7 (83)	19.2 (49)	25.4 (65)	9.7 (25)	2.1 (5.3)	0.1 (0.25)	0.0 (0.0)	0.0 (0.0)	0.0 (0.0)	0.9 (2.3)	18.6 (47)	34.3 (87)	143.0 (363)
Average extreme snow depth inches (cm)	27.5 (70)	27.8 (71)	28.0 (71)	16.6 (42)	4.5 (11)	0.1 (0.25)	0.0 (0.0)	0.0 (0.0)	0.0 (0.0)	0.6 (1.5)	9.0 (23)	19.5 (50)	37.5 (95)
Average precipitation days (≥ 0.01 in)	20.8	17.3	20.2	18.5	16.7	14.3	6.8	6.5	9.9	17.0	20.1	20.2	188.3
Average snowy days (≥ 0.1 in)	8.5	8.2	8.7	4.1	1.0	0.0	0.0	0.0	0.0	0.5	5.5	10.5	47.0
Source: NOAA

== See also ==
- Narada Falls Comfort Station
- Ohanapecosh Comfort Stations
