= Ernest A. Davidson =

American architect

Ernest A. Davidson was an American architect.

Among his works are two National Park Service building complexes at Mount Rainier National Park, both designated National Historic Landmarks:

- Longmire Buildings
- Yakima Park Stockade Group

In 1932, Ernest A. Davidson pondered the result of development in Mt. Rainier's Yakima Park, noting it could be classed as a failure "since the area is far less attractive" than before construction, or it might be considered a great success "since the general appearance and result is far superior to those other developments with which comparison may be made, and 'just grew' like topsy".
