= Packwood, Washington =

Community in Eastern Lewis County, Washington

- Census-designated place
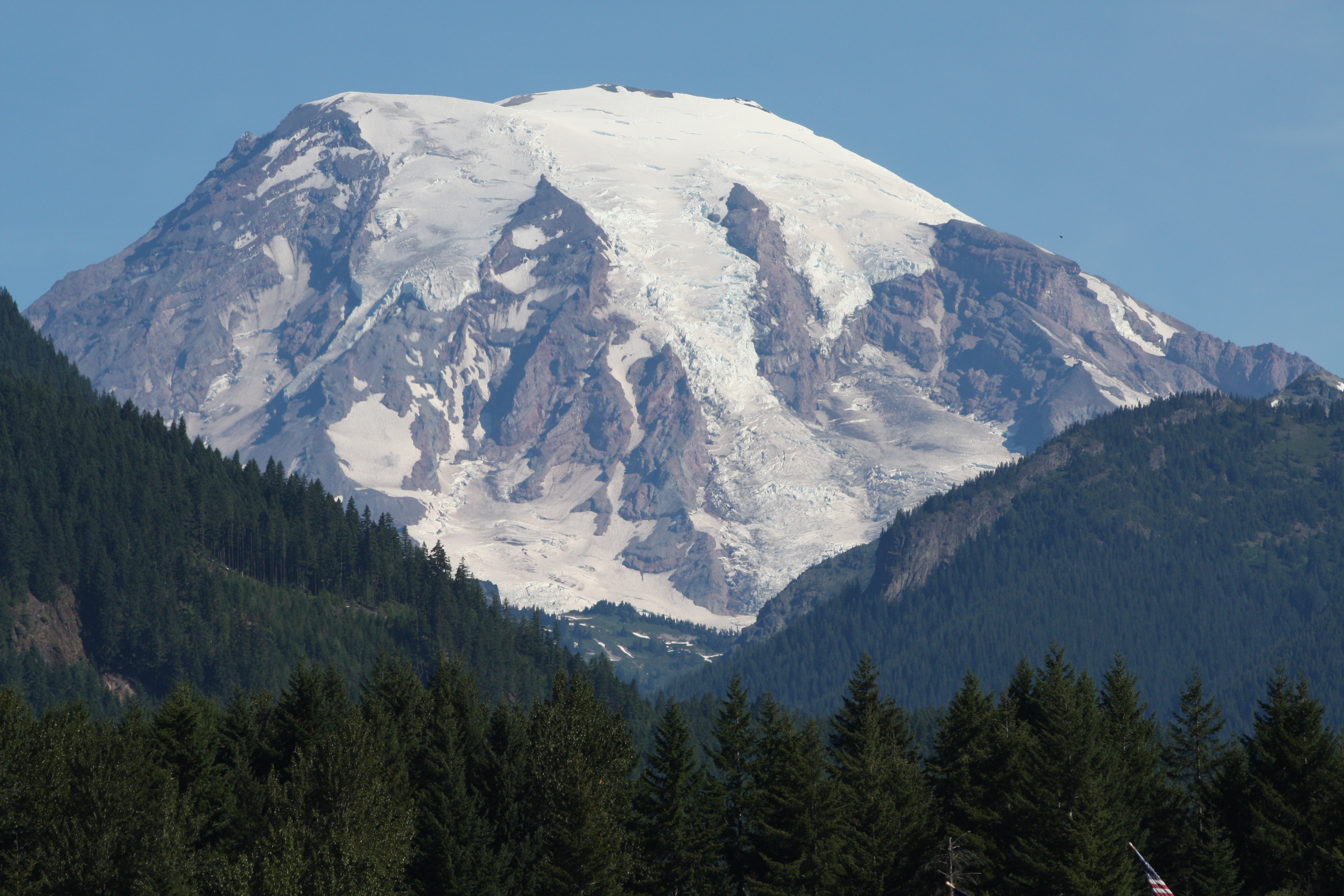
- From Packwood, Mount Rainier and Butter Creek Canyon dominate the view to the north.

- Location of Packwood in Lewis County, WA
- Coordinates: 46°36′31″N 121°40′13″W
- Country: United States
- State: Washington
- County: Lewis

Area
  - Total: 1.00 sq mi (2.58 km^{2})
  - Land: 1.00 sq mi (2.58 km^{2})
  - Water: 0 sq mi (0.0 km^{2})
- Elevation: 1,053 ft (321 m)

Population (2020)
  - Total: 319
  - Density: 343/sq mi (132.4/km^{2})
- Time zone: UTC−8 (PST)
  - Summer (DST): UTC−7 (PDT)
- ZIP Code: 98361
- Area code(s): 360, 564
- GNIS feature ID: 2586744
- FIPS code: 53-52600

Packwood is an unincorporated community and census-designated place (CDP) located in easternmost Lewis County, Washington, in the United States. As of the 2020 census, the CDP had a population of 319, while the town and surrounding Packwood community (east of Cora Bridge) had a total population of 1,073.

== Etymology ==
Packwood was originally established as Sulphur Springs. Shortly thereafter, it was renamed to Lewis with a post office established under the name by 1890,. The new name was in honor of Meriwether Lewis. The community was finally renamed to Packwood, in honor of William Packwood, due to the US Postal Service confusing the town with Fort Lewis.

== History ==
Before the Packwood community began, a large village of the Upper Cowlitz people existed at the present-day site of the town; tribal members near Kiona Creek were known as the ceq'klama.

The name "Packwood", used for the town, a mountain pass, and a lake, honors William Packwood, a Virginian pioneer and explorer of Oregon and Washington. Packwood and James Longmire were tasked by the Washington Territorial Legislature to chart a low pass over the Cascade Range, this necessitated by the deaths of several delegates in their journey to the first legislative session. As a mark of their successes in this venture, the charted pass – called the Packwood Saddle – is still unused by any road, trail, or other conveyance to pass between the east and west sides of the Cascades. Packwood is home to the historic Packwood Ranger Station located off of US-12.

=== Flooding ===
Packwood suffered severe flooding during an excessive rain and snowmelt event in December 1977. Eight homes were washed away and evacuations were necessary. Several bridges were closed after either washouts or structural damage, cutting off Packwood. The Johnson Creek Bridge, located on the main arterial of White Pass Scenic Byway, collapsed.

The community was inundated again during a November 2006 flood necessitating evacuations of hundreds of people from the High Valley area after a dike broke. Washed out homes were carried away by the Cowlitz River, which was recorded as exceeding 10 feet (3.0 m); the powerful flood changed the course of the river.

The Cowlitz crested twice during the 2025 Pacific Northwest floods. The river on December 9 reached 12 feet (3.7 m), considered just under major flood stage; it peaked the following day at 13.3 feet (4.1 m). People were evacuated along the river in the Packwood area; approximately 60 or more people were rescued in part by efforts of Packwood's county fire district. The bank of the river was rebuilt beginning the following week in the High Valley neighborhood after severe erosion threatened homes in the area.

The record peak of the Cowlitz River in Packwood is recorded at 14.6 feet (4.5 m).

== Geography ==
Packwood is located at the intersection of US Highway 12 and Gifford Pinchot National Forest Road 52 (Skate Creek Road). It is located between Mount Rainier National Park to the north and Mt. St. Helens National Volcanic Monument to the south. The Tatoosh Wilderness, Goat Rocks Wilderness, and William O. Douglas Wilderness are to the north, southeast, and northeast respectively, with the Gifford Pinchot National Forest as a buffer in all directions. Packwood is located in the upper Cowlitz River valley, just downstream of the confluence of the Muddy and Clear forks of the Cowlitz. The White Pass Ski Area and crest of the Cascade Range demark the eastern edge of the Packwood area, the town of Randle the west, and large expanses of forest, wilderness, and parkland the north and south.

According to the U.S. Census Bureau, the Packwood CDP has an area of 1.0 square mile (2.6 km^{2}), all of it recorded as land. The larger Packwood area, including the residential communities of Goat Rocks, High Valley Park, Packwood Heights, Skate Creek Terrace, Skyline, and Timberline Village, has 1,073 full-time residents.

=== Climate ===
According to the Köppen Climate Classification system, Packwood has a warm-summer Mediterranean climate, abbreviated "Csb" on climate maps.

Climate data for Packwood
| Month | Jan | Feb | Mar | Apr | May | Jun | Jul | Aug | Sep | Oct | Nov | Dec | Year |
|---|---|---|---|---|---|---|---|---|---|---|---|---|---|
| Record high °F (°C) | 67 (19) | 77 (25) | 85 (29) | 90 (32) | 102 (39) | 104 (40) | 108 (42) | 105 (41) | 105 (41) | 97 (36) | 75 (24) | 63 (17) | 108 (42) |
| Mean daily maximum °F (°C) | 42.9 (6.1) | 48.1 (8.9) | 52.6 (11.4) | 59 (15) | 66.3 (19.1) | 71.6 (22.0) | 79 (26) | 79.1 (26.2) | 73.9 (23.3) | 61.9 (16.6) | 48.4 (9.1) | 42.3 (5.7) | 60.4 (15.8) |
| Mean daily minimum °F (°C) | 29.3 (−1.5) | 30.5 (−0.8) | 32.8 (0.4) | 36.5 (2.5) | 41.8 (5.4) | 47.4 (8.6) | 51 (11) | 50.7 (10.4) | 44.7 (7.1) | 38.5 (3.6) | 33.3 (0.7) | 29.8 (−1.2) | 38.9 (3.8) |
| Record low °F (°C) | −9 (−23) | −2 (−19) | 2 (−17) | 20 (−7) | 20 (−7) | 27 (−3) | 28 (−2) | 29 (−2) | 23 (−5) | 17 (−8) | −3 (−19) | −8 (−22) | −9 (−23) |
| Average precipitation inches (mm) | 9.01 (229) | 6 (150) | 5.31 (135) | 3.39 (86) | 2.54 (65) | 2.08 (53) | 0.72 (18) | 1.06 (27) | 2.24 (57) | 4.88 (124) | 8.87 (225) | 9.05 (230) | 55.14 (1,401) |
| Average snowfall inches (cm) | 11.8 (30) | 4.7 (12) | 2.8 (7.1) | 0.3 (0.76) | 0 (0) | 0 (0) | 0 (0) | 0 (0) | 0 (0) | 0 (0) | 1.9 (4.8) | 6.4 (16) | 27.9 (71) |
| Average precipitation days (≥ 0.01 inch) | 17 | 14 | 16 | 14 | 12 | 10 | 4 | 5 | 8 | 13 | 17 | 17 | 147 |

== Demographics ==
Historical population
| Census | Pop. | Note | %± |
|---|---|---|---|
| 2010 | 342 | | — |
| 2020 | 319 | | −6.7% |
U.S. Decennial Census; 2000 2010

Packwood first appeared as a census designated place in the 2010 U.S. census.

=== Racial and ethnic composition ===
Packwood CDP, Washington – Racial and ethnic composition Note: the US Census treats Hispanic/Latino as an ethnic category. This table excludes Latinos from the racial categories and assigns them to a separate category. Hispanics/Latinos may be of any race.
| Race / Ethnicity (NH = Non-Hispanic) | Pop 2010 | Pop 2020 | % 2010 | % 2020 |
|---|---|---|---|---|
| White alone (NH) | 311 | 288 | 90.94% | 90.28% |
| Black or African American alone (NH) | 0 | 1 | 0.00% | 0.31% |
| Native American or Alaska Native alone (NH) | 4 | 3 | 1.17% | 0.94% |
| Asian alone (NH) | 2 | 3 | 0.58% | 0.94% |
| Native Hawaiian or Pacific Islander alone (NH) | 0 | 0 | 0.00% | 0.00% |
| Other race alone (NH) | 0 | 4 | 0.00% | 1.25% |
| Mixed race or Multiracial (NH) | 4 | 13 | 1.17% | 4.08% |
| Hispanic or Latino (any race) | 21 | 7 | 6.14% | 2.19% |
| Total | 342 | 319 | 100.00% | 100.00% |

== Arts and culture ==
=== Historic buildings and sites ===
East of Packwood is the La Wis Wis Guard Station No. 1165, a rustic cabin built by the Civilian Conservation Corps; the stations is listed on the National Register of Historic Places.

The Packwood Ranger Station dates to 1928, when the Forest Service began use of the site under a lease with the Menasha Woodenware Company. It served as headquarters of the Packwood Ranger District until 1996.

=== Tourism ===
Packwood hosts the Packwood Flea Market which was officially established in 1973 and is one of largest flea markets in the Western United States. The twice-annual event, which is organized by participants of the market, is held on Memorial Day and Labor Day weekends.

== Parks and recreation ==
Packwood is home to the Skate Creek Park Natural Area. Officially listed as the Washington State Parks Packwood Property, the land is owned by the state though considered surplus. The park is approximately 180 acres (73 ha) in size. Attempts to transfer the parcel to the Lewis County parks department was considered but did not materialize; the county officially passed on the transfer in 2022.

The Cowlitz River Public Access Park opened in 2022, The park lacks a boat ramp but a nature trail allows users to access to the Cowlitz River. The Packwood Ballpark, under the oversight of the Lewis County Public Utility District, hosts a baseball field and open areas.

The trailhead for Loowit Tier, a 197-mile (317 km) bikepacking trail, is located in Packwood and spans to the Columbia River Gorge through Gifford Pinchot National Forest and Mount St. Helens National Volcanic Monument. Unveiled in 2025, the trail is part of a larger, 5,000-mile (8,000 km) bike trail system known as Orogenesis; the Loowit portion is the first completed section of the project. The community group, the Packwood Trail Project, also part of a large Upper Cowlitz Valley Trails Coalition, has undertaken efforts to expand and create long-distance hiking paths near the town.

== Economy ==
The town of Packwood has historically relied on the forest products industry as an economic engine, supplemented by government employment (via the National Forest and Park Services) and seasonal tourism.

In 1998, 220 jobs were lost when the Packwood Lumber Mill closed because of the depressed Pacific Northwest lumber industry. The Packwood Ranger Station closed in 2003 after budget cuts in the US Forest Service and operations for the Cowlitz Valley Ranger District were centralized in nearby Randle. By 2010, the full-time population of Packwood had halved and many residences had become second homes or vacation rentals.

Packwood has become an increasingly popular vacation destination. Proximity to White Pass Ski Area, expanded in 2010 by 767 acres, brings in visitors over the winter and access to Mount Rainier National Park and Gifford Pinchot National Forest brings visitors over the summer. Home prices in Packwood increased 300% between 2012 and 2022, leading to housing difficulties for seasonal employees of the area's outdoor recreation sector.

== Government and politics ==
=== Politics ===
Presidential Elections Results
| | Packwood precinct | | | Big Bottom precinct | | |
| Year | Republican | Democratic | Third parties | Republican | Democratic | Third parties |
|---|---|---|---|---|---|---|
| 2008 (Note: The Lewis County Auditor did not list a vote tabulation under a distinct Packwood voting district during the November 04, 2008 General Election.) | 0.0% 0 | 0.0% 0 | 0.0% 0 | 50.3% 301 | 47.0% 281 | 2.7% 16 |
| 2012 | 48.1% 77 | 48.1% 77 | 3.8% 6 | 52.0% 294 | 45.5% 257 | 2.5% 14 |
| 2016 | 55.4% 93 | 37.5% 63 | 7.1% 12 | 58.5% 312 | 34.7% 185 | 6.8% 36 |
| 2020 | 52.8% 103 | 45.1% 88 | 2.1% 4 | 56.0% 387 | 41.4% 286 | 2.6% 18 |
| 2024 | 54.4% 99 | 42.3% 77 | 3.3% 6 | 55.6% 350 | 39.5% 249 | 4.9% 31 |

Between the Big Bottom and Packwood voting districts in the 2024 election, there were 2 votes cast for write-in candidates and 22 votes were tallied for Robert F. Kennedy Jr.

== Education ==
The first school in Packwood was built in 1915. when the community was known as Lewis. Then part of what was considered the largest school district in the United States, its first class included 11 students. The original schoolhouse was replaced in 1938 with a brick structure that housed an auditorium and in 1953, the Packwood boys' basketball team won the state championship.

Packwood is located in the White Pass School District, which, in addition to Packwood, covers the small towns of Randle and Glenoma and the vast forested expanse in extreme eastern Lewis County, terminating at the crest of the Cascades and the border with Yakima County. In 2004, the town's school-age population dropped to the point that the local K–6 elementary school was shuttered, although in 2007 the building was converted to the White Pass Country Historical Museum and now houses a local museum and hosts community events.

== Infrastructure ==
Packwood is accessible year-round by private vehicle on US 12, and seasonally by SR 123 and several forest service roads. The general aviation Packwood Airport is located three blocks west of highway 12 in downtown Packwood. As of October 2024, Lewis County Transit's Brown Line provides two round-trip weekday routes to and from Centralia-Chehalis, including connections to Amtrak and Greyhound.

The community is among 8 locations that are part of an EV installation project on the White Pass Scenic Byway. The program will stretch from the White Pass Ski Area to Chehalis and is run in partnership with Lewis County PUD, Twin Transit, state government agencies, and local community efforts. The venture began in 2023 from two grants totaling over $1.8 million.
