= Washington State Heritage Register =

The Washington Heritage Register is an official list of sites and properties found throughout Washington state, United States.

The Washington Heritage Register is administered by the Washington State Department of Archaeology and Historic Preservation, and it is governed by several state laws including RCW 27.34.200 and 25-12 WAC.

The register includes districts, sites, buildings, structures, and objects which meet criteria as being significant to local or state history and culture. The register does not provide fiscal support to listed entries; instead, listing is an honorary designation which raises public awareness.

Sites which are listed on the National Register of Historic Places are automatically added to the Washington Heritage Register.
