= Thomas Chalmers Vint =

American landscape architect (1894–1967)

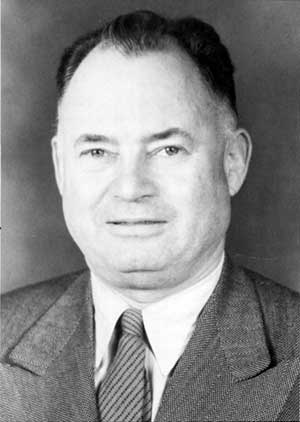
Thomas Chalmers Vint, c. 1957

Thomas Chalmers Vint (August 15, 1894 – October 26, 1967) was a landscape architect credited for directing and shaping landscape planning and development during the early years of the United States National Park System. His work at Yosemite National Park and the development of the Mission 66 program are among his better known projects, although his influence can be seen in parks across America. Vint's true talents lay in his design elements. These can best be described as rustic, relating to how he was able to harmonize structures with their natural surroundings. Vint was awarded the Distinguished Service Award, the highest honor conferred for meritorious service to the U.S. government. He was made a Fellow of the American Society of Landscape Architects and American Institute of Architects.

== Early life ==
Born in Salt Lake City, Utah to Scots-Irish parents, Vint's family moved shortly after his birth to Los Angeles where he spent his grade school years. Vint attended Polytechnic High School and upon graduation enrolled at the University of California, Berkeley into the field of landscape architecture. During his college years Vint worked for design and building firms throughout Los Angeles. He also found employment for an entire year alongside the successful landscape architect Lloyd Wright, the son of the famed architect Frank Lloyd Wright.

== Role in the National Park System ==
By November 1922, Vint was employed as a draftsman for the landscape architect Daniel Ray Hull. Hull was the National Park System's chief landscape engineer for Yosemite National Park, a project which Vint soon became familiar with. One year later, in 1923, Vint rose to the position of assistant landscape engineer for the National Park System, working alongside architects Gilbert Stanley Underwood and Herbert Maier.

In the summer of 1924 as Hull's assistant, Vint met with NPS Director Stephen Mather, Chief Engineer George Goodwin and Park Superintendent Charles Kraebel near Logan Pass in Glacier National Park to review and discuss the route of the proposed Transmountain Highway through the park. Goodwin proposed a route involving 15 switchbacks and grades up to 8% ascending up the Logan Creek drainage to the pass. Vint decried Goodwin's route saying it would look "like miners had been there." Drawing on his training as a landscape architect, Vint instead proposed a simple route of one switchback with a gently rising grade of 6% that would meet the NPS goal of “lying lightly on the land.” After that meeting Mather consulted with Bureau of Public Roads (BPR) engineer Bill Austin and others as to which route should be selected. All agreed that while Vint's route would be more expensive it would more closely meet the NPS policies of preserving the scenic landscape. The result is the now famous Going-to-the-Sun Road, completed in 1932, that is enjoyed by millions of visitors. As another important result of this process the NPS and BPR (now Federal Highway Administration) entered into a collaboration that set a policy for all future National Park Service Roads.

Vint became an associate landscape engineer in 1926, and the following year he was promoted to the position of chief landscape architect for the Yosemite project, outranking Hull. In 1933 Vint moved to Washington to become the chief of the Park Service Branch of Plans and Designs, a position that was enormously influential in the planning, construction and conservation of the national parks. Vint was particularly active in the formulation and administration of design standards associated with the Park Service's Mission 66 program. He continued to be the foremost authority on architecture and landscape architecture for the National Park Service until retiring in the 1960s.

== Design style ==
At a time when park designers were focusing inward to plan appropriate park infrastructure, Vint masterfully dealt with the new influx of people spawned by the ever-growing automobile age. More people headed to parks now, and facilities were becoming overwhelmed. Vint did not see this as a negative effect. He knew that the presence of people in the park would help with the park service's expansion and ultimately preservation, so long as structures harmonized with their environment. To solve these problems Vint knew it was important to understand the land well and how people would use this land, whether by themselves or in the presence of others. The need for new construction was evident, though Vint knew it would be important to not let new structures detract from the beauty of the nature in the park. His experimentation with using native materials such as logs and stone to construct buildings and bridges helped to naturalize the park environment. This design philosophy can be found in the plans of an earlier landscape architect, Frederick Law Olmsted, whose work in places such as New York City's Central Park clearly influenced Vint's designs.

As Vint rose in the Park Service hierarchy, he quickly became influential in park planning processes. In particular, Vint formulated the first master plan for any Park Service unit, at Mount Rainier National Park in 1931, which would be established as a basic planning principle from that point on for every park. One of the principles established in this study was the specific designation of certain park areas as wilderness.

== Legacy ==
During his time as chief landscape architect for the National Park Service, Vint managed to expand the landscape program of the park service into an efficient system with a foundation in the idea of natural designs and landscape preservation. He successfully created environments meeting the park service requirements of being accessible to the public while at the same time preserving the sites the way they are for future generations to enjoy. Through his rustic designs, Thomas Vint managed to produce environments that were not a mix of buildings and trees, but rather fluid landscapes that emphasized the beauty of their surroundings.

Vint was awarded the Distinguished Service Award, the highest honor conferred for meritorious service to the U.S. government. He was made a Fellow of the American Society of Landscape Architects and American Institute of Architects.

== Notable projects ==
- Blue Ridge Parkway
- Colonial National Historical Park
- Going-to-the-Sun Road
- Oregon Caves National Monument
- Historic American Buildings Survey

== Family life ==
Vint had a son, Thomas Tam Vint, who was also a landscape architect.
