= List of flooded towns in the United States =

These are U.S. towns and villages flooded by the creation of dams, destroyed by the advancing sea, or washed away in floods and never rebuilt.

== List of towns drowned by dam construction ==
| State | Town | Reservoir | Notes |
|---|---|---|---|
| Alabama | Bainbridge | Wilson Lake | |
| Alabama | Kowaliga | Lake Martin | |
| Alabama | Prairie Bluff | William "Bill" Dannelly Reservoir | |
| Alabama | Riverton | Pickwick Lake | |
| Arizona | Alamo Crossing | Alamo Lake | |
| Arizona | Aubrey Landing | Lake Havasu | |
| Arizona | Castle Dome Landing | Martinez Lake | |
| Arizona | La Laguna | Mittry Lake | |
| Arkansas | Crossroads | Lake Maumelle | |
| Arkansas | Dubuque | Bull Shoals Lake | |
| Arkansas | Monte Ne | Beaver Lake | |
| Arkansas | Kingdon Springs | Bull Shoals Lake | |
| California | Alma | Lexington Reservoir | |
| California | Bagby | Lake McClure | |
| California | Baird | Lake Shasta | |
| California | Copper City | Lake Shasta | |
| California | Elmore | Lake Shasta | |
| California | Etter | Lake Shasta | |
| California | Kennett | Lake Shasta | |
| California | Morley | Lake Shasta | |
| California | Pitt | Lake Shasta | |
| California | Winthrop | Lake Shasta | |
| California | Bidwell's Bar | Lake Oroville | |
| California | Camanche | Camanche Reservoir | |
| California | Poverty Bar | Camanche Reservoir | |
| California | Cedar Springs | Silverwood Lake | |
| California | Crystal Springs | Crystal Springs Reservoir | |
| California | Jacksonville | Don Pedro Reservoir | |
| California | Melones | New Melones Lake | |
| California | Monticello | Lake Berryessa | |
| California | Condemned Bar | Folsom Lake | |
| California | Mormon Island | Folsom Lake | |
| California | Salmon Falls | Folsom Lake | |
| California | Old Isabella | Lake Isabella | |
| California | Old Kernville | Lake Isabella | |
| California | Prattville | Lake Almanor | |
| California | Searsville | Searsville Lake | |
| California | Whiskeytown | Whiskeytown Lake | |
| Colorado | Sopris | Trinidad Lake | |
| Colorado | Dillon | Dillon Reservoir | |
| Colorado | Stout | Horsetooth Reservoir | |
| Colorado | Sapinero | Blue Mesa Reservoir | |
| Connecticut | Barkhamstad Hollow | Barkhamsted Reservoir | |
| Connecticut | Jerusalem | Candlewood Lake | |
| Connecticut | Valley Forge | Saugatuck Reservoir | |
| Georgia (U.S. state) | Oscarville | Lake Lanier | |
| Georgia (U.S. state) | Etowah | Allatoona Lake | |
| Georgia (U.S. state) | Allatoona | Allatoona Lake | |
| Georgia (U.S. state) | Petersburg | Lake Strom Thurmond | |
| Illinois | Cotton Hill | Lake Springfield | |
| Indiana | Fairfield | Brookville Lake | |
| Indiana | Somerset | Mississinewa Lake | |
| Indiana | Elon | Patoka Lake | |
| Indiana | Ellsworth, Indiana | Patoka Lake | |
| Indiana | Newton Stewart, Indiana | Patoka Lake | |
| Kentucky | Eddyville, Kentucky | Lake Barkley | |
| Kentucky | Kuttawa, Kentucky | Lake Barkley | |
| Kentucky | Birmingham, Kentucky | Kentucky Lake | |
| Kentucky | Burnside, Kentucky | Lake Cumberland | |
| Maine | Flagstaff | Flagstaff Lake | |
| Maryland | Conowingo | Conowingo Reservoir | |
| Maryland | Warren | Loch Raven Reservoir | |
| Massachusetts | Dana | Quabbin Reservoir | |
| Massachusetts | Enfield | Quabbin Reservoir | |
| Massachusetts | Greenwich | Quabbin Reservoir | |
| Massachusetts | Prescott | Quabbin Reservoir | |
| Michigan | Rawsonville | Belleville Lake | |
| Missouri | Linn Creek, Missouri | Lake of the Ozarks | |
| Mississippi | Coldwater | Arkabutla Lake | |
| Montana | Canton | Canyon Ferry Lake | |
| Nevada | St. Thomas | Lake Mead | |
| New York (state) | Arena | Pepacton Reservoir | |
| New York (state) | Pepacton | Pepacton Reservoir | |
| New York (state) | Shavertown | Pepacton Reservoir | |
| New York (state) | Boiceville | Ashokan Reservoir | |
| New York (state) | Brown's Station | Ashokan Reservoir | |
| New York (state) | Glenford | Ashokan Reservoir | |
| New York (state) | Olive | Ashokan Reservoir | |
| New York (state) | Olive Bridge | Ashokan Reservoir | |
| New York (state) | Shokan | Ashokan Reservoir | |
| New York (state) | Stony Hollow | Ashokan Reservoir | |
| New York (state) | West Hurley | Ashokan Reservoir | |
| New York (state) | West Shokan | Ashokan Reservoir | |
| New York (state) | Cannonsville | Cannonsville Reservoir | |
| New York (state) | Elko | Allegheny Reservoir | |
| New York (state) | Gilboa | Schoharie Reservoir | |
| New York (state) | Kensico | Kensico Reservoir | |
| New York (state) | Neversink | Neversink Reservoir | |
| North Carolina | East Monbo | Lake Norman | |
| North Carolina | Long Island | Lake Norman | |
| North Carolina | Fonta Flora | Lake James | |
| North Carolina | Judson | Fontana Lake | |
| North Carolina | Proctor | Fontana Lake | |
| New Jersey | Round Valley | Round Valley Reservoir | |
| Oregon | Arlington | Lake Umatilla | |
| Oregon | Blalock | Lake Umatilla | |
| Oregon | Celilo | Lake Celilo | |
| Oregon | Copper | Applegate Reservoir | |
| Oregon | Detroit | Detroit Lake | |
| Oregon | Dorena | Dorena Reservoir | |
| Oregon | Robinette | Brownlee Reservoir | |
| Pennsylvania | Aitch | Raystown Lake | |
| Pennsylvania | Big Creek Valley | Beltzville Lake | |
| Pennsylvania | Cokeville | Conemaugh River Lake | |
| Pennsylvania | Fillmore | Conemaugh River Lake | |
| Pennsylvania | Livermore | Conemaugh River Lake | |
| Pennsylvania | Social Hall | Conemaugh River Lake | |
| Pennsylvania | Corydon | Allegheny Reservoir | |
| Pennsylvania | Kinzua | Allegheny Reservoir | |
| Pennsylvania | Instanter | East Branch Lake | |
| Pennsylvania | Marburg | Lake Marburg | |
| Pennsylvania | Milford Mills | Marsh Creek Lake | |
| Pennsylvania | Somerfield | Youghiogheny River Lake | |
| Pennsylvania | Straight | East Branch Lake | |
| Pennsylvania | Tohickon | Lake Nockamixon | |
| Pennsylvania | Wilsonville | Lake Wallenpaupack | |
| Rhode Island | Scituate | Scituate Reservoir | |
| South Carolina | Dutch Fork | Lake Murray | |
| South Carolina | Saxe Gotha | Lake Murray | |
| South Carolina | Ferguson | Lake Marion | |
| South Carolina | Andersonville | Lake Hartwell | |
| Tennessee | Awalt | Tims Ford Lake | |
| Tennessee | Butler | Watauga Reservoir | |
| Tennessee | Loyston | Norris Reservoir | |
| Tennessee | Willow Grove | Dale Hollow Reservoir | |
| Tennessee | Morganton | Tellico Reservoir | |
| Tennessee | Tuskegee | Tellico Reservoir | |
| Tennessee | Johnsonville, Tennessee | Kentucky Lake | |
| Tennessee | Couchville, Tennessee | Percy Priest Lake | |
| Texas | Aiken | Belton Lake | |
| Texas | Bland | Belton Lake | |
| Texas | Brookhaven | Belton Lake | |
| Texas | Sparta | Belton Lake | |
| Texas | Curry | Hubbard Creek Reservoir | |
| Texas | Bluffton | Lake Buchanan | |
| Texas | Devils River | Lake Amistad | |
| Texas | Friendship | Granger Lake | |
| Texas | Halsell | Lake Arrowhead | |
| Texas | Preston | Lake Texoma | |
| Texas | Towash | Lake Whitney | |
| Texas | Canyon City | Canyon Lake | |
| Utah | Connellsville | Electric Lake | |
| Utah | Hite | Lake Powell | |
| Utah | Hailstone | Jordanelle Reservoir | |
| Utah | Keetley | Jordanelle Reservoir | |
| Utah | Linwood | Flaming Gorge Reservoir | |
| Utah | Rockport | Rockport Reservoir | |
| Washington (state) | Kosmos | Riffe Lake | |
| Washington (state) | Nesika | Riffe Lake | |
| Washington (state) | Riffe | Riffe Lake | |
| Washington (state) | Mayfield | Lake Mayfield | |
| Washington (state) | Vantage | Lake Wanapum | |
| West Virginia | Shaw | Jennings Randolph Lake | |
| West Virginia | Gad | Summersville Lake | |

== List of towns drowned by erosion or flooding ==
=== Alabama ===
- Washington

=== Alaska ===
- Chenega, the original location of which was destroyed in a Tsunami caused by the Good Friday earthquake in 1964.
- Minto, the original site of which was abandoned due to repeat flooding.
- Mumtrak, abandoned due to repeat flooding.
- Holikachuk, abandoned due to flooding and inaccessibility.

=== Arizona ===
- Adamsville, never rebuilt after being largely destroyed by a flood.
- Colorado City, destroyed by the Great Flood of 1862

=== Arkansas ===
- Napoleon, washed away by the Mississippi River

=== Maryland ===
- Holland Island, destroyed by erosion into Chesapeake Bay

=== Mississippi ===
- Ben Lomond, Mississippi
- New Mexico, Mississippi
- Port Anderson, Mississippi
- Prentiss, Bolivar County, Mississippi

=== Oregon ===
- Bayocean, destroyed by erosion into the Pacific Ocean
- Champoeg, destroyed by the Great Flood of 1862
- Linn City, destroyed by the Great Flood of 1862
- Orleans, destroyed by the Great Flood of 1862
- Vanport, destroyed by the flooding of the Columbia River

=== Utah ===
- Adventure, destroyed by the Great Flood of 1862

== See also ==
- Lists of ghost towns in the United States
