= Riffe, Washington =

- Flooded town
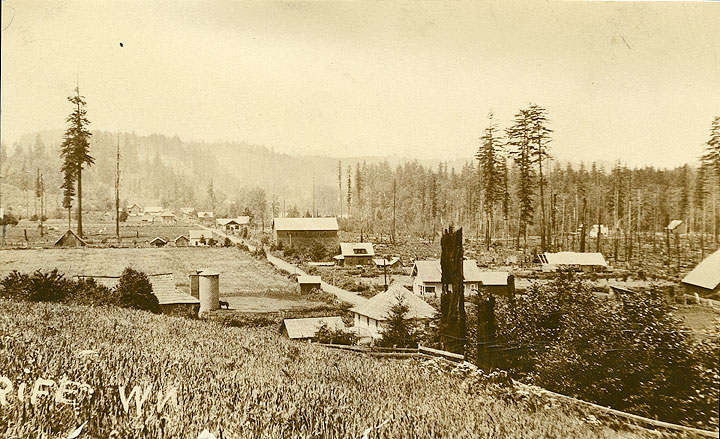
- Riffe, Washington, ca. 1910

- Location within Washington (state) Location within the United States
- Coordinates: 46°30′50.39″N 122°22′13.38″W
- Country: United States
- State: Washington
- County: Lewis
- Established: 1893-1894
- Flooded: 1968
- Elevation: 781 ft (238 m)

Population (1966)
  - Total: 350 (approx.)
- Time zone: UTC-8 (Pacific (PST))
  - Summer (DST): UTC-7 (PDT)
- GNIS feature ID: 1525047

Riffe, Washington was an unincorporated town located on a bank of the Cowlitz River in Lewis County, Washington, southeast of Mossyrock. The community was abandoned by the populace by 1966 and officially ceased to exist in 1968 when it was flooded under Riffe Lake after construction of the Mossyrock Dam.

Riffe was the third attempted settlement in the area, following the communities of Baugh and Osborn, and was established by Floyd Riffe after he arrived in the region in 1893. The town's early population consisted mostly of migrants from Southern Appalachia. A post office was begun in 1898 and a small community grew, peaking by the 1960s with an estimated population of 350 people and containing a few businesses and residences.

Plans for a dam system on the river began in the 1940s and Tacoma City Light gained ownership over Riffe by use of eminent domain in 1963. Despite the transfer of property ownership, the post office remained operational until 1966. The town was slowly abandoned and two cemeteries relocated in anticipation of a reservoir that was to flood the community. Buildings and local flora were leveled or burned and only a few caretakers remained when floodwaters began to submerge Riffe in 1968. During times of low water levels on Riffe Lake, remains of the town can be seen in the present-day.

== Etymology ==
A town known as Baugh was located 2.5 miles (4.0 km) farther up the Cowlitz River when the settler community of Riffe began. Combining, the new settlement was named in honor of Floyd Riffe approximately in 1897. Riffe Lake, renamed from Davisson Lake officially in 1976, also takes its name from Floyd Riffe and the town.

== History ==
A homestead settlement known as Osborn exited previously at the site that officially became Riffe; (Note: The original Osborn settlement was known under two other spellings, Osborne and Osburn. See sources throughout the section for the discrepancy.) early settlers were mostly from Southern Appalachia. Named after its founder, Wilbur J. Osborne, a post office opened in 1886 and served other communities in the valley, discontinuing in April 1896 with mail delivered to Swofford afterwards. Mail delivery was eventually handled at Baugh.

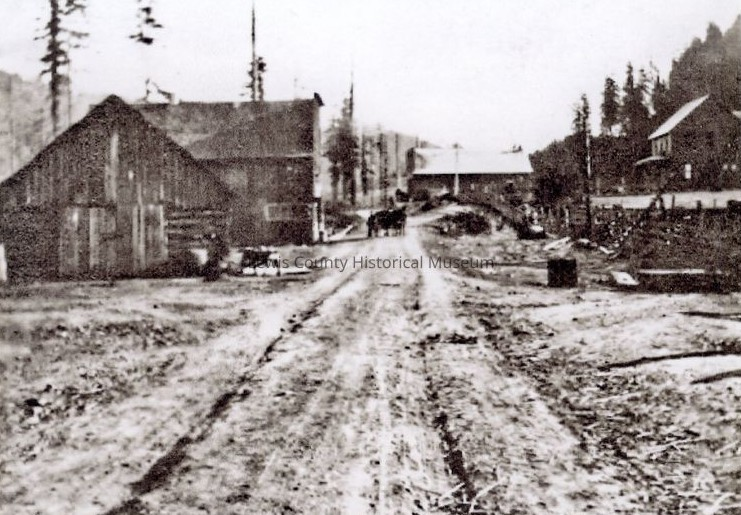
Riffe, ca. 1896

Arriving from West Virginia in 1893, (Note: The establishment date based on the Riffe family's arrival to the area is sometimes reported as 1894 despite evidence to the contrary. The incorrect date may reflect the completed build of the town or the opening of the first Riffe post office.) Floyd Riffe and his wife, Armedia (Blankenship), settled on an existing claim, known as the Bodiford homestead. Floyd Riffe was born in 1859 in North Springs, West Virginia and was an ordained Baptist minister. To grow the settlement, he helped provide travel by railroad in September 1893 for 60 people belonging to his home church near Greenbriar, West Virginia. The group and the Riffe family lived on the Bodiford homestead in a vacant cabin until the community could be built. Floyd purchased 160 acres (65 ha) of the claim, located on a bank of the Cowlitz River, in November 1893. The Riffe family and new community members cleared land, toppling old-growth trees for lumber to build homes.

The first church in the Osborn-Baugh town was Sulphur Creek Church, begun in 1888. Rebuilt in 1900 after a fire destroyed church records in 1897, the congregation merged with Cowlitz River Church in 1938, which was formed in 1904. Renamed Bethel Primitive Baptist Church, the congregation moved to Mossyrock after Riffe was flooded, constructing a new house of worship. Floyd served as Riffe's congregation pastor from 1900 until he died in 1943.

In the early 20th century, led by Floyd Riffe, additional settlers arrived from Appalachia to settle in the town and other communities such as Glenoma, known as "Little Kentucky", and Verndale. Farming became the economic engine of the town, with residents selling a variety of fruits, livestock, and vegetables in markets located in Chehalis.

The community by the 1950s consisted of a few homes, some businesses, and a gas station. Before the community was announced to be flooded, Riffe had an approximate population of 350 people.

=== Post office ===
A post office was begun at the home of Mr. Riffe in 1894, (Note: Floyd Riffe served as postmaster until 1904.) thus naming the town. An officially recognized post office was constructed and opened on September 20, 1898; it remained in operation until May 31, 1966. (Note: Mail was handled at a post office in Aljune after the 1966 closure.) The closure was due to the town being purchased by Tacoma Public Utilities during the early construction phase of Mossyrock Dam.

In October 1921, the post office was moved to a newly constructed store building owned by A.P. (Amos) Sloan, who became the postmaster. Sloan was charged in 1924 with firing six shots at Riffe mail carrier Harmon Justice, who was unharmed. Sloan, injured by a ricochet bullet, had also been previously accused of firing at a neighbor in the town.

The Riffe post office recorded a high of 1,500 residents who received mail; by the 1966 closure, only 50 people remained on the route.

=== Flooding ===
Water rights on the Cowlitz River were first purchased by utility provider Tacoma City Light (TCL) in 1946 for future use as a hydroelectric dam. Receiving permission to build a dam in 1951, TCL first surveyed the region around Riffe for such use in 1955. The power company, under eminent domain laws, took possession of Riffe in 1963. Construction of Mayfield Dam was completed in 1963 and Mossyrock Dam was erected beginning in February 1966, completed in 1968. The projects were waylaid by local protests and regional opposition, with lawsuits reaching the United States Supreme Court on three occasions. The court cases, which included concerns over Cowlitz tribal and homeowner land rights as well as the loss of a state operated fish hatchery, postponed the initial construction assessment by 15 years.

Tacoma City Light paid homeowners for their land and residents were allowed to remain in their homes for 30 days, without a lease, but would have to pay rent if they extended their stay. By 1964, between 75 and 80 people remained and were informed that year that the deadline to move out of the town was between the fall of 1965 and January 1, 1966 after an early coffer dam of the project was completed. Before being flooded, the town's businesses and homes were demolished, and surrounding flora was leveled and burned. Riffe was mostly uninhabited by June 1966 with the exception of caretakers over the abandoned town.

The burial remains of Riffe residents at two cemeteries, a city and private graveyard, were moved beginning in 1964. Requiring the approval of a living relative to move a person's remains, approximately 100 unmarked graves along with 187 marked burial plots had to be relocated. The process was time-consuming as records lost by fire and discontinuation of care over the city cemetery hampered efforts to locate relatives of the deceased. Several unmarked graves were supposedly the burial plots of people who killed a group of young men during a town feud. In total, 242 graves were successfully relocated by September 1965.

The town was submerged under Riffe Lake, the reservoir created by the Mossyrock Dam, in 1968. Along with the Riffe community, the towns of Kosmos and Nesika were also submerged.

A day-use camp and park was proposed by 1969 to be located on the northern bank of the new lake and was to be named after the town. The remnants of the former communities can be seen when water levels on Riffe Lake are low; the town's gas station was noted as still visible under the waters of the lake in 2002.

The new body of water was named Riffe Lake on 1968 maps by the Washington State Highway Department due to a communication error and discrepancies on the Mossyrock dam plans. (Note: Approximately 400,000 issues of the 1968 highway map listing the reservoir as Riffe Lake were produced. The highway department apologized for the "inconvenience" the map may have caused.) The reservoir was originally named Davisson Lake (Note: The United States Board on Geographic Names officially deemed the reservoir name as Davisson Lake in late 1968. Among other proposed monikers, the board rejected the lake be named after Riffe.) after a TCL director with no ties to Lewis County; opposition to change the moniker began locally in 1975 and the name change to Riffe Lake made official on March 12, 1976.

== Geography ==
Riffe was located on a southern bank of the Cowlitz River in eastern Lewis County, Washington. Partial remains of the town exist under Riffe Lake. The Geographic Names Information System lists the community as having been an unincorporated place.

== Education ==
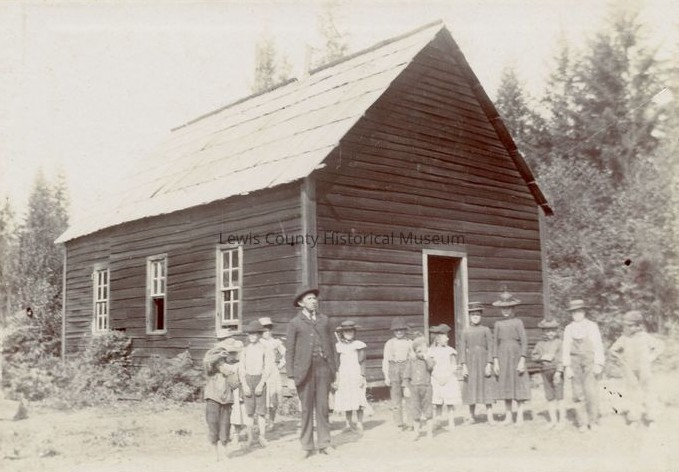
Baugh Schoolhouse, ca. 1900

Education in Riffe's early history was provided at the Baugh schoolhouse. The school developed a 2-acre (0.81 ha) playground in 1913. Once a separate school district, the school consolidated with Mossyrock and nine other communities to form district No. 266 in 1910. Baugh was still recognized as an operating school by 1925.

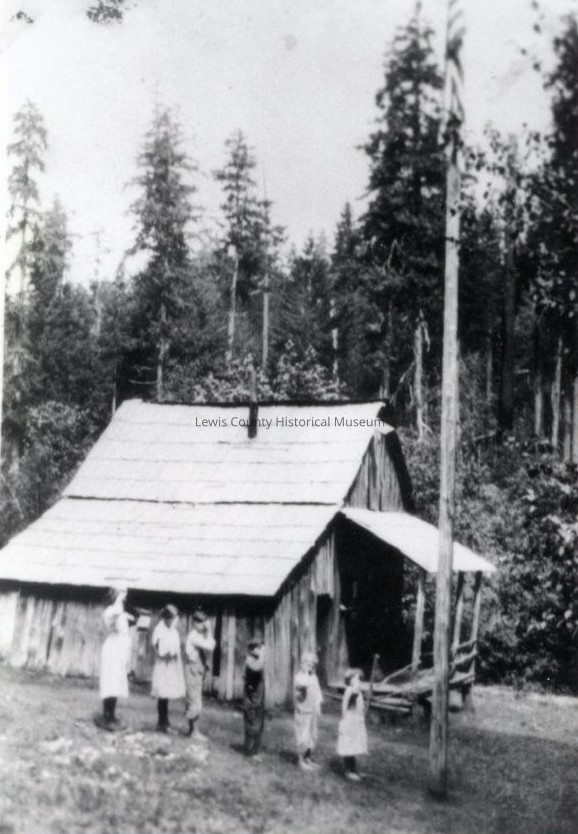
Lone Trail schoolhouse, ca. 1916

An additional schoolhouse located north of Riffe was the Lone Trail school. Named after a Cowlitz tribe trail, the cedar building was situated in a clearing at a fork of two other indigenous trails; the schoolhouse was remote and had no direct road to the building. Student enrollment reached no higher than 10 pupils. The school was moved in 1929 to a farmhouse, providing better access for local students. The original schoolhouse was reported as still standing after World War II but may have been lost when the area was logged soon thereafter.

== Infrastructure ==
The community was home to one of the first recognized automobile stage operators in the county. Operated by Crocket Rose, he drove a Canadian Paterson coach between Mossyrock and Swofford beginning in 1909. The underpowered vehicle used natural horsepower during climbs over the terrain, and the roughly 6-mile (9.7 km) trip took more than a day.

A ferry once served the community, shuttling passengers over the Cowlitz River. The ferry was built after the county apportioned $110 for its construction in December 1899. In May 1915, five people from Morton died after horses tied to a wagon panicked, overturning the ferry as it was forcibly pushed from the dock. A 170 foot (52 metres) bridge was built over the river in 1919 at Riffe after the tragic event; a "lavish" dedication ceremony was held. A hand-powered cable car, located near the Lost Trail school, provided transport over the river for teachers and residents in the Lost Trail valley.

A telephone line was first brought to the community in 1912. Until the creation of a main highway during the dam construction, Riffe was considered a crossroad community between towns in eastern Lewis County and the Big Bottom region.

== See also ==
- List of flooded towns in the United States
