= Taidnapam Park =

Park in Lewis County, Washington

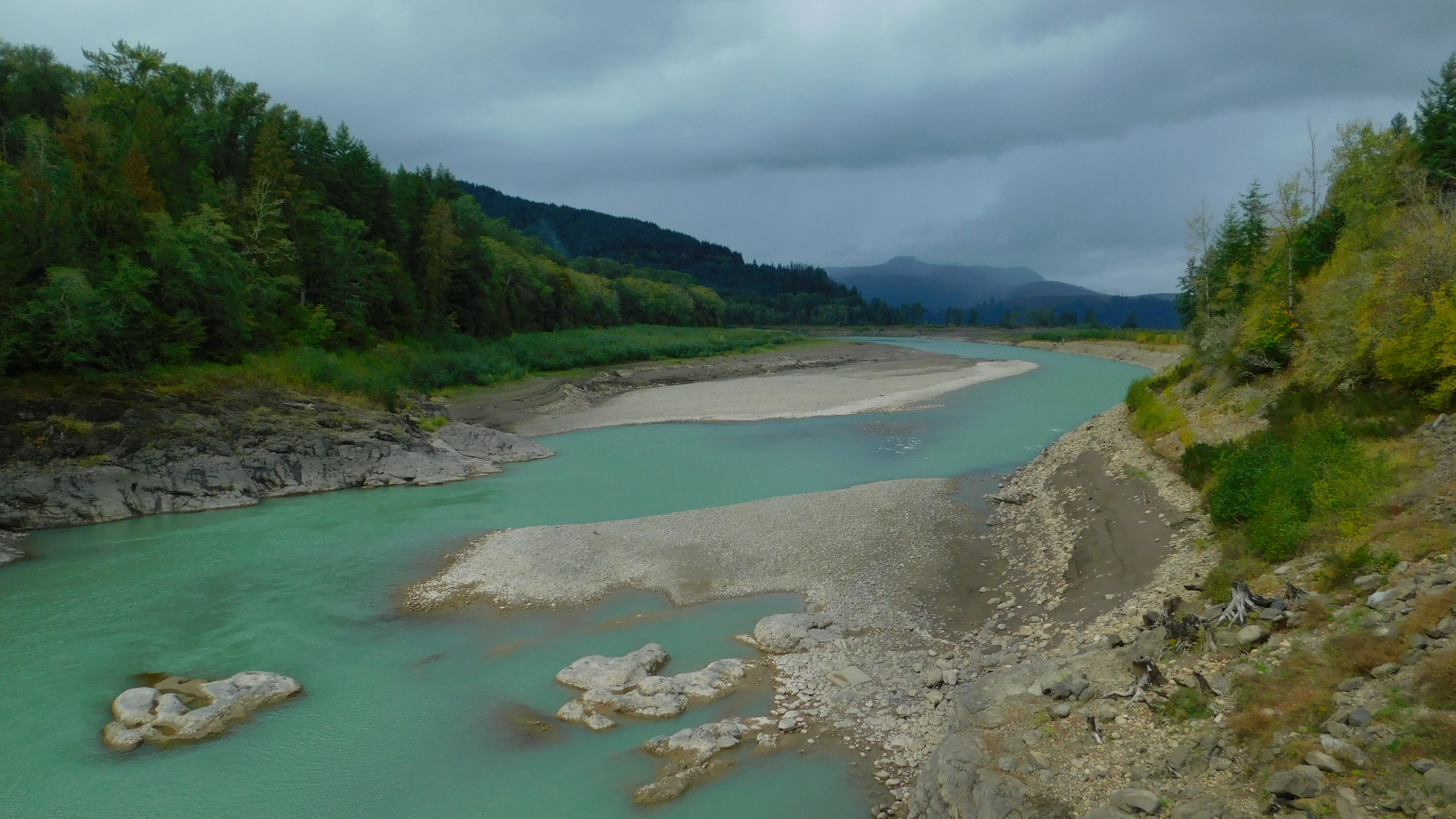
- Taidnapam Park from the 108 Bridge, 2021

- Location within Washington (state)
- Type: Campground, playground, picnic and swim areas, fishing, boat launches
- Location: 117 Cayuse Lane, Glenoma, Washington
- Coordinates: 46°28′12″N 122°09′54″W
- Opened: May 1994
- Etymology: Named after the Upper Cowlitz tribe
- Administrator: Tacoma Power
- Visitors: 34,000 (in 1994)
- Status: Open
- Terrain: Flat
- Water: Riffe Lake, Cowlitz River
- Plants: Native vegetation
- Parking: Parking lot
- Facilities: Bathrooms

Taidnapam Park (tide-nuh-pom) is a park in Lewis County, Washington and is situated in Glenoma at the mouth of the Cowlitz River with its confluence at Riffe Lake. The grounds are under the oversight of Tacoma Public Utilities.

Once settled by indigenous tribes, the grounds were first constructed as a recreation site in the early 1990s, officially becoming a park in 1994. Taidnapam Park provides camping and access to the lake. The site is a popular fishing spot, particularly over the river from a span known as the 108 Bridge. The park is next to Kosmos Flat, a large meadow and wetland preserve, and is also a pass-through for visitors to Mossyrock Dam.

== History ==
The area was once populated by the Cowlitz and Yakama tribes up to 4,600 years ago. The Upper Cowlitz are also known as the Taidnapam.

Taidnapam Park was first known as the Kosmos Recreation Site and construction began in the early 1990s. Taidnapam opened in May 1994 and was listed at being 106 acres (43 ha) in size. Over 34,000 visitors were recorded in its first year. The recreation site has been owned and managed by Tacoma Power during its entirety and is part of the overall Cowlitz River Project.

Expansion of camping amenities began in 2003 as part of Tacoma Power's operating license renewal. The number of campsites were more than doubled and new restrooms and the north boat launch were built. The park's access to Riffe Lake, including boating and fishing, was diminished beginning in 2017 after Tacoma Power lowered water levels due to concerns of damages to downstream communities in the event of a 7.5-magnitude earthquake at Mossyrock Dam.

== Geography ==
Taidnapam Park is situated at the east end of Riffe Lake at the confluence of the Cowlitz River.

== Amenities ==
Taidnapam Park is open during the entire year and provides for overnight camping, including for RV's, and visitors can access Riffe Lake for fishing and other recreational activities. Anglers can also fish by using the park's fishing bridge and the waters include various species of trout. Numerous hiking trails are located on the grounds and there are a variety of picnic and playground amenities.

The cantilevered bridge, known as the Taidnapam Park Bridge or more locally as the 108 Bridge, was awarded first place as a Pedestrian Light Vehicular Bridge at the 1992 National Engineering Timber Bridge Design Competition.

The grounds contain two boat launches. The north launch was specifically constructed so that access to Riffe Lake can occur during low water levels; the south boat ramp was modified after the water levels were lowered in the lake in 2017.

== Features ==
The grounds include a Native American exhibit on the history of the various tribes of the Cowlitz and Yakama. Visitors can pass through the park and visit Mossyrock Dam or travel to a hiking trail to view a 248 foot (76 metres) tall waterfall known as Cathedral Falls.

== Ecology and environment ==
Immediately north of the park is the Kosmos Unit, a part of the Cowlitz Wildlife Area. Also known as Kosmos Flat, the 520-acre (210 ha) site contains a mix of habitats, such as meadow, riparian, and wetland, and is split by Rainey Creek. Parts of the meadow are flooded during peak water levels. The unit contains a small hardwood forest and is known for abundant wildlife, especially various species of birds including pheasants, ospreys, and raptors.
