= Morton, Washington =

City in Washington, United States

Morton
- City
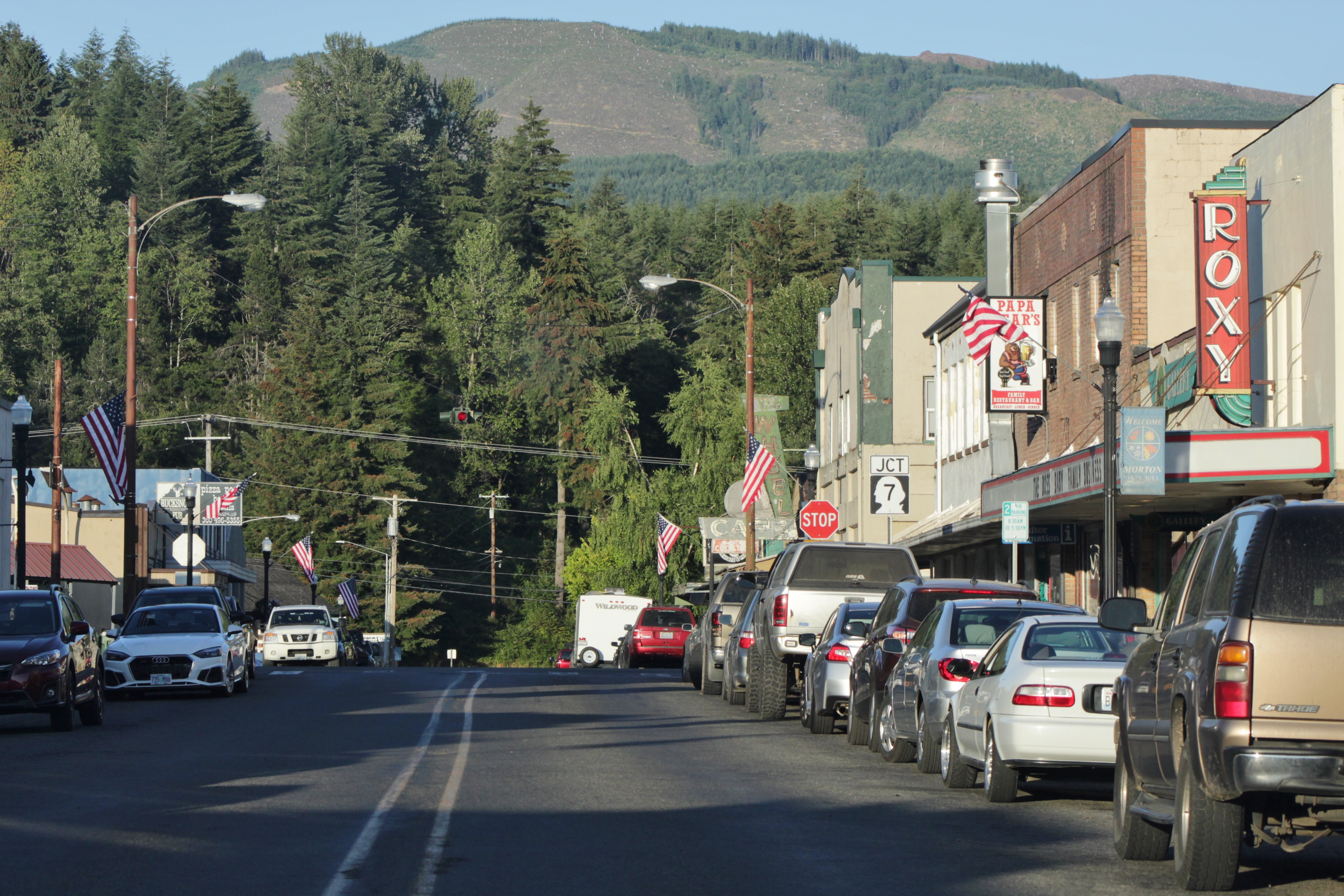
- Main Street (State Route 508) in Morton

- Location of Morton, Washington
- Coordinates: 46°33′27″N 122°16′53″W
- Country: United States
- State: Washington
- County: Lewis
- Incorporated: January 7, 1913

Government
  - Type: Mayor–council
  - Mayor: Rick Mead

Area
  - Total: 0.83 sq mi (2.16 km^{2})
  - Land: 0.82 sq mi (2.13 km^{2})
  - Water: 0.012 sq mi (0.03 km^{2})
- Elevation: 932 ft (284 m)

Population (2020)
  - Total: 1,036
  - Density: 1,460/sq mi (563.6/km^{2})
- Time zone: UTC-8 (Pacific (PST))
  - Summer (DST): UTC-7 (PDT)
- ZIP Code: 98356
- Area code(s): 360, 564
- FIPS code: 53-47175
- GNIS feature ID: 2411171
- Website: www.visitmorton.com

Morton is a city in Lewis County, Washington, United States. It lies north of Riffe Lake in the western foothills of the Cascade Range near Mount Rainier National Park. Morton is at the junction of U.S. Route 12 and State Route 7.

Morton had previously been a village of the Upper Cowlitz people and was first settled by non-indigenous emigrants in 1871. The communinty took its name after Vice President, Levi P. Morton. Historically, timber processing and logging have been staples of the Morton economy.

The city is known for the Morton Loggers' Jubilee, first begun in the late 1930s. The event is known as the "granddaddy of all logging shows". Other features in Morton include a wooden sculpture of a lumberjack, known as "Big Ole", the Roxy Theater located in the downtown district, Gust Backstrom Park, and Strom Field Airport.

The population was 1,036 at the 2020 census.

== History ==
=== 19th century ===
A village of the Upper Cowlitz people, known as Wa-sa, had existed at the present-day site of the city. Morton was first settled in 1871 by James Fletcher. It was later named after Benjamin Harrison's Vice President, Levi P. Morton, in 1889. Morton was officially incorporated on January 7, 1913. Many of Morton's settlers were emigrants from Kentucky.

=== 20th century ===
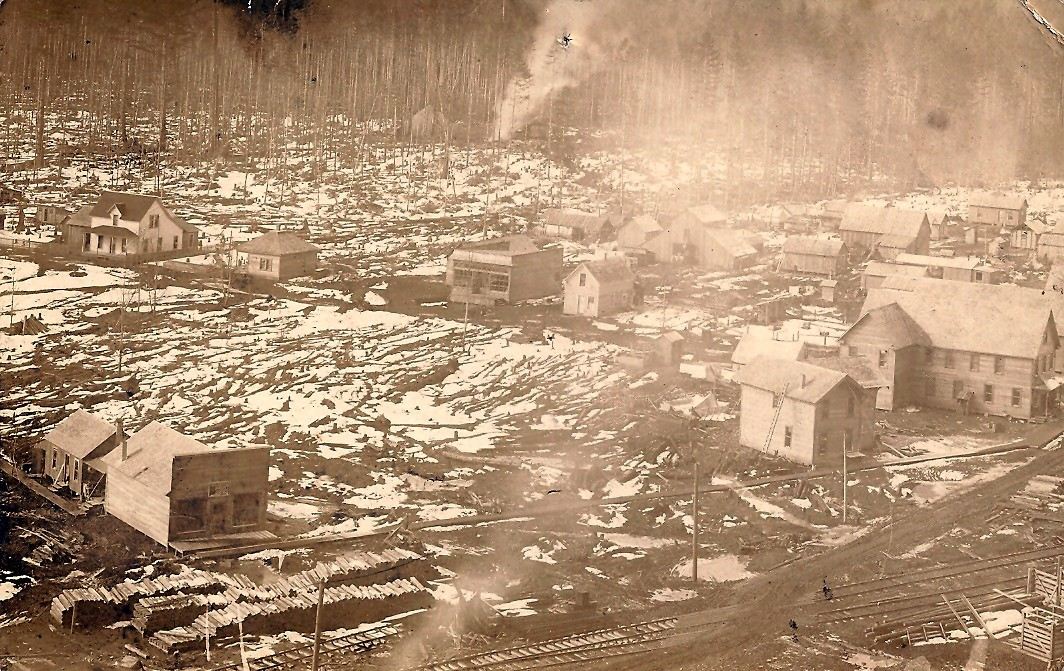
Morton, Washington 1910

In July 1924, a large portion of Morton's downtown district was decimated in a fire, affecting 18 blocks. Beginning at the Hilts Hotel, the blaze spread and destroyed 19 commercial buildings, including structures deemed fireproof. A new building collapsed and the Arcade Theater and two general stores were in ruins. With the exception of a housing section for railroad employees, residential areas in Morton were spared; only one minor injury was reported. Another fire engulfed the area several years later, setting fire to the post office.

The White Pass Highway (part of U.S. Route 12) was relocated through Morton in December 1967 due to the creation of Riffe Lake behind Mossyrock Dam, which inundated the old route.

=== 21st century ===
The city of Morton voted to leave the Timberland Regional Library district by way of proposition in 2022, leaving the city with no public library access.

A state audit of Morton's government accounts was completed in 2024 and revealed a loss of over $937,000. Further investigations produced evidence that the loss was due to the misappropriation of funds by the city's clerk-treasurer, starting in 2013 and continuing into 2021. The city official, who during that time had sole oversight of the city's accounts, was suspected of stealing the money for personal use and resigned after the city instituted a separation of the combined clerk-treasurer position in 2021. In April 2025, the official was charged with wire fraud in federal court and pled guilty the following month. She was ordered to fully repay the stolen funds and sentenced to five years probation. In October 2025, the city was able to recover $799,000 via an insurance organization, the Association of Washington Cities Risk Management Service Agency.

A 15-mile (24 km) stretch of U.S. Route 12 east of Morton was closed during the December 2025 Pacific Northwest floods due to water and debris on the highway.

== Geography ==
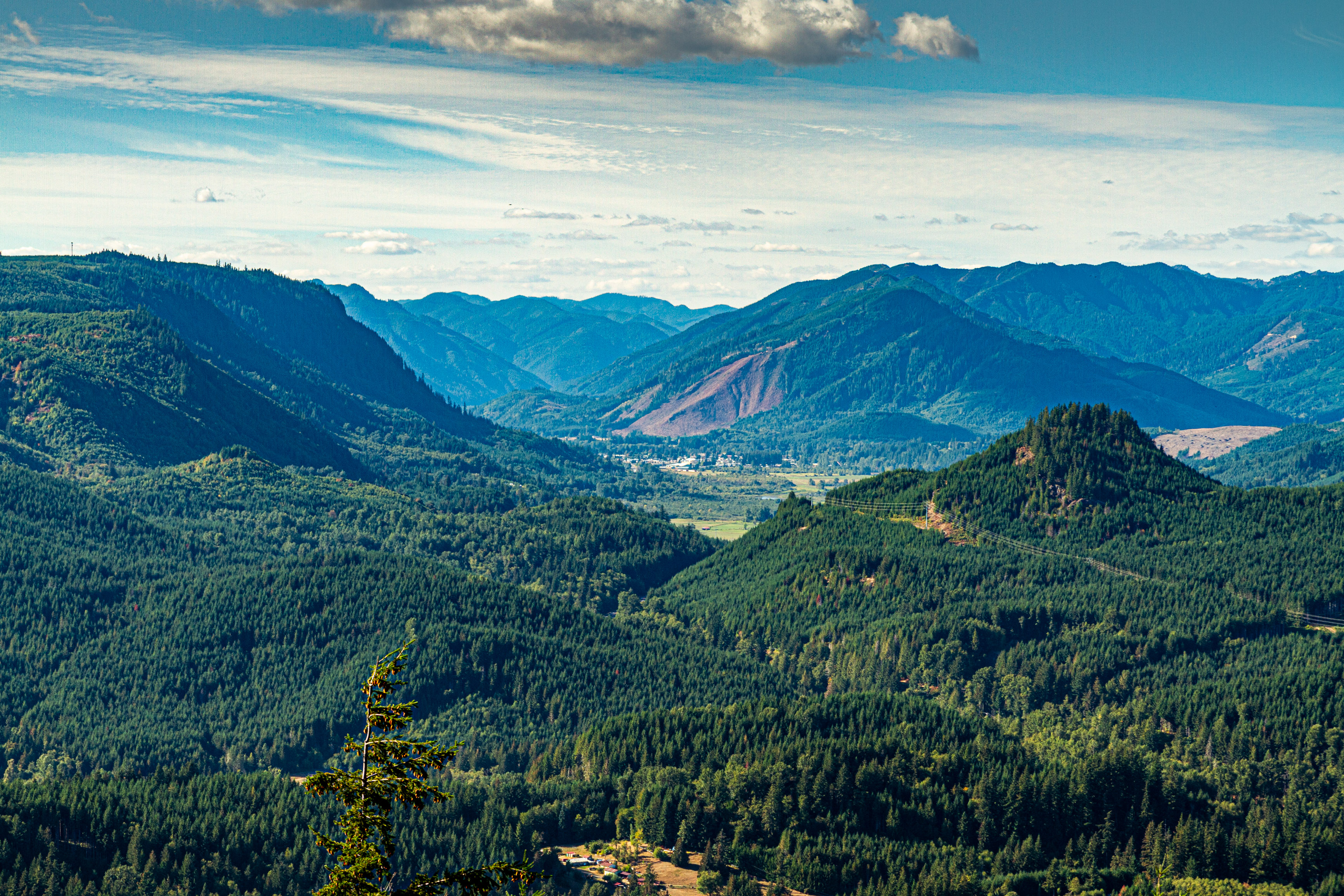
Morton as seen from Dog Mountain

According to the United States Census Bureau, the city has a total area of 0.83 square miles (2.15 km^{2}), of which 0.82 square miles (2.12 km^{2}) is land and 0.01 square miles (0.03 km^{2}) is water.

Morton is located north of Riffe Lake in the western foothills of the Cascade Range near Mount Rainier National Park. The city is situated at the junction of U.S. Route 12 and State Route 7.

=== Climate ===
This region experiences warm (but not hot) and dry summers, with no average monthly temperatures above 71.6 °F (22.0 °C). According to the Köppen Climate Classification system, Morton has a warm-summer Mediterranean climate, abbreviated "Csb" on climate maps.

== Demographics ==
=== 2020 census ===
As of the 2020 census, Morton had a population of 1,036 and a median age of 50.8 years. 18.6% of residents were under the age of 18 and 28.3% were 65 years of age or older. For every 100 females there were 97.0 males, and for every 100 females age 18 and over there were 88.2 males age 18 and over.

0.0% of residents lived in urban areas, while 100.0% lived in rural areas.

There were 468 households in Morton, of which 25.0% had children under the age of 18 living in them. Of all households, 40.8% were married-couple households, 21.4% were households with a male householder and no spouse or partner present, and 29.1% were households with a female householder and no spouse or partner present. About 34.0% of households were made up of individuals and 16.9% had someone living alone who was 65 years of age or older.

There were 506 housing units, of which 7.5% were vacant. The homeowner vacancy rate was 2.5% and the rental vacancy rate was 2.6%.

Racial composition as of the 2020 census
Race	Number	Percent
White	913	88.1%
Black or African American	4	0.4%
American Indian and Alaska Native	14	1.4%
Asian	6	0.6%
Native Hawaiian and Other Pacific Islander	1	0.1%
Some other race	18	1.7%
Two or more races	80	7.7%
Hispanic or Latino (of any race)	69	6.7%

Historical population
Census	Pop.	Note	%±
1920	522		—
1930	461		−11.7%
1940	778		68.8%
1950	1,140		46.5%
1960	1,183		3.8%
1970	1,134		−4.1%
1980	1,264		11.5%
1990	1,130		−10.6%
2000	1,045		−7.5%
2010	1,126		7.8%
2020	1,036		−8.0%
U.S. Decennial Census; 2020 Census

=== 2010 census ===
According to the 2010 census, there were 1,126 people, 461 households, and 283 families residing in the city. The population density was 1,373.2 inhabitants per square mile (530.2/km^{2}). There were 535 housing units at an average density of 652.4 per square mile (251.9/km^{2}). The racial makeup of the city was 94.2% White, 0.5% African American, 1.2% Native American, 0.6% Asian, 1.8% from other races, and 1.6% from two or more races. Hispanic or Latino of any race were 2.9% of the population.

There were 461 households, of which 26.2% had children under the age of 18 living with them, 43.4% were married couples living together, 11.3% had a female householder with no husband present, 6.7% had a male householder with no wife present, and 38.6% were non-families. 29.9% of all households were made up of individuals, and 17.3% had someone living alone who was 65 years of age or older. The average household size was 2.31 and the average family size was 2.83.

The city had a median age of 46.3 years. Among the population, 20.3% were under 18 years old, 8.2% were between 18 and 24, 19.5% were aged 25 to 44, 25.8% were between 45 and 64, and 26.2% were 65 years old or older. The gender distribution was 48.1% male and 51.9% female.

== Economy ==
Historic sources of revenue in the early days of Morton included logging, harvesting of cascara bark, and mining for cinnabar (mercury ore) in local mines. Morton was once known as the "tie mill capital of the world" in the 1950s. The longest railroad tie dock in the world ran along the railroad tracks east of Morton.

Timber processing and logging are a large component of Morton's economy though the community suffered hardships during the loss of timber production due to environmental laws enacted in the late 20th century. As of 2024, there are two lumber mills in the town.

== Arts and culture ==
=== Charitable organizations ===
Morton's downtown arts center is supported by the Fire Mountain Arts Council (FMAC), a non-profit formally incorporated in 2003. The group purchased the Roxy Theater and managed and found funding for the venue's restoration efforts that was completed in 2024. The FMAC also manages an art gallery and the Tiller Arts and Events Center in Morton.

=== Festivals and events ===
The Morton Loggers' Jubilee is a weekend celebration of the city's history of logging, usually held in August. Due to a lack of permanent records, the actual year the jubilee began is unknown, however there are reports of a beginning timeline of 1937 or 1938. The event has been a tradition since the 1940s and is proclaimed as the "granddaddy of all logging shows". Highlights include the coronation of a Jubilee Queen, lawnmower and bed racing, and competitive logging contests, which continues the original practice of the jubilee to be a "friendly competition between loggers". A parade, flea market, live music, and street dance performances round out the festivities. In her first homecoming show in Morton, Brandy Clark performed during the 75th anniversary of the event in 2017.

=== Historic buildings and sites ===
The downtown district is home to the Roxy Theater, first opened in 1938; the first film shown was Thin Ice, starring figure skater Sonja Henie. (Note: Although sourcing in the 2000s mentions either 1925 or 1937 as the year the Roxy was opened, the reference listed specifically reports that the theater opened for the first time in March 1938.) The movie house was previously the site of another venue known as the Arcade Theater. Having been dormant since 1980, the site was heavily restored beginning in the early 2000s and finished by 2006. The Roxy was fully opened for films and theater productions the following year. A further remodeling effort began during the COVID-19 pandemic, which included an addition to the building used as a backstage, and was completed in 2024. The theater holds live theatrical performances and film viewings. The Roxy is also home to an art gallery.

Visitors to the city are welcomed with a wooden sculpture of a lumberjack, given the title "Big Ole", signifying the importance of the city's timber history to the community. The first Big Ole was carved in 1983 but a new artwork was commissioned after the base of the original statue rotted. A replication of Big Ole was completed in May 2025 and placed at Jubilee Arena. The 2025 Big Ole, a cedar log carved by chainsaw to replicate the first sculpture, was moved to the intersection of Second Street and Westlake Avenue, the welcome site of the original statue, in January 2026; the inaugural artwork was placed at the arena.

== Parks and recreation ==
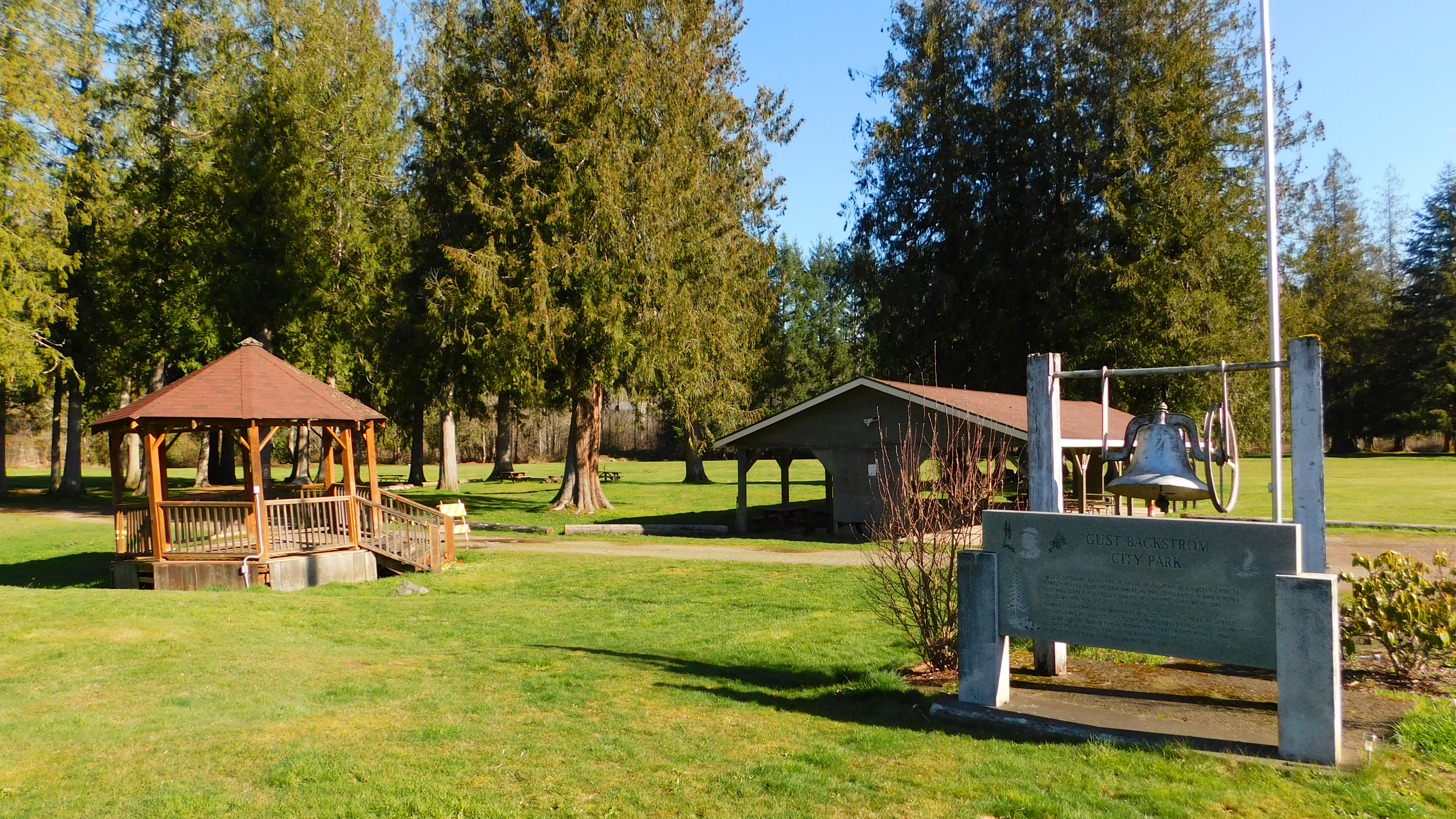
Gust Backstrom Park, 2026

Located on Morton's east side lies Jubilee Park and the Morton Loggers’ Jubilee Arena, home of the Loggers Jubilee. A renovation of the park and arena began in 2024 under volunteer efforts. In 2025, vandalism, along with the theft of benches, bleachers, and building materials, hampered the completion of the project. The city's original Big Ole statue was placed at the arena in January 2026.

Bordering the Tilton River is Gust Backstrom (City) Park, often home to the city's farmer's market and was the location of the Old Settlers Museum. The grounds, in 1896, were home to the first schoolhouse built in the town. The park is used by the Washington Department of Fish and Wildlife (WDFW) to deliver migrating Chinook salmon, circumventing the dams on the Cowlitz River. Named after August Backstrom, a Swedish immigrant and long-serving public servant in Morton, he donated the land to the city before his death in 1972. The site contains a cabin for a park caretaker, who acts as an overseer of the site and is a host to campers throughout the year.

== Politics ==
Presidential Elections Results
Year	Republican	Democratic	Third parties
2008	53.5% 271	45.2% 229	1.4% 7
2012	53.0% 224	45.6% 193	1.4% 6
2016	66.4% 288	26.3% 114	7.4% 32
2020	69.0% 288	29.0% 114	2.0% 12
2024	70.4% 436	26.3% 163	3.2% 20

The 2020 election included nine votes for candidates of the Libertarian Party.. In the 2024 election, thirteen votes were tallied for Robert F. Kennedy Jr..

== Education ==
Morton is home to two schools, Morton Elementary and Morton Junior-Senior High.

Centralia College East (CCE) is located in Morton. Known originally as Centralia College East County Center, the satellite campus began in 1983 and was originally located in a classroom at Morton High School. A building was constructed for the center and was completed in 1997. Situated next to the high school, the institution relocated in August and was renamed to its present-day title. The college partners with the Morton School District to produce a musical every two years. The event began in 1986 and funds raised from the productions provide scholarships for high school students in the city, as well as graduates in Mossyrock and White Pass.

The high school's athletics programs were merged with neighboring White Pass High School from 2010 to 2016. The Morton-White Pass boy's high school basketball team won back-to-back state championships in 2014 and 2015. Both titles were achieved during undefeated seasons.

== Infrastructure ==
=== Healthcare ===
Morton and East Lewis County residents are served by Arbor Health–Morton Hospital. Before 2019, the healthcare center was known as Morton General Hospital. The hospital opened in 1937 under ownership of Dr. C.B. Ritchie and contained 11 beds; the first nurse, Gladys Howlett, prepared food and provided clean laundry. The site expanded in 1952 and became a public healthcare campus in 1978 after the creation of a hospital district. Additional expansion occurred in 1992 with the construction of a long term care building, absorbed later for use as a hospital wing. The campus was overhauled with a new hospital building that opened in 2007, containing rooms for acute care and other modern medical building amenities.

=== Transportation ===
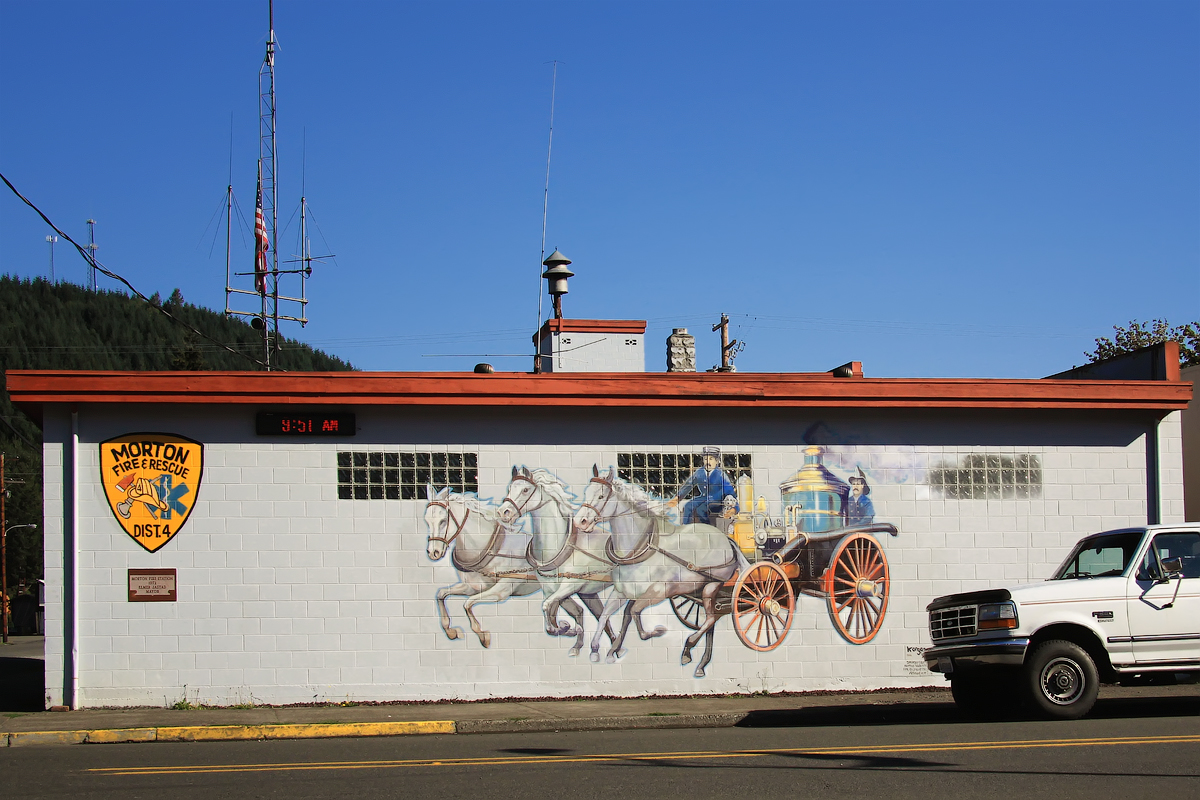
Fire station in Morton

The community is among eight locations that are part of an EV installation project on the White Pass Scenic Byway. The program will stretch from the White Pass Ski Area to Chehalis and is run in partnership with Lewis County PUD, Twin Transit, state government agencies, and local community efforts. The venture began in 2023 from two grants totaling over $1.8 million.

In 2023, Lewis County Transit began offering weekday, direct-route service from Centralia's Mellen Street e-Transit Station to the Morton Energy Station. The route, given the moniker "Brown Line", allows options for commuters to connect to other transit services in western Washington, such as Intercity Transit, RiverCities Transit, and the Cowlitz Tribal transportation system.

==== Strom Field Airport ====
Strom Field Airport is a single-runway municipal airfield located immediately southeast of the downtown core. Named after Stan T. Strom, a local devotee of aviation, the 10-acre (4.0 ha) airport was constructed between 1964 and 1965. The airstrip is 1,810 feet (551.7 m) in length and is 40 feet (12.2 m) wide. The airport was reported to be home to six aircraft and generated a revenue of over $28,000 in a 2010 economic impact analysis. In March 2010, a pilot of a Cirrus SR22 died during a crash when the aircraft, approximately 2.5 miles (4.0 km) from the airport, clipped trees during an attempted emergency landing due to power loss to an engine.

== Notable people ==
- Bill Bryant, Seattle Port Commissioner
- Brandy Clark, singer/songwriter for many Nashville recording artists
- Roger "Buzz" Osborne, singer/songwriter/guitarist for the rock band Melvins
- T.A. Peterman, founder of Peterbilt Motors Company
