= Glenoma, Washington =

Unincorporated community in Washington, United States

- Unincorporated community
- Location within Washington (state) Location within the United States
- Coordinates: 46°30′52″N 122°09′36″W
- Country: United States
- State: Washington
- County: Lewis
- Elevation: 820 ft (250 m)
- Time zone: UTC-8 (Pacific (PST))
  - Summer (DST): UTC-7 (PDT)
- ZIP Code: 98336
- Area code(s): 360, 564

Glenoma is an unincorporated community in Lewis County located off U.S. Route 12, between the towns of Morton and Randle. The area is northeast of Riffe Lake.

== History ==
Glenoma was originally named Vern and briefly as Verndale. The area was later renamed by Beverly Coiner, deriving the moniker by combining glen, meaning "valley", and oma, from the Hebrew word for "a measure of grain"; the name was construed to mean "fruitful valley".

The first covered swimming pool in Lewis County opened in Glenoma in 1961.

The community was nicknamed “Little Kentucky”, as many settlers in the area came from the Appalachian South.

== Climate ==
According to the Köppen Climate Classification system, Glenoma has a warm-summer Mediterranean climate, abbreviated "Csb" on climate maps.

Climate data for Glenoma
| Month | Jan | Feb | Mar | Apr | May | Jun | Jul | Aug | Sep | Oct | Nov | Dec | Year |
|---|---|---|---|---|---|---|---|---|---|---|---|---|---|
| Mean daily maximum °F (°C) | 44.9 (7.2) | 49.9 (9.9) | 53.6 (12.0) | 58.6 (14.8) | 65.3 (18.5) | 71 (22) | 77.1 (25.1) | 77.9 (25.5) | 72.4 (22.4) | 62.1 (16.7) | 51.0 (10.6) | 45.1 (7.3) | 60.7 (15.9) |
| Mean daily minimum °F (°C) | 31 (−1) | 32.2 (0.1) | 34.3 (1.3) | 37 (3) | 42.3 (5.7) | 47 (8) | 49.8 (9.9) | 49 (9) | 44.8 (7.1) | 38.3 (3.5) | 34.9 (1.6) | 31.5 (−0.3) | 39.3 (4.1) |
| Average precipitation inches (mm) | 10.00 (254) | 6.96 (177) | 6.42 (163) | 5.42 (138) | 3.82 (97) | 2.98 (76) | 1.18 (30) | 1.41 (36) | 3.25 (83) | 5.14 (131) | 9.51 (242) | 10.08 (256) | 66.17 (1,681) |
| Average snowfall inches (cm) | 7.7 (20) | 3.5 (8.9) | 1.0 (2.5) | 0.3 (0.76) | 0 (0) | 0 (0) | 0 (0) | 0 (0) | 0 (0) | 0 (0) | 1.3 (3.3) | 3.2 (8.1) | 16.9 (43) |

== Parks and recreation ==
The community is located north of several recreation areas, including Riffe Lake, Taidnapam Park, and Cowlitz Falls Park which is located on the Cispus River near its junction to the reservoir, Lake Scanewa. A 34-acre (14 ha) recreation area, known as Frost Creek Park, was first begun in the mid-1970s and was renamed Glenoma County (Community) Park.

== Education ==
Students in the town are served by the White Pass School District.

The Glenoma Elementary school was built in the 1920s. (Note: There are multiple reports recording 1923, 1929, or 1932 as to year the building was constructed. The building is reliably reported as burning down and being rebuilt in 1932.) It was rebuilt after a fire in 1932 and razed in 2011 after it had been closed due to low enrollment. Elementary students in the area began attending Randle Elementary School in 2004.
