= La Laguna, Arizona =

Lost ghost town in Yuma County, Arizona

Coordinates: 32°49′07″N 114°29′19″W

La Laguna was a gold mining town in New Mexico Territory, now Yuma County, Arizona. It was in existence for a short time from 1860 to 1862. The town was a steamboat landing 20 miles above Yuma, Arizona on the Colorado River. It had a few merchants and a ferry across the Colorado River that served placer miners in the vicinity. When the La Paz gold rush began, La Laguna began to decline and it was soon replaced by Castle Dome Landing, 15 miles to the north, following the discovery of gold in the Castle Dome Mountains. It remained for a time as the site of a store and a ranch, belonging to Jose Redondo, one of the first to mine gold at La Paz.

The site of La Laguna now lies beneath Mittry Lake.

== See also ==
- List of ghost towns in Arizona
