= Castle Dome (butte) =

Landform in Yuma County, Arizona

- Location within Arizona

Highest point
- Elevation: 3,780 feet (1,152 m)
- Prominence: 2,088 ft (636 m)
- Coordinates: 33°05′04″N 114°08′36″W

Geography
- Location: Yuma, Arizona
- Topo map: USGS Castle Dome Peak

Castle Dome, or Castle Dome Peak is a prominent butte and high point of the Castle Dome Mountains northeast of Yuma, Arizona, in the northwestern Sonoran Desert.

The butte lies approximately 22 miles (35 km) east of the historical Castle Dome Landing on the Colorado River (site submerged by the Imperial Reservoir). It is located above and east of US Route 95 and the Castle Dome mining district. Castle Dome is noteworthy for its recreational use for day hiking. It is also often coated in winter or spring snowstorms as a white landform, with its loss of white being determined by season and duration of storm temperatures. Castle Dome's height is 3,791 feet (1,155 m).

== Mining and minerals ==
Some noteworthy minerals from the Castle Dome Mountains region are vanadinite, wulfenite, baryte, and fluorite.

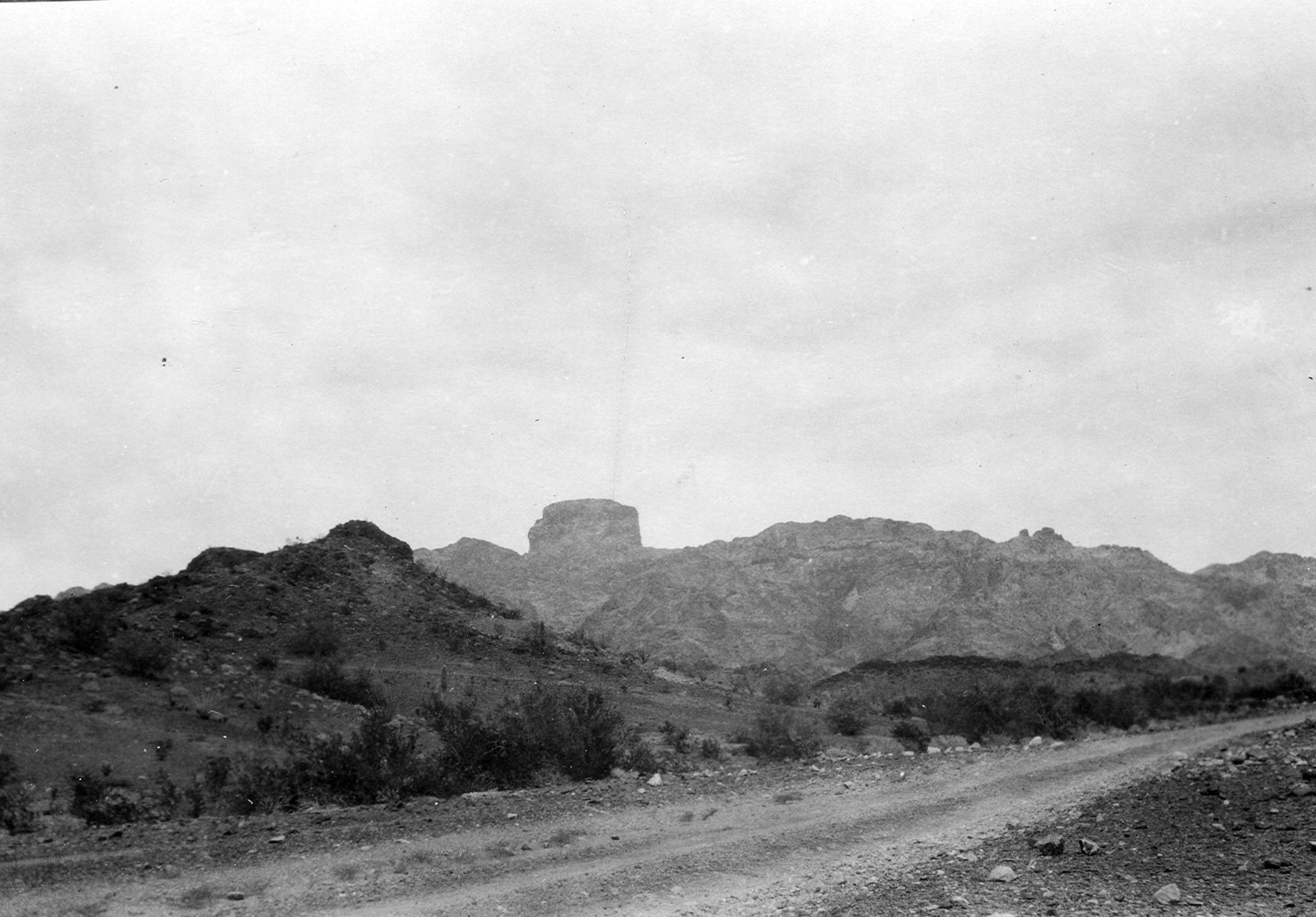
Castle Dome viewed from Castle Dome, Arizona, October 11, 1926.

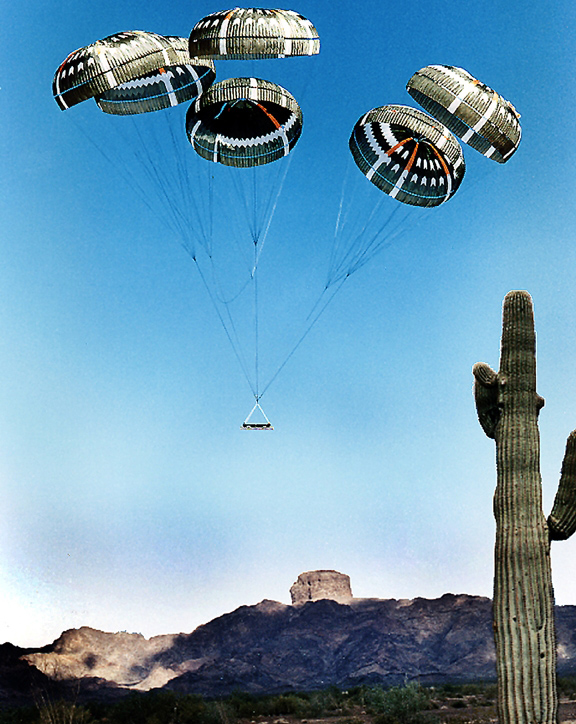
Airdrop on the Yuma Proving Ground

== Trails and unimproved road trails ==
Some of the local trails are: King Valley Road, McPherson Pass Trail, Big Eye Wash Trail, Castle Dome Mountains, and Kofa Queen Canyon Trail.

== See also ==
- Castle Dome Landing, Arizona
- Castle Dome Mountains
