= Awalt =

Awalt may refer to:

- Awalt, Tennessee, a ghost town in Franklin County
- Rob Awalt, former professional American football player
