= Nesika, Washington =

Nesika
- Flooded town
- Location within Washington (state)
- Coordinates: 46°28′26″N 122°17′21″W
- Abandoned: 1968

Nesika was an unincorporated town in Lewis County, Washington, southeast of Mossyrock. Following the completion of Mossyrock Dam in 1968, it became a flooded town.

== Etymology ==
The name of the town was chosen by Mrs. J. T. Chilcoat, an early settler, who named it after the Chinook Jargon word for "we, our, ours, us".

== History ==
The Riffe Valley was primarily inhabited by the Cowlitz people prior to European colonization. The future site of Nesika was home to the Sw:ktsw'ktɫa'ma band of Upper Cowlitz people, an Ichishkiin (Sahaptin) speaking group who are now primarily enrolled in the Confederated Tribes and Bands of the Yakama Nation. Nesika was known for a balancing rock landmark located off Highway 5.

Following the arrival of white settlers in the late nineteenth century, including the Chilcoat family, the town was established near the center of the Riffe Valley on the Cowlitz River. The settlements in the Riffe Valley were primarily agricultural. The town's post office was constructed in April 1898. The family of Harry R. Truman, a noted prospector and bootlegger killed in the 1980 eruption of Mount St. Helens settled in Nesika in 1907. In 1914, the town was connected over the Cowlitz River to Riffe via the 848 foot (258 metres)-long Cowlitz Bridge. The bridge faced issues as floods changed the course of the Cowlitz River and subsequently damaged the span multiple times. The Nesika post office was disestablished in July 1934.

=== Flooding of Nesika ===
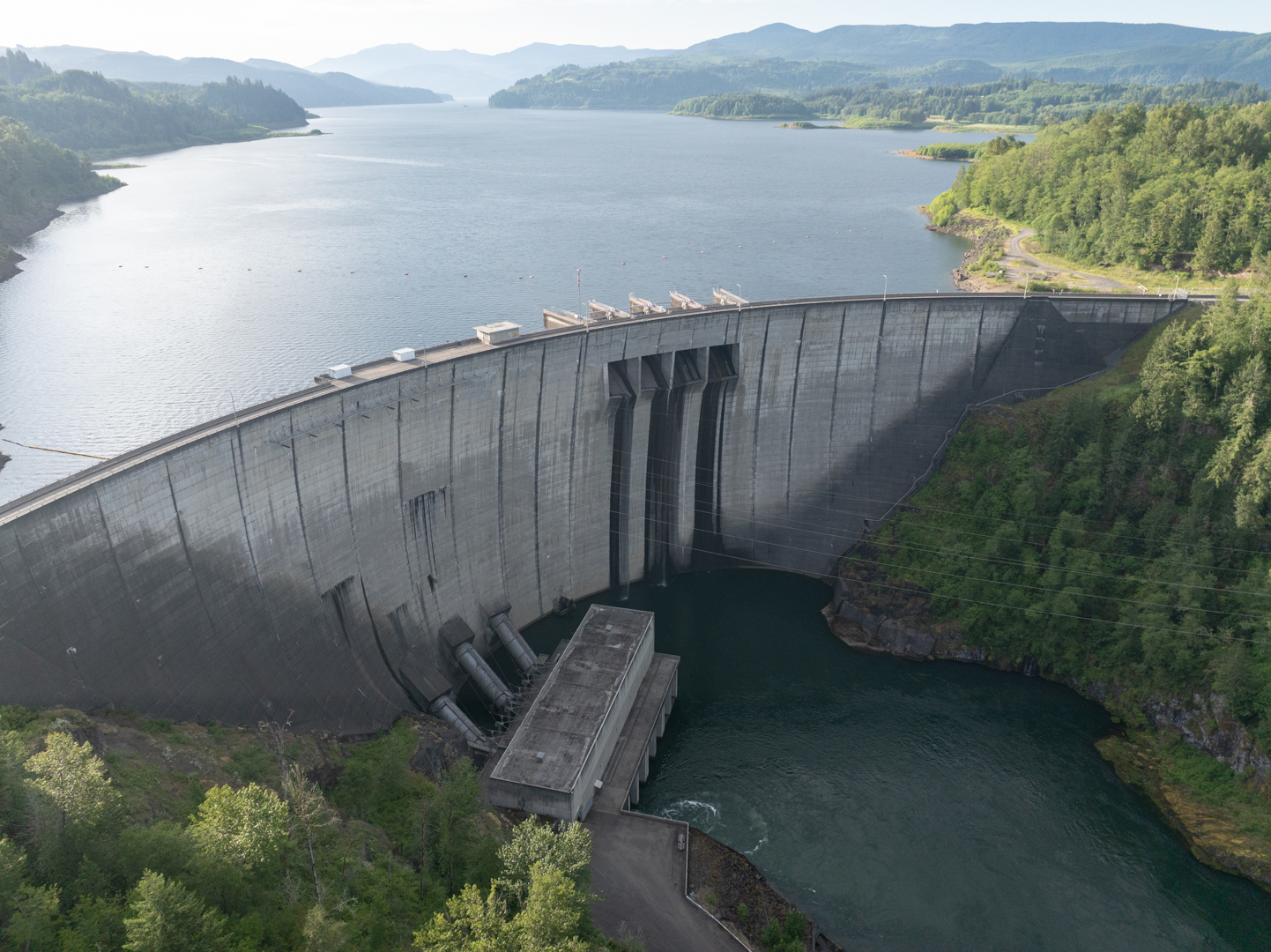
Mossyrock Dam and Riffe Lake, under which the remains of Nesika are submerged

Discussion over damming the Cowlitz River to generate hydroelectric power began in the 1940s, with the eminent domain purchase of the required land, including the town of Nesika, in 1963. In 1965, construction began on the Mossyrock Dam, which was completed in 1968. The remnants of the town were inundated, alongside the two other towns in the Riffe Valley, Kosmos and Riffe. The Cowlitz Bridge remained intact until November 1967, a few months ahead of its scheduled demolition when the new reservoir was slated to fill the valley. The creosote planking was accidentally set ablaze by workers using cutting torches. The fire destroyed 200 feet (61 m) of the bridge, which was permanently closed and later salvaged.

The town of Nesika remains submerged under Riffe Lake, the reservoir created by the hydroelectric dam. Interpretive signage about the town and its sister communities has been erected at the Riffe Lake overlook. Remnants of Nesika and the other Riffe Valley settlements are visible when the water levels of the dam's reservoir reach low levels.

== See also ==
- List of flooded towns in the United States
- List of Chinook Jargon place names
