= Oscarville, Georgia =

Underwater ghost town and historical Black community in the U.S. state of Georgia

Location of Forsyth County within the state of Georgia

Oscarville is a ghost town in Forsyth County, Georgia. Oscarville, a majority-Black town, is most famous for being a central location in a series of violent crimes and racially motivated riots that happened in 1912, driving away most of the Black residents in Forsyth County. In 1950, the remnants of the town were flooded during the construction of Lake Lanier. The site of Oscarville was located in northeastern Forsyth County, close to the border with Hall County.

== History ==
Oscarville was formed in the 1800s during the post-war Reconstruction. Oscarville was an agricultural community, and for most of its history it was reported to be prosperous. Though not all residents of Oscarville were Black, a large number were, and many of those residents had achieved higher economic growth than other Black communities of the time. Many of Oscarville's Black residents had been freed from slavery after fighting in the American Civil War. In 1911, Oscarville had approximately 1,100 residents, 58 of whom (5.27%) owned land. A quarter of all black households in Forsyth owned actual property. Of the 210 Black households listed on the 1910 census, 40 owned properties and 170 rented. Between 1910 and 1912, only a third of that population still owned their property. While some households continued to own property, two-thirds of 1910 property owners rented after white residents expelled them from the county. 109 residents rented farms, and many more worked as craftsmen in nearby towns such as Cumming. Many residents worked as hands in the cotton fields. Oscarville residents were also especially noted for their skill in raising poultry.

== 1912 racial conflict ==
In the months preceding the 1912 conflicts, racial tensions in the area still remained high from the 1906 Atlanta race riot. In 1912, several White farmers in the area were under economic stress, which they blamed on Black landowners. Several months prior to the events at Oscarville, a dispute between a Black boy and a White girl at a peach orchard in nearby Plainville had turned into an attempted lynching of several Black men. Black residents of Plainville resisted, and the situation escalated into a shootout which resulted in the death of the White sheriff of Plainville.

Information about the 1912 conflicts can at times be conflicting or hard to find, due to a lack of available records. There are no available arrest records for several of the events involved in the conflict, including the beating of Grant Smith, the lynching of Rob Edwards, or any of the following "Night Rider" attacks. The Forsyth County newspaper was founded in 1908, but has no available archives before 1917.

=== Ellen Grice incident ===
On 5 September 1912, a 22-year-old White woman named Ellen Grice made an allegation that two Black men had attempted to rape her. Grice claimed that she woke in her bed to find a Black man, but they were scared off by the arrival of Grice's mother. Five black men were arrested by the Forsyth County sheriff in connection with the case. News of the alleged attack and resulting arrests unsettled the surrounding black communities. A local Black preacher, Grant Smith, made an appeal to the sheriff that the five Black men who had been detained be released, claiming that there was not enough evidence in the case to charge all five men. Smith also claimed that Ellen Grice may have been in a consensual relationship with one of the suspects, and upon being caught, reported a crime, a defense known as "the old threadbare lie" and known to be used by White women caught in relationships with Black men. Smith's comments on the Grice case enraged the local White community, and a mob surrounded Smith on the steps of the courthouse, and Smith was beaten by the mob and horse-whipped. Smith sustained life-threatening injuries, but survived the attack.

=== Rape and murder of Mae Crow ===
On the morning of 13 September 1912, a White woman named Mae Crow was found unresponsive in the woods outside Oscarville. Crow, who was either 18 or 19 years old and was a resident of the nearby community of Big Creek, had been raped and bludgeoned in the head with a rock, fracturing her skull. Crow was significantly battered and half-undressed when her body was found hidden under a pile of leaves. Although Crow was alive at the time of her discovery, she was unconscious and hardly breathing. Crow remained in a coma for two weeks before dying from her injuries. It is widely believed that none of the individuals arrested for her attack were actually involved. Due to the length of time elapsed and lack of living witnesses, it is unlikely that an actual culprit will ever be discovered.

At the time, a common response to violent attacks committed against White women was to search nearby Black communities for the alleged perpetrator. Searchers at the scene where Mae Crow's body was found had reported the discovery of a small pocket mirror. It was alleged that the pocket mirror belonged to Ernest Knox, a 16-year-old Black resident of nearby Cumming. Knox was arrested at his house and subject to a mock lynching, and a confession was coerced out of him. News of Crow's rape and Knox's subsequent arrest continued to agitate the already upset White community, leading to the formation of a mob outside the jailhouse where Knox was detained. In order to keep Knox alive until his trial, Knox was covertly transported out the back door of the jail to be detained at a different jail in Atlanta.

Following the arrest of Knox, four other Black residents were arrested as accomplices to the crime. The alleged accomplices were Knox's cousin Oscar Daniel (age 18), Oscar Daniel's sister Jane Daniel (age 22), Jane Daniel's husband Rob Edwards (age 24), and another resident named Ed Collins. Rob Edwards, an Oscarville resident, was known as "Big Rob" for his distinctive large stature. While the accused were awaiting trial, a mob of approximately 2,000 White vigilantes formed outside the county courthouse holding the alleged accomplices. The deputy attempted to prevent the mob from storming the courthouse, but the sheriff had gone home earlier that evening, claiming that he had no idea of the growing mob. After gaining access to the cells, the mob beat Rob Edwards with crowbars and hung a noose around his neck. The mob then fatally shot Rob Edwards and dragged his body out of the jailhouse to the town square, where it was hung from a telephone pole, drawing large crowds. Additional bullets were also then fired into Edwards' remains by members of the crowd.

At trial, 18-year-old Oscar Daniel and 16-year-old Ernest Knox were found guilty of the rape and murder of Mae Crow. Jane Daniels was acquitted of her charges. The separate trials of Daniels and Knox both took place and concluded within a single day. Newt Morris, the judge overseeing the trials, was later at the forefront of the mob during the 1915 lynching of Leo Frank. Oscar Daniels and Ernest Knox were both sentenced to death by hanging, which was illegal under state law at the time. As public executions were illegal in Forsyth County at the time, Judge Morris ordered that the hangings take place behind a blind. The night before the executions, arsonists burned the blind down, leaving the gallows untouched. The hangings of Oscar Daniels and Ernest Knox drew large crowds of approximately 8,000 spectators. A piece of rope used in the hangings was kept in the minute book of court records until the 1912 violence received attention from civil rights protestors in 1987, around which time the rope went missing.

=== Attacks by Night Riders ===
Starting the day of Mae Crow's funeral, groups of White individuals calling themselves "Night Riders" carried out group attacks where Whites on horseback would use the cover of night to descend on the black communities of Forsyth County with the intention of inflicting property damage and injury for the purpose of expunging Forsyth County of all Black residents. Because of the short amount of time between the attacks on Ellen Grice and Mae Crow, White locals believed that a "Black insurrection" was causing a spree of rapes. In Oscarville, firebombs were thrown into the local church, which was a community hub for Oscarville, similarly to other communities at the time. Many of the Night Ridings involved arson. These attacks happened regularly for several months. Many residents of Oscarville died in these attacks while fleeing to the relative safety of nearby Gainesville, which was across the Chattahoochee River in Hall County.

In 1912, there were 1,098 Black residents in Forsyth County, amounting to 10% of the total population. Because of the danger and instability caused by the Night Riders, most of the Black residents of Forsyth County left Forsyth County during September and October 1912. Within a few years, 98% of the Black residents of Oscarville had either left Forsyth County or been killed for refusing to leave. Many of the fleeing residents settled just to the North in Hall County, where they would bring their poultry-rearing skills and lead to the growth of the poultry industry in Gainesville, while many others continued farther North as part of the Great Migration. The 1912 racial conflict at Forsyth County is not considered unusual as occurrence, as it is instead part of a noted pattern of violent incidents that took place in the United States between the 1860s and 1920s, wherein White communities would attempt to forcibly expel all Black residents from their communities. The 1912 racial conflict was one of multiple such incidents occurring in Northern Georgia at the time. However, the expulsions at Forsyth County are considered unusual for the level of success they achieved in removing the Black presence in local communities. For comparison, similar attempts in neighboring Hall County led to arrests within the first week, causing the movement to quickly peter out.

Because of the urgency of their situation, Black landowners attempting to leave often had no choice but to sell their land at prices far below what the land was worth and far below what they themselves had paid for the land. Other families were unable to sell their property before leaving, thus receiving no compensation. Many times, after a Black family fled, any property they had left behind would be destroyed and any livestock killed. White residents would later take advantage of adverse possession laws, intended to make better use of abandoned land, to take possession of land left behind by Black residents without having to pay the previous owners for it. In 1987, following a civil rights march, an inquiry was launched into the possibility of repatriation for land taken from Black residents without due legal process. However, due to the amount of times the land has been sold and passed down since its seizure, the County did not repatriate any land, and any future repatriation is unlikely.

== Construction of Lake Lanier ==
In the decades following the 1912 expulsions, land that had formerly been part of Oscarville was gradually sold to the government. Growing demand for water in surrounding cities, such as Atlanta, led to the development of plans for a man-made reservoir. Plans for construction of the Buford Dam were approved in 1947. The dam, situated on the Chattahoochee River, would regulate flooding and lead to the formation of Lake Lanier. The remains of Oscarville were flooded in 1950 during the lake's construction. Named after Confederate veteran and poet Sidney Lanier, Lake Lanier was completed in 1956. Oscarville is supposedly one of multiple "drowned towns" beneath Lake Lanier.

Local legend alleges Lake Lanier to be haunted. One commonly claimed reason for the supposed haunting is the high number of drowning deaths, with over 500 deaths between the lake's formation and 2021. 200 deaths occurred between 1994 and 2020. Underwater debris such as trees and buildings contribute to this drowning rate. The abandoned structures at Oscarville were not demolished before being flooded, turning the structures into underwater hazards. Another commonly cited reason for the supposed haunting is that several cemeteries were not relocated before the flooding, and as of 2025 remain at the bottom of the lake.

== Later racial tensions ==
Following the 1912 expulsions, the borders of Forsyth County were enforced as White-only until as recently as the 1980s. Some White children growing up in Forsyth County were raised with the explanation that the White residents of Forsyth had driven out all the Black residents in order to protect the county's White women. In 2019, Forsyth County's population remained only 3.6% Black. Those who remained largely worked as sharecroppers and worked under harsh conditions, severely limited by Black Codes. As recently as 2022, efforts in Forsyth County to teach the story of Oscarville have led to resistance, criticizing the efforts as "critical race theory".

In January 1987, a civil rights march called the "Brotherhood March" took place in Forsyth county, led by Hosea Williams. Locals and other White counter-protestors are reported to have thrown rocks at the demonstrators. Oprah Winfrey, at the time still early in her television career, went to Forsyth County to cover the demonstrations. The civil rights demonstrations in the 1980s drew statewide attention to the past expulsions at Oscarville, prompting an inquiry at the county level into land repatriation. However, the inquiry did not result in the repatriation of any land.

== In popular culture ==
Today, Oscarville is locally famous in the communities surrounding Lake Lanier. Through word of mouth, stories of the town have evolved into a local legend of a haunted town beneath the lake, with even a few reports of supernatural sightings.

=== Books ===
A 2016 book, Blood at the Root, was published about the 1912 violence at Oscarville. The author, Patrick Philips, had grown up with White anti-segregationist parents as a White boy in a still-segregated Forsyth County.

=== Film and television ===
In 2022, filmmaker Bob Mackey began production on a television series called Oscarville: Below the Surface, a historical thriller centering on the 1912 expulsions. The series is a fictionalized account of the supernatural legends surrounding Oscarville and other legends of Lake Lanier.

A third-season episode of the television show Atlanta centered on the violence at Oscarville.

== See also ==
- List of flooded towns in the United States
- List of ghost towns in Georgia (U.S. state)
- Sundown town
