= Martinez Lake, Arizona =

CDP in Yuma County, Arizona

- CDP
- Location within the state of Arizona Martinez Lake (the United States)
- Coordinates: 32°59′11″N 114°27′57″W
- County: Yuma
- Established: 1958

Area
  - Total: 2.24 sq mi (5.79 km^{2})
  - Land: 1.53 sq mi (3.95 km^{2})
  - Water: 0.71 sq mi (1.84 km^{2})
- Elevation: 194 ft (59 m)

Population (2020)
  - Total: 94
  - Density: 62/sq mi (23.8/km^{2})
- Time zone: UTC-7 (MST)
- ZIP code: 85365
- Area code: 928
- FIPS code: 04-44830
- GNIS feature ID: 2582822

Martinez Lake is a census-designated place (CDP) in Yuma County, Arizona, United States, located on Martinez Lake. The population was 798 at the 2010 census. It was founded in 1958 as a fishing community. It remains primarily a vacation community.

== Geography ==
Imperial National Wildlife Refuge is located nearby.

== Demographics ==
Historical population
Census	Pop.	Note	%±
2010	798		—
2020	94		−88.2%
U.S. Decennial Census

As of the 2010 census, there were 798 people living in the CDP: 395 male and 403 female. 258 were 19 years old or younger, 116 were between ages 20–34, 130 were between the ages of 35 and 49, 195 were between 50 and 64, and the remaining 99 were aged 65 and above. The median age was 59.0 years.

The racial makeup of the CDP was 79.1% White, 3.9% Black or African American, 1.9% Asian, 4.1% Other, and 11.0% two or more races. 20.7% of the population were Hispanic or Latino of any race.

There were 313 households in the CDP, 206 family households (65.8%) and 107 non-family households (34.2%), with an average household size of 2.55. Of the family households, 187 were married couples living together, while there were 3 single fathers and 16 single mothers; the non-family households included 100 adults living alone: 63 male and 37 female.

The CDP contained 510 housing units, of which 313 were occupied and 197 were vacant.

== Education ==
It is in the Yuma Elementary School District and the Yuma Union High School District.

The zoned elementary and middle schools are James D. Price Elementary School (in Yuma Proving Ground) and Ron Watson Middle School. Gila Ridge High School is the zoned high school.
