= Kosmos, Washington =

- Flooded town
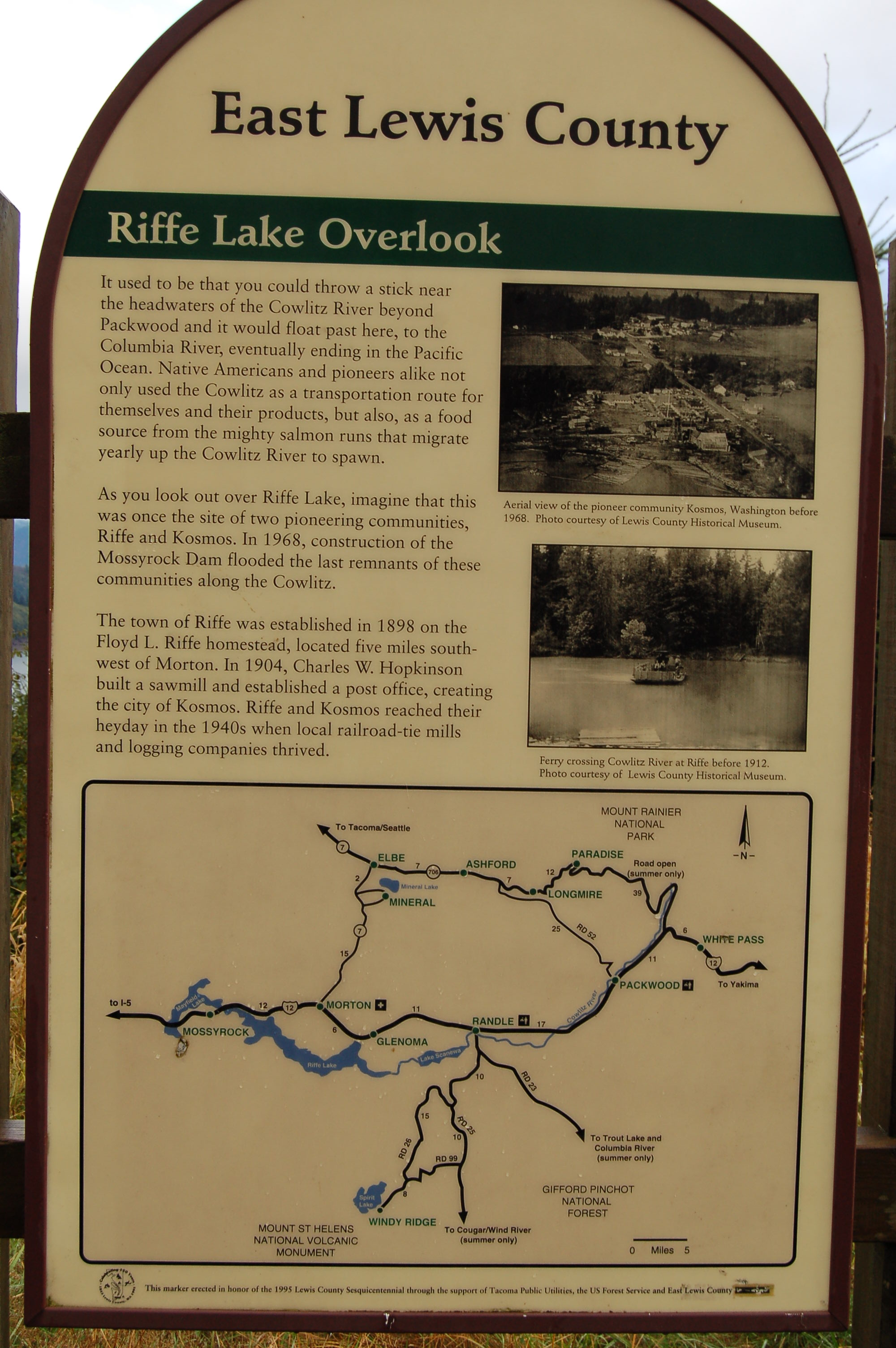
- White Pass Scenic Byway - Sign at Riffe Lake Overlook

- Location within Washington (state)
- Coordinates: 46°29′46″N 122°11′10″W
- Established: 1891
- Razed and flooded: 1968
- Named for: Greek term meaning "universe"
- GNIS feature ID: 1521766

Kosmos (CAUSE-muss) was an unincorporated community in Lewis County, Washington, southwest of Glenoma and is now considered a flooded town. Kosmos is named from a Greek term meaning "the world or universe as an embodiment of order and harmony".

== History ==
The town officially began in 1891 under the name, Fulton, after Homer Fulton, the first postmaster. The site changed its moniker to Kosmos in 1903, chosen by the wife of B. W. Coiner, a homesteader. The reason behind the name remains obscure.

The town's primary economy was based on logging and sawmills, with mining for mercury also a principal venture. The community was served by the Fulton Ferry before bridges were built to reach the area. A school district and schoolhouse were begun in 1913. At its most prosperous, Kosmos had a population between 500-600 people, two grocery stores, a post office, and a locomotive shop, among other amenities.

=== Flooding ===
Residents relocated from Kosmos, along with its neighboring communities of Neskia and Riffe, in advance of the completion of the Mossyrock Dam in 1968. Before the Cowlitz River rose behind the dam and formed Riffe Lake, contractors razed most structures, except for their foundations. Several bridges near the town were demolished, including Steffen Creek Bridge which was destroyed by experimental explosive testing under the direction of the U.S. Army Corps of Engineers. Periods of low water occasionally exposed remains of the town until 2017 when the lake's water level was dropped 30 feet, exposing the remains of the town since. The remains can be accessed at the Kosmos Wildlife Area Unit, part of the Cowlitz River Wildlife Area, and portions of concrete foundations, areas of logging camps, and remains of mills and timber factories are visible.
