= Castle Dome Mountains =

Landform in Yuma County, Arizona, US

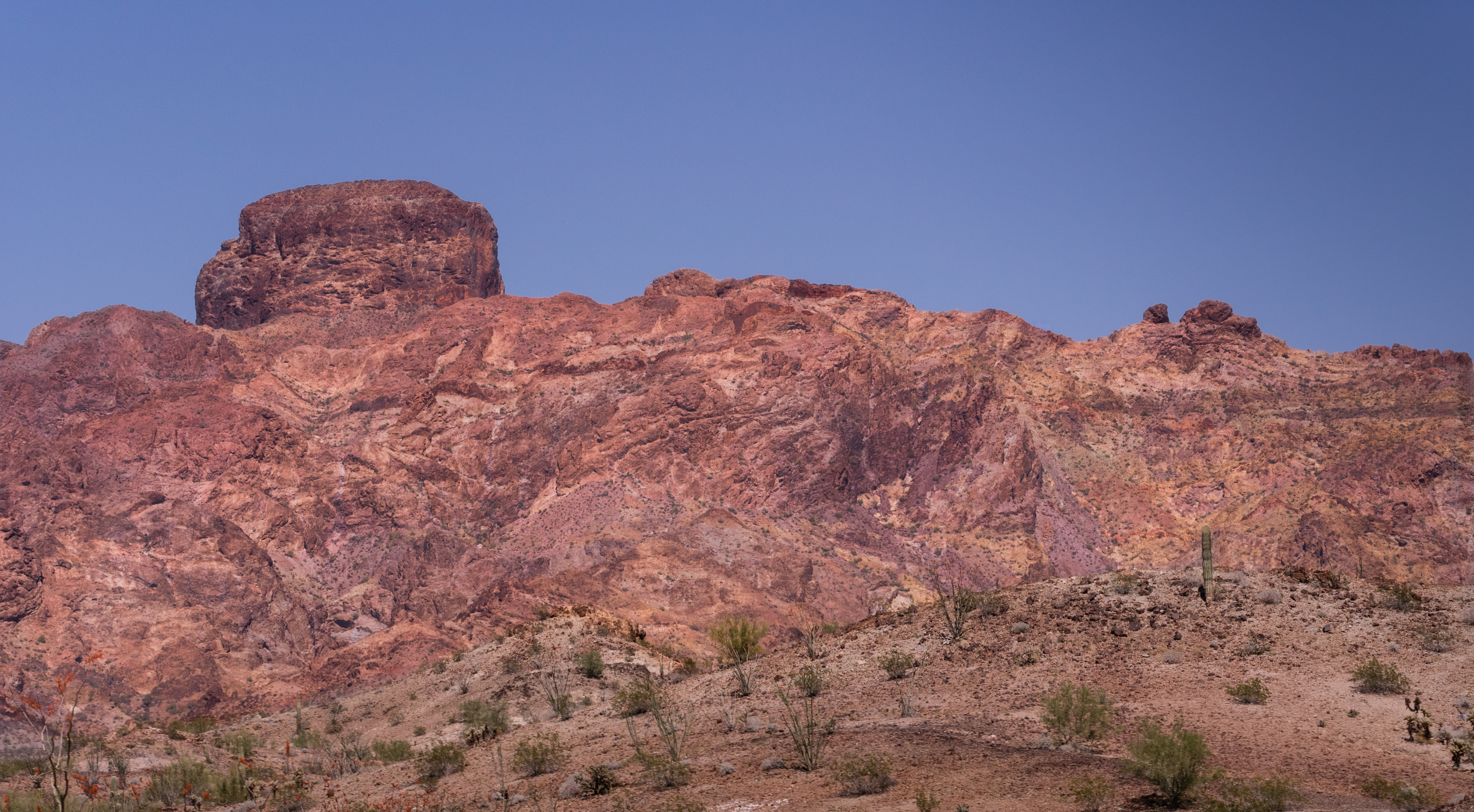
- Castle Dome Peak in the Castle Dome Mountains within Kofa National Wildlife Refuge.

Highest point
- Peak: Castle Dome Peak
- Elevation: 3,780 feet (1,152 m)
- Coordinates: 33°05′04″N 114°08′36″W

Geography
- Location within Arizona
- Country: United States
- State: Arizona

The Castle Dome Mountains (Tolkepaya Yavapai: Wi:hopuʼ) are a mountain range in Yuma County, Arizona, within the Kofa National Wildlife Refuge. Castle Dome Peak, the high point of the range, is a prominent butte and distinctive landmark. The peak is 3,780 feet (1,152 m) high, and is located at 33°05′04″N 114°08′36″W. Castle Dome was named by American soldiers at old Fort Yuma in the 1880s. Early Spanish explorers called the same peak Cabeza de Gigante, "Giant's Head."

== History ==
=== Mining ===
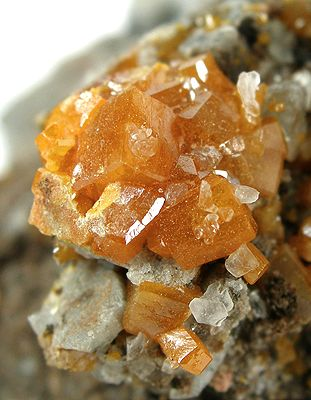
Wulfenite specimen from the old Hull Mine, Castle Dome mining district

The Castle Dome mining district is one of Yuma County's oldest and most productive mining locations. Its proximity to the Colorado River and relatively low rates of freight at the time permitted the mining of even low grades of ore which wouldn't have been profitable at other locations. In addition to silver and lead, the area is rich in numerous other minerals, including zinc, copper, gold, and many others. Total production from the Castle Dome mines included 10,697 short tons (9,704 t) of lead, 498,000 troy ounces (546,000 oz; 15,500,000 g) of silver, 38 short tons (34 t) of zinc, 36 short tons (33 t) of copper, 2,000 troy ounces (2,200 oz; 62,000 g) of gold, and 7,000 troy ounces (7,700 oz; 220,000 g) of placer gold production, mostly prior to 1900.

=== Settlements ===
The area was home to the town and mining camp of Castle Dome based around the Castle Dome Mine which first produced silver and later lead. The post office opened in 1875 and closed in 1876. Castle Dome ghost town is now a museum site, the Castle Dome Mines Museum, with twenty or so restored period buildings.

Castle Dome Landing was the port and supply point nearby on the Colorado River. The townsite is now submerged beneath the Imperial Dam reservoir.

== Mineral collecting ==
The Castle Dome mining district is a popular district for mineral collectors. The region is known for striking combinations of cerussite, fluorite, vanadinite, wulfenite, barite, and mimetite, as well as galenite and anglesite. The Hull Mine and Puzzler Mine in particular have produced atypical green vanadinite and mimetite as well as yellow-hued wulfenite.
