= Mittry Lake =

Lake in Yuma County, Arizona, US

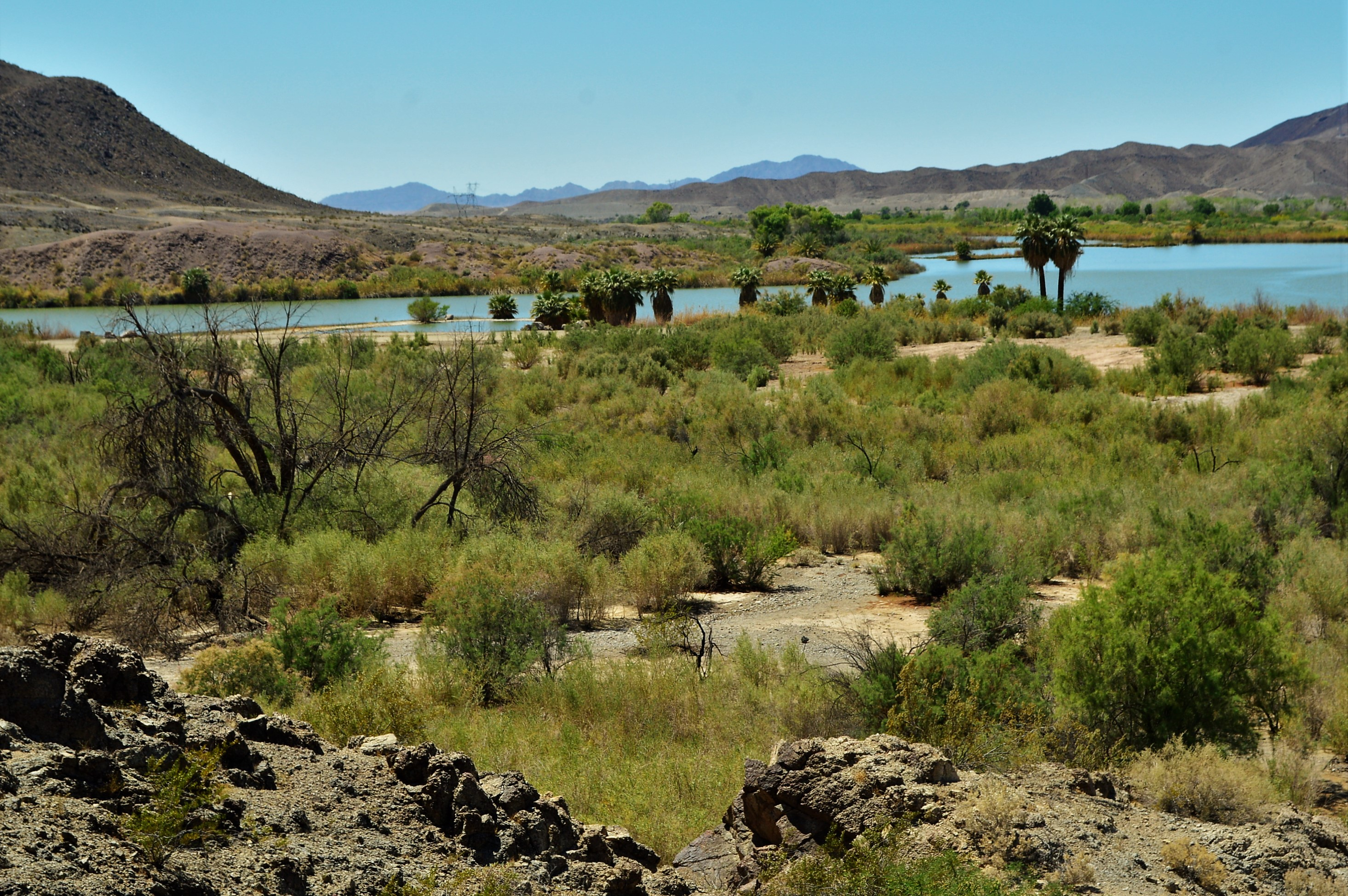

- Location within Arizona
- Location: Yuma County, Arizona
- Coordinates: 32°49′38″N 114°27′14″W
- Basin countries: United States
- Managing agency: Arizona Game and Fish Department and the Bureau of Land Management
- Surface area: 750 acres (300 ha)
- Average depth: 8 ft (2.4 m)
- Surface elevation: 185 ft (56 m)

Mittry Lake is located in the Mittry Lake Wildlife Area, just north of Yuma, Arizona, on the Lower Colorado River. It is located in between the upstream Imperial Dam and the downstream Laguna Dam. Mittry Lake comprises about 750 acres (300 ha), with much of the shoreline covered with cattails and bullrush. The lake has undergone rehabilitation work including marsh dredging, revegetation and fish habitat improvement, making it a great location for small game hunting and sport fishing. It is public land managed by the Arizona Game and Fish Department, the Bureau of Reclamation and the Bureau of Land Management, and available to the public for recreational purposes.

== La Laguna ==
La Laguna was a mining town that was in existence for a short time from 1860 to 1862. The town had a few merchants and a ferry across the Colorado River that served placer miners in the vicinity. When the La Paz gold rush began, La Laguna was abandoned. Its former site now lies beneath Mittry Lake.

== Fish species ==
- Largemouth Bass
- Crappie
- Bullhead catfish
- Catfish (Channel)
- Catfish (Flathead)
- Tilapia
- Redear Sunfish
- Green Sunfish
- Bluegill Sunfish
- Carp
- Bullfrogs

== See also ==
- List of lakes in Arizona
