= Mossyrock Dam =

Dam in Washington state

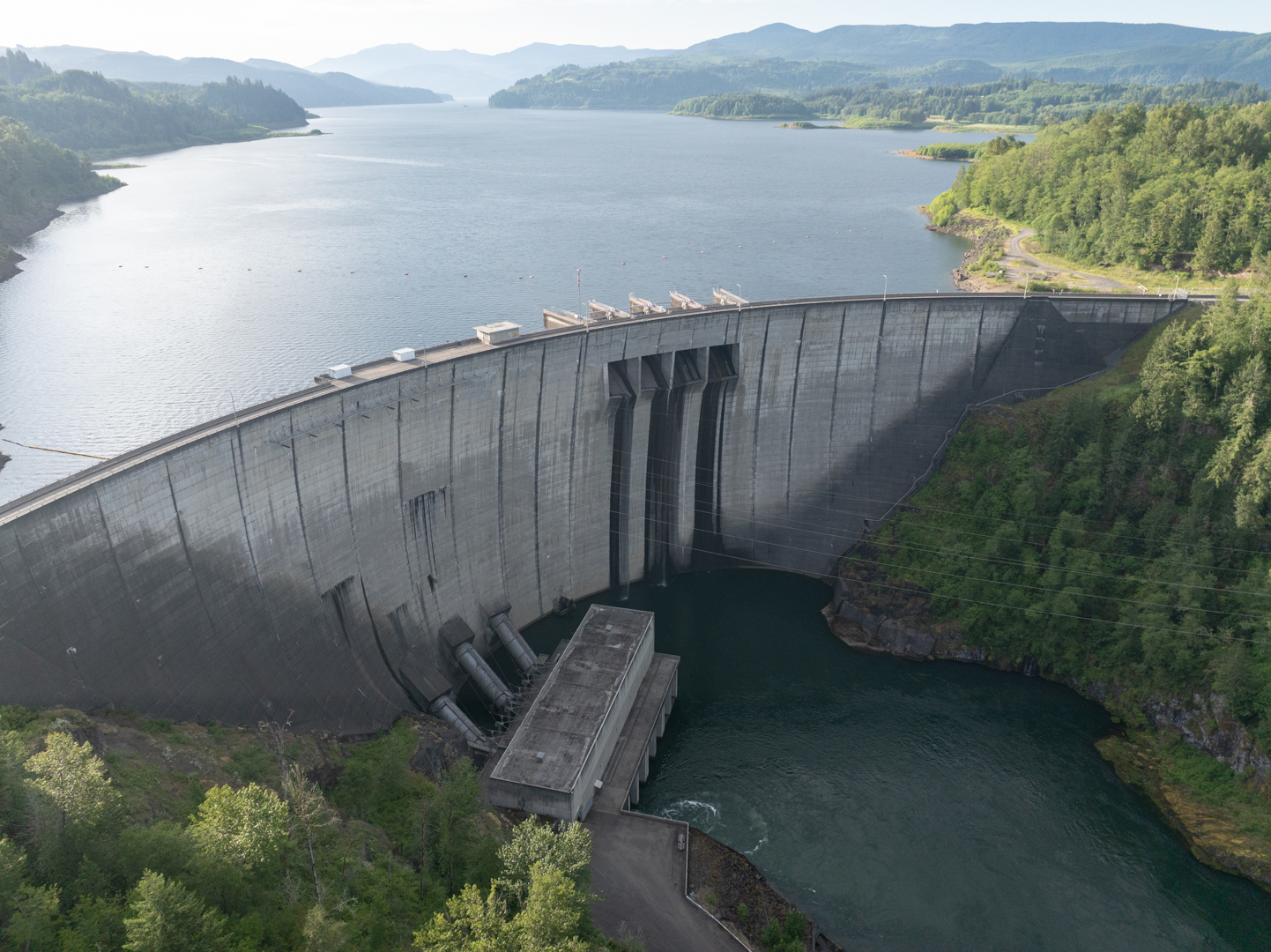
- Interactive map of Mossyrock Dam
- Location: Lewis County, Washington, U.S.
- Coordinates: 46°32′4″N 122°25′43″W
- Construction began: 1965; 61 years ago
- Opening date: 1968; 58 years ago
- Construction cost: $117,769,400
- Operator: Tacoma Power

Dam and spillways
- Type of dam: Concrete, arch-gravity
- Impounds: Cowlitz River
- Height (foundation): 606 feet (185 m)
- Height (thalweg): 365 feet (111 m)
- Length: 1,648 feet (502 m)
- Width (base): 115 feet (35 m)
- Spillway type: Service, gate-controlled

Reservoir
- Creates: Riffe Lake
- Total capacity: 1,685,000 acre-feet (2.08 km^{3})
- Catchment area: 1,042 square miles (2,700 km^{2})
- Surface area: 11,830 acres (4,790 ha)

Power Station
- Turbines: 1x 207 MW, 1x 175 MW
- Installed capacity: 382 MW
- Annual generation: 811.561 GWh

Mossyrock Dam is a concrete double-arch-gravity dam on the Cowlitz River near Mossyrock in Lewis County, Washington, United States. The reservoir created by the dam is called Riffe Lake. The primary purpose of the dam is hydroelectric production while flood control is a secondary function. The dam is the tallest in Washington state and its hydroelectric power station supplies 40% of Tacoma Power's electricity.

== History ==
Planning for the Mossyrock Dam began in the 1940s but opposition from local fishers and Washington State's Fish and Wildlife Department delayed construction. During World War II, the city of Tacoma, Washington, purchased its electricity from the Bonneville Power Administration and from Seattle, with costs of up to $1 million/year. To generate its own electricity, Tacoma City Light (now Tacoma Power) built several dams, including the Mossyrock Dam. Plans for the Mossyrock Dam were announced in 1948 but met stiff opposition. The Washington State Legislature enacted a fish sanctuary on the Cowlitz River that initially blocked the project. Tacoma City sued, with its suit being raised to the US Supreme Court a total of three times. After that, construction of the dam was approved. Construction began in 1965 and ended in 1968. On October 13, 1968, the dam's power plant generated its first electricity. Several towns were forced to evacuate ahead of the rising dam waters including Kosmos, Nesika, and Riffe.

Tacoma City Light originally proposed naming the facility the "Homer T. Bone Dam", in honor of Senator Homer Bone of Tacoma.

== Power plant ==
The Mossyrock Dam's power plant contains two Francis turbine hydroelectric generators, Unit #51 is rated at 210 MW and Unit #52 at 185 MW, or 395 MW total capacity. They are fed by two of the three installed penstocks ranging from 248 – 285 feet in overall length. The third penstock is presently unused, awaiting possible future installation of a third turbine.

=== Power plant upgrade ===
In 2006, GE Energy was selected to upgrade the two units. The $50 million project included replacing the turbines, stators, wicket gates and transformers. GE sold off their rebuild contract to Andritz AG, removing themselves from their contract. Installation of the first generator began in 2008; it began operation in 2009. Replacement of the second generator was completed in late 2010. The power plant upgrade increased the total capacity by 70 MW, with an expected overall energy conversion efficiency of near 95 percent.

== See also ==
- List of dams in the Columbia River watershed
