= Martinez Lake =

Lake in Yuma County, Arizona

- Location within Arizona Location within the United States
- Location: Yuma County, Arizona
- Coordinates: 32°58′59″N 114°28′34″W
- Primary inflows: Lower Colorado River
- Primary outflows: Lower Colorado River
- Basin countries: United States

Martinez Lake is a lake in the southwestern corner of the U.S. state of Arizona, about 60 miles (97 km) north of Yuma, Arizona, on the Lower Colorado River. The community of Martinez Lake, Arizona, is located on the lake.

== Fish species ==
- Largemouth bass
- Smallmouth bass
- Striped bass
- Crappie
- Bullhead catfish
- Channel catfish
- Flathead catfish
- Tilapia
- Redear sunfish
- Green sunfish
- Bluegill
- Carp
- American bullfrog

== General information ==
- Average depth: 1–10 ft (0.30–3.05 m)
- Elevation: 200 ft (61 m)
