= Castle Dome Landing, Arizona =

Ghost town in Yuma County, Arizona

- Ghost town
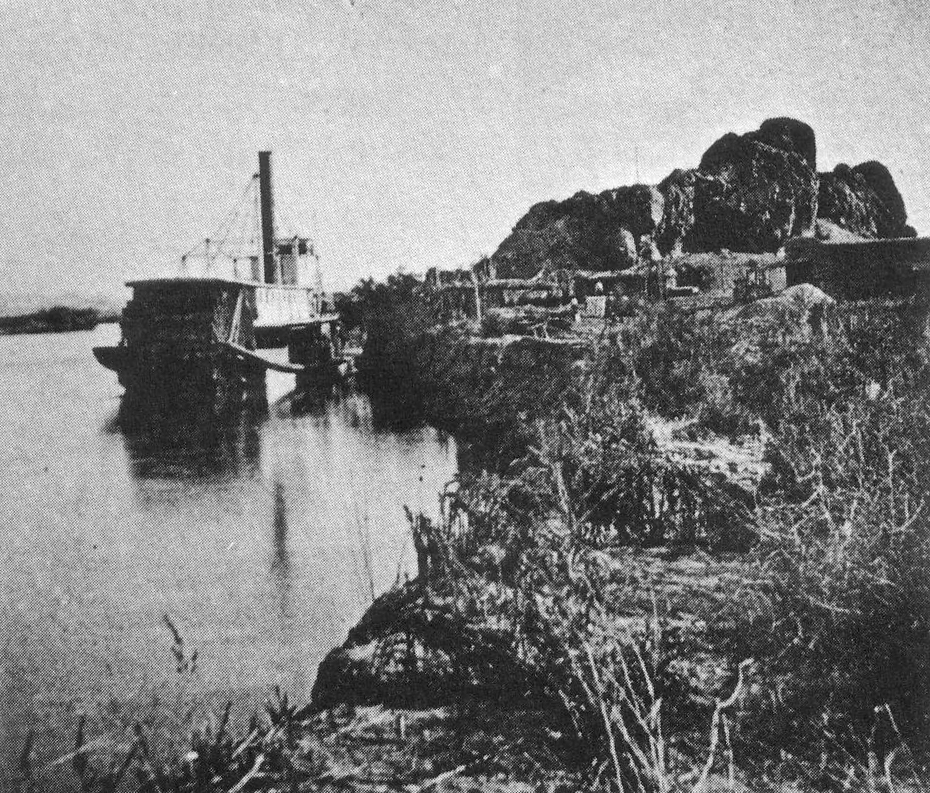
- Castle Dome Landing, 1877

- Location within Arizona Location within the United States
- Coordinates: 32°57′54″N 114°27′49″W
- Country: United States
- State: Arizona
- County: Yuma
- Founded: 1869
- Abandoned: 1978
- Named for: Castle Dome Mountains
- Elevation: 203 ft (62 m)

Population (2009)
  - Total: 0
- Time zone: UTC-7 (MST (no DST))
- Opened: December 17, 1875
- Closed: December 4, 1876
- Opened: August 6, 1878
- Closed: June 16, 1884
- GNIS feature ID: 24347

Castle Dome Landing (also Castle Dome City) is a ghost town in the Castle Dome Mountains of Yuma County in the U.S. state of Arizona. It was first settled as a transport depot and mining camp around 1863 in what was then the Arizona Territory.

== History ==
When the first Americans reached the Castle Dome Mountains in the early 1860s, there were already signs of previous mining activity. It was generally held that Native Americans had engaged in mining in the Castle Dome Mountains some years before and backpacked the ore 18 miles (29 km) south to a processing site on the banks of the Gila River, where remnants of adobe furnaces were found.

As mineral deposits began to be discovered up and down the Colorado River in the early 1860s, numerous mining camps and steamboat ports grew into towns along the river. Heading north from Yuma, prospectors staked gold and silver claims along the river and in the surrounding mountains. The Castle Dome Mining Company, established in 1863 and owned by Conner and Jacob Snively, purchased many of these claims and planned out the site of Castle Dome Landing on the banks of the Colorado River to act as a shipping point for ore on its way to California for smelting. The Snivelys planned only to mine silver in the area, but in that same year, well-known geologist and mining engineer William P. Blake realized that the region's copper-lead ores held extensive value, and lined up investors to develop mining operations in the area.

=== Castle Dome Mining Camp ===
Though prospecting and planning commenced years earlier, modern mining in the area didn't begin in earnest until 1869 due to hostilities with Native Americans. When the mines finally did begin operations, the mining camp that sprung up was known as Pitoti after a weed thought to be found only in that area. As the area grew, the town was renamed Castle Dome, and a post office was established in that name on December 17, 1875. Less than a year later, however, the post office was discontinued on December 4, 1876.

=== Castle Dome Landing ===
While the mining camp itself went into decline, the nearby riverside landing established some years earlier for steamboats of the Colorado River began to thrive. The landing, setup for transport of ore and as a supply point for the mines some 17 miles (27 km) east of the river, provided a new town site for the region, and was soon established as Castle Dome Landing. The post office re-opened under this new name on August 6, 1878, and the small port became an active supply and shipping depot for the mines in the Castle Dome Mountain mining district. For the next six years, Castle Dome Landing served as the first stop for steamboats traveling up the Colorado River from Yuma, and the town thrived, both as a supply and shipping point and as a popular destination for travelers from Yuma who came up the Colorado River for various celebrations held at the numerous river towns. For Castle Dome Landing, Mexican Independence Day on September 16 was the main draw.

By some accounts, the population of the town peaked at over 3,000 people, and rivaled Yuma in size as of 1880, almost becoming Yuma County's namesake. Other sources put the full-time residents at only 50. At its peak, it housed a post office, a hotel, a saloon, a general store, and smelting facilities.

=== Decline ===
As with many mining boomtowns, mining activity diminished, and the Castle Dome Landing post office closed down on June 16, 1884. The mines reopened in 1890, and the area became a significant source of lead for both World War I and World War II. In particular, when the Arizona Lead Company reopened the mines in 1943, they were able to produce significant amounts of lead in order to meet wartime demands.

After World War II, the demand for lead decreased, and the town again went into decline, though mining activity continued for some years in the area. The school was shut down in 1950, and the mines went into and out of use as the price of silver, still found in the area, rose and fell. By 1978, the mines were all shut down, and the last of the residents were gone.

== Remnants ==
The remains of Castle Dome Landing, once on the banks of the Colorado River, are now submerged beneath the Imperial Dam reservoir in Martinez Lake. The property that was previously Castle Dome town and mining camp was purchased in 1994 by Allen and Stephanie Armstrong, and turned into the Castle Dome Museum. The museum site houses over 50 restored and recreated buildings — seven original to the town, and the rest are period representations built mostly from locally scavenged materials. Each building, among them a saloon, a hotel, a mill, and a blacksmith, is staged to look like it might have looked in the town's heyday, some 100 years ago.

== Mining ==
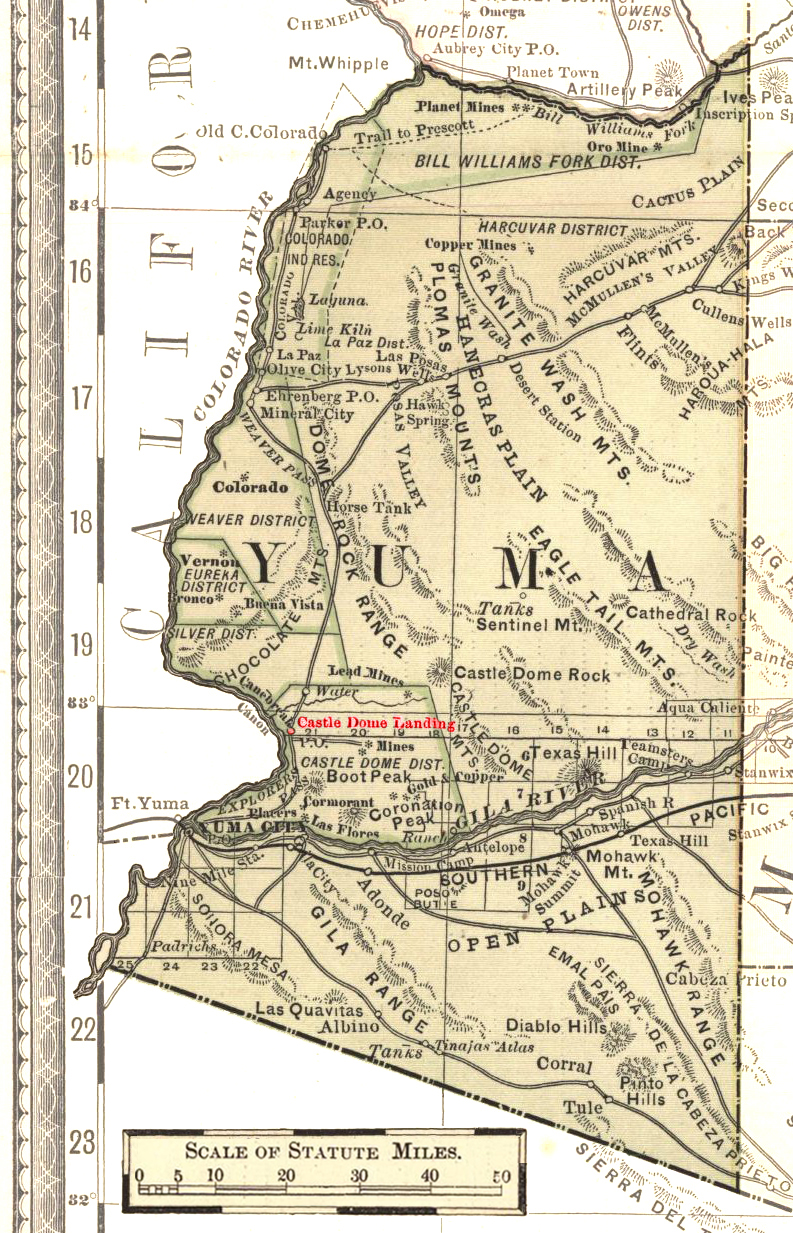
Map of Yuma County, Arizona, Castle Dome Landing highlighted, 1883.

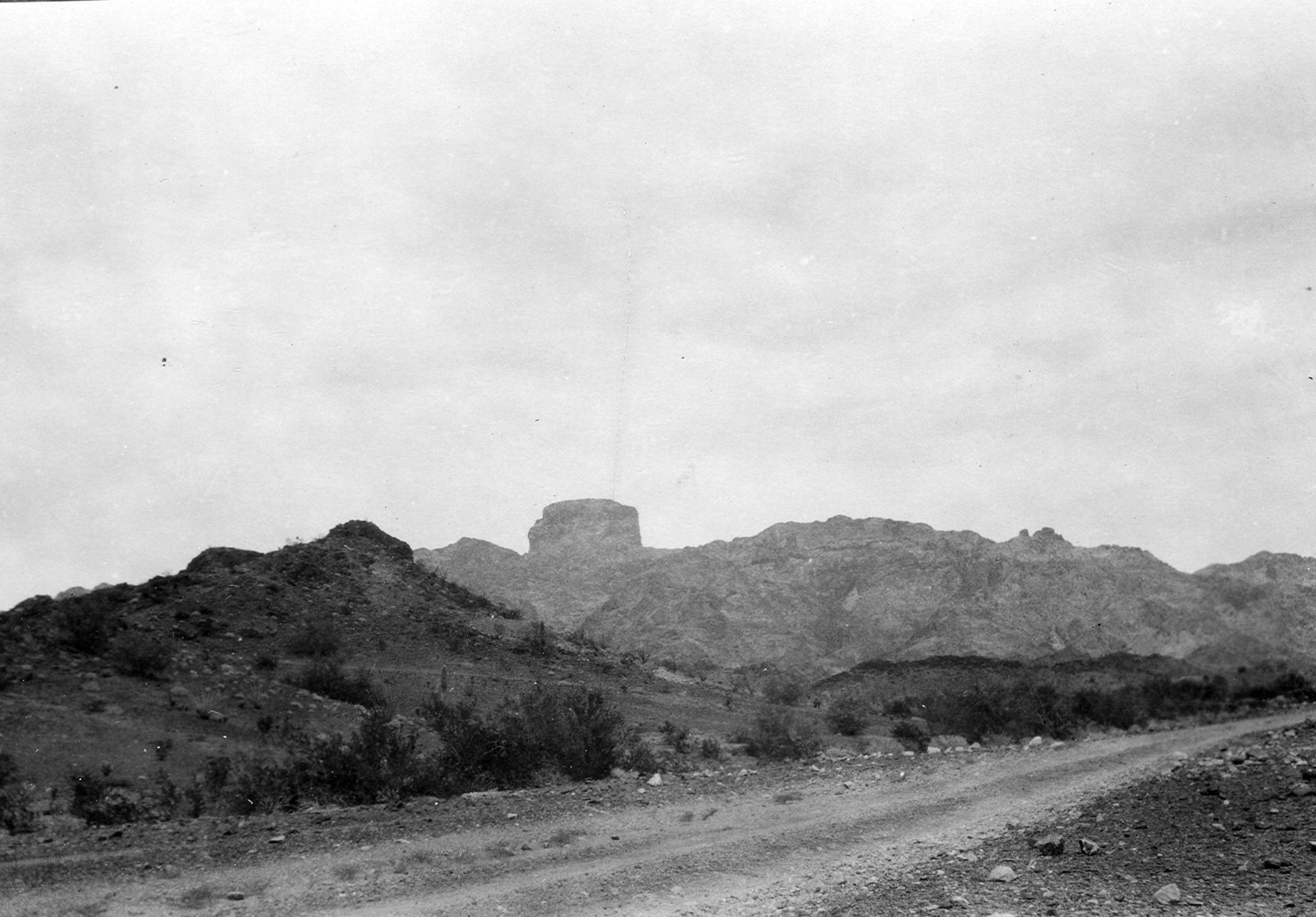
Castle Dome Mountains viewed from town of Castle Dome, Arizona, October 11, 1926.

Though silver was the original target for prospectors in the area, much of the early excitement over supposed silver deposits turned out to be veins of galena instead. As it turned out, the area was far more rich with lead ore than silver.

The Castle Dome mining district is one of Yuma County's oldest and most productive mining locations. Its proximity to the Colorado River and relatively low rates of freight at the time permitted the mining of even low grades of ore which wouldn't have been profitable at other locations. In addition to silver and lead, the area is rich in numerous other minerals, including zinc, copper, gold, and many others. Total production from the Castle Dome mines included 10,697 short tons (9,704 t) of lead, 498,000 troy ounces (546,000 oz; 15,500,000 g) of silver, 38 short tons (34 t) of zinc, 36 short tons (33 t) of copper, 2,000 troy ounces (2,200 oz; 62,000 g) of gold, and 7,000 troy ounces (7,700 oz; 220,000 g) of placer gold production, mostly prior to 1900.

The Castle Dome mining district is a popular district for mineral collectors. The region is known for striking combinations of cerussite, fluorite, vanadinite, wulfenite, barite, and mimetite, as well as galenite and anglesite. The Hull Mine and Puzzler Mine in particular have produced atypical green vanadinite and mimetite as well as yellow-hued wulfenite.

== Geography ==
Castle Dome Landing, now submerged, is located at 32°57′54″N 114°27′49″W (32.9650409, -114.4635592) about 30 miles (48 km) north of Yuma.

The original Castle Dome town and mining camp, now the site of the Castle Dome Museum, is located at 33°02′28″N 114°10′50″W, in close proximity to the Castle Dome Mine, located at 33°02′25″N 114°10′30″W.

== See also ==
- List of ghost towns in Arizona
- Silver mining in Arizona
- Steamboat transport on the Colorado River
