= White Pass School District =

School district in Lewis County, Washington

The White Pass School District is a school located in East Lewis County, Washington. It serves the communities of Packwood, Randle, and Glenoma which are located along US Highway 12. The district currently has a student population of around 500 students. The district and schools are named after the mountain pass over the crest of the Cascade Mountains, located at the east end of the district.

== Schools ==
=== Current school buildings ===
- White Pass Jr./Sr. High (7-12th grade)

516 Silverbrook Rd.
Randle, WA 98377
Mascot - Panthers

- White Pass Elementary (Preschool-6th grade), formerly Randle Elementary

127 Kindle Rd.
Randle, WA 98377
Mascot - Panther Cubs

=== Former school buildings ===
- Packwood Elementary

Mascot - Warriors

- Randle Elementary

Mascot - Tigers

- Glenoma Elementary

Mascot - Wildcats

== Athletics ==
The White Pass Panthers compete in the WIAA 2B classification. The team colors are orange and black.

From 2010 through 2026, White Pass High School joined all its athletic programs with neighboring Morton High School in the WIAA 2B classification as the Morton/White Pass Timberwolves. The Morton-White Pass boy's high school basketball team won back-to-back state championships in 2014 and 2015. Both titles were achieved during undefeated seasons.

The Panthers compete in interscholastic competitions throughout the school year, including

Fall Sports

- 8-Man Football
- Cross Country
- Volleyball

Winter Sports

- Boys Basketball
- Girls Basketball

Spring Sports

- Track and Field
- Boys Baseball
- Girls Fastpitch Softball

Academic

- Knowledge Bowl

== 2004 school closures ==
Due to loss of timber industry and Forest Service jobs, the school-age population of the entire White Pass School district had declined significantly from its high in the 1970s, especially from the mid-1990s-2000s. By 2004, the Packwood and Glenoma Elementary Schools' K-6 enrollments dropped to around 50 students each, resulting in the closure of the Packwood and Glenoma schools. Since 2004, all students in the district have been taught at the Elementary/High School campus in Randle.

== Construction ==
In 2009, construction began on a new high school as a replacement for the aging cinder block building. Construction was completed on the new high school in summer, 2010, and junior high and high school classes and athletics occupied the new facility beginning Fall, 2010. Thereafter, a complete gutting and remodel of the old elementary school began, with elementary classes occupying the old high school building for the 2010-2011 school year. Currently the Elementary School resides next to the present Jr/Sr High School and district offices. Due to rising attendance in the Junior High grades, the district may be looking into various ways to reduce class size and improve mobility within the school for junior high and high school students alike.

== Notable alumni ==
- Scott Carnahan (1969) - Baseball Coach and Athletic Director, Linfield College; Assistant coach/business manager, 1996 US Olympic baseball team
- Michael Moodenbaugh - theme park owner/developer
- Darrell Davis, Professor and Chair of Medicinal Chemistry and Adjunct Professor of Biochemistry, University of Utah
- Kenneth Brown (1994) - Professor of Electrical and Computer Engineering, Physics, and Chemistry, Duke University
- Eric Blanton (2000) - Nationally recognized AA and AAA Minor League Baseball turf manager
