= Awalt, Tennessee =

Ghost town in Franklin County, Tennessee

Coordinates: 35°16′41″N 86°14′16″W

Awalt is a ghost town in Franklin County, Tennessee.

== History ==
Awalt was likely named for John Awalt, an early settler. A post office was established at Awalt in 1845, and remained in operation until it was discontinued in 1906. In the 1870s Awalt contained a sawmill and a gristmill.

The settlement of Awalt was almost completely submerged by Tims Ford Lake. Construction of Tims Ford Dam on the Elk River began in 1966 and was completed in 1970. Graves were relocated to the New Awalt Cemetery on the ridge, and all persons living in Awalt were displaced. All structures were removed before the filling of the lake which took nearly two years. Several roads which are now used as boat access ramps were once roads down into the town of Awalt which sat in the bottom of a hollow in one of the lowest points of the current lake. The townspeople were mostly farmers. The population was nominal. Most people living in Awalt moved into Franklin County or Coffee County after the lake came. Much of the former town area is now occupied by Holiday Landing Marina and Resort.
