= Riffe Lake =

Lake in Washington, United States

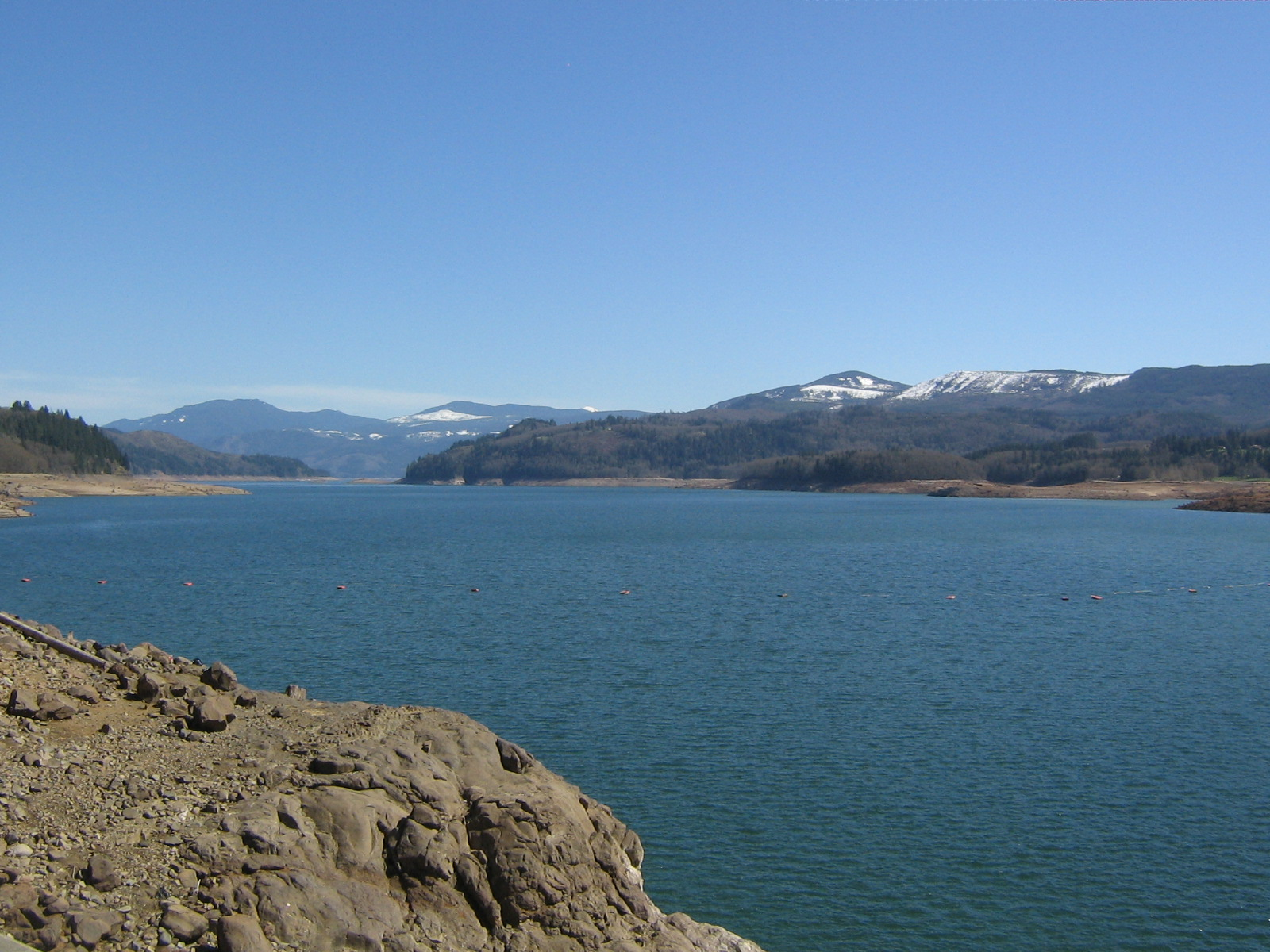

- Location within Washington (state) Location within the United States
- Location: Lewis County, Washington, United States
- Coordinates: 46°32′4″N 122°25′43″W
- Type: reservoir
- Primary inflows: Cowlitz River
- Primary outflows: Cowlitz River
- Catchment area: 1,400 sq mi (3,630 km^{2})
- Basin countries: United States
- Max. length: 23.5 mi (37.8 km)
- Surface area: 11,830 acres (47.9 km^{2})
- Max. depth: 360 feet (110 m)
- Shore length^{1}: 52 mi (83.7 km)
- Surface elevation: 778.5 ft (237 m)
- ^{1} Shore length is not a well-defined measure.

Riffe Lake is a long reservoir on the Cowlitz River in the U.S. state of Washington. Originally known as Davisson Lake, the 23.5 mi (38 km) lake was created by the construction of Mossyrock Dam, the tallest dam in the state, in 1968 by Tacoma City Light (now Tacoma Power). Riffe Lake includes six islands, three of which being incredibly small, sandy islets. None of them have names.

== History ==
The reservoir was formed behind Mossyrock Dam in the late 1960s and submerged the communities of Kosmos, Nesika, and Riffe; residents of the area were relocated due to the planned inundation. It was originally called Mossyrock Lake, then later named Davisson Lake in 1962 after Ira Davisson, a utilities commissioner in Tacoma. The name was approved by the Tacoma Utilities Board and later the Federal Power Commission. The 1968 state highway map published by the Washington State Department of Highways named it "Riffe Lake" for the inundated community instead of Davisson Lake, which was not officially recorded by the U.S. Board on Geographic Names. The name was officially changed to Riffe Lake in 1976 after Lewis County residents petitioned the state's Board of Geographical Names to honor a more local figure. The change was approved by the U.S. Board on Geographic Names in August of that year.

In 2017, Tacoma Power lowered the maximum water level of the lake by 30 feet (9.1 m) due to concerns that spillway piers could fail during a major seismic event and cause catastrophic flooding.

== Ecology and environment ==
Located on the eastern shore of the lake is the Kosmos Unit, a part of the Cowlitz Wildlife Area. Also known as Kosmos Flat, the 520-acre (210 ha) site contains a mix of habitats, such as meadow, riparian, and wetland, and is split by Rainey Creek. Parts of the meadow are flooded during peak water levels. The unit contains a small hardwood forest and is known for abundant wildlife, especially various species of birds including pheasants, songbirds, ospreys, and raptors. Additional sites for birdwatching include Goat Creek Flats and Landers Creek Flats.

== Recreation ==
The lake accommodates two parks, Mossyrock Park and Taidnapam Park. Due to the decrease in water levels, the boat launches at both recreation areas have been closed periodically since 2017 and are only reopened when water levels are increased. During this time, the parks underwent recreation improvements with proposals to extend the launches for more consistent accessibility.

The Gary Stamper Memorial Overlook, located on the northern shore of Riffe Lake off U.S. Route 12, was opened and dedicated in June 2025. Named in honor of a long-serving community volunteer and Lewis County commissioner who was born in the area before it was flooded, the overlook contains a memorial plaque and an interpretive panel.

The lake contains species of fish including rainbow and brown trout, landlocked coho, bass both large mouth and small mouth, bluegill, crappie, and perch.

== See also ==
- List of geographic features in Lewis County, Washington
- List of lakes in Washington
