= Lewis and Clark (disambiguation) =

Lewis and Clark collectively refers to Meriwether Lewis and William Clark, leaders of the Lewis and Clark Expedition, the first expedition to cross the western portion of the United States.

Lewis and Clark or Lewis & Clark may also refer to:

== Places ==
- Lewis and Clark Caverns, limestone caverns and associated sites in Montana
- Lewis and Clark County, Montana, originally named Edgerton County
- Lewis and Clark Lake, a reservoir on the border of Nebraska and South Dakota
- Lewis and Clark National Forest, in central Montana
- Lewis and Clark National Historic Trail, a trail from Illinois to Oregon
  - Lewis and Clark Trail, alternate name of the National Historic Trail
- Lewis and Clark National Historical Park, a collection of state and federal sites near Astoria, Oregon
- Lewis and Clark National Wildlife Refuge, a wildlife refuge in Clatsop County, Oregon
- Lewis and Clark River, a river in northwest Oregon
- Lewis and Clark State Historic Site, a historic site in Hartford, Illinois
- Lewis and Clark State Park (disambiguation), list of the five state parks of this name
- Lewis and Clark State Recreation Site, a state park near Troutdale, Oregon
- Lewis and Clark Trail State Park, a state park in southeastern Washington
- Lewis and Clark Township, a township in Missouri

== Schools ==
- Lewis & Clark College, a private college in Portland, Oregon
  - Lewis & Clark Law School, that institution's private law school
- Lewis and Clark Community College, in Godfrey, Illinois
- Lewis and Clark High School, in Spokane, Washington
- Lewis–Clark State College, a public college in Lewiston, Idaho

== Other uses ==
- Lewis & Clark (elm cultivar), trade name Prairie Expedition
- Lewis & Clark Council, a Boy Scouts of America group in Illinois
- Lewis & Clark (TV series), a short-lived NBC series
- Lewis & Clark: The Journey of the Corps of Discovery, a 1997 documentary film by Ken Burns
- Lewis and Clark (sculpture), a 1934 sculpture by Leo Friedlander
- Lewis and Clark Memorial Column, a monument in Portland, Oregon
- Meriwether Lewis and William Clark (sculpture), a bronze sculpture by Charles Keck
- Lewis and Clark Centennial Exposition, a 1905 exposition in Portland, Oregon
- USNS Lewis and Clark (T-AKE-1), a support ship of the US Navy
  - Lewis and Clark-class dry cargo ship
- Lewis and Clark Explorer, a discontinued excursion train in Oregon

== See also ==
- Lewis and Clark Bridge (disambiguation)
- Lewis and Clark Highway (disambiguation)
- Lewis Clark (disambiguation)
- Eldece Clarke-Lewis (born 1965), Bahamian sprinter
- Lewis v. Clarke, a 2017 U.S. Supreme Court case about tribal sovereignty
- Lewis & Clarke, the nom-de-plume of musician Lou Rogai
- Lois & Clark: The New Adventures of Superman, a 1990s Superman television series
- Luis and Clark, a line of carbon-fiber stringed instruments
- Lewis (disambiguation)
- Clark (disambiguation)
