= List of parks and recreation in Lewis County, Washington =

The county parks system in Lewis County, Washington, is run by the Lewis County Parks and Recreation Department. The agency also oversees and cooperates with cities, towns, and other municipalities and organizations throughout the county in maintaining historical buildings and spaces, and other recreational areas. As of 2022, the county directly oversees 164.0 acres (66.4 ha) of parks with a department budget of $65,000.

Lewis County is home to natural areas, parks, and other recreational spots under the oversight of several state and federal park systems, including such areas as Rainbow Falls State Park and Mount St. Helens National Volcanic Monument.

== Parks ==
In 2010, the county declared that all parks under its jurisdiction were to be "No Shooting Zones". A proposal was introduced in 2020 that would transfer 180.0 acres (72.8 ha) of Washington state parks land to Lewis County. The undeveloped parcel, known as Skate Creek, is situated alongside the Cowlitz River near Packwood.

County parks were closed during the COVID-19 pandemic and fully reopened by 2023. That year, new playground equipment was installed at Rose, Schafer, and South County Regional parks. Additional plans were introduced that same year to add a course for disc golf and a pickleball court.

Name	Image	Established	Location	Size	Description
Back Memorial Park		1978	Adna - 146 Dieckman Road	5.39 acres (2.18 ha)	Donated in 1975, the park is named after early Adna settlers, Soren and Kristina Back. The park, adjacent to the high school and the Willapa Hills Trail, offers sports and playground areas, with a 0.25-mile (0.40 km) track. It is co-maintained with the local Lions Club.
Cowlitz River Public Access Park (Packwood Park)		2022	Packwood - 105 Alta Drive	4.06 acres (1.64 ha)	The park provides access to the Cowlitz River and hosts a nature trail.
Hopkins Hill Mt. St. Helens Viewpoint		1982	Morton - Short Road		An undeveloped natural area, it provides a southern view of the crater of Mt. St. Helens.
Mineral Lake Swim Area			Mineral - 138 Mineral Road N	0.13 acres (0.053 ha)	Undeveloped, the parcel provides public access to Mineral Lake.
Rose County Park		1963	Adna/Chehalis - 263 Penning Road	21.0 acres (8.5 ha)	Donated to the county in honor of Eugene Rose by his wife. According to the deed, the land must remain as much in a natural state as possible. The park contains a fitness trail and various picnic, playground, and sports amenities.
Schaefer County Park		1976	Centralia - 822 WA State Route 507	14.0 acres (5.7 ha)	Designed in mind for people with disabilities, the land was once used as a swimming area known as "The Shallows" in the early 20th century. The park is split by the Skookumchuck River and provides trails, river access and fishing, picnic and sports amenities, and a large playground. The county owns undeveloped parcels across from SR 507.
South County Regional Park (Note: During the early years of South County Regional Park, the site was also known under the moniker, South Lewis County Regional Park.)		1996	Toledo - 212 Ray Rd	43.0 acres (17.4 ha)	Construction on the park began in 1989 and was eastimated to cost $1.1 million. The site features a stocked 17-acre (6.9 ha) pond with 3 fishing piers, as well as a beach with a swimming area. Other amenities include various spaces for playgrounds, picnicking, sports activities, and an asphalt trail around the basin, known as Wallace Pond.
Southwest Washington Fairgrounds Park		1909	Chehalis - N National Ave	78.2 acres (31.6 ha)	The park is separated into 5 parcels, including the entirety of the fairgrounds buildings and structures, as well as a senior center. The area contains several campgrounds covering 3.23 acres (1.31 ha) and has 200 RV sites.

== Venues ==
Name	Image	Established	Location	Size	Description
Claquato Church		1858	Chehalis - 125 Water St	0.37 acres (0.15 ha)	Maintenance of the grounds and historic church are under the auspices of Lewis County.
St. Urban Church		1891	Saint Urban - 648 N Military Road	1.58 acres (0.64 ha)	Owned by the Catholic Diocese, the building, and rentals for events, is maintained by the county.

== Trails ==
Outside of trails located within county, state, or federal parks, Lewis County features several large trail systems. The Willapa Hills Trail is a rail trail on a decommissioned railroad track that stretches from Chehalis to South Bend, Washington. Centralia's Discovery Trail parallels the Chehalis River, and Chehalis is home to the Airport Levee and Airport Road trails which lie around the Chehalis–Centralia Airport.

The Pacific Crest Trail, designated as a National Scenic Trail, courses through several wilderness areas in Eastern Lewis County, including Goat Rocks and Old Snowy Mountain.

== Historical markers ==
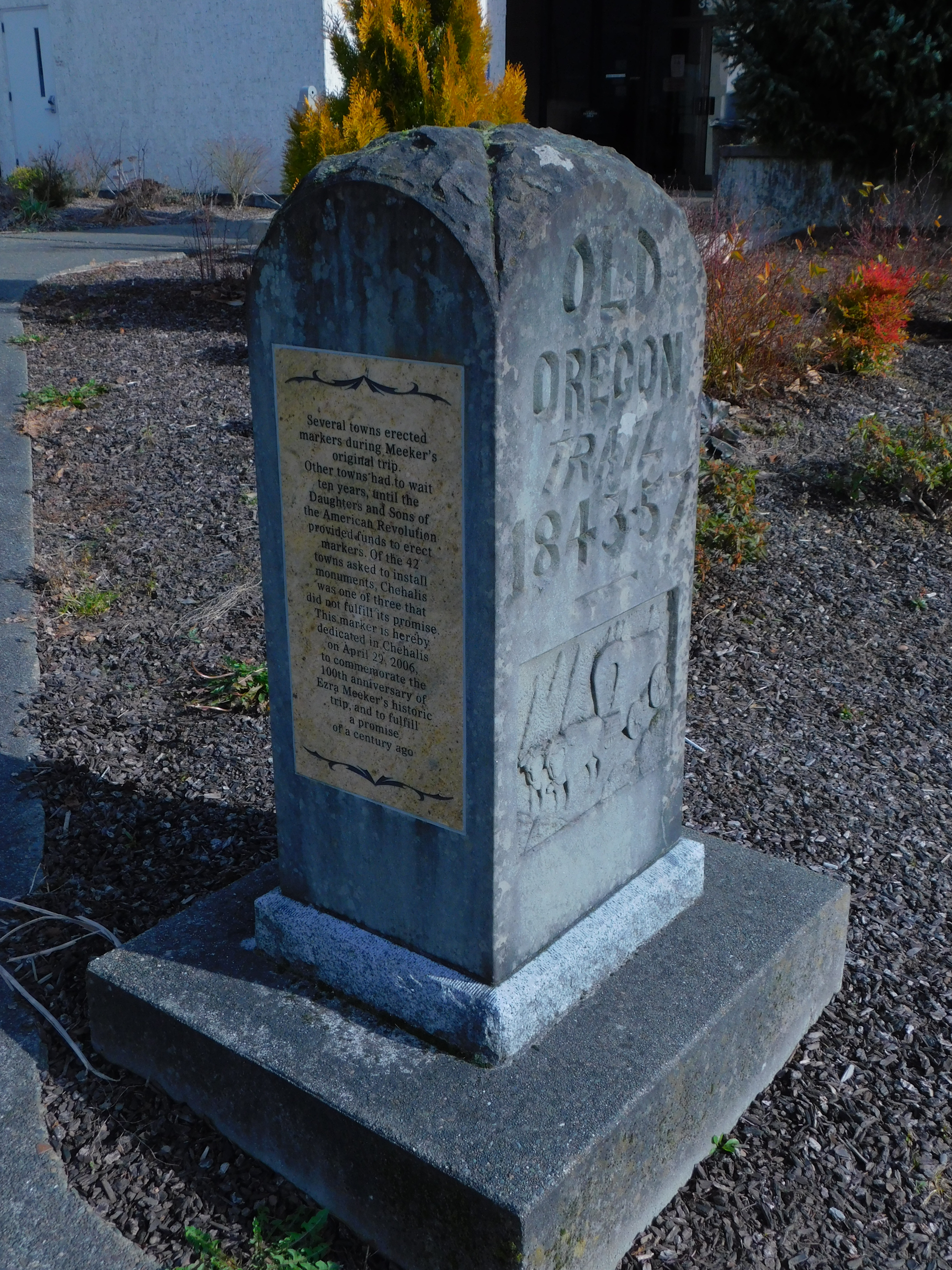
Ezra Meeker Trail marker at City Hall in Chehalis, Washington

The county honors the travels of pioneer Ezra Meeker on the Oregon Trail with several historical markers throughout the region. Markers are located in Centralia, Chehalis, Claquato, and Toledo.

== Recreation ==
The Lewis County Historic Bike Ride is an annual, mid-spring fundraising event that began as a county-held historic celebration in the early 1990s. The ride starts in Mary's Corner and through a variety of course options, participants can travel to several small towns and communities in the county, including Evaline, Salkum, Saint Urban, and Vader, and can bike through Centralia and Chehalis. The route is often used as a warm-up by riders of the Seattle to Portland Bicycle Classic (STP) due to the similarities in elevation gains and topography.

== Other parks ==
=== National Parks ===
National parks located partially in Lewis County include Gifford Pinchot National Forest and the Mount St. Helens National Volcanic Monument, both of which are managed by the United States Forest Service (USFS). In addition, the USFS is responsible for numerous creeks and lakes, and campgrounds such as La Wis Wis. The National Park Service (NPS) administers considerable camp sites on national park lands in the county.

=== Washington state parks ===
Washington state parks that reside solely in Lewis County include:

- Ike Kinswa State Park
- Lewis and Clark State Park
- Packwood State Park (Skate Creek Nature Park)
- Rainbow Falls State Park
- Tilton (River) State Park

The state also oversees several heritage sites including the Jackson House State Park Heritage Site and Matilda N. Jackson State Park Heritage Site, both located in the community of Mary's Corner. The Willapa Hills Trail, a rail trail park that stretches from Lewis County to Pacific County, is under management by the state.

The Washington Department of Fish and Wildlife (WDFW) is tasked with maintaining fish stocks in several lakes in the county, and oversees fish hatcheries as well as many natural preserves and spaces. The largest wildlife corridor is the Cowlitz River Area and is composed of several units on land owned by Tacoma Power. The area protects distinct and various riparian, wetland, and woodland habitats. The Washington State Department of Natural Resources (DNR) manages an assortment of recreational areas.

=== Utility company parks ===
Separate from direct county oversight, the Lewis County Public Utility District (LCPUD) manages several parks and areas under its jurisdiction in the county. Based on a requirement for its operating license, the LCPUD provides open spaces and buffer zones for environmental protections near its projects, with special attention to vegetation and wildlife management. Several of these sites have been converted into recreational areas and include the Copper Canyon Creek Take-Out Site, Cowlitz Falls Day Use Park, the 110-acre (45 ha) Leonard “Bud” Allen Park (Cowlitz Falls) Campground, Packwood Ballpark, and a boat launch site at Swofford Pond near Swofford, Washington.

Tacoma Power & Light maintains three parks in the county situated around the Mayfiled-Riffe Lake dam complexes. Listed are Mayfield Lake Park, Mossyrock Park, and Taidnapam Park, and the power company also oversees Swofford Pond.

== See also ==
- List of geographic features in Lewis County, Washington
- List of Washington state parks
- Parks and recreation in Centralia, Washington
- Parks and recreation in Chehalis, Washington
