= Lewis and Clark State Park =

Lewis and Clark State Park may refer to the following:

- Lewis and Clark State Park (Iowa)
- Lewis and Clark State Park (Missouri)
- Lewis and Clark State Park (North Dakota)
- Lewis and Clark State Park (Oregon)
- Lewis and Clark State Park (Washington)
- Lewis and Clark Trail State Park in Washington
- Lewis and Clark National and State Historical Parks in Oregon and Washington
