= Louis Clark (disambiguation) =

Louis Clark (1947–2021) was a British musical arranger and keyboard player.

Louis Clark is also the name of:

- Louis Clark (wide receiver) (born 1964), former Seattle Seahawks player
- Louis Clark (American football coach), former Dayton Flyers and Dayton Triangles head coach
- Louis Clark (footballer) (born 1990), English footballer

== See also ==
- Lewis Clark (disambiguation)
- Lewis W. Clark (1828–1900), U.S. judge, Chief Justice for New Hampshire
- Lewis and Clark (disambiguation)
- Louis (disambiguation)
- Clark (disambiguation)
- Louis Clarke (disambiguation)
