= Lewis and Clark State Park (Washington) =

State park in the U.S. state of Washington

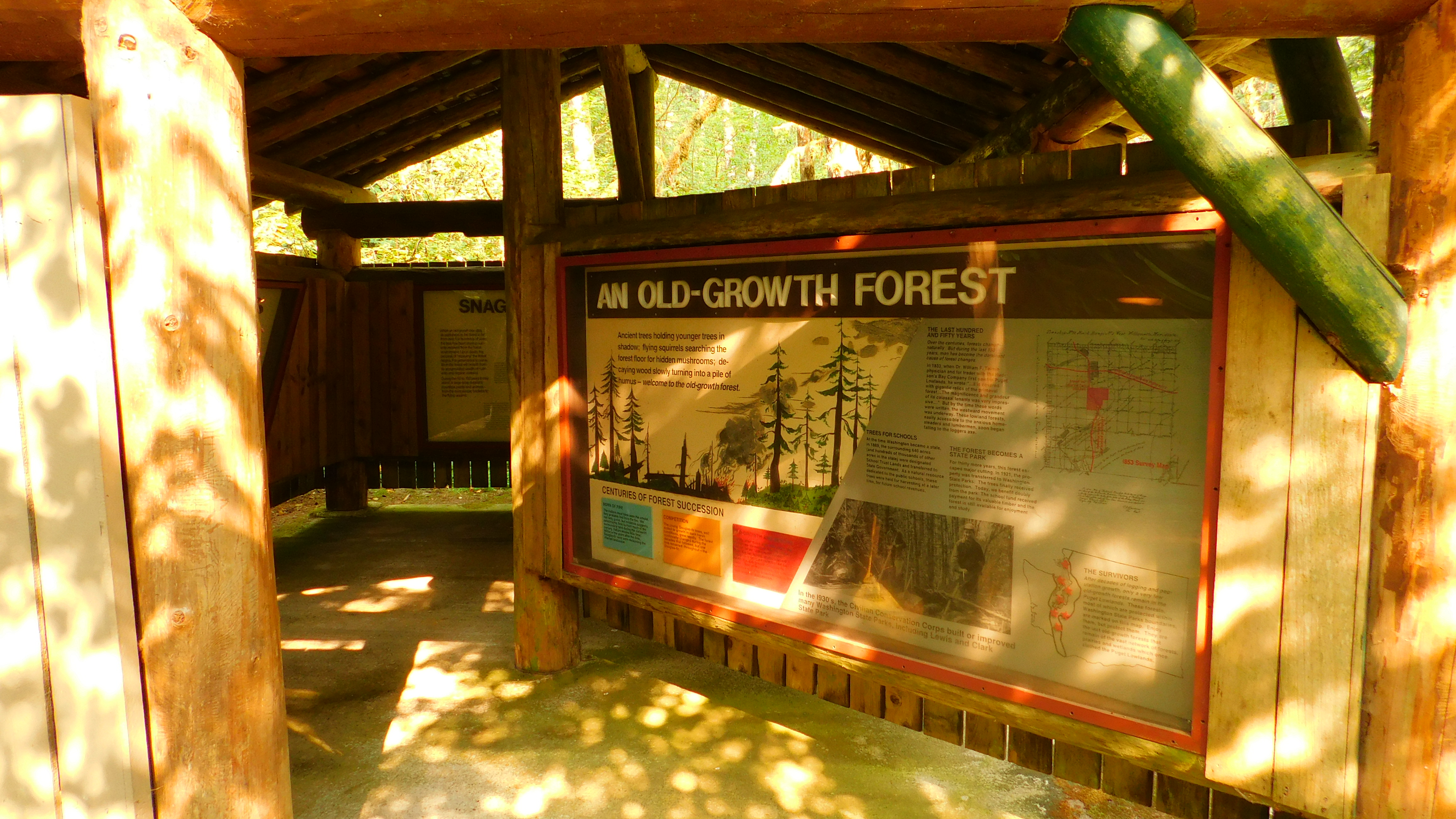
- Interpretive panels, Lewis and Clark State Park

- Location within Washington (state) Location within the United States
- Location: Lewis County, Washington, United States
- Coordinates: 46°31′20″N 122°48′49″W
- Area: 616 acres (249 ha)
- Elevation: 453 ft (138 m)
- Established: 1922
- Administrator: Washington State Parks and Recreation Commission
- Visitors: 80,286 (in 2024)
- Named for: Meriwether Lewis and William Clark
- Website: Official website

Lewis and Clark State Park is a public recreation area located six miles (9.7 km) northeast of Winlock and immediately south of Mary's Corner in Lewis County, Washington. Named after the explorers Lewis and Clark, despite the expedition not venturing in the area during their travels, the state park occupies one of the last major stands of old-growth forest in the state. When the park opened in the 1920s it was visited by over 10,000 people per year.

== History ==
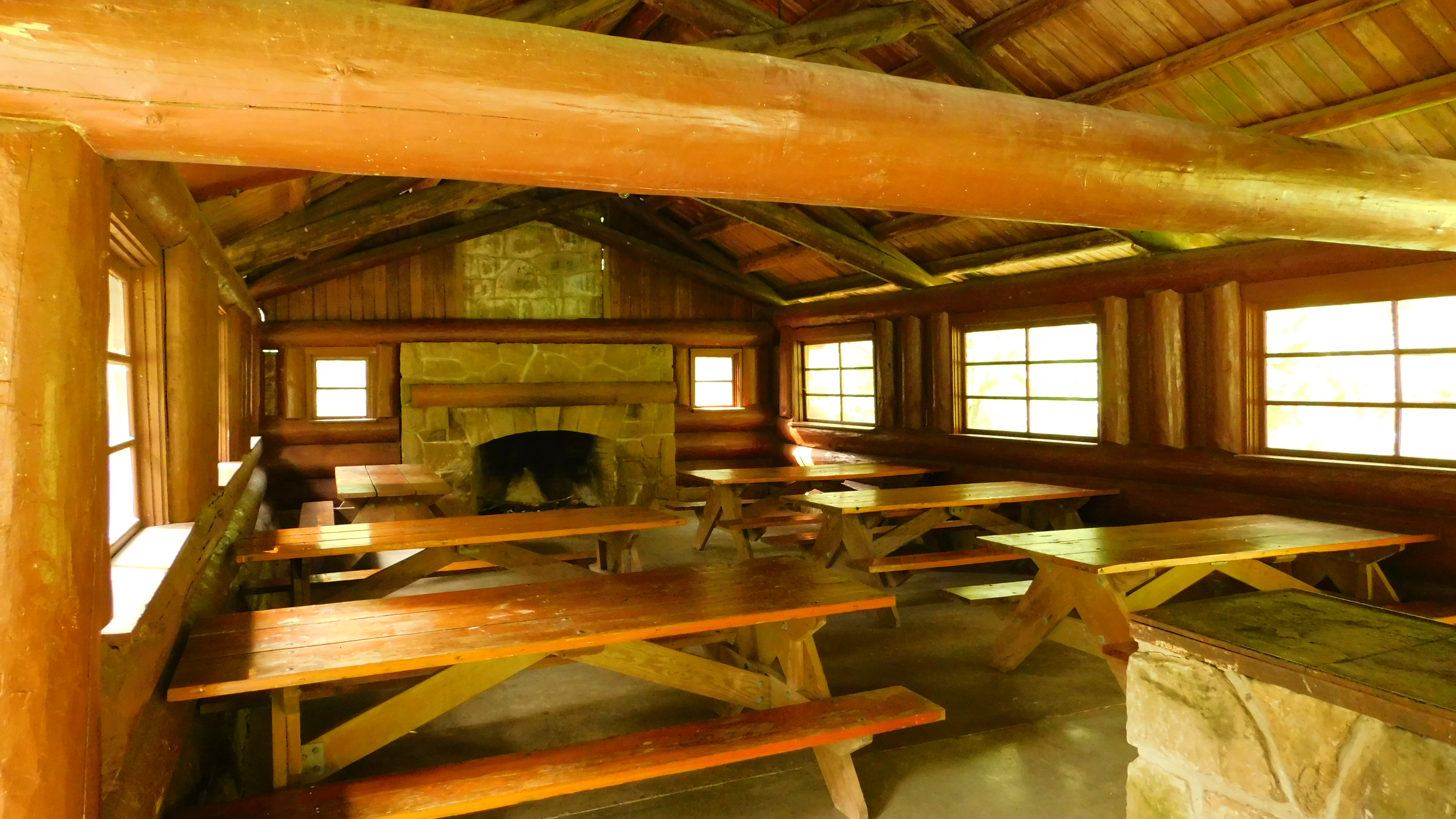
Civilian Conservation Corps pavilion

Lewis and Clark State Park began in May 1922 after the state park board announced a 520-acre (210 ha) park to be located on Lacamas Hill approximately 12 miles (19 km) south of Chehalis on the Pacific Highway. Commissioner of Public Lands, Clark Savidge, reserved the old-growth parcel, believing that the natural forested landscape and its connection as a state resource would be appreciated by automobile travelers. The lands originally contained a northern spur of the Oregon Trail.

The park was dedicated on September 23, 1922 during a ceremony that included Washington state governor Louis F. Hart. At the time considered the largest state park in Washington, the grounds contained the largest tract of old-growth forest in a Washington state park. Under a resolution passed by the state legislature in 1921, the park is required to remain as a natural wooded area.

Annual visitors numbers reached 10,000 during the early years of the park. By 2005, natural gas was reported to be stored in caverns located under the park as part of the Jackson Prairie Underground Natural Gas Storage Facility.

== Amenities and features ==
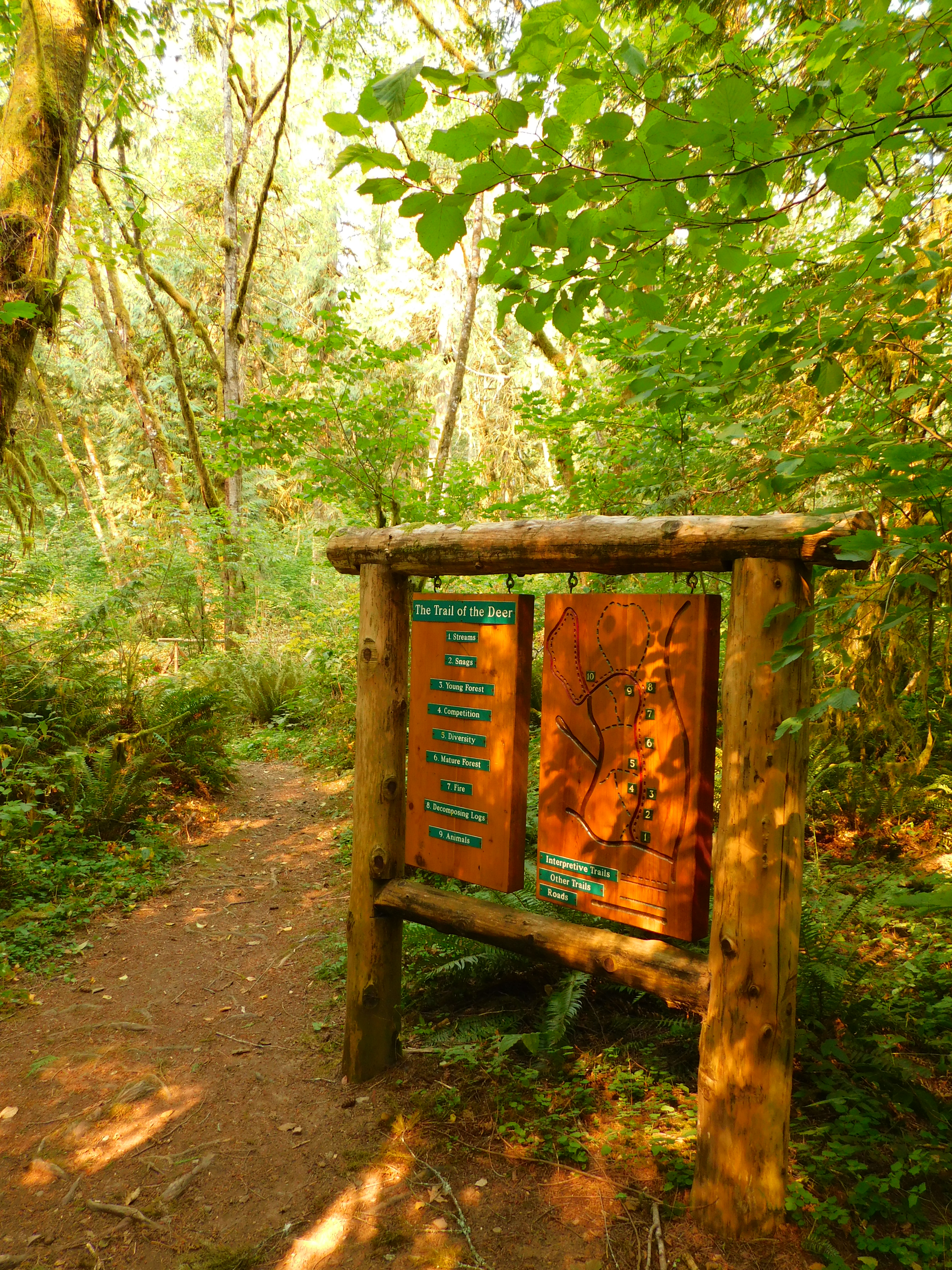
Trail of the Deer

The park's 616 acres (249 ha) include camping areas and trails for hiking and horseback riding. Trails within the parcel border on a zone showing the forest rebounding from damage due to the Columbus Day Storm of 1962. Evidence of the efforts by the Civilian Conservation Corps to improve the park in the 1930s can be found in the park's rustic shelters and restroom facilities.

Remnants of the Cowlitz Trail are visible in the park, noted by deep grooves caused by wagons and settlers traveling the route.

== See also ==
- Jackson House State Park Heritage Site
- Matilda N. Jackson State Park Heritage Site
