= Gary Klein =

Gary Klein may refer to:

- Gary A. Klein (born 1944), American researcher of decision making
- Gary Klein (producer) (born 1942), songwriter and record producer & co-writer of "(I Wanna Be) Bobby's Girl"
- Gary Klein (inventor), bicycle designer and inventor
