= Drumheller (provincial electoral district) =

Defunct provincial electoral district in Alberta, Canada

Alberta electoral district

Defunct provincial electoral district
- Legislature: Legislative Assembly of Alberta
- District created: 1930
- District abolished: 1963
- District re-created: 1971
- District re-abolished: 1997
- First contested: 1930
- Last contested: 1993

Drumheller was a provincial electoral district in Alberta, Canada, mandated to return a single member to the Legislative Assembly of Alberta from 1930 to 1963 and again from 1971 to 1997.

== History ==
The electoral district was created during the 1930 Alberta general election from the north section of the Bow Valley provincial electoral district and the southwest section of the Hand Hills provincial electoral district. In the 1963 Alberta general election it was merged with the Gleichen riding to form the short lived Drumheller-Gleichen district.

After redistribution again in the 1971 Alberta general election the Gliechen portion was dropped to expand Little Bow and the riding was once again Drumheller. The riding remained until redistribution in the 1997 Alberta general election when Drumheller and neighboring Chinook merged to form Drumheller-Chinook.

=== Members of the Legislative Assembly (MLAs) ===
Members of the Legislative Assembly for Drumheller
Assembly	Years	Member	Party
See Bow Valley electoral district from 1913-1930 and Hand Hills electoral district from 1913-1930
7th	1930–1935	Fred Moyer	Independent
8th	1935–1940	Herbert Ingrey	Social Credit
9th	1940–1944	Gordon E. Taylor	Social Credit
10th	1944–1948	Gordon E. Taylor	Social Credit
11th	1948–1952	Gordon E. Taylor	Social Credit
12th	1952–1955	Gordon E. Taylor	Social Credit
13th	1955–1959	Gordon E. Taylor	Social Credit
14th	1959–1963	Gordon E. Taylor	Social Credit
See Drumheller-Gleichen electoral district from 1963-1971
17th	1971–1975	Gordon E. Taylor	Independent Social Credit
18th	1975–1979	Gordon E. Taylor	Independent Social Credit
19th	1979–1982	Lewis (Mickey) Clark	Progressive Conservative
20th	1982–1986	Lewis (Mickey) Clark	Progressive Conservative
21st	1986–1989	Stanley Schumacher	Progressive Conservative
22nd	1989–1993	Stanley Schumacher	Progressive Conservative
23rd	1993–1997	Stanley Schumacher	Progressive Conservative
See Drumheller-Chinook electoral district from 1997-2004

== Election results ==
=== 1930 ===
1930 Alberta general election
Party	Candidate	Votes	%	±%
First count
Independent	Fred C. Moyer	922	34.17%	–
Dominion Labor	Arch. F. Key	866	32.10%	–
Independent	D. A. Macaulay	722	26.76%	–
Independent	John O'Sullivan	188	6.97%	–
Total		2,698	–	–
Ballot transfer results
Independent	Fred C. Moyer	1,113	51.79%	–
Dominion Labor	Arch. F. Key	1,036	48.21%	–
Total		2,149	–	–
Rejected, spoiled and declined		167	–	–
Eligible electors / turnout		3,554	80.61%	–
Independent pickup new district.				
Source(s) Source: "Drumheller Official Results 1930 Alberta general election". Alberta Heritage Community Foundation. Instant-runoff voting requires a candidate to receive a plurality (greater than 50%) of the votes. As no candidate received a plurality of votes, the bottom candidate was eliminated and their 2nd place votes were applied to both other candidates until one received a plurality

=== 1935 ===
1935 Alberta general election
Party	Candidate	Votes	%	±%
Social Credit	Herbert Ingrey	2,158	59.63%	–
Independent	Fred C. Moyer	778	21.50%	-12.67%
Communist	M. Clarke	342	9.45%	–
Liberal	D. McDonald	341	9.42%	–
Total		3,619	–	–
Rejected, spoiled and declined		125	–	–
Eligible electors / turnout		4,433	84.46%	3.85%
Social Credit gain from Independent		Swing		-18.03%
Source(s) Source: "Drumheller Official Results 1935 Alberta general election". Alberta Heritage Community Foundation.

=== 1940 ===
1940 Alberta general election
Party	Candidate	Votes	%	±%
First count
Social Credit	Gordon E. Taylor	2,043	47.36%	-12.27%
Independent	Fred C. Moyer	1,530	35.47%	13.97%
Co-operative Commonwealth	W. G. Southern	741	17.18%	–
Total		4,314	–	–
Ballot transfer results
Social Credit	Gordon E. Taylor	2,330	57.53%	–
Independent	Fred C. Moyer	1,720	42.47%	–
Total		4,050	–	–
Rejected, spoiled and declined		238	–	–
Eligible electors / turnout		5,705	79.74%	-13.12%
Social Credit hold		Swing		-19.07%
Source(s) Source: "Drumheller Official Results 1940 Alberta general election". Alberta Heritage Community Foundation. Instant-runoff voting requires a candidate to receive a plurality (greater than 50%) of the votes. As no candidate received a plurality of votes, the bottom candidate was eliminated and their 2nd place votes were applied to both other candidates until one received a plurality

=== 1944 ===
1944 Alberta general election
Party	Candidate	Votes	%	±%
Social Credit	Gordon E. Taylor	2,243	61.84%	14.48%
Labor-Progressive	Thomas Mackie	713	19.66%	–
Co-operative Commonwealth	Alfred Thryso	671	18.50%	0.69%
Total		3,627	–	–
Rejected, spoiled and declined		70	–	–
Eligible electors / turnout		4,725	78.24%	-1.50%
Social Credit hold		Swing		N/A%
Source(s) Source: "Drumheller Official Results 1944 Alberta general election". Alberta Heritage Community Foundation.

=== 1948 ===
1948 Alberta general election
Party	Candidate	Votes	%	±%
Social Credit	Gordon E. Taylor	2,982	72.57%	10.73%
United Labour	Wm. M. "Bill" Price	856	20.83%	–
Liberal	Wm. Henry Guterson	271	6.60%	–
Total		4,109	–	–
Rejected, spoiled and declined		320	–	–
Eligible electors / turnout		5,800	76.36%	-1.88%
Social Credit hold		Swing		4.78%
Source(s) Source: "Drumheller Official Results 1948 Alberta general election". Alberta Heritage Community Foundation.

=== 1952 ===
1952 Alberta general election
Party	Candidate	Votes	%	±%
Social Credit	Gordon E. Taylor	3,458	91.82%	19.25%
Labor-Progressive	Arthur l. Roberts	308	8.18%	–
Total		3,766	–	–
Rejected, spoiled and declined		286	–	–
Eligible electors / turnout		6,531	62.04%	-14.32%
Social Credit hold		Swing		15.95%
Source(s) Source: "Drumheller Official Results 1952 Alberta general election". Alberta Heritage Community Foundation.

=== 1955 ===
1955 Alberta general election
Party	Candidate	Votes	%	±%
Social Credit	Gordon E. Taylor	3,224	73.24%	-18.58%
Liberal	J. A. Barclay	995	22.60%	–
Labor-Progressive	A. Lezanski	183	4.16%	-4.02%
Total		4,402	–	–
Rejected, spoiled and declined		35	–	–
Eligible electors / turnout		6,583	67.40%	5.36%
Social Credit hold		Swing		-16.50%
Source(s) Source: "Drumheller Official Results 1955 Alberta general election". Alberta Heritage Community Foundation.

=== 1959 ===
1959 Alberta general election
Party	Candidate	Votes	%	±%
Social Credit	Gordon E. Taylor	3,922	84.13%	10.89%
Progressive Conservative	Eneas A. Toshach	740	15.87%	–
Total		4,662	–	–
Rejected, spoiled and declined		16	–	–
Eligible electors / turnout		5,635	83.02%	15.62%
Social Credit hold		Swing		15.62%
Source(s) Source: "Drumheller Official Results 1959 Alberta general election". Alberta Heritage Community Foundation.

=== 1971 ===
1971 Alberta general election
Party	Candidate	Votes	%	±%
Independent Social Credit	Gordon E. Taylor	5,044	64.04%	–
Progressive Conservative	Whyne Ohlhauser	2,285	29.01%	–
New Democratic	Dick Hehr	547	6.95%	–
Total		7,876	–	–
Rejected, spoiled and declined		60	–	–
Eligible electors / turnout		10,991	72.20%	–
Independent Social Credit pickup new district.				
Source(s) Source: "Drumheller Official Results 1971 Alberta general election". Alberta Heritage Community Foundation.

=== 1975 ===
1975 Alberta general election
Party	Candidate	Votes	%	±%
Independent Social Credit	Gordon E. Taylor	4,428	60.20%	-3.84%
Progressive Conservative	Whyne Ohlhauser	2,678	36.41%	7.40%
New Democratic	Larry Schowalter	249	3.39%	-3.56%
Total		7,355	–	–
Rejected, spoiled and declined		25	–	–
Eligible electors / turnout		10,742	68.70%	-3.50%
Independent Social Credit hold		Swing		-5.62%
Source(s) Source: "Drumheller Official Results 1975 Alberta general election". Alberta Heritage Community Foundation.

=== 1979 ===
1979 Alberta general election
Party	Candidate	Votes	%	±%
Progressive Conservative	Lewis (Mickey) Clark	5,585	54.97%	18.56%
Independent	Vern Hoff	1,927	18.97%	–
Social Credit	Ken Taylor	1,913	18.83%	–
New Democratic	Ray Garrett	526	5.18%	1.79%
Liberal	Charles J. Dirk	209	2.06%	–
Total		10,160	–	–
Rejected, spoiled and declined		N/A	–	–
Eligible electors / turnout		14,892	68.22%	-0.48%
Progressive Conservative gain from Independent Social Credit		Swing		6.11%
Source(s) Source: "Drumheller Official Results 1979 Alberta general election". Alberta Heritage Community Foundation.

=== 1982 ===
1982 Alberta general election
Party	Candidate	Votes	%	±%
Progressive Conservative	Lewis (Mickey) Clark	8,148	68.46%	13.49%
Western Canada Concept	Vern Hoff	2,630	22.10%	–
New Democratic	Gerry Hamilton	1,124	9.44%	4.27%
Total		11,902	–	–
Rejected, spoiled and declined		56	–	–
Eligible electors / turnout		17,017	70.27%	2.05%
Progressive Conservative hold		Swing		5.18%
Source(s) Source: "Drumheller Official Results 1982 Alberta general election". Alberta Heritage Community Foundation.

=== 1986 ===
1986 Alberta general election
Party	Candidate	Votes	%	±%
Progressive Conservative	Stanley Schumacher	4,906	61.07%	-7.39%
Representative	Norman A. Stanger	1,729	21.52%	–
New Democratic	Sid Holt	1,154	14.37%	4.92%
Independent	Peter Hope	244	3.04%	–
Total		8,033	–	–
Rejected, spoiled and declined		14	–	–
Eligible electors / turnout		15,026	53.55%	-16.72%
Progressive Conservative hold		Swing		-3.41%
Source(s) Source: "Drumheller Official Results 1986 Alberta general election". Alberta Heritage Community Foundation.

=== 1989 ===
1989 Alberta general election
Party	Candidate	Votes	%	±%
Progressive Conservative	Stanley Schumacher	5,049	59.35%	-1.72%
Liberal	Roger Nelson	1,800	21.16%	–
New Democratic	Sid Holt	1,658	19.49%	5.12%
Total		8,507	–	–
Rejected, spoiled and declined		40	–	–
Eligible electors / turnout		15,236	56.10%	2.54%
Progressive Conservative hold		Swing		-0.68%
Source(s) Source: "Drumheller Official Results 1989 Alberta general election". Alberta Heritage Community Foundation.

=== 1993 ===
1993 Alberta general election
Party	Candidate	Votes	%	±%
Progressive Conservative	Stanley Schumacher	7,421	62.92%	3.57%
Liberal	Roger Nelson	2,457	20.83%	-0.33%
New Democratic	Steve Osborne	1,463	12.40%	-7.09%
Confederation of Regions	David McAndrews	454	3.85%	–
Total		11,795	–	–
Rejected, spoiled, and declined		29	–	–
Eligible electors / turnout		17,779	66.51%	10.41%
Progressive Conservative hold		Swing		1.95%
Source(s) Source: "Drumheller Official Results 1993 Alberta general election". Alberta Heritage Community Foundation.

== Plebiscite results ==
=== 1957 liquor plebiscite ===
1957 Alberta liquor plebiscite results: Drumheller
Question A: Do you approve additional types of outlets for the sale of beer, wine and spirituous liquor subject to a local vote?
Ballot choice	Votes	%
Yes	1,597	62.70%
No	950	37.30%
Total votes	2,547	100%
Rejected, spoiled and declined	14	
5,377 eligible electors, turnout 47.63%

On October 30, 1957, a stand-alone plebiscite was held province wide in all 50 of the then current provincial electoral districts in Alberta. The government decided to consult Alberta voters to decide on liquor sales and mixed drinking after a divisive debate in the legislature. The plebiscite was intended to deal with the growing demand for reforming antiquated liquor control laws.

The plebiscite was conducted in two parts. Question A, asked in all districts, asked the voters if the sale of liquor should be expanded in Alberta, while Question B, asked in a handful of districts within the corporate limits of Calgary and Edmonton, asked if men and women should be allowed to drink together in establishments.

Province wide Question A of the plebiscite passed in 33 of the 50 districts while Question B passed in all five districts. Drumheller voted in favour of the proposal by a solid margin. Voter turnout in the district was almost even with the province wide average of 46%.

Official district returns were released to the public on December 31, 1957. The Social Credit government in power at the time did not consider the results binding. However the results of the vote led the government to repeal all existing liquor legislation and introduce an entirely new Liquor Act.

Municipal districts lying inside electoral districts that voted against the plebiscite were designated Local Option Zones by the Alberta Liquor Control Board and considered effective dry zones. Business owners who wanted a licence had to petition for a binding municipal plebiscite in order to be granted a licence.

== See also ==
- List of Alberta provincial electoral districts
- Canadian provincial electoral districts
