= Louis Clarke =

Louis Clarke may refer to

- Louis Clarke (athlete) (1901–1977), American chemist, sprinter, and track and field athlete
- Louis Clarke (antiquarian) (1881–1960), English antiquarian, archaeologist, collector and curator
- Louis Semple Clarke (1866–1957), American businessman and engineer in the automotive industry

== See also ==
- Louis Clark (disambiguation)
- Lewis Clark (disambiguation)
