= Jackson House State Park Heritage Site =

Heritage site in Washington state, US

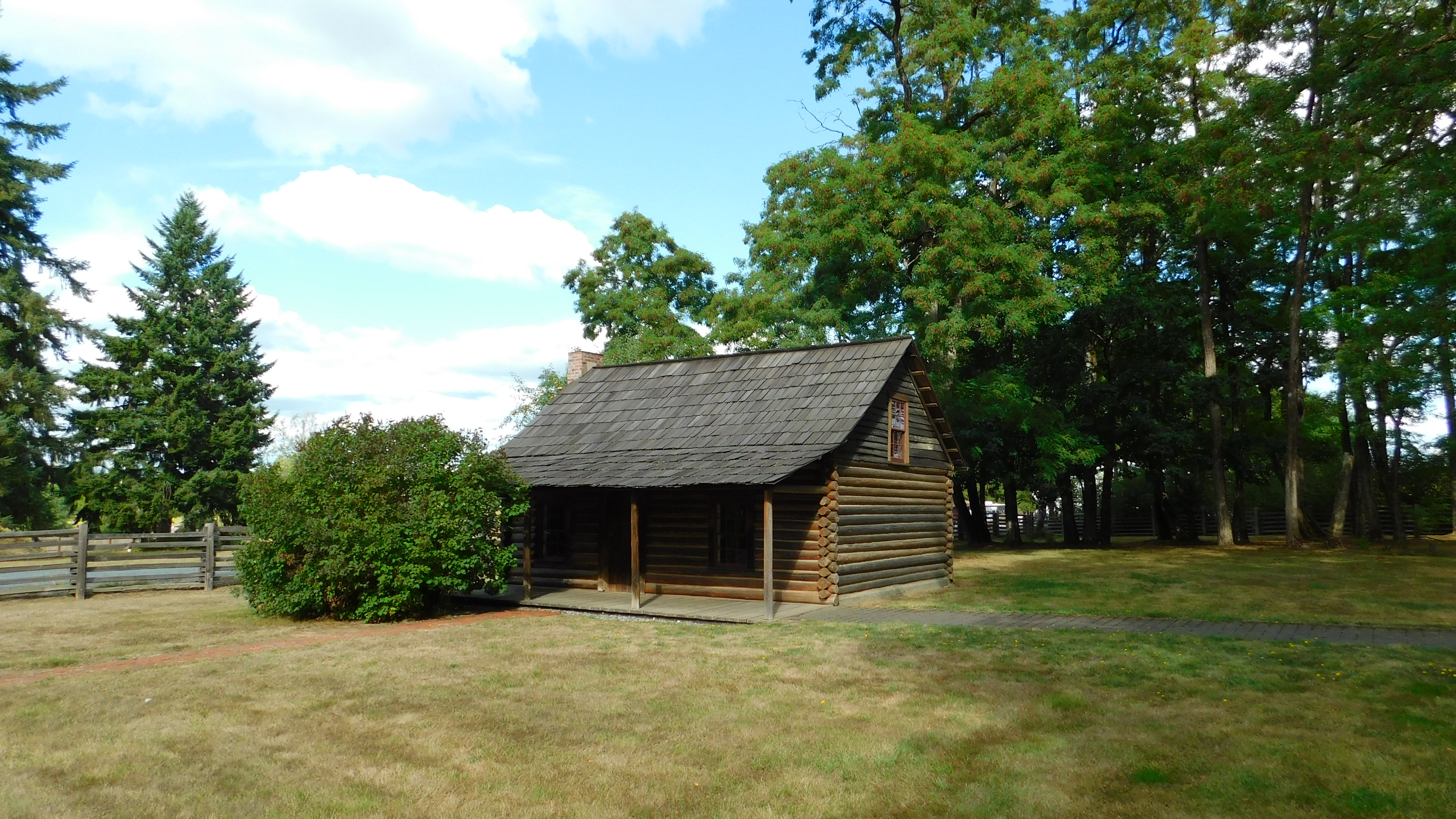

- Location within Washington (state) Location within the United States
- Location: 4277 Jackson Highway, Lewis County, Washington, United States
- Nearest city: Winlock, Washington
- Coordinates: 46°32′32″N 122°49′15″W
- Area: 1.4 acres (0.57 ha)
- Established: 1850 (homestead); 1915 (park)
- Named for: John R. Jackson (builder and homesteader)
- Visitors: 20,249 (in 2025)
- Operator: Washington State Parks and Recreation Commission
- Website: Jackson House State Park Heritage Site
- John R. Jackson House
- U.S. National Register of Historic Places
- Washington State Heritage Register
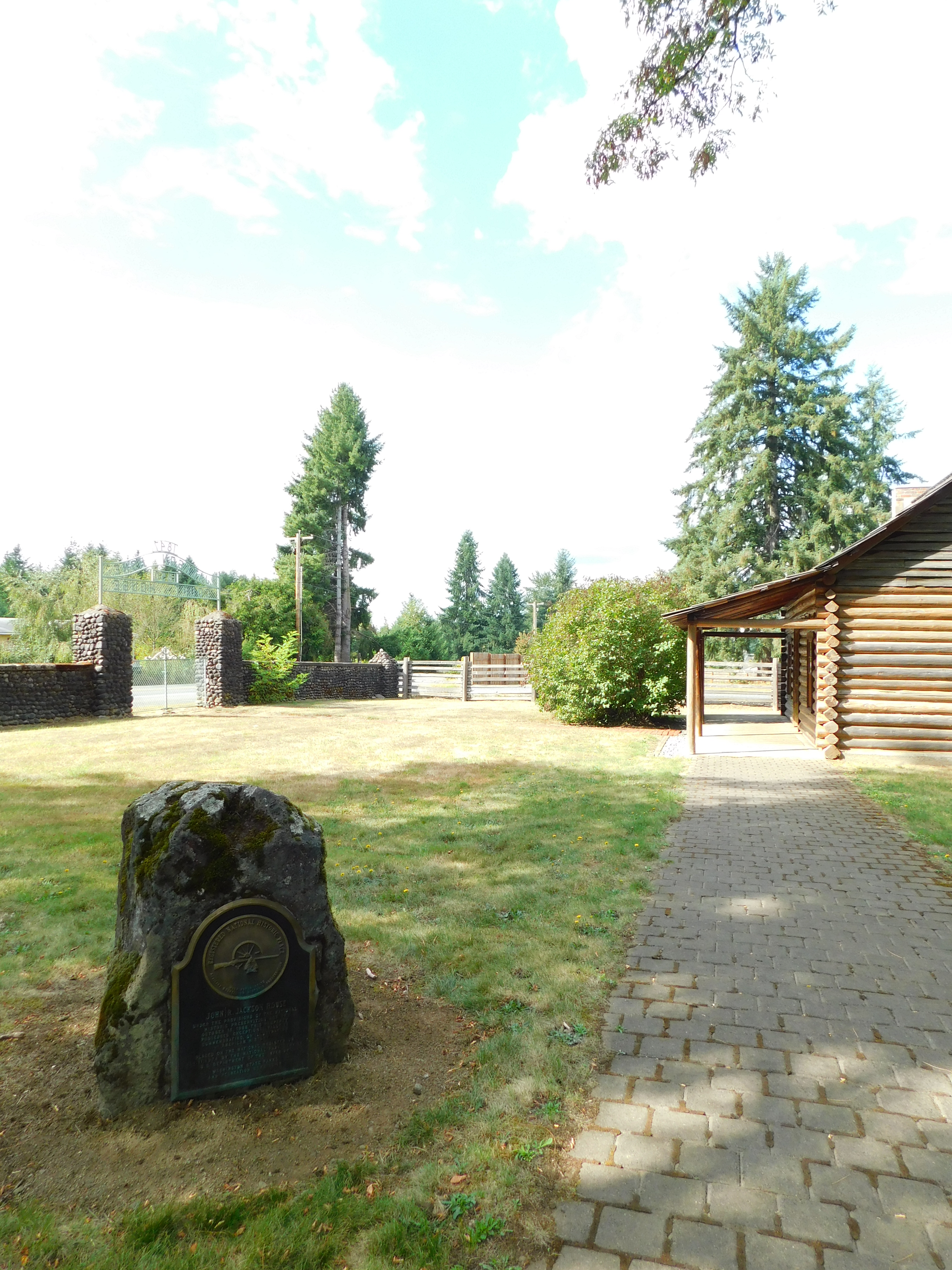
- Location: Mary's Corner on Jackson Highway
- NRHP reference No.: 74001968

Significant dates
- Added to NRHP: January 11, 1974
- Designated WSHR: January 16, 1973

Jackson House State Park Heritage Site is a 1.4-acre (0.57 ha) Washington state park centered around the John R. Jackson House, the restored homestead cabin of John R. and Matilda Jackson, who were among the first Euro-American settlers north of the Columbia River.

Known locally as the Jackson Courthouse, the site is located in Mary's Corner. The Lewis and Clark State Park lies directly south of the courthouse and the Matilda N. Jackson State Park Heritage Site is situated to the north.

The building is the oldest, physically existing courthouse in the state and became the second designated state park in Washington. The courthouse is recorded as holding the first court case in what would become the Washington Territory and being the first building to sustain preservation efforts in the state.

== History ==
=== Courthouse beginnings ===
After moving to the Oregon Territory in 1844 and marrying Matilda Nettle Glover Coontz in 1848, John originally built a small cabin in 1845, which became a focal point on the Cowlitz Trail, spanning from the Cowlitz River to Olympia, which was created shortly after Jackson's first home was constructed. He proceeded to construct a larger house for his family in 1850. The structure, built by John and four of Matilda's sons, was originally 16 by 26 feet and had an earthen floor.

The building became of use as a courthouse with the first case held on December 12, 1850. The court matter, a selection of jurors, was overseen by Federal Judge William R. Strong of Oregon and was the first case held north of the Columbia River. A group of delegates met at the courthouse to offer the first proposal to create the Washington Territory on October 27, 1852. (Note: A notice posted by a clerk mentions the first official court date was originally scheduled to be a day earlier, October 26, 1852.) The delegation agreed to a general convention, known later as the Monticello Convention.

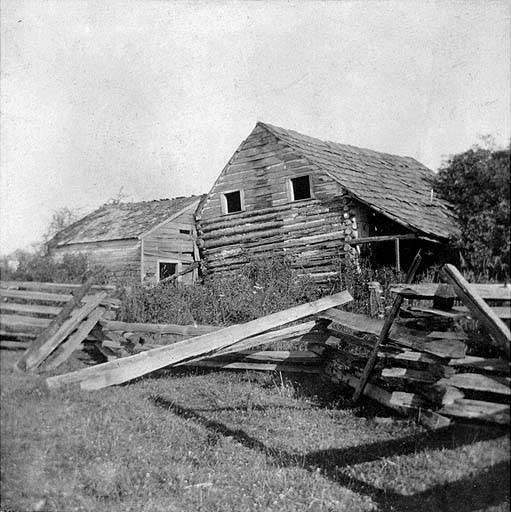
Deteriorated Jackson House, 1897

The courthouse was used as a post office beginning in 1854, the second such created in what would become Lewis County. The post office was listed under the name, Highland. The building was also used as a supply depot for troops journeying between military outposts in the area.

Matilda created a hotel on the homestead and in the 1850s, the family welcomed such guests as Ulysses S. Grant and Civil War generals, George McClellan and Philip Sheridan, as well as Isaac Stevens, the territory's first governor. Pioneer Ezra Meeker, on his excursion trip north to Puget Sound from the Oregon Territory in 1853, stopped at the homestead, resupplied along with a wagon by Jackson.

Jackson ordered cloth from San Francisco to be used for a United States flag after the formal announcement of the creation of the Washington Territory in 1853. The 6 ft × 15 ft (1.8 m × 4.6 m) banner featured only eight of the 13 stripes due to a lack of material. The flag, the first such in the new territory, was crafted by Matilda and other homesteaders from within the region. The flag was first flown on the courthouse grounds on July 4, 1853, the earliest recognized Fourth of July celebration in the newly formed boundary. As of 2025, the artifact remains as part of a Washington State Historical Society collection.

The Jackson family lived in the home unabated during this time, including almost a decade after John's death in 1873. Matilda moved into a newly constructed home on the grounds in 1882 and the courthouse went unused. By 1895, the courthouse was reported to be overgrown with myrtle and ivy and Matilda still living in the family house nearby.

=== 20th century preservation ===
The home fell into disrepair and in June 1915 local businessman and noted Chehalis pioneer, Augustine "Gus" Donahoe, purchased the cabin and surrounding land, deeding the property to the St. Helens Club of Chehalis, a women's literacy and civic group. Jacksons' granddaughter, Anna Koontz, and the St, Helens Club led restoration efforts beginning that same month; the renovation was considered the first restoration of an historical site in the state. On July 10, 1915, Donahoe donated the courthouse and a 2,000-square-foot (190 m^{2}) parcel to the Washington State Historical Society for use as a park. (Note: News reports vary the size of the parcel, either much larger or slightly smaller. Additionally, the transfer of the deed occurred in 1915, but the official date varies between June or July of that year. See sources listed in the section.) A 520-acre (210 ha) park was recommended by the state in 1922 that proposed to incorporate the Jackson site. The new grounds instead remained separate and became Lewis and Clark State Park.

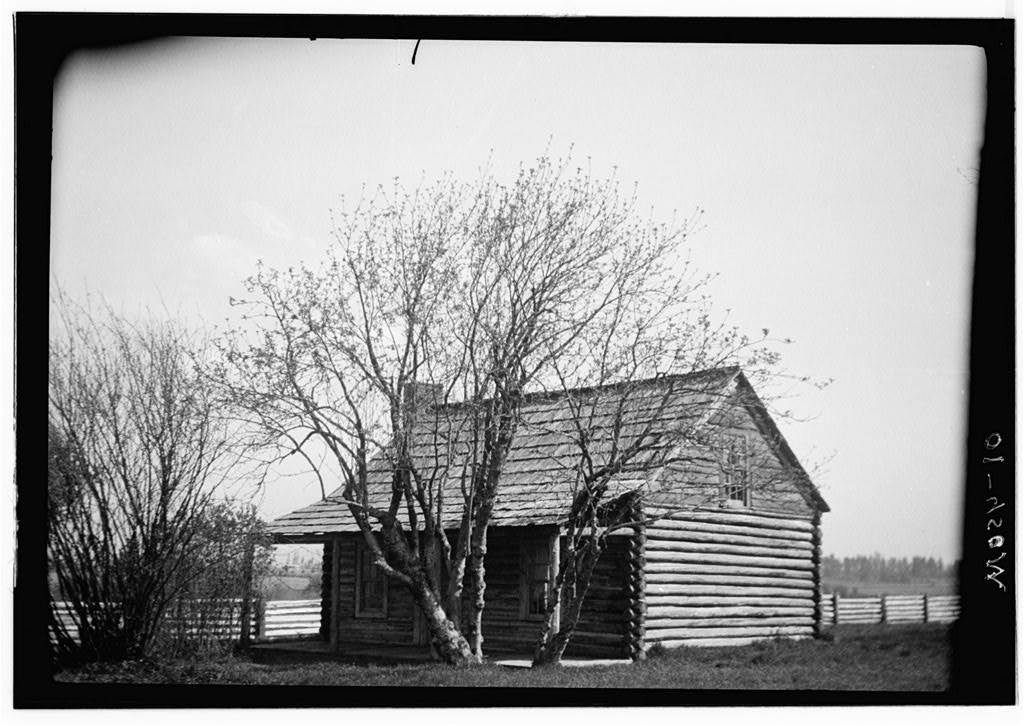
Jackson House, ca. 1930s

On October 21, 1922, the "Jackson prairie courthouse of territorial days" was formally dedicated. The courthouse was rehabilitated during a Civilian Conservation Corps project in 1934 and underwent a preservation project by the National Park Service (NPS) in 1936. In connection with the Cowlitz Trail, the courthouse was celebrated during a 100th anniversary celebration in 1945. The event included a pageant and commemorative booklet.

Additional restoration efforts by the Washington State Department of Archaeology and Historic Preservation were begun in 1950. Led once again by Anna Koontz, the preservation did not include renovations of any outbuildings or the barn. Considered a long-term project, it included the rebuild of the chimney and porch foundation, as well as replacing some logs in the structure and removing various types of graffiti.

=== 21st century ===
Another renovation was done to the grounds and building in 1995. A refurbishing of the cabin was undertaken and completed in 2017 at a cost of $150,000. The installation of pathways, interpretative panels, and a new fence were also part of the project, including the reinstallation of an archway from 1922.

Into the 21st century, several names have been applied to the site but the park is locally and commonly referred to as the Jackson Courthouse.

=== Validity of first courthouse status ===
Despite a record from October 4, 1847 regarding a county tax assessment roll that Jackson submitted from his home to the Lewis County commissioner board, researchers found earlier evidence that the home of Judge S.S. Ford on Ford's Prairie near Claquato, Washington may have been the first courthouse in Washington state. A record of the first meeting to initiate government in the territory, as well as a documented district court proceeding, exists from earlier in 1847. A federal judge, due to travel difficulty over the muddy terrain around Chehalis and Claquato, ordered court documents transferred to the Jackson Courthouse and any further proceedings to take place on Jackson Prairie. The Ford courthouse, described as "a shelf behind the store of Judge Ford's home", was destroyed and the location considered lost.

=== John R. Jackson ===
John was born January 13, 1800, in Staindrop, England. He immigrated to the United States in 1823, living in New York and eventually migrating west to Illinois where he began his first homestead. Jackson arrived in Oregon during late 1844 after a pioneering trek. In early 1845, intrigued by reports of rushing waters of the Deschutes River, he journeyed north where he continued to the Newaukum and Chehalis rivers. He claimed a prairie on a high plain near the Cowlitz Trail, and it became the homestead known as "The Highlands". The Jackson family was one of the first non-indigenous settlers north of the Columbia River.

Jackson was the inaugural tax assessor in Lewis County in 1846 and the county's first elected sheriff the following year. He served as one of 44 delegates at the Monticello Convention which led to the creation of the Washington Territory. His role as a public servant continued, serving as a judge, tax collector, and as a Washington Territory representative during his time at the homestead; his duties supplemented by also working as a census worker and as a local butcher. John died at the courthouse on May 5, 1873. (Note: Other notices of Jackson's death record his date as May 25, 1873.)

== State park and heritage status ==
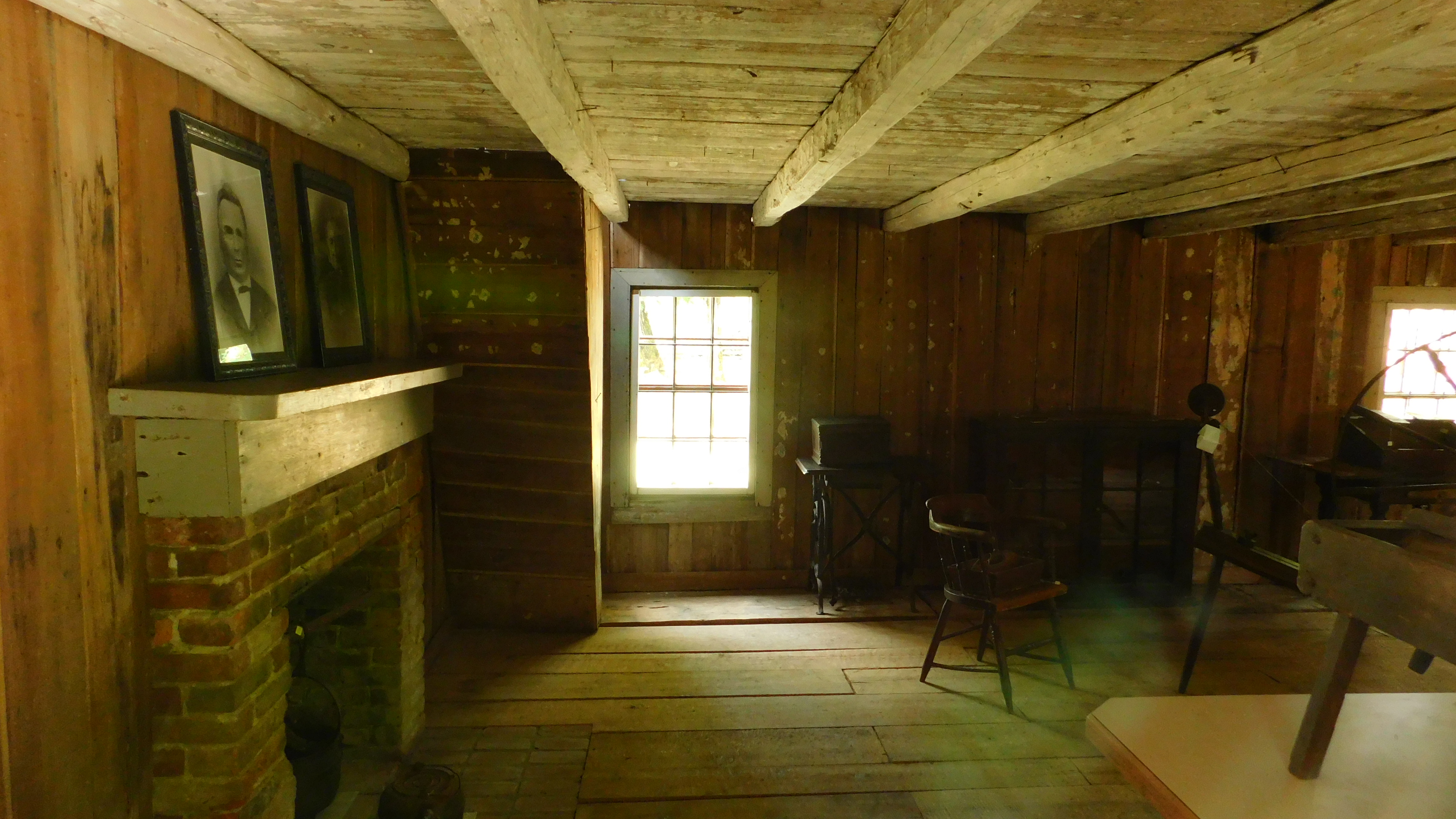
Interior of the John R. Jackson courthouse

The Washington State Board of Park Commissioners accepted the Jackson House as one of Washington's first two state parks at the first meeting of the Commission on November 22, 1915. (Note: The courthouse joined Larrabee State Park, then known as Chuckanut State Park, as the first state parks in Washington.) The park was added to the National Register of Historic Places (NRHP) in 1974, however it was under review until additional documentation regarding the history of the courthouse could be found. A 2016 supplementary review of the heritage status discovered additional historical information on the house, increasing the revised file ten-fold. The site was relisted on the NRHP in 2017 citing the courthouse's significance during the pre-automobile era and its role as a rest stop, the pioneering history of the Jackson family, and the connection the homestead has to the St. Helen's Club and other women's organizations.

The site was added to the Washington State Register of Historic Places, via the state's Advisory Council of Historic Preservation, in January 1973. A dedication ceremony, recognizing a relisting of the home by the Washington State Heritage Register took place in 2017.

In 1975, the Lewis County Commissioners board approved a resolution to trade Mayfield Lake County Park to Washington in exchange for the Jackson House, the Matilda Jackson site, and the Lewis and Clark State Park. The proposal, which did not come to fruition, was based on visitation numbers of Lewis County residents being overwhelmingly less at the county-owned Mayfield park as compared to the three state-operated parks in Mary's Corner.

The building is the oldest, physically existing courthouse in the state. The 2017 relisting by the NRHP recorded the Jackson Courthouse as being the first building to undergo preservation in the state.

== Geography ==
The courthouse sits in what was known as Jackson Prairie in Mary's Corner off Jackson Highway. Named after the site in 1966, the Jackson Highway, stretching from Chehalis to Toledo, was once part of U.S. Route 99. To the north of the Jackson Courthouse is the Matilda N. Jackson State Park Heritage Site and directly south is Lewis and Clark State Park.

== Site description ==
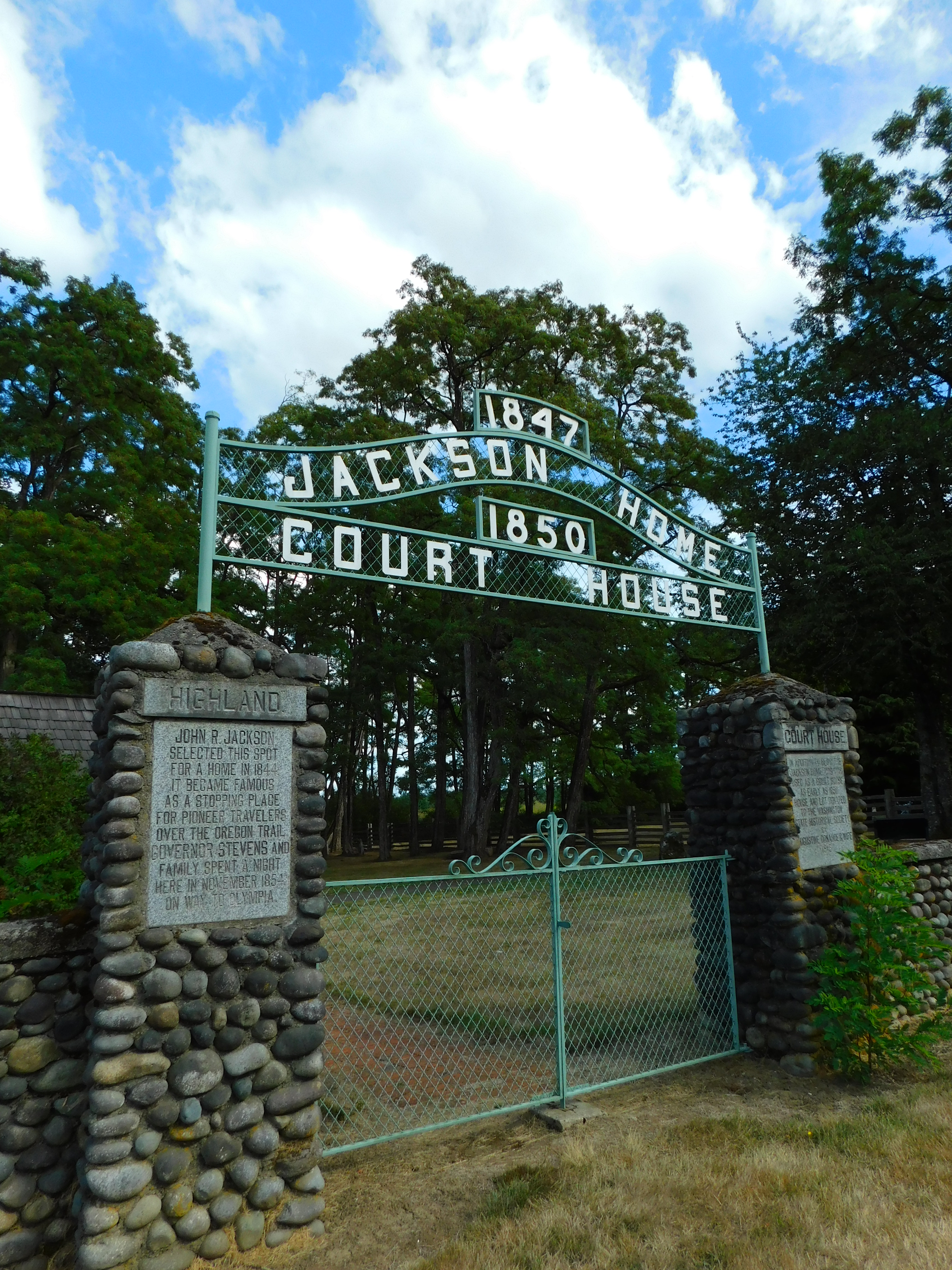
Entrance gate to the courthouse

The courthouse, with recorded dimensions of 16 ft × 26 ft (4.9 m × 7.9 m) by 1921, is a log-cabin, two-story structure and when first built, did not contain any windows but included a large, covered porch. The building is considered to be mostly a reconstruction due to the courthouse largely being razed during the 1915 restoration. However, some parts of the original building remain and the main staircase, essentially a ladder, was kept and exists in the present day. The fireplace had crumbled but was rebuilt of brick. The work also decreased the height of the courthouse as well as the pitch of the roof. A cobblestone wall and archway, including a plaque, was added in 1922 during improvements completed by the Washington State Historical Society. Flanking inscription panels were carved by a Tacoma contractor. The archway was removed at some point but rebuilt during the 2017 renovation.

The site is flat, slightly forested, and fenced. The grounds contain a walking path and minor picnic amenities.

== See also ==
- Lewis and Clark State Park (Washington)
- Matilda N. Jackson State Park Heritage Site
