= Fred Moyer =

Canadian politician

Frederick Clare Moyer (November 6, 1887 – May 21, 1951) was a politician from Alberta, Canada. He served 5 years as an Independent member of the Legislative Assembly of Alberta.

Moyer was elected in the 1930 Alberta general election defeating two other Independent Candidates and defeating Archibald Key running under the Labor banner on vote transfers in a hotly contested race.

In the 1935 Alberta general election Moyer was defeated and came in a distant second in a landslide by Herbert Ingrey from the Alberta Social Credit Party.

Legislative Assembly of Alberta
Preceded by New District	MLA Drumheller; 1930–1935	Succeeded by Herbert Ingrey
