= Parks and recreation in Centralia, Washington =

Parks and recreation in Centralia, Washington, United States, is administered by the Centralia Parks and Recreation Department (CPRD). The agency oversees a variety of sites, including natural areas, community recreation facilities, and city parks, classified as either neighborhood or community. The department also oversees several single-purpose sites in the city and partners with the Washington Department of Fish and Wildlife (WDFW) on maintenance and improvements to several areas, including Hayes and Plummer lakes. Centralia hosts privately owned parks and there are some trails under volunteer oversight.

== History ==
Centralia's first organized park and recreation plan began in 1963 and the agency has had plans to create a trail corridor system to link the parks in the community. In 2024, the city incorporated a program known as the Hub City Greenway initiative, a plan to connect neighborhood paths and nature trails already existing in Centralia to each other, linking the system with parks, schools, and other districts and important sites within the community. The project is backed by a technical assistance grant from the Thriving Communities Program via the U.S. Department of Transportation (USDOT). Centralia was one of 52 communities in the United States to receive the grant.

As of 2024, Centralia Parks and Recreation Department had an operating budget of $2.5 million, and employed 161 people.

== Parks ==
=== Neighborhood parks ===
Centralia classifies most parks under 10 acres (4.0 ha), and within residential areas, as a neighborhood park.

Name	Image	Established	Location	Size	Description
Brick Wagner Park		1929	Plummer Lake - 317 Tilley Drive	0.28 acres (0.11 ha)	A small park, expanded twice in 1934 and 1974, that provides boating and fishing access to Plummer Lake. Named after Walter "Brick" Wagner, a long-serving park board member, his nickname was due to his red hair.
Cedar Street Park		1969	Centralia College - 310 S. Cedar Street	0.83 acres (0.34 ha)	Located in a neighborhood next to the college, it contains courts, playgrounds, and open grass areas. The grounds were replanted with shade trees in 2009. The city traded the parcel to the college in 2017 in exchange for tennis courts. As part of the trade, the park must remain unchanged until 2027 and the college will have total control of the grounds in 2037.
Central Park		1970	Downtown District - 215 North Tower Ave	0.03 acres (0.012 ha)	The pocket park was once the site of a condemned office building, becoming a city park when it was acquired and the site renovated. The Centralia Downtown Association took over the responsibilities of the area in 2016.
Gold Street Tennis Courts		2017	Downtown District - 270 S Gold Street	0.69 acres (0.28 ha)	An agreed exchanged with Centralia College for Cedar Park, the area was converted into a mixed-use site, especially for tennis and pickleball.
Logan Park		1994	Edison District - 1411 Logan Street	1.91 acres (0.77 ha)	A neighborhood park, originally known as Logan Community Park, is owned by the school district. It is leased to the city and contains ball courts, a playground, and picnic amenities.
Veterans Memorial Community Park		2024	Downtown District - 505 N Pearl St	0.91 acres (0.37 ha)	Once the home of the 1950s Veterans Memorial Pearl Street Pool, shuttered in 2011 and filled in 2023, the new park is planned to encompass the existing Pearl Street Memorial Plaza, which includes the Splash Pad, as well as additions for sports and playground areas and other amenities.

=== Community parks ===
Centralia classifies most parks between 10 acres (4.0 ha) and 100 acres (40 ha) as a community park, provided that the area contains a variety of leisure activities, such as sports, hiking, or picnicking. The classification also includes grounds at Centralia Middle School, Centralia High School, and Centralia College, but not elementary school recreation areas. School park areas are not under oversight of the CPRD, but in a cooperative partnership with the education systems to help expand or maintain the land, especially if the school grounds are adjacent to a city park.

Name	Image	Established	Location	Size	Description
Fort Borst Park		1900	West District - 2020 Borst Avenue	121.0 acres (49.0 ha)	The multi-use park contains sports fields, picnic areas, trails, access to water features, and historic buildings. The grounds also hosts the Borst Park Dog Park.
George Washington Park		1881	Downtown District - 110 S. Pearl Street	2.0 acres (0.81 ha)	The park contains several memorials, with a sculpture bench of Centralia's founder, George Washington, plus an honorary plaque near the center of the grounds. The grounds are used for several events, contains a gazebo, and is home to the city library. The park was created during the original platting of the city.
Rotary-Riverside Park		1983	Shopping District - 313 Lowe Street	14.05 acres (5.69 ha)	The grounds were once owned and maintained by the local Rotary Club. The park contains ballfields, playground and picnic amenities, and provides access to the Skookumchuck River. It is also home to the 44,000-square-foot (4,100 m^{2}) Fuller's Twin City Skate Park, which opened in 2004, and a nine-hole disc golf course.

== Natural areas and open space corridors ==
The classification covers areas in a more natural setting, with recreational activities geared toward hiking or exploration. (Note: Additional areas include an annex at Fort Borst Park, the Grand Property, city oversight of Plummer Lake, the Sunrise Estates Open Area, and cooperative management of Hayes Lake with the WDFW.)

Name	Image	Established	Location	Size	Description
Agnew Mill Pond (China Creek) Park		2013	China Creek - 1001 N Gold Street	28.22 acres (11.42 ha) (Agnew) 22.48 acres (9.10 ha) (China Creek)	Undeveloped riparian wetlands, the Agnew parcel was donated anonymously to the city. The combined grounds are used as part of a flood control measure in association with the China Creek Flood Project.
Bridge Street Park			Hayes Lake - 123 W. Bridge Street	2.7 acres (1.1 ha)	An undeveloped waterfront park, visitors can access Hayes Lake. The area contains various species of ducks and other birds, including bald eagles and cormorants.
Ed S. Mayes Landscape Bed		1910	Edison District - 1219 W. 1st Street	0.03 acres (0.012 ha)	Located at the original gateway to the city near the Skookumchuck River, the landscaped area is planted with rhododendrons.
Gold Street Overpass		1968	South Centralia - Gold Street and Kresky Avenue Overpass	1.23 acres (0.50 ha)	An open space and natural area, with a dog park added in 2023, it surrounds an overpass from the southern entrance from SR 507 into downtown.
Plummer Lake Boat Launch		1995	Plummer Lake - 1520 Lewis Street	0.4 acres (0.16 ha)	Situated on state land overseen by the WDFW, the area provides another point of non-motorized boat access to the lake.
Prairie Estates Park			Coffee Creek District - 525 W. Prairie Rose Street	2.2 acres (0.89 ha)	Undeveloped wetland area.
Seminary Hill Natural Area		1960s	East Centralia - 902 E. Locust Street	82.6 acres (33.4 ha)	Once the location of a seminary, the park, consisting of two parcels, contains over 2.0 miles (3.2 km) of trails through mixed forest.
Washington Street Park			Downtown District - Washington Street at Park Street	0.06 acres (0.024 ha)	An open area believed to be the location of the original home of Centralia's founder, George Washington.
Wilbur Parkins Park		1972	Skookumchuck River at Meridian Avenue	6.13 acres (2.48 ha)	Expanded in 1990, it was once known as Crescent Park. Used mostly for fishing, the area underwent a 2005 wetland restoration that removed invasive species.
Woodland Park				3.31 acres (1.34 ha)	Located in a flood zone, the parcel is required to remain as an open space.

== Private parks ==
Name	Image	Established	Location	Size	Description
Floral Park Sustainability Project		2024 (Note: A grand opening of Floral Park was held in July 2024 but an official start date is not known.)	Lewis County Transfer Station - 103 East Floral St		A sustainability demonstration park project under the Washington State University-Lewis County Master Recycler Composter program, volunteers oversee the reduction and reuse of potential biologic and landfill waste. The site provides a tool library.
Hubbub Pocket Sculpture Park (Note: Hubbub Park has had various names since its inception, including Hub City Art Park, and is also known under the nickname, "Hub Cap". The Hub Bub name is often written as one word and in full capitalization.)		2011	Downtown District - 501 N Tower Ave		A privately owned space in a parking lot, the park contains sculptures primarily created by local artists. The largest artwork, Shatkona, used to reside at the Monarch Contemporary Art Center and Sculpture Park.

== Recreation areas ==
Name	Image	Established	Location	Size	Description
Bob Peters Field		2023	Centralia Community College campus	4.0 acres (1.6 ha)	Named after a long-serving athletic director at the school, the complex contains fields for baseball, soccer, and softball.
Centralia Community Pool		1970s	West District - 910 Johnson Rd	Indoor facility	Ultimately replacing the Veteran's Memorial Pearl Street Pool, the facility is run under a joint contract between the city, the school district, and a local fitness company. First priority for usage is given to children and school-related activities.
Cooks Hill Courts		2026 (Note: While the Cooks Hill Court opened in 2026, a court had previously existed at the grounds. The site was used previously for pickleball by nearby residents and for bonfires.)	Cooks Hill District - 2400 Cooks Hill Road	Outdoor facility	A covered facility constructed primarily for pickleball, the court is located next to Cooks Hill Community Church, owners of the property. The church has stated that the court is to be a "neighborhood community facility", non-affiliated, and open via membership.
Pearl Street Memorial Plaza (Splash Pad)		2017	Downtown District - 539 N. Pearl Street	0.91 acres (0.37 ha)	A spray park built as a remembrance to those who served in the military.

== Special facilities ==
Under the CPRD, several buildings or locations are considered a special facility. Classified as a single-purpose location, this includes such sites as the Armory Hills Golf Course, the Centralia Train Depot, the First Street trees, and the Sticklin Greenwood Cemetery and Washington Lawn Cemetery. The classification also includes historical buildings and sites within Fort Borst Park.

== Trails ==
Several parks and natural areas contain hiking trails of various surfaces and difficulty.

=== Discovery Trail ===
The largest trail that is not connected to a park is the Discovery Trail, a level 1.5-mile (2.4 km) path located on what was once a homestead. It traverses through restored riparian habitat that parallels the Chehalis River. Opened in 2006 after fourth graders from Centralia began planting trees, it is located north of Centralia in Ford's Prairie. Volunteer efforts that continue to include local student involvement have replanted the area since the path's early beginnings. The trail is overseen by the city and is part of a habitat conservation easement owned by the Chehalis River Basin Land Trust.

The repaired ecosystem is home to a variety of wildlife, including beaver, deer, and eagles. Vegetation includes Douglas fir, horsetail, and a non-native plant, hopbush, thought to be spread remnants of hop fields that once populated the surrounding farm valleys.

== Future plans ==
The parks system has long been planned to be linked by a trail corridor, allowing residents and visitors access to a variety of recreation opportunities. Expansion of existing parks, including upgrades, have taken precedence in the 21st century, including emphasis on retaining or reinvigorating historically important concerns with the park system.

== See also ==
- List of parks and recreation in Lewis County, Washington
- List of Washington state parks
- Parks and recreation in Chehalis, Washington
