= Lewis and Clark Bridge =

Lewis and Clark Bridge may refer to:

- Lewis and Clark Bridge (Wolf Point, Montana), bridge spanning the Missouri River built in 1930
- Lewis and Clark Bridge (Columbia River), bridge spanning the Columbia River between Oregon and Washington
- Lewis and Clark Bridge (Ohio River), connecting the eastern part of Louisville, Kentucky to Clark County, Indiana
- Lewis and Clark River Bridge, bridge spanning the Lewis and Clark River, in Clatsop County, Oregon
- Lewis and Clark Viaduct previously the Intercity Viaduct, automobile and pedestrian crossing of the Kansas River in the United States; is where Interstate 70 begins in Missouri.

== See also ==
- Lewis and Clark (disambiguation)
- Meriwether Lewis
- William Clark
- Lewis and Clark Expedition
