= Lewis Clarke (disambiguation) =

Lewis Clarke (c. 1812–1897) was American former slave, author, and lecturer.

Lewis Clarke may also refer to:

- Lewis Clarke (priest), Archdeacon of Llandaff, Wales, from 1977 to 1988
- Lewis J. Clarke (1927–2021), English-American landscape architect

== See also ==
- Lewis Clark (disambiguation)
