= Herbert Ingrey =

Canadian politician

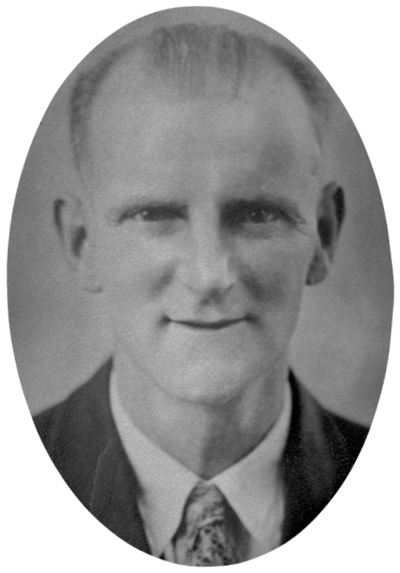

Member of the Legislative Assembly of Alberta
- In office 1935–1940
- Preceded by: Fred Moyer
- Succeeded by: Gordon Taylor
- Constituency: Drumheller

Personal details
- Born: May 22, 1872 Leyton, Essex, England
- Died: January 31, 1968 (aged 81) Edmonton, Alberta, Canada
- Party: Social Credit
- Occupation: businessman, contractor, politician

Herbert Ingrey (December 9, 1886 – January 31, 1968) was a politician from Alberta, Canada. He was born at Leyton.

Herbert was elected in the 1935 Alberta general election for the Alberta Social Credit Party defeating Independent incumbent Fred Moyer.

Herbert served one term in the Legislative Assembly of Alberta as a back bencher, not reoffering in the 1940 Alberta general election.

Legislative Assembly of Alberta
Preceded by Fred Moyer	MLA Drumheller; 1935–1940	Succeeded by Gordon Taylor
