= Lewis and Clark Highway =

Lewis and Clark Highway may refer to:

- Lewis and Clark Trail, a named highway approximating the path of Lewis and Clark in 1804-1806
- Lewis and Clark Highway (Montana), a named highway in Montana

Lewis and Clark Highway may also refer to:

- Lewis and Clark National Historic Trail, a route roughly marking the path of Lewis and Clark's journey
- Northwest Passage Scenic Byway, a scenic byway in Idaho
- Lewis and Clark Back Country Byway, a scenic byway in Idaho
- Sacajawea Historic Byway, a scenic byway in Idaho
- Sakakawea Scenic Byway, a scenic byway in North Dakota
- Lewis & Clark Scenic Byway, a scenic byway in Nebraska

== See also ==
- Lewis and Clark (disambiguation)
