= Matilda N. Jackson State Park Heritage Site =

Washington state park

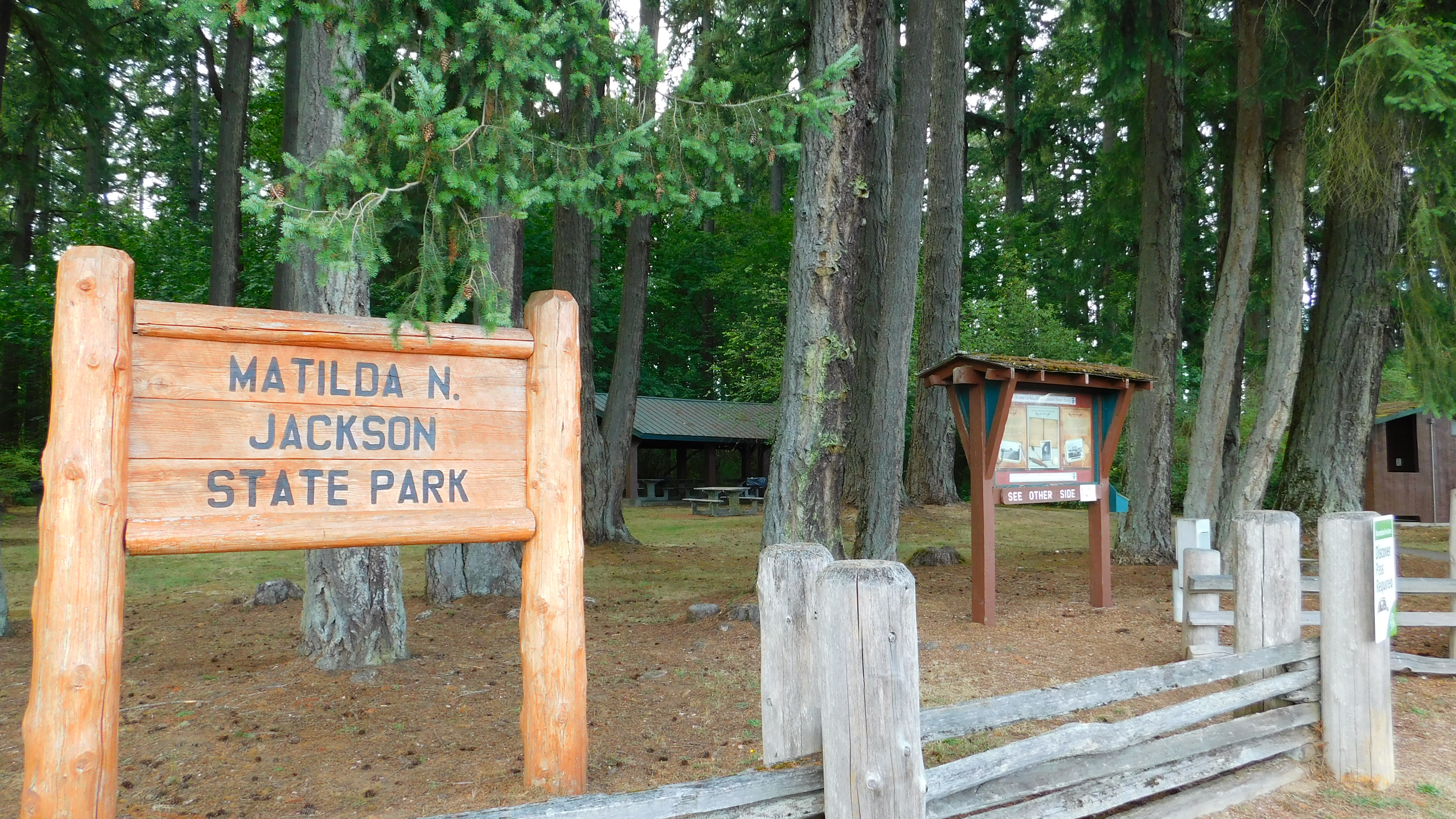
- Entrance to the park

- Location within Washington (state)
- Location: Mary's Corner, Washington
- Coordinates: 46°32′55″N 122°49′24″W
- Area: 5.0 acres (2.0 ha)
- Etymology: Named after homesteader, Matilda Jackson
- Administrator: Washington State Parks and Recreation Commission
- Visitors: 23,436 (in 1987-2007)
- Hiking trails: 0.25 miles (0.40 km)
- Designation: Washington state park

Matilda N. Jackson State Park Heritage Site is a 5.0-acre (2.0 ha) state park in Mary's Corner, Washington. Named after a pioneering homesteader, it is one of the few parks in the Washington State Park system named after a woman.

== History ==
The park began in 1917 as a land donation from Matilda's daughter, Louisa Audre Ware. Ware, who bestowed the grounds the prior year, requested the park be named in honor of her mother and that the premises was to be used as a "comfort station". The Civilian Conservation Corps built a covered shelter during the 1930s.

Among the areas under Washington State Park oversight, the park is considered one of the oldest on record in the state and one of the few named after a woman. As part of the original donation, the park must always be used as a "waystation", restricting the state from selling the parcel.

=== Matilda Jackson ===
Matilda Koontz (Glover) was born January 29, 1811, in Maryland. Her family traveled to Missouri due to a combination of the Glover family's animus towards slavery and an increase in economic status. She married Nicolas Koontz (Note: The last name of Koontz is spelled in various ways, such as Coonse or Coontz, based on the source. Jackson's first name is often spelled as Mathilda. See sourcing throughout the article for the discrepancies.) in 1837 in Missouri. The Koontz family, in search of prosperity on the open frontier, began a pioneer journey on the Oregon Trail in 1847; Nicolas perished due to drowning in the Snake River. Before reaching The Dalles, Oregon, she was briefly held by an indigenous tribe.

Upon arriving in Oregon City in the Oregon Territory, she married John R. Jackson in 1848 and they settled in Highland Prairie (also Highland Farm), eventually known as Mary's Corner, Washington. The pair built up the property which included the Jackson Courthouse, the first such building in what would become the Washington Territory. Matilda created a hotel on the homestead and along with other women in the area, created the first flag that represented the newly created Washington Territory. Matilda lived on the homestead for nearly five decades.

Matilda, over the course of her two marriages, gave birth to six sons and a daughter who lived beyond infancy, losing three of her sons between 1855 and 1861. She also suffered an early birth, and subsequent death, of a daughter after Nicolas's death during their Oregon Trail crossing. She was given several monikers, such as "Grandma Jackson" and "Washington Territory's Grand Lady", due to her hostess nature as well as her entertaining of government officials. Jackson was host to such visitors as Ulysses S. Grant and Civil War generals, George McClellan and Philip Sheridan. Matilda died on February 14, 1901, at the age of 89 and is buried along with her husband, John Jackson, and several of her children at Fern Hill Cemetery in Chehalis, Washington.

As part of an outdoor education initiative in 2016 led by the state's Junior Ranger Program, a mascot known as the "Matilda the snowshoe hare" was named in honor of Matilda. The Lewis County commissioner board declared October 26, 2019, which coincided with a release of a biography of Matilda, as "Matilda Jackson Legacy Day".

== Features ==
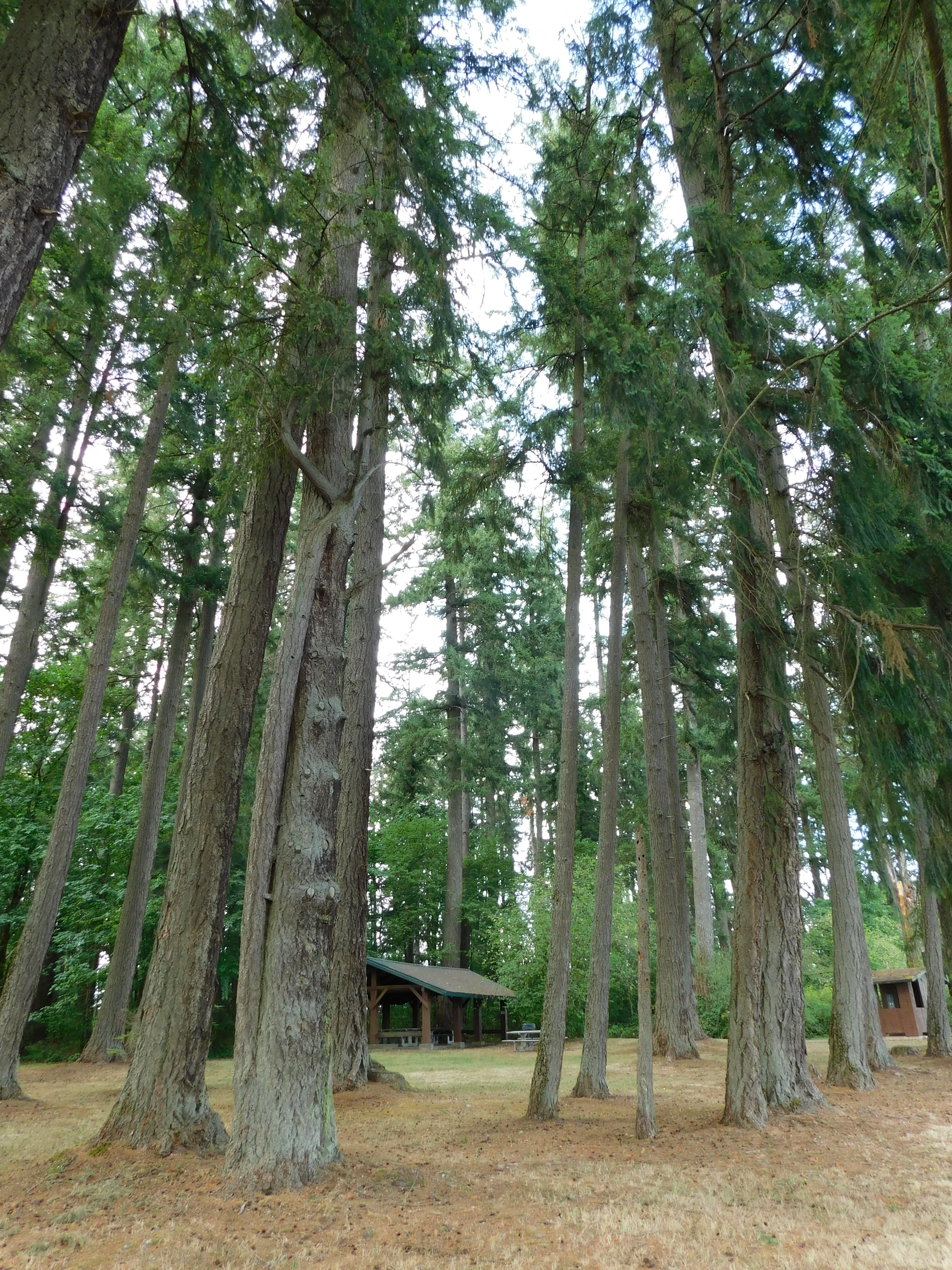
Grounds of the heritage site

The park is a day-use area with a covered picnic shelter and other picnic amenities. The forested site contains the only remaining Douglas fir trees in the area. A small trail, listed as 0.25 miles (0.40 km) in length, loops through the wooded area and there is a monument erected by the Daughters of the American Revolution that memorializes the pioneer Cowlitz Trail.

== See also ==
- Jackson House State Park Heritage Site
