= Jackson Prairie Underground Natural Gas Storage Facility =

Natural gas storage facility

Coordinates: 46°32′05″N 122°50′15″W

Jackson Prairie Underground Natural Gas Storage Facility is a natural gas storage facility in Southwest Washington. The site is owned by Puget Sound Energy, Avista and Williams Companies's Northwest Pipeline GP. With 25 billion cubic feet working capacity (47 billion cubic feet total capacity), it is the largest natural gas-storage reservoir in the Pacific Northwest and the 14th largest in the United States.

== Geology ==
Located in the community of Mary's Corner, Washington, the gas storage is in an aquifer contained by the sandstone Skookumchuck formation, about 1,000 to 3,000 feet underground.

== Development and operations ==
The site was first explored for gas production in 1958 with an 8,000-foot (2,400 m) deep well. The well turned out to be a dry hole and repurposed for gas storage. In 1964 the first gas was injected. Gas began escaping in early 1965 after the drilling of a new bore hole, requiring the installation of specialized fittings to shut off the leak. Despite a minor evacuation, a no fire order, and law enforcement patrols, no explosion or injuries occurred.

The stored gas comes from fields located in Canada and the Rocky Mountains. By 2001, the facility provided 40% of the gas during peak winter heat demand for PSE customers. As of 2016, there were a total of 104 wells, 55 being used for gas injection or extraction.
