= Klein Bicycle Corporation =

American bicycle manufacturer

Klein Bikes
- Founded: 1977; 49 years ago
- Founder: Gary Klein
- Defunct: 2009; 17 years ago
- Headquarters: Chehalis, Washington
- Products: Bicycles
- Parent: Trek Bicycle Corporation

Klein was a bicycle company founded by Gary Klein that pioneered the use of large diameter aluminium alloy tubes for greater stiffness and lower weight.

Klein produced his first bicycle frames while a student at the Massachusetts Institute of Technology during the 1970s, and full production runs of frames began in the 1980s. In 1995 the company was purchased by the Trek Bicycle Corporation, and the original Klein factory at Chehalis, Washington, closed in 2002 as production moved to the Trek headquarters at Waterloo, Wisconsin. Widespread distribution in the United States stopped in 2007, and ceased altogether in the rest of the world in 2009.

== History ==
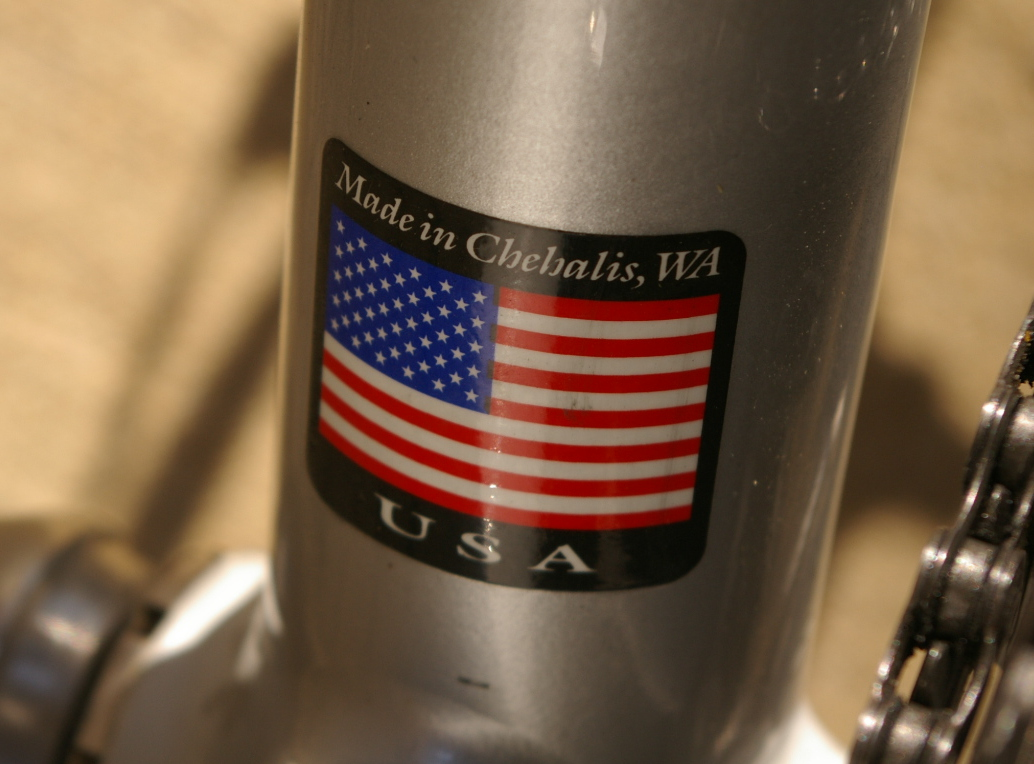
Seat tube badge on a Klein Quantum

Gary Klein, born June 9, 1952 (age 74), attended the University of California at Davis before transferring to the Massachusetts Institute of Technology (MIT). During the Independent Activities Period in 1973, a group of students including Klein worked together under Professor Buckley to produce an aluminum framed bicycle. After analyzing a number of contemporary steel frames, and examining ones that had broken in use, they were able to determine the stresses placed on a bicycle frame. Faced with limited available types of aluminum alloy tubing, the students chose to construct frames from 6061 aluminium alloy seamless drawn tube; alternatives such as the stronger 7075 aluminum alloy were discarded because of the tubing dimensions.

After graduating from MIT in 1974 with a degree in chemical engineering, Klein took a business course for entrepreneurs. As a keen road racer, in 1975, he started a business project with three other people and built a limited run of aluminum alloy framed bikes at the MIT Innovation Center, using a US$20,000 (equivalent to $120,000 in 2025) grant provided by MIT and US$1,000 of capital from each partner. The prototypes, with larger diameter tubes and thinner walls than those produced in 1973, were displayed at the International cycle show in New York in February 1975.

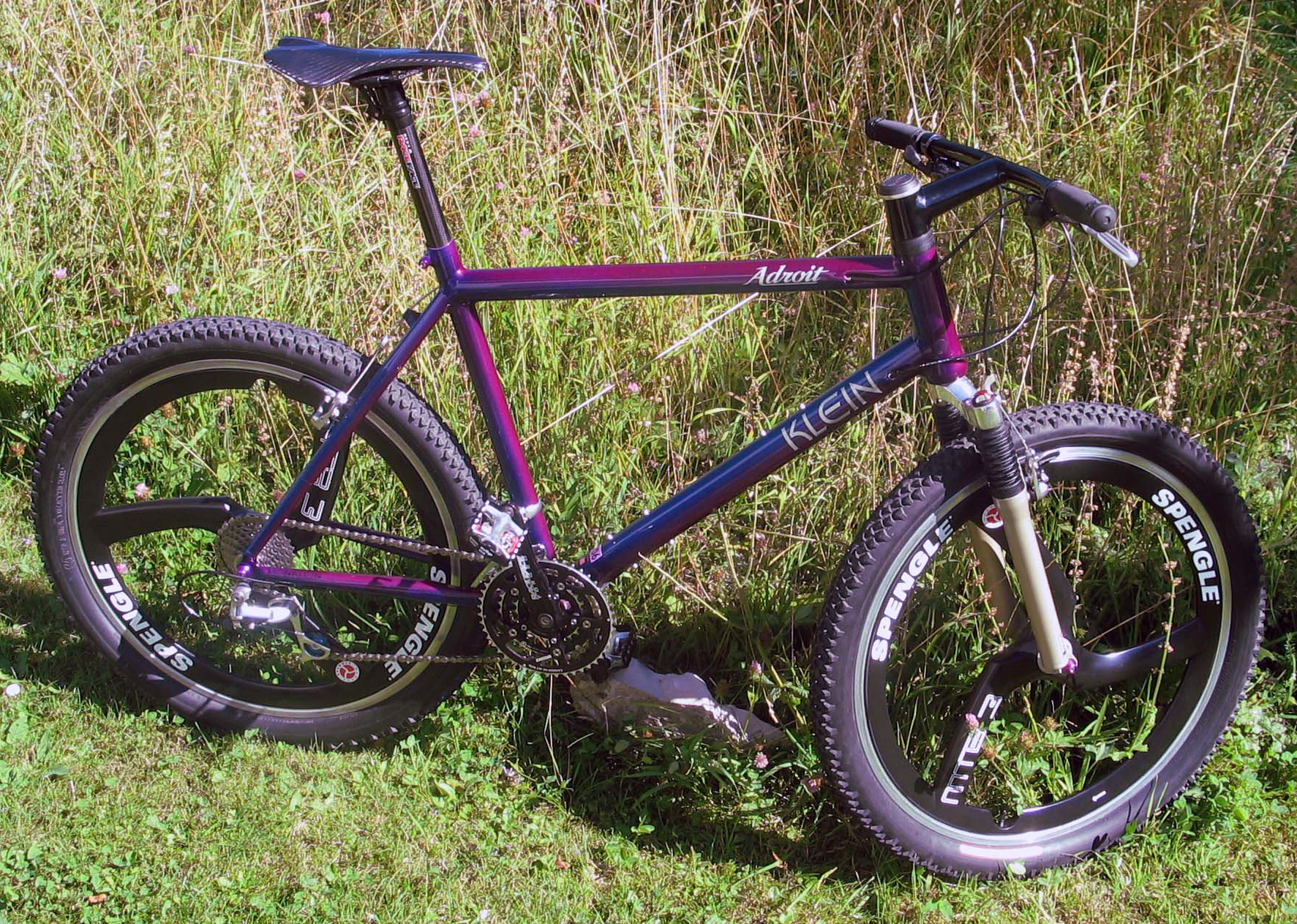
A Klein Adroit in Burgundy Blue

The next year, he relocated to some disused buildings on his parents' farm in San Martin, California, that had previously been used for dehydrating prunes. In 1977, he patented use of large diameter aluminum alloy tubes to increase stiffness, and in 1980, he moved from San Jose, California, to Chehalis, Washington. He started production runs of road bicycles in the early 1980s and mountain bikes in the mid-1980s.

In the formative beginnings of the Klein Bicycle Corporation, the company began building bicycles out of a barn in Mary's Corner, a small community south of Chehalis, starting in 1981. The company opened a 14,000 square feet (1,300 m^{2}) factory plant in the town that was expanded to 70,000 square feet (6,500 m^{2}).

In 1995, Trek bought Klein bikes, after Klein found it hard to compete without the sales network of a larger company in place. At its peak, around 250 people worked at the Chehalis plant, but operations gradually moved to the main Trek factory in Wisconsin. In 2001, a workforce of around 70 people produced 15,000 to 20,000 frames a year. In 2002, all production moved to the Trek headquarters at Waterloo, Wisconsin and the Mary's Corner manufacturing site closed that same year. Bikes were still sold under the Klein name until around 2009 in Japan, but widespread distribution ceased circa 2007 in the United States.

== Innovations ==
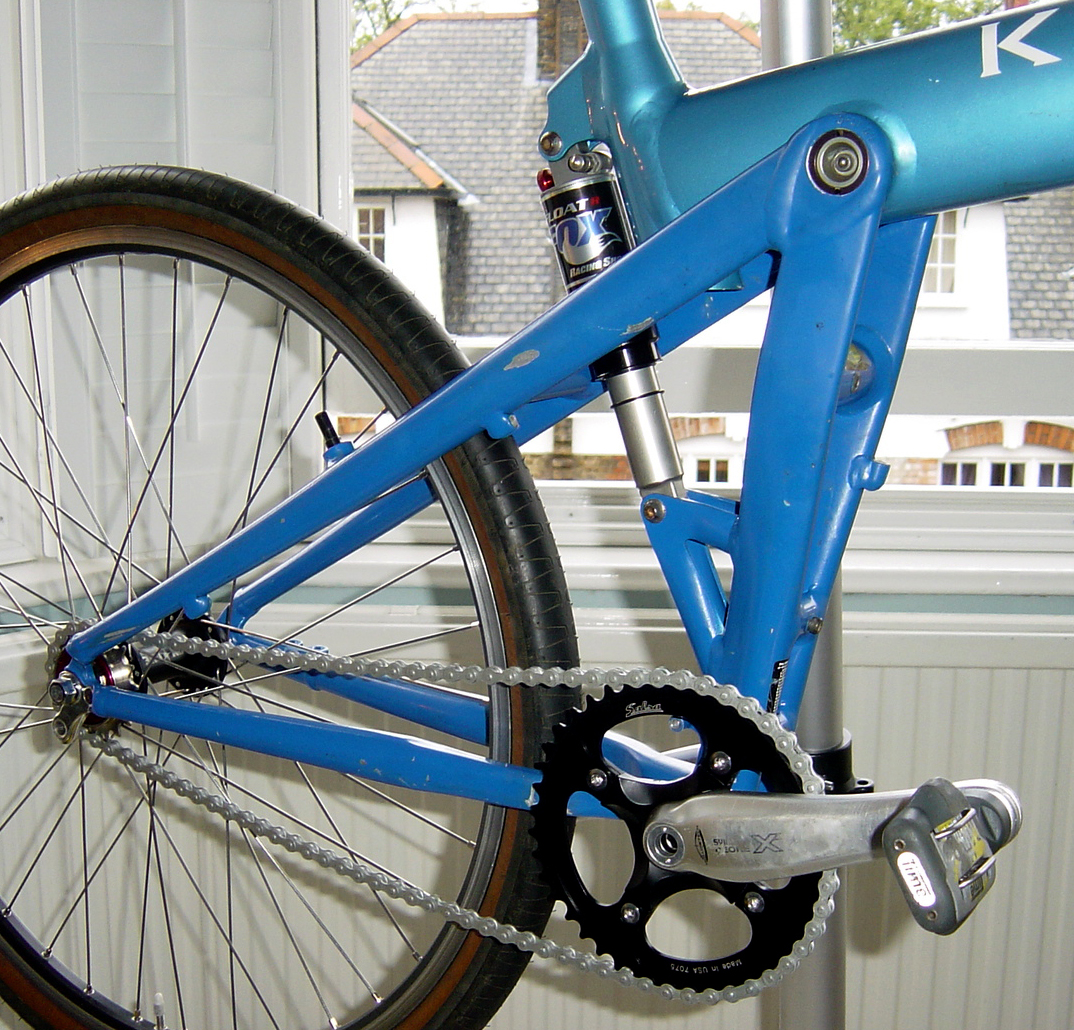
Rear triangle of a Klein Mantra

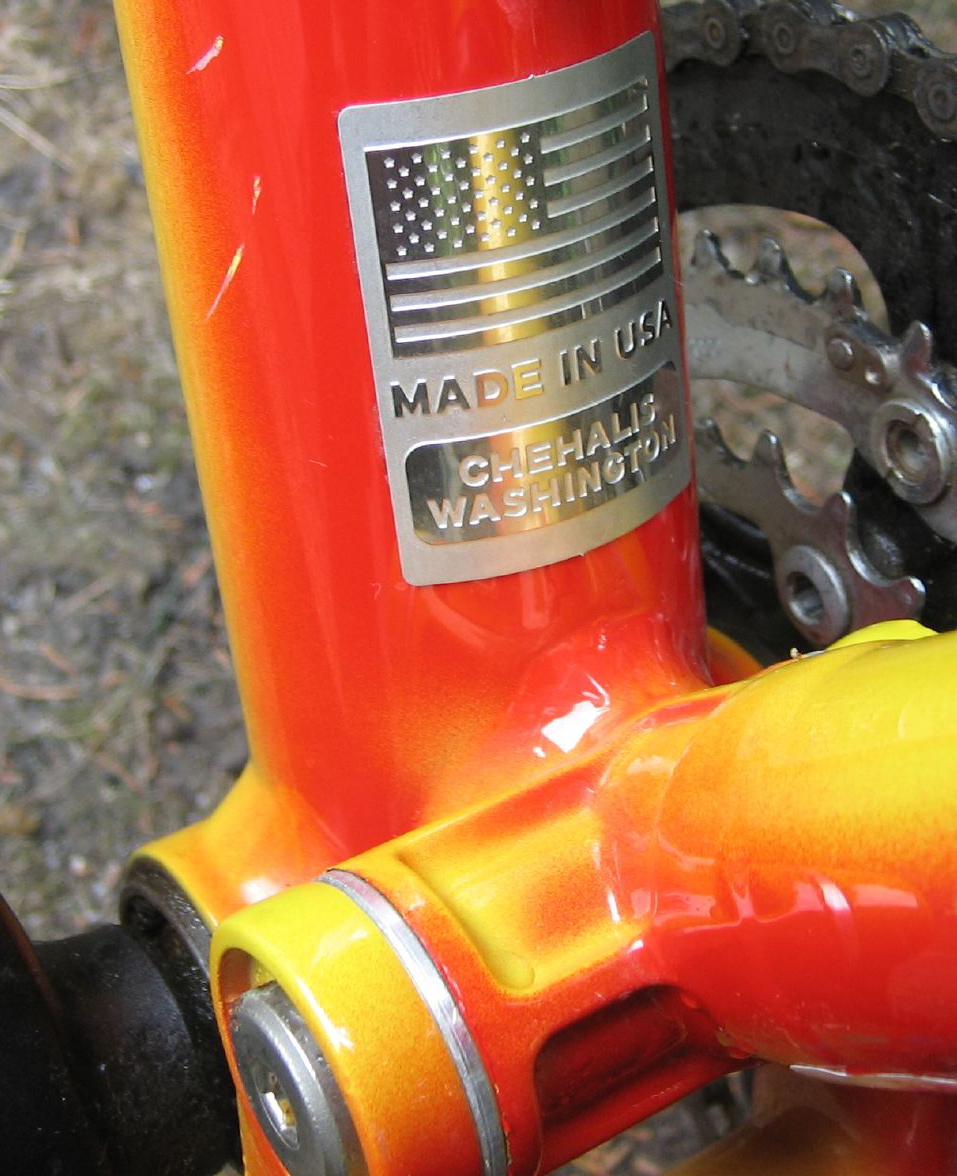
The bottom bracket and suspension pivot of a Klein Adept Comp

Some off-road models featured two designs of one-piece welded stem-bar combination, marketed as "Mission Control" (MC), that eliminated clamping bolts and excess material. The original version, MC1, used a quill stem and required a 1 inch (25 mm) threaded steerer. MC2 used a locknut tightening against a collet that sat between the fork steerer and the stem, and a special eight pointed wrench was required to remove it. The steerer had to be cut to the correct length in order to adjust the height of the stem. MC3 was a third version that was only the stem, thus the handlebar was not welded.

Klein held a patent (US 5433465) for an improved method of routing cables through the frame of a bicycle, that reduced aerodynamic drag and stress on the frame. (Note: Earlier patents for internal cables, such as US 4585246, also exist, and the Klein patent specifically covers the entry and exit points of the cable.) The front and rear derailleur cables were routed through the down tube, and the rear brake cable through the top tube, although some models changed in 2002 to top tube cable routing for greater harmonisation with Shimano components.

In the 2002 model year, Klein replaced 6061 aluminium alloy with a new alloy called ZR 9000, that used zirconium in place of chromium; the new alloy had not been assigned an industry number and it was named after the unused 9000 series. Advertised improvements included a 190 grams (6.7 oz) decrease in weight per frame and a fatigue life five times longer than the 2001 model year frames.

While Klein's use of aluminium for a bicycle frames was not entirely novel, his use of large diameter tubes was. (Note: Aluminum had been used previously in Monarch bicycles produced in the 1940s and by ALAN of Italy.) Aluminium alloys have a Young's modulus around a third that of steel, but with larger diameter, thinner-walled tubes he was able to make a bicycle that weighed around 15% less than a conventional model.

== Techniques ==
Klein bicycles were famous for their paintwork, and offered a large number of custom colours and patterns. The paint used was a Durethane enamel non-metallic paint that cost up to US$1,800 per gallon. The Klein logo was debossed into the frame by painting the frame in the colour of the logo, then applying a mask and painting the pattern.

Beginning with the MC2 frames, Klein used "Gradient tubing", where the wall thickness varied along the length and diameter of the tube. Highly manipulated chainstays on mountain bikes allowed a tighter rear triangle to accommodate large off-road tyres, and facilitated efficient transfer of power.

Welded aluminium needed heat treating to restore strength lost in welding. After the treatment, frames were required to be aligned to within 0.004 inches (0.10 mm) on all alignment surfaces, and were then machined to within 0.0002 inches (0.0051 mm).

== Models ==
Klein produced both mountain bikes and road bikes.

Models are sourced from the official catalogue for that particular year. Years marked in red are incomplete due to a lack of reliable source information.

Model	'84	'85	'86	'87	'88	'89	'90	'91	'92	'93	'94	'95	'96	'97	'98	'99	'00	'01	'02	'03	'04	'05	'06	'07	'08
Adept (Note: The earlier Adept models were hardtails; in the 1992 catalog it is described as "multi-use." The ones produced in 2001 and 2002 were full suspension mountain bikes.)																									
Adroit																									
Advantage																									
Aeolus																									
Agile (Note: The Agile was a modified Adept, with a drop bar for cyclocross use. Only a very small number (two or three) were ever made for Klein team racers.)																									
Attitude																									
Aura																									
Criterium																									
Fervor																									
Karma (Note: The earlier Karma produced in 1998 was a full suspension mountain bike, whereas the later ones were commuter bicycles.)																									
Kirsten																									
Mantra																									
Mountain Klein																									
Navigator																									
Palomino																									
Panache																									
Performance																									
Pinnacle																									
Pulse																									
Q-Carbon (Note: Distinct from the Q-Pro Carbon)																									
Q-Elite																									
Q-Pro																									
Quantum																									
Rascal																									
Reve																									
Stage																									
Team																									
Top Gun (Note: The Top Gun was renamed the Rascal after Paramount Pictures objected to the name, shared by the 1986 film Top Gun.)																									
References																									

== Sponsored teams ==
Klein made custom bikes for San Francisco's Lombardi team, which were ridden in 2001. German cycling team Gerolsteiner rode Klein Quantum frames before 2003, when Gerolsteiner changed their bike sponsor to Wilier Triestina. For the 2004 season, Klein sponsored the Jittery Joe's cycling team.

== Media ==
A green Klein Pinnacle bike was hanging in the set of Seinfeld from season 3 episode 5 through the end of the series.
