= Cowlitz Trail =

Native American trail in Washington state

- Ancient Trading Path
- Type: Indigenous trading path
- Etymology: Cowlitz people
- Location: Washington state

History
- Formed: Unknown
- Original use: Native American trade; settler migration

Site notes
- Current use: No official usage; remnants and historical markers

The Cowlitz Trail was a Native American footpath located primarily in Western Washington in Washington state. The trail is mostly non-existent in the present day, but monuments mark its original path.

The trail has two main branches centered at a bend of the Cowlitz River near Toledo, Washington. The east-to-west route that reaches White Pass has several branched paths connecting to a larger trail system. In the present day, U.S. Route 12 approximately follows this portion of the Cowlitz Trail. The north-to-south route was considered the most preferred means of travel for settlers to Puget Sound and has been mostly lost due to being overlaid by early byways in the 1920s and Interstate 5. There is no official designation of the beginnings nor ends of the trail.

The Cowlitz Trail was most likely blazed by the Cowlitz people and other Indigenous peoples following game trails and expanding the pathway as their primary means of travel for seasonal needs and trade. By the early 19th century, fur trading companies and non-Native settlers focused on farming and economic opportunities began to use the trail and expanded it. Journeys over the muddy and difficult terrain vexed travelers. The path became of use to move livestock to markets and troops between forts, and over the coming decades, enlarged for wagons, stagecoaches, and eventually automobile travel.

== History ==
=== Native American use ===
Indigenous people of the territory more than likely formed early trails in Western Washington out of existing animal trails. The trail fostered trade with other tribes within the region. The trails between the Columbia River and Puget Sound coalesced into one system centralized around the Cowlitz River, giving rise to the Cowlitz Trail.

Native Americans in the Pacific Northwest who used the Cowlitz Trail set up camps recognized today under protected federal areas, such as La Wis Wis and Ohanapecosh. Grazing and temporary camps were located on the south side of the trail near the Lewis River.

=== Non-Native settlement ===
The first known non-Indigenous people to explore the Cowlitz River were members of the Astor Fur Company in 1811. In the 1820s, the Hudson's Bay Company opened a trading post at Fort Vancouver, leading to expansive trade on the Cowlitz Trail system in the territory. The trail was built up by early fur traders, with additional trading posts built and burgeoning farm settlements following. Still in use as a footpath, travelers began to use horses on the trail and used the route to move livestock. Bateaus, up to 32 feet (9.8 m) in length, were begun to be used in traversing the Cowlitz River portion. The Klickitat people, known by the English moniker "roving Klickitat", began using the trail in earnest after the arrival of white settlers in order to prosper through increased trade.

By the 1840s, settlers began using the Cowlitz Trail, migrating to the lands in search of freedom and economic opportunity. Though other routes existed to reach Puget Sound, the north-to-south section was the most preferred route, widened so that it could be used for wagons. Migrating settlers began to consider the Cowlitz Trail an extension of the Oregon Trail. Pioneer homesteaders, including Michael Simmons and George Bush, used the trail in 1845 to begin the early community of Tumwater. Early non-indigenous explorers included Ezra Meeker during his 1852 expedition, and James Longmire and William Packwood who traveled the route in 1854.

Due to an increase in settlement and economic activity, the trail was expanded in the early 1850s as a road to link Fort Vancouver with Fort Steilacoom. The new path was given the name, Military Road, paid for with a mix of federal funds and a "road tax" (Note: The "road tax", due to a lack of physical money, was often paid in exchange for labor in constructing Military Road.) on settlers. The new road followed the west bank of the Cowlitz River, directed east at Toledo, then known as Cowlitz Landing. Built on a higher elevation, the road followed the northern sections of the trail, becoming a route to carry troops while supplying a more efficient connection for mail deliveries, stagecoaches, and travelers.

Cowlitz Landing expanded becoming an important stopping point on the trail, as was the homestead of the John R. Jackson family, the location of the first recognized courthouse in the Washington Territory. As demands for travel continued to increase, early forms of stagecoaches were introduced. Northern Pacific Railroad constructed a rail line in the early 1870s between Kalama and Tacoma; the railroad company surveyed the east-to-west portion of the trail as a potential railway in the late 1870s. The coaches branched off to surrounding communities, further connecting the region to the trail. The Military Road was eventually became a corduroy road after the introduction of automobiles to the territory.

=== 20th century to present day ===
A new road, known as Pacific Highway was created in the early 1920s, roughly paralleling and overlaying the Cowlitz Trail; the highway became known as U.S. Route 99. The old pathway was further lost in the 1950s with the construction of Interstate 5 (I-5).

Little of the original Cowlitz Trail remains in the present-day. Numerous monuments denoting the Cowlitz Trail are located throughout the modern road's expanse that overlays several stretches of the original footpath of the area's Indigenous people. Attempts have been made to include the Cowlitz Trail under a historic designation of the National Trails System.

== Geography and course ==
In areas of higher elevation, the original trail was usually traversed over hills, ridges, and mountain terrain, often near less dense forest, as Native American tribes in the region avoided the lowlands. The path dropped into river valleys only if the landscape was too steep. The Cowlitz Trail meandered through several prairies which contained blue camas, a wildflower that was a culinary staple of the indigenous people in the region.

The Cowlitz River becomes part of the trail near Toledo, at a large bend in the waterway. Indigenous travelers used cedar canoes specifically designed to withstand damages caused by gravel in the lower sections of the river and its rapids. Travelers would then restart on foot northward, walking through the Chehalis Valley and into the lower Puget Sound region, sometimes continuing by other means or trails as far north as the San Juan Islands and Vancouver Island, or towards the Pacific Coast. A notable landmark on the passageway was Mima Mounds. The trail crossed through areas known to settlers as Newaukum, Skookumchuck, (Note: Skookumchuck is spelled as Skukum Chuck and Newaukum as Nahwahkum in early descriptions of the trail.) Wet Prairie, and Rainier. The northern section of the trail is generally considered to match the path of I-5.

As settlers and industry began to use the Cowlitz Trail, the path was becoming associated as a road, described as being difficult to traverse, with concerns over excessive mud and water, rough terrain, and stretches of dense forest that created a variety of obstacles for travel. At times, the trail was not wide enough for a wagon. Conditions near Saundersville, or present-day Chehalis, was especially noted during winter, with deep mud and waters. Travelers were described as needing to "swim their horses through the swales".

There is no official designation to the beginning or ending terminuses of the Cowlitz Trail however Sylvester Park, once known as Capital Park, in Olympia is a considered endpoint. Remnants of the trail are still visible in the Upper Cowlitz river region in the 21st century.

=== Branches ===
Forming a larger trail system, numerous tributary trails that interconnected Indigenous pathways through the Pacific Northwest branched off from the main Cowlitz Trail. The east-to-west portion of the trail connected the Cowlitz people with the Yakama through Cowlitz Pass. The eastern path followed the Cowlitz River from the present-day locations of Mossyrock and Packwood to a fork near La Wis Wis Campground. A northern branch went towards Naches Pass. Another trail meandered to Clear Fork and Summit Creek and on to Carlton Pass (Soda Springs) and Cowlitz Pass. A third and fourth branch led to White Pass and Teiton Pass, respectfully.

The main branch of the Cowlitz Trail that headed east-to-west is considered to roughly match that of present-day U.S. Route 12.

Additional connections to the overall trail system was a smaller branch into Klickitat country. After expansive trade with settlers, the fork became unkempt for travel and eventually became of use solely as a hunting path. Washington State Route 14 is considered to roughly follow the Klickitat portion of the interconnected trail system.

== Landmarks ==
Waypoints of the Cowlitz Trail include an apple tree located near the Fort Vancouver trading post. The specimen was considered the oldest tree of its type in the state until it died in 2020; cuttings of the tree have been planted around the region. A black walnut thought to have been located at the sight of the Monticello Convention was relocated near Longview and survives as of 2024.

A dedication marker, honoring the "Ancient Trading Path", was installed at Tumwater Historical Park near Tumwater Falls in October 2002. The monument, paid for by the Daughters of the American Colonists, was one of 50 such markers dedicated throughout the United States.

As of 2024, the pioneer log cabin of Simon Plamondon remains in existence near Castle Rock as does the 1850s Jackson Courthouse in Mary's Corner. Additional sites of importance include both the Joseph Borst House and Fort Borst Blockhouse in Centralia. Offspring survive from an original butternut tree that died in 2021, planted by Tumwater homesteaders, George and Isabella Bush.

=== Davis-Meeker Oak ===
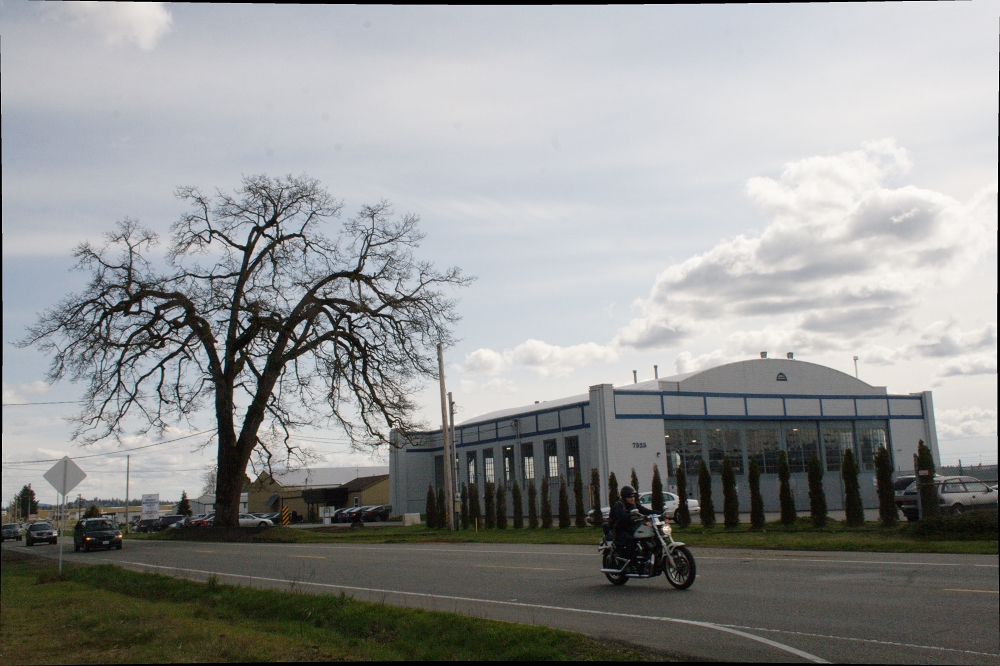
Davis-Meeker Oak, 2011

The Davis-Meeker Oak, considered an important site to the Coast Salish people, is a natural marker on the Cowlitz and Oregon trails. The tree is a 400-year-old historic Garry oak located at the Olympia Regional Airport on Old Highway 99. The landmark was officially named in 1996 after Ezra Meeker and Jack Davis, an environmentalist who helped save the oak in 1984 during a highway improvement project; the added cost to the highway project was $20,000. The oak is listed on the Tumwater Register of Historic Places.

In 2001, the tree was measured to be as tall as 100 feet (30.5 m) with a 16 foot (4.9 m) circumference. The oak is considered a reminder of the indigenous practice of prairie burning to support the growth of edible vegetation, such as camas lily. The burns prevented fir trees from being established, allowing Garry oaks to flourish in the area.

In 2024, safety for passing motorists became a concern when a 10 foot (3.0 metres) branch broke and fell several feet near the roadway. Tumwater's mayor attempted to remove the tree in May of that year without the support of the city council based on a 2023 report of the city's arborist that concluded the tree was high risk; the report was criticized for having numerous flaws. Due to public protests, coupled with a citizen lawsuit and report discrepancies, the mayor paused her efforts and agreed to obtain a second opinion. Options to save the tree were announced by the city in February 2025 and the city council adopted a plan to preserve the tree in April. A Thurston County judge ruled in December 2025 that the city “may not alter or destroy" the historic tree without the permission of the Tumwater Historic Preservation Commission; the ruling is considered permanent.

A windstorm in September 2025 caused the loss of approximately 30% of the tree's canopy. Due to earlier efforts to declare the tree an historic site, work to prune or provide maintenance to offset damages to the Davis-Meeker Oak required permission and permits from the state and the Washington State Department of Archaeology and Historic Preservation.
