= Lewis Clark =

Lewis Clark may refer to:

- Lewis Clark (Canadian politician) (1923–2003), member of the Legislative Assembly of Alberta
- Lewis Gaylord Clark (1808–1873), American magazine editor and publisher
- Lewis W. Clark (1828–1900), American judge

== See also ==
- Lewis Clarke (disambiguation)
- Lewis and Clark (disambiguation)
- Lewis-Clark Valley
- Lewis Clarkson
- Louis Clark (disambiguation)
- Louis Clarke (disambiguation)
- Lois Clark
