= Lewis and Clark Township, St. Louis County, Missouri =

Township in Missouri, U.S.

Coordinates: 38°48′29″N 90°20′40″W

Lewis and Clark Township is a township in northwestern St. Louis County, Missouri. The population is over 32,000.

The major municipality in Lewis and Clark Township is Hazelwood.

== Representation ==
- U.S. House District 1
- State Senate District 7
- State House District 78
