= Lewis and Clark Trail State Park =

State park in Washington, U.S.

- Location within Washington (state) Location within the United States
- Location: Columbia County, Washington, United States
- Coordinates: 46°17′18″N 118°04′19″W
- Area: 36 acres (15 ha)
- Elevation: 1,371 ft (418 m)
- Administrator: Washington State Parks and Recreation Commission
- Website: Official website

Lewis and Clark Trail State Park is a 36-acre (15 ha) Washington state park located on the Touchet River in Columbia County with both old-growth forest and 1,333 feet (406 m) of river shoreline. The park offers camping, hiking, fishing, swimming, birdwatching, interpretive activities, wildlife viewing, and athletic fields.
