= Mary's Corner, Washington =

Unincorporated community in Washington, United States

- Unincorporated community
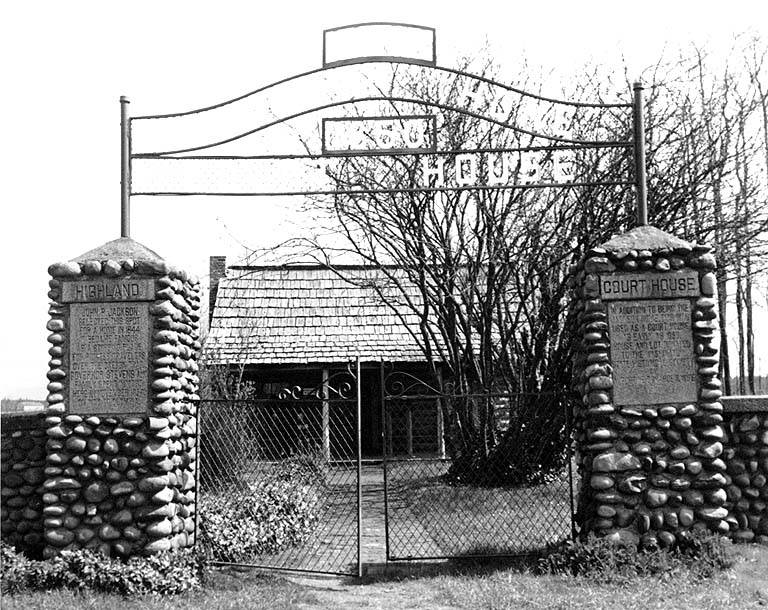
- Jackson Courthouse near Mary's Corner, Washington

- Location within Washington (state) Location within the United States
- Coordinates: 46°32′48″N 122°49′21″W
- Country: United States
- State: Washington
- County: Lewis
- Elevation: 538 ft (164 m)
- Time zone: UTC-8 (Pacific (PST))
  - Summer (DST): UTC-7 (PDT)
- ZIP Code: 98532
- Area code(s): 360, 564
- GNIS feature ID: 1511127

Mary's Corner is an unincorporated community located in Lewis County, Washington. The area sits at the crossroads of U.S. Route 12 and Jackson Highway (once the Pacific and National Parks Highway intersection). The community is 11 miles (18 km) south of Chehalis and 4 miles (6.4 km) west of the town of Ethel.

== History ==
The area's first non-Native settler, John R. Jackson, set up the first county seat in his log cabin in 1851. The cabin became the first federal court in the newly formed Washington Territory in 1854. The area and town, referred to at the time as the Highland Prairie or Highlands, would remain the county seat until it was moved to Claquato in 1858.

The name of the community is taken from Mary Loftis (née Rogers, also spelled Loftus), an owner of a restaurant located in the area that began operations in the late 1880s. (Note: Newspaper reports in the area first started using the term "Mary's Corner" in 1927.) The Loftus family would own two bears, "Susie", a brown cinnamon, and a black bear named "Hard Boiled Dick". The pair were considered as a tourist attraction in the town. In 1927, Susie escaped from her leash and attacked a teenager, resulting in physical injuries and a lawsuit; the pet ursus was put down.

As part of the White Pass Scenic Byway, a wayfaring sign for the route was installed in Mary's Corner in 2011. The stone and wood gate weighs 10-tons and was part of a federal grant and tourism initiative.

== Arts and culture ==
=== Historic buildings and sites ===
The historic Jackson Prairie School, located in the north section of the community near the Matilda Jackson Heritage Site, was built in the 19th century as a one-room log cabin schoolhouse. The building was rebuilt in 1906 and an addition of a second room constructed in 1913. The school would be moved across the highway in 1920 and a bell tower would be added in 1961. Part of the defunct Jackson Prairie School District, the school reached a high of 48 students in 1960. After the community merged with the Winlock school district in the early 1960s, the schoolhouse was sold to a family and the building has been used as a private residence since the 1970s. Homeowners in the 2010s began a renovation that strengthened the original gymnasium and displayed the 400-pound (180 kg) school bell that was repurchased in the 1990s after it was sold in 1965.

== Parks and recreation ==
The 616-acre (249 ha) Lewis and Clark State Park is directly south of the community. The John R. Jackson House, listed on the National Register of Historic Places and protected as a state park, is located in the town. Mary's Corner is also home to the Matilda N. Jackson State Park Heritage Site, a 5.0-acre (2.0 ha) day-use park.

The community's Jackson Prairie Church is the starting and end point of several routes for the Lewis County Historic Bike Ride, an annual fundraising event begun in the early 1990s. The western terminus of the White Pass Scenic Byway is near Mary's Corner.

=== Chehalis Golf & Country Club ===
A nine-hole golf course was built in 1922 across from the Matilda Jackson park and next to the Jackson Prairie Schoolhouse. It was designed by golf architect A. V. Macan and was officially opened in July 1923 as the Chehalis Golf & Country Club. The course and clubhouse was built on farmland on a budget of $35,000. The club would host a new type of competition, a "shortstop tourney", and held several amateur tournaments in its early days. By the late 1930s, the club saw a noticeable decrease in activity and the last official club event was held in 1942. The clubhouse was used for a brief time by a local social club but the golf course never reopened.

=== Jackson Prairie Speedway ===
The community was once home to the Jackson Prairie Speedway, a 0.2 mi (0.32 km) oval racetrack. The family-owned track, built in 1992 and officially opened for public use in 2002, had a tradition to never sell alcohol during events. The stands could approximately accommodate 900 spectators at the high-bank track, originally built of clay but paved over in 2006. The hall of fame hydroplane racer, Chip Hanauer, once raced on the track in 2007. Citing increased operating costs and subsequent decreases in events and attendance, the Guenther family closed the speedway in autumn 2007.

== Economy ==
In the formative beginnings of the Klein Bicycle Corporation, the company began building bicycles out of a barn in Mary's Corner starting in 1981. The company opened a 14,000 square feet (1,300 m^{2}) factory plant in the town that was increased to 70,000 square feet (6,500 m^{2}). Klein was sold to Trek Bicycle in 1995 and the manufacturing site closed in 2002 as the new ownership transferred its holdings to Waterloo, Wisconsin, Trex's home base. The grounds were eventually used in the 2000s by a conveyor belt manufacturer.

== Education ==
Mary's Corner was once part of the defunct Jackson Prairie School District. A farmer born in Mary's Corner, Henry Lucas, who served 57 years on the school board until 1962, was recognized as the longest officiating school board member in Washington state history. Due to a combination of state laws and failed tax initiatives in the early 1960s, the school merged with the districts of Winlock, and eventually Napavine.

== Infrastructure ==
The community is home to the Jackson Prairie Underground Natural Gas Storage Facility, the 14th largest underground gas-storage reservoir in the United States. A minor leak occurred in 1965 but no injuries or damage occurred.

== Media ==
Mary's Corner is a location used in the Patricia Harrington mystery novel, Death Stalks the Khmer. Known as "St. Mary's Corner" outside of Chehalis, the book involves an unsolved murder within a Cambodian refugee community in the Puget Sound region.

== Notable people ==
- Gary Klein, pioneering inventor and manufacturer of aluminum bicycles
