= Lewis and Clark State Recreation Site =

State park in the U.S. state of Oregon

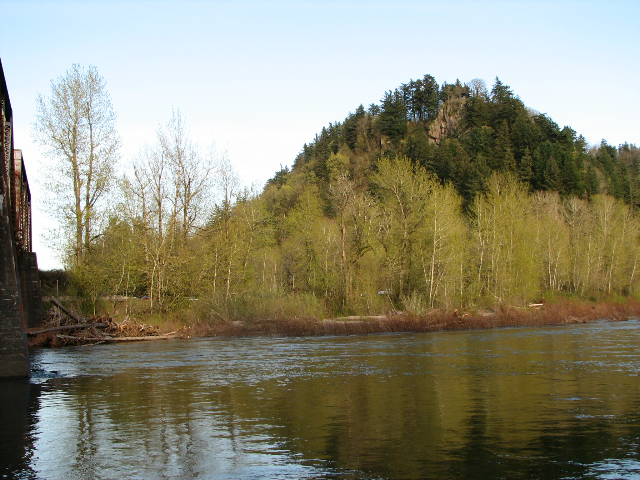
- View across the Sandy River toward the recreation site and Broughton's Bluff

- Location within Oregon Location within the United States
- Type: Public, state
- Location: Multnomah County, Oregon
- Nearest city: Troutdale
- Coordinates: 45°32′27″N 122°22′37″W
- Operator: Oregon Parks and Recreation Department

Lewis and Clark State Recreation Site is a state park in eastern Multnomah County, Oregon, near Troutdale and Corbett, and is administered by the Oregon Parks and Recreation Department. It is located on the Sandy River, near its confluence with the Columbia River. Broughton's Bluff marks the westernmost extent of the Columbia River Gorge at the site.

The site is open for day use only. It offers a developed picnic area and pet exercise area, as well as picnicking and swimming along the Sandy River. A ramp provides boat access to the river, and trails allow rock climbing on Broughton's Bluff.

The Lewis and Clark Expedition explored the area along both rivers. The site includes interpretive markers about the expedition and other historic themes.

Lewis and Clark State Recreation Site lies within the Columbia River Gorge National Scenic Area.

== See also ==
- List of Oregon state parks
