= Layser Cave =

Cave in Gifford Pinchot National Forest

- Rock shelter
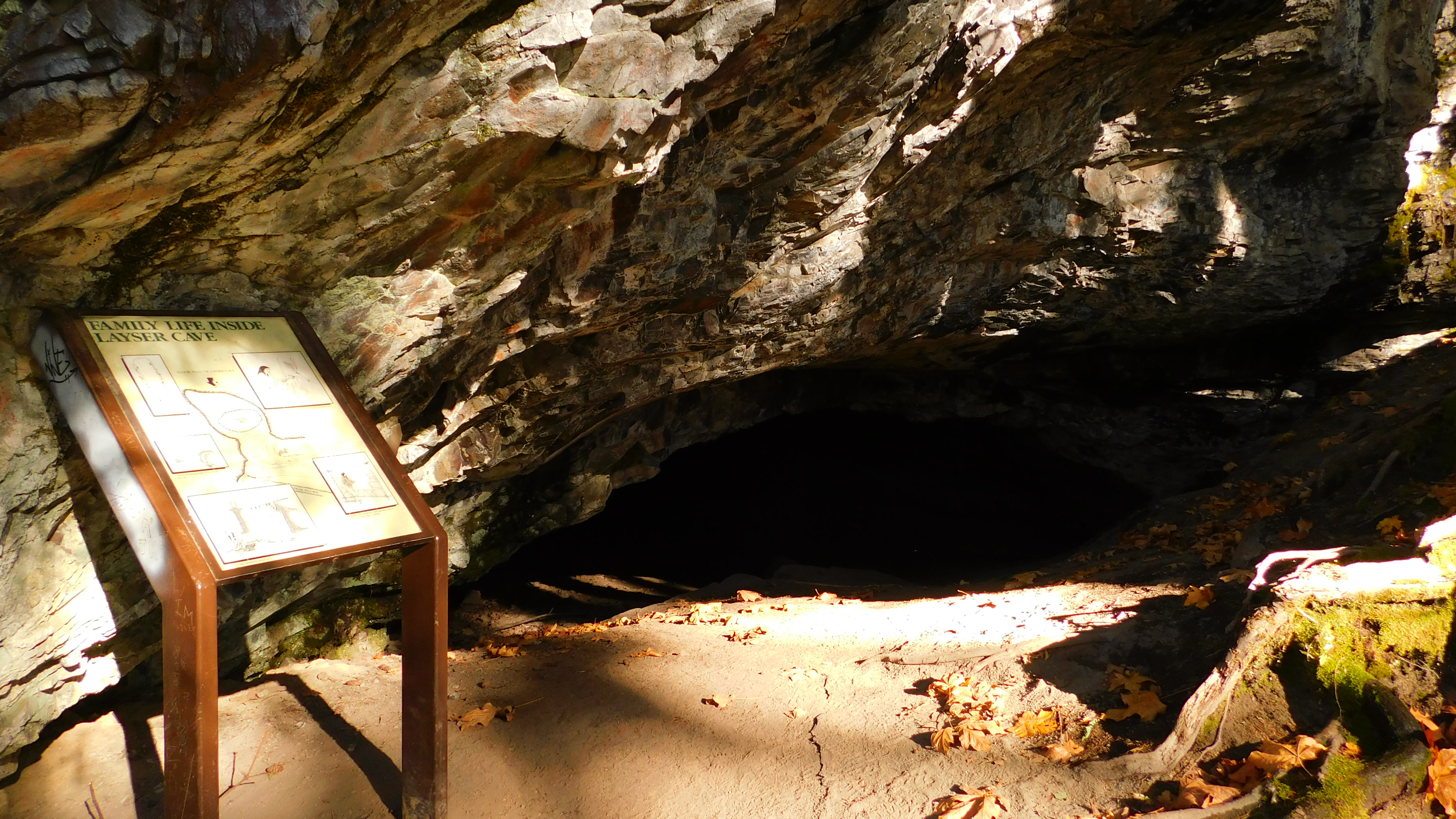
- Layser Cave, Washington state, 2023

- Coordinates: 46°27′38″N 121°51′39″W
- Location: south of Randle, Washington
- Part of: Gifford Pinchot National Forest
- Offshore water bodies: Cispus River
- Age: Unknown
- Formed by: Suspected lava tube
- Orogeny: Miocene uplift
- Geology: Basalt, tephra
- Etymology: Tim Layser, rediscovered in 1982
- Operator: United States Forest Service

Dimensions
  - Width: 20 feet (6.1 m)
  - Depth: 32 feet (9.8 m)
  - Height: 2 metres (6.6 ft) approx.
- Elevation: 2,400 metres (7,900 ft) approx.
- Website: U.S. Forest Service - Layser Cave

Layser Cave, also known as the Layser Cave Archaeological Interpretative Area, is a natural rock shelter located in Gifford Pinchot National Forest within Lewis County, Washington, approximately south of Randle, Washington. The shallow cave is open to the public via a short, steep trail and is under the oversight of the United States Forest Service (USFS).

The cave was a seasonal domestic and hunting site for indigenous people in the area, including the Upper Cowlitz and possibly the Yakama. Archaeological evidence has shown the landform to have been used for the processing of deer, elk, and salmon as early as 7,000 years ago but was abruptly abandoned approximately 3,500 years later. The abandonment was most likely due to a loss of animal and vegetation sustenance for native people due to severe volcanic eruptions and subsequent ash fallout from Mt. St. Helens during the period. With a lack of historical documentation or stories, the cave is thought to have been forgotten.

Layser Cave is named after Tim Layser, a USFS employee who rediscovered the landform accidentally in 1982. Looting and vandalism in the years after the announced finding led to a severe loss of historical artifacts. Archaeological studies began in earnest due to the losses, finding tools made of various materials, and evidence of hunting and preparation of foods. Further examinations found evidence of regional trade, as arrowheads, beads, and flora at the site were not endemic to the site or region.

The cave is formed in basalt with calcium carbonate veining, while the floor contains multiple layers of tephra.

== History ==
Layser Cave was originally part of the indigenous homelands of the Cowlitz people, specifically the Upper Cowlitz, also known as the Taitnapam; the site may have been in use up to 7,000 years ago. The Yakama people have also been theorized to have used the landform. The cave was rediscovered by college student, Tim Layser, in 1982. Working for the United States Forest Service (USFS) as a cultural resource technician, Layser happened upon the cave by accident while marking trees for thinning. He originally investigated the rock shelter using a cigarette lighter. A USFS archaeologist, Rob McClure, toured the cave the next day, recording up to 50 artifacts. After the rediscovery announcement, the cave was left open to the public, forcing the first archeological studies to begin in 1986 and 1987, due in part to ongoing looting and vandalism at the site.

Continuing archeological studies in the 20th century into the next millennium provided evidence of tool building and hunting at Layser Cave, which was used as a long-serving communal shelter and work site for thousands of years by the Cowlitz tribe and their ancestors. Evidence suggests that the cave went unused between 2,000 and 4,000 years ago, possibly abandoned abruptly at one point 3,400 to 3,500 years ago, coinciding with volcanic activity at Mt. St. Helens. (Note: The timeframe of occupancy and the abandonment date of Layser Cave fluctuates depending on the source. Most records are in agreement that the cave was occupied as early as 7,000 years ago and most likely abandoned at around 3,500 years ago. See sources throughout the article.) A common theory suggests the abandonment was due to excessive ashfall and a subsequent, long-term loss of vegetation and wildlife. With a lack of sustenance, indigenous people no longer had a need for the site and the cave was forgotten.

Though the cave is considered to have gone unused since that time, the cave was possibly used by the Cowlitz again by the 18th century, though permanently abandoned after the tribe fled the area during a rise in what was called the "grey fever", a deadly illness theorized to be either influenza or malaria. No written record, nor historical telling, of why the cave was abandoned has been found.

=== Archaeological finds ===
The cave was not a permanent camp but was found to be occupied mostly during spring and summer hunting seasons and used primarily for processing deer and elk for meat and hides. Due to the nature of domestic-type tools discovered, it is theorized that occupants of the site were often nomadic family units, usually between 12 and 15 members, rarely exceeding 20 people.

Evidence of processing salmon has been found and remains of mountain sheep have also been discovered. Studies found both charred and dried fruit seeds, indicating food was gathered and prepared for later use, a theory that set back the timeline for such indigenous ways of life. Killing grounds for deer were located over a ridge from Layser Cave in a box canyon.

The cave and its artifacts were well-preserved due to the reaction of naturally occurring calcium carbonate within the rock, helping to create a protective, alkaline soil at the site. As of 2000, between 10,000 and 15,000 artifacts have been found and documented. The finds include scrapers for preparing animal skins, as well as tools to make perforations in the hides. Shapers and sewing tools were also discovered, leading to a theory that clothing was manufactured at the site. Tools of various uses were made of a variety of materials, including bone, stone, wood, and even sinew. Fire hearths were discovered in the cave.

A common find were arrowheads, broken spearpoints, and bladed rocks, considered to be a form of a knife. Some arrowheads were made of obsidian from Central Oregon and spear tips were crafted from andesite, basalt, or calcedony. Marine shells from the Oregon Coast were also discovered. The latter finds showed a potential trade link within the region before the arrival of non-native explorers and settlers.

Additionally, remnants of huckleberry were identified, the oldest such finds of the plant in the Pacific Northwest. The huckleberry species has been determined to not be endemic to the forest but most likely from the coastal region, another signifier of regional trade. By 1993, over 15,000 bone fragments of various animal and fish species were found; a tally of 108 deer were noted to have been butchered in the cave.

Most of the historical artifacts that rested above the soil layer are now lost as the cave was heavily looted and vandalized immediately after the rediscovery, including three major incidents in 1985. The cave ceiling has been defaced with graffiti and scratch marks, and the center of the shelter floor was dug out. A brief attempt to fill the landform with aggregate to limit damage was undertaken.

== Geography ==
Layser Cave, also known as the Layser Cave Archaeological Interpretative Area, sits above the Cispus Valley at an elevation between 2,400 feet (730 m) and 2,600 feet (790 m). The cave is located within Gifford Pinchot National Forest, approximately south of Randle, Washington, and as of 2000, one of 1,200 archaeological sites in the forest.

== Geology and environment ==
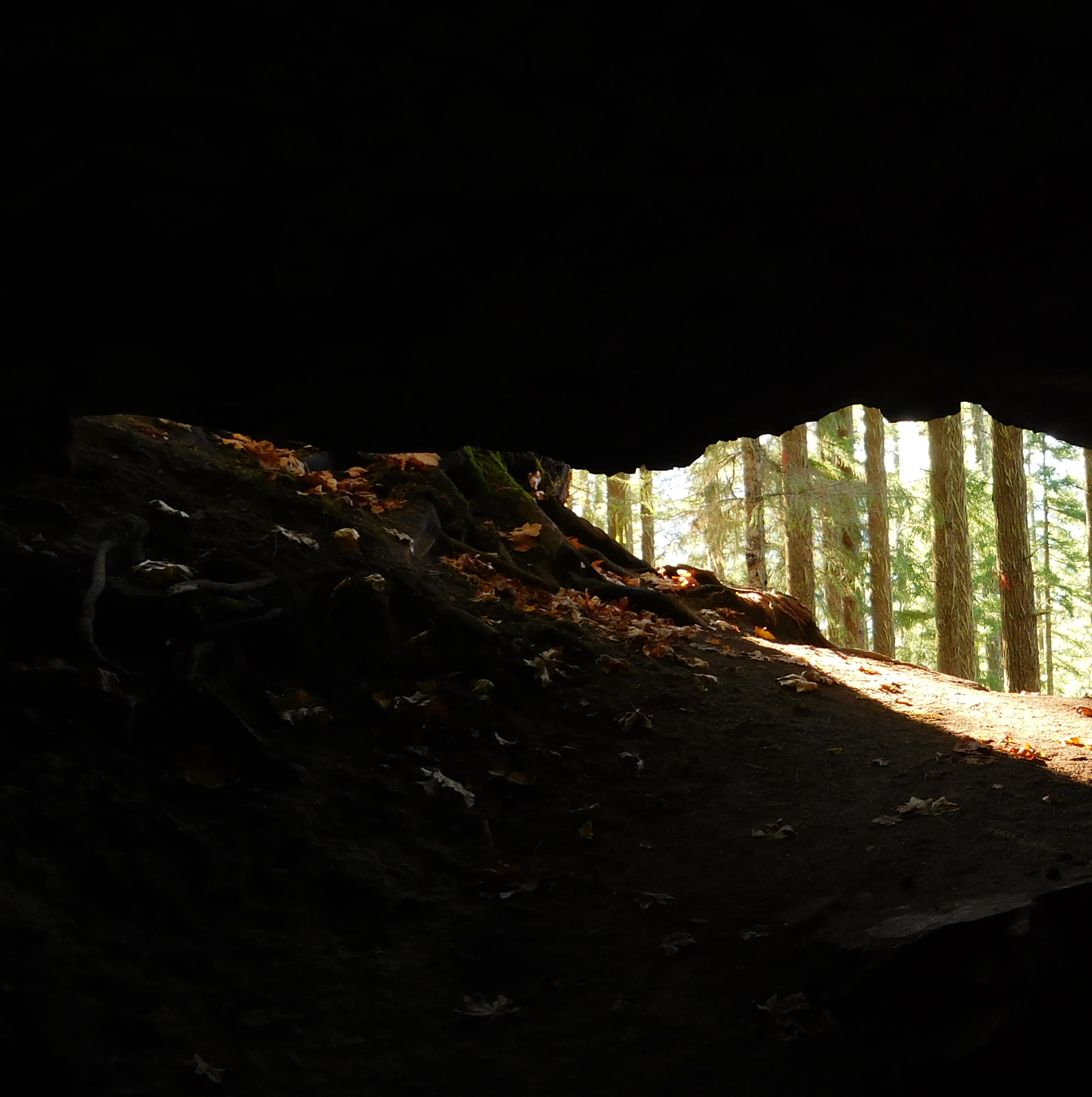
View from within the cave, 2023

The cave is measured at a depth of 32 feet (9.8 m) with a low ceiling and an opening width of 20 feet (6.1 m). The height of the entrance measures approximately 2 metres (6.6 ft) with a maximum height within the rock shelter up to 9 feet (2.7 m). The shallowness of the formation allows for natural sunlight to illuminate the cave.

Oak trees, due to a drier and warmer period during indigenous occupation at Layser Cave, was the more predominant tree species. The site in the present-day is surrounded by semi-old growth Douglas fir that sprouted up after a destructive fire in the Cispus Valley in 1902. The same trees survived a following blaze in 1918. Western red cedar, also known as a "basket tree" due to indigenous people using the bark to construct baskets, are a common species in the area.

Due to the discovery of mountain sheep bones, the region is believed to have contained more grassland during the cave's peak use than in the present day. Mountain sheep are usually not found in heavily forested areas.

Layser Cave is formed within basalt, with the floor consisting of layers of tephra. The ceiling contains calcite veins of various widths. The cave has been suspected to be a fragment of lava tube, but the symptomatic signs of such are absent. It is more likely to be an example of pseudokarst formed by Miocene uplift and folding.

== Recreation ==
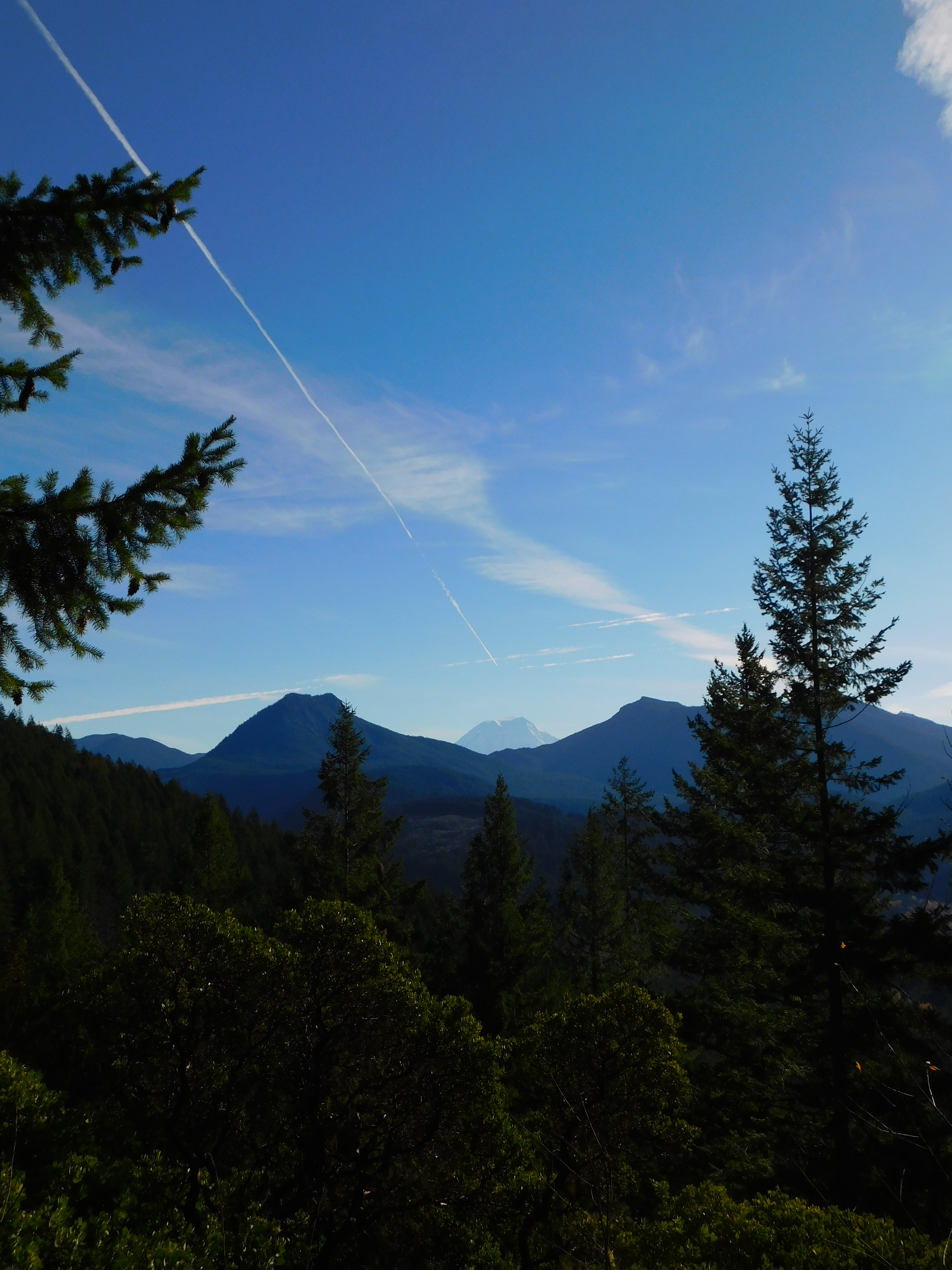
View of Mt. Adams and Cispus Valley, 2023

A trail to Layser Cave is located on a forest service access road south of Randle off Cispus Road. Containing several interpretive panels, the steep trail is measured at 800 feet (243.8 m), or 0.25 miles (0.40 km), and is mostly downhill from the trailhead. The cave is accessible to explore and a looped pathway provides an overlook view of the Cispus Valley. Notable landmarks can be seen from the viewpoint, including Juniper Ridge, Mount Adams, Tongue Mountain, and Tower Rock.

As part of an effort to achieve a rank of Eagle Scout in 1996, Centralia High School student Jesse Miller organized a team of 13 people to construct a 100 foot (30 metres) cedar fence at the valley viewpoint, protecting visitors from the steep drop as well as providing a barrier against the trampling of local, native vegetation.

== See also ==
- List of geographic features in Lewis County, Washington
