= North Fork Guard Station No. 1142 =

NRHP-listed site in Gifford Pinchot National Forest

- U.S. National Register of Historic Places
- Washington State Heritage Register
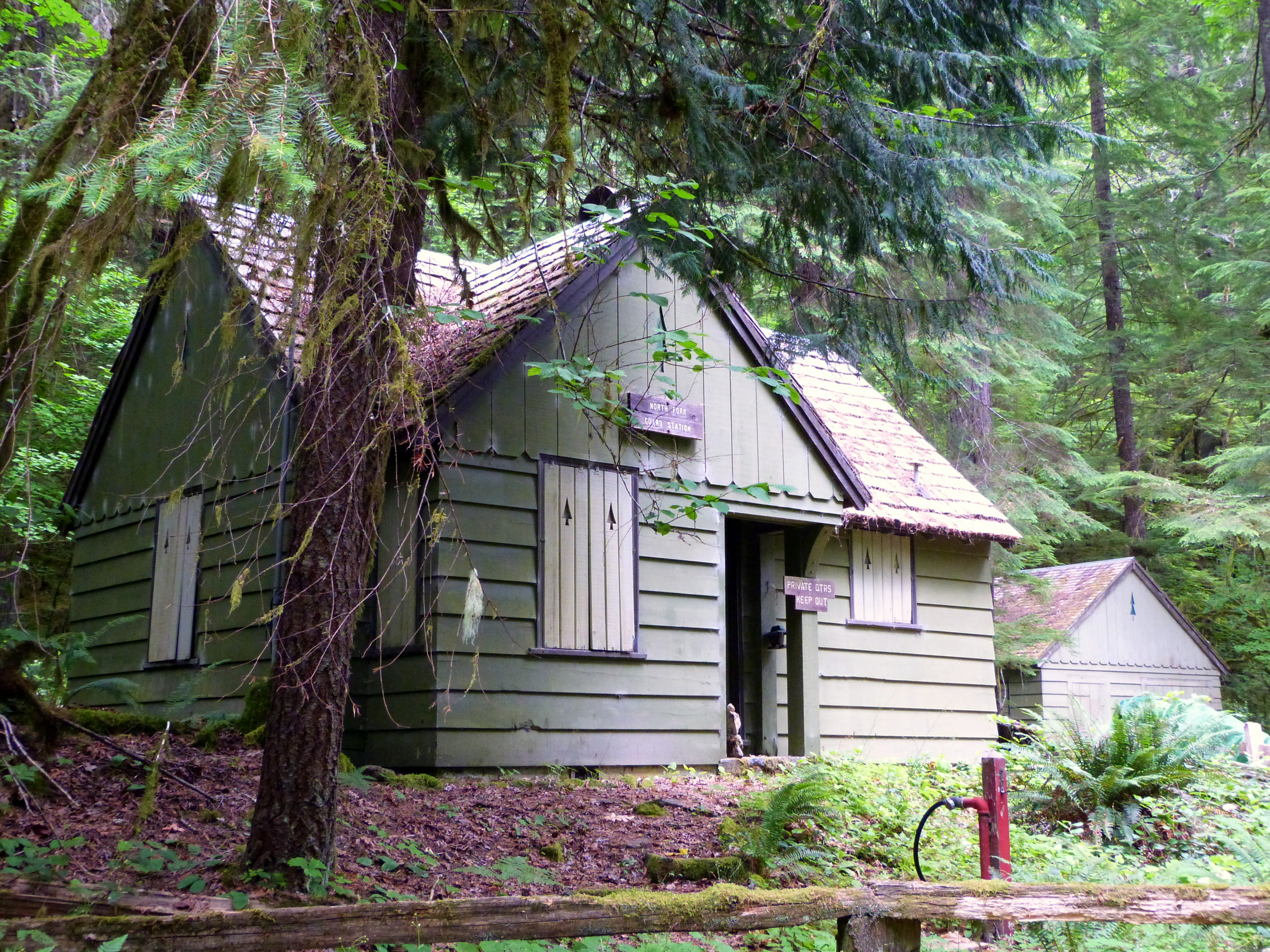
- North Fork Guard Station No. 1142 and garage

- Location within Washington (state)
- Location: near Randle, Washington
- Coordinates: 46°27′13″N 121°47′07″W
- Area: less than one acre
- Built: 1937
- Built by: Civilian Conservation Corps
- Architect: USDA Forest Service Architecture Group
- Architectural style: National Park Service rustic
- Website: USFS - North Fork Campground
- MPS: Depression Era Buildings
- NRHP reference No.: 86000815

Significant dates
- Added to NRHP: April 11, 1986
- Designated WSHR: April 11, 1986

The North Fork Guard Station No. 1142 is a historic United States Forest Service building located in Gifford Pinchot National Forest near Randle, Washington. The station was added to the National Register of Historic Places (NRHP) in 1986.

The historical designation includes the North Fork Guard Station Garage #1551 and the grounds, specifically a stone pathway. The matching, rustic architecture structures are rectangular in nature and are most noted for cutouts of a slender pine tree on the shutters and gables. The station and garage, constructed in 1937 and 1938 respectively, were built by the Civilian Conservation Corps. Per the NRHP nomination, the buildings are considered to be in excellent, unaltered condition.

The site contains a root cellar, built behind the station against a natural rock formation, but it is unknown if the structure is part of the NRHP nomination.

== History ==
The North Fork Guard Station No. 1142 was built in 1937 and its outbuilding, known as the North Fork Guard Station Garage #1551, was constructed in 1938. Both structures were built by the Civilian Conservation Corps (CCC) under the supervision of the United States Forest Service. The CCC economically helped support the regional population during the construction, hiring residents, locally purchasing building materials and camping supplies for the company, and spending their own wages in nearby communities.

== Geography ==
The guard station is located in the "vicinity" of Randle, Washington in Gifford Pinchot National Forest, as part of the Randle Ranger District. The historic site is situated on grounds measuring less than an acre.

Due to its location, as well as deterioration caused by age and changes in the surrounding environment, the North Fork Guard Station No. 1142 was listed in 2022 as one of five NRHP sites in the state at severe risk for river flooding.

== Architecture and features ==
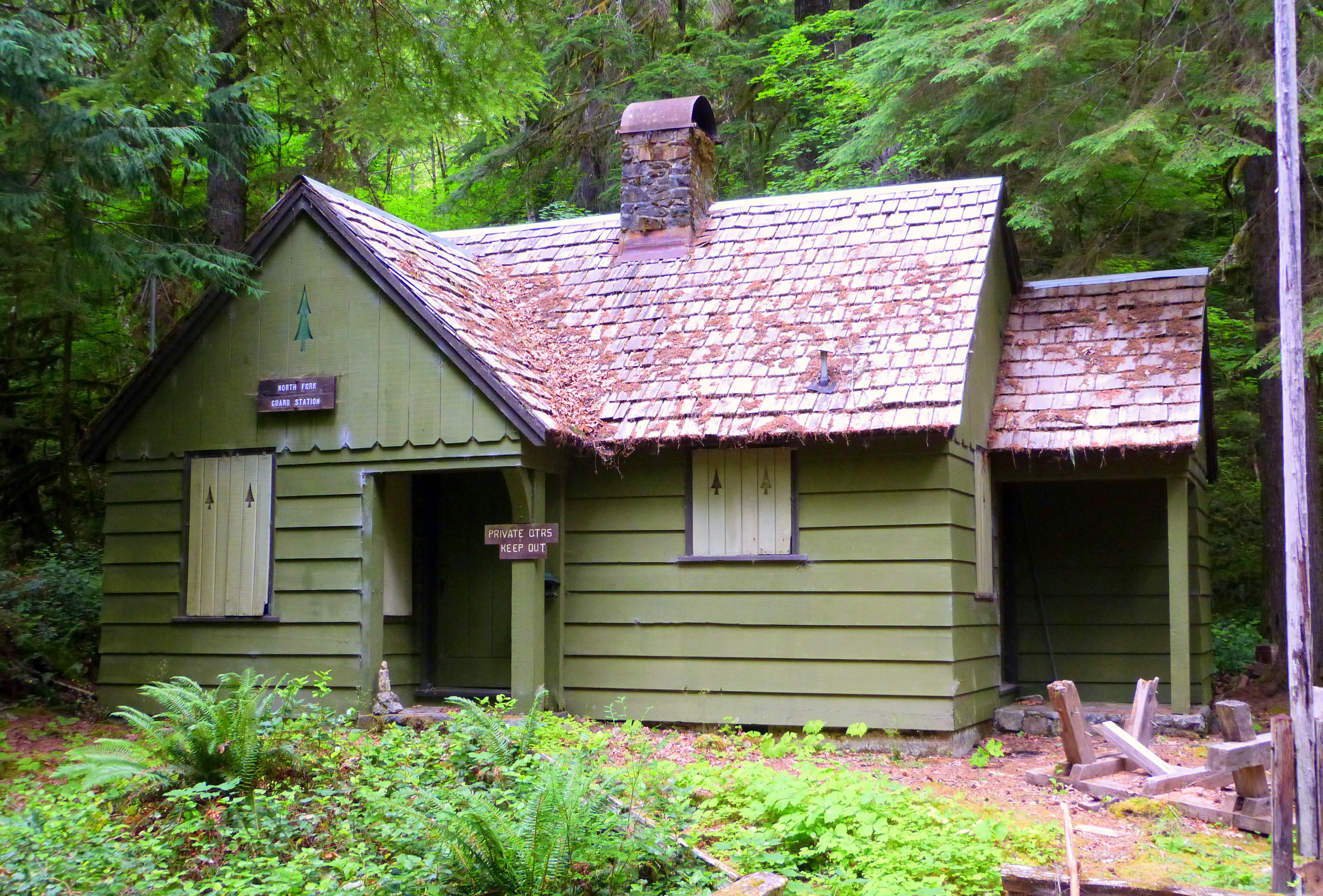
North Fork Guard Station No. 1142

Unless otherwise noted, the details provided are based on the 1986 National Register of Historic Places (NRHP) nomination form and may not reflect updates or changes to North Fork Guard Station No. 1142 in the interim.

The NRHP listing encompasses the North Fork Guard Station No. 1142, the garage, and the surrounding site, which includes the space between the two structures and a stone walkway at the front entrance of the station that continues to the back of the main building. The historic buildings are considered rustic architecture, a style used often by the National Park Service.

A root cellar, built against a geologic rock formation on the hillside, is accessible by a small set of stone stairs at the rear of the station. The "natural refrigerator" provides cool air regardless of the outside temperature. (Note: The root cellar is not mentioned in the NRHP form and its inclusion as covered under the historic designation is unsure.)

=== Guard Station ===
The North Fork Guard Station No. 1142 has a rectangular footprint of 16 ft × 25 ft (4.9 m × 7.6 m) and rests on a poured concrete foundation. The one-story structure features a high-angled gable roof with two gabled, recessed entrances at the front and east side. Both gables are supported by a square timber post. The post of the front entrance, which faces south, features a curved bracket. A rubble chimney rises out from the center of the main roofline.

Horizontal clapboard covers the entirety of the exterior walls, with vertical boards, featuring a notched detail, on each gable. A notable component of the building are the functional, vertical-panel shutters which are accented with a double cutout of a pine tree. Each gable contains a single, matching pine tree cutout.

=== Garage ===
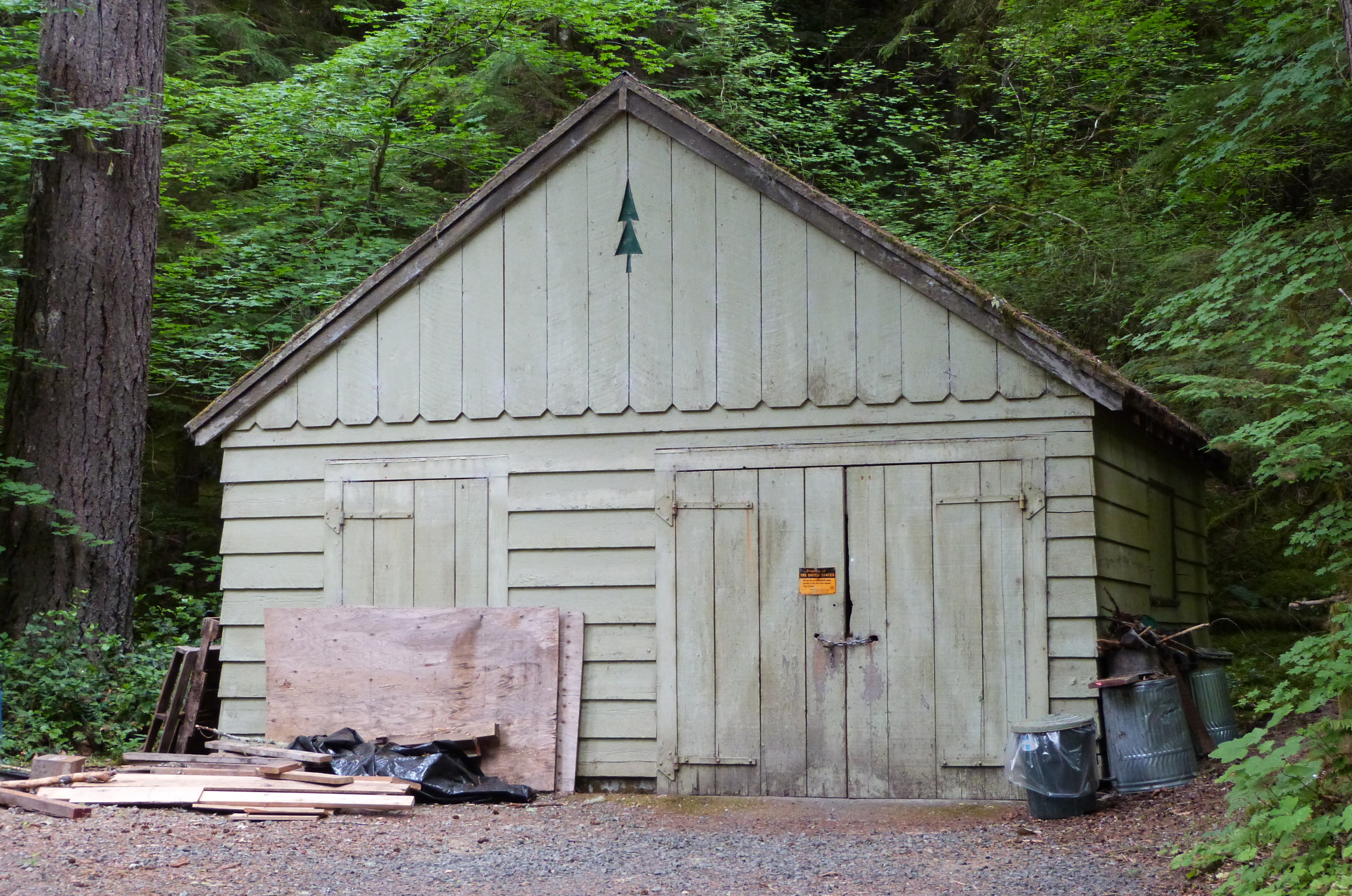
North Fork Guard Station, Garage #1551

The North Fork Guard Station Garage #1551 is similar in appearance to the main building, including clapboard layouts and details, and a pine tree cutout on the front and back gable. The hinged window panels and double-door south entrance to the structure lack the cutout feature. With a slightly rectangular footprint of 16 ft × 18 ft (4.9 m × 5.5 m), the garage also rests on a concrete foundation. The wood shingle roof differs, considered medium-pitched.

At the time of the NRHP nomination, the garage was listed to have six-light sash windows.

== Recreation ==
The grounds are part of neighboring North Fork Campground and a looping, 1.6-mile (2.6 km) hiking path, known as the North Fork Trail #122, crosses the station site. A footbridge on the trail, which spans over the Cispus River, is located immediately nearby. Viewpoints include sightlines to several geologic landmarks in Eastern Lewis County.

== Significance ==
The North Fork Guard Stations No. 1142, which includes the garage and surrounding grounds, was added to the National Register of Historic Places and Washington State Heritage Register on April 11, 1986. The nomination noted the structures lacked any alterations and to be in excellent condition. The station and garage were declared by the NRHP nomination to feature "superior qualities of design and execution".

The connection of the site's build by the Civilian Conservation Corps, and the affect the CCC had on the economy of the local population during construction, was of significant note to the nomination. Additionally, the presence and importance of the United States Forest Service in the region, as well as its role during the time in expanding its oversight from "custodial" management to protecting natural resources, were also important factors in the historical designation. The rustic architecture of the station was declared a prime example of American building styles during the age, as well as being representative of the aesthetics and values of Forest Service structures.
