= Randle Ranger Station-Work Center =

- Randle Ranger Station--Work Center
- U.S. National Register of Historic Places
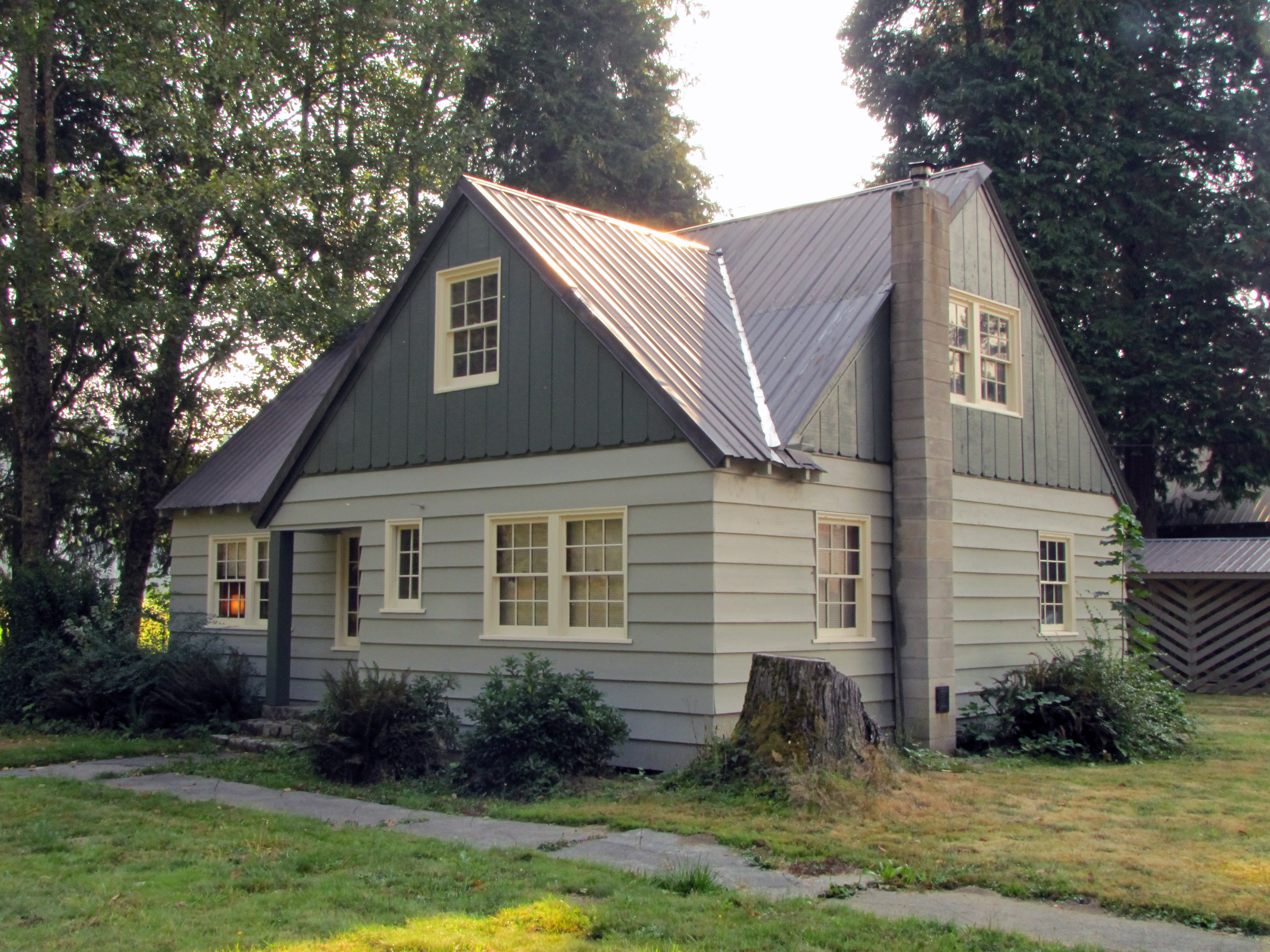
- Randle Ranger Station Office No. 2050

- Location within Washington (state)
- Location: Gifford Pinchot National Forest, Randle, Washington
- Coordinates: 46°32′8″N 121°57′28″W
- Area: 5 acres (2.0 ha)
- Built: 1935
- Architect: USDA Forest Service Architecture Group
- Architectural style: National Park Service rustic
- Website: Cowlitz Valley Ranger District
- MPS: Depression-Era Buildings TR
- NRHP reference No.: 86000816
- Added to NRHP: April 8, 1986

The Randle Ranger Station-Work Center is located within Gifford Pinchot National Forest near Randle, Washington. The center was built during 1935-36 by the Civilian Conservation Corps and was listed on the National Register of Historic Places in 1986 for its architecture.

The buildings were designed by the USDA Forest Service Architecture Group in National Park Service rustic. The listing consists of seven contributing buildings including a barn, fire station, a fueling station, an office, shop building, a vehicle storage building, and a warehouse within a 5-acre (2.0 ha) area.

== History ==
The Randle Work Station buildings were constructed by the Lower Cispus Civilian Conservation Corps (CCC) F-34 camp. The CCC group was first created in April 1933. In early 1936, the laborers completed a fire tool storage warehouse, a storage shed, a residence for a "protective assistant", and increased the size of the barn as well as "renewed" the office building.

The station was consolidated with the Packwood ranger post to create the Cowlitz Valley Ranger Station in 2003; the combined post remains in Randle.

In the continuing activity of Mt. St. Helens after the 1980 eruption, ash fell on the work station grounds in April 1981.

== Geography ==
The Randle Ranger Station--Work Center is located in Randle, Washington and within the borders of Gifford Pinchot National Forest. The site encompasses approximately 5 acres (2.0 ha).

== Architecture and features ==
Unless otherwise noted, the details provided are based on the 1986 National Register of Historic Places (NRHP) nomination form and may not reflect updates or changes to the Randle Ranger Station--Work Center in the interim.

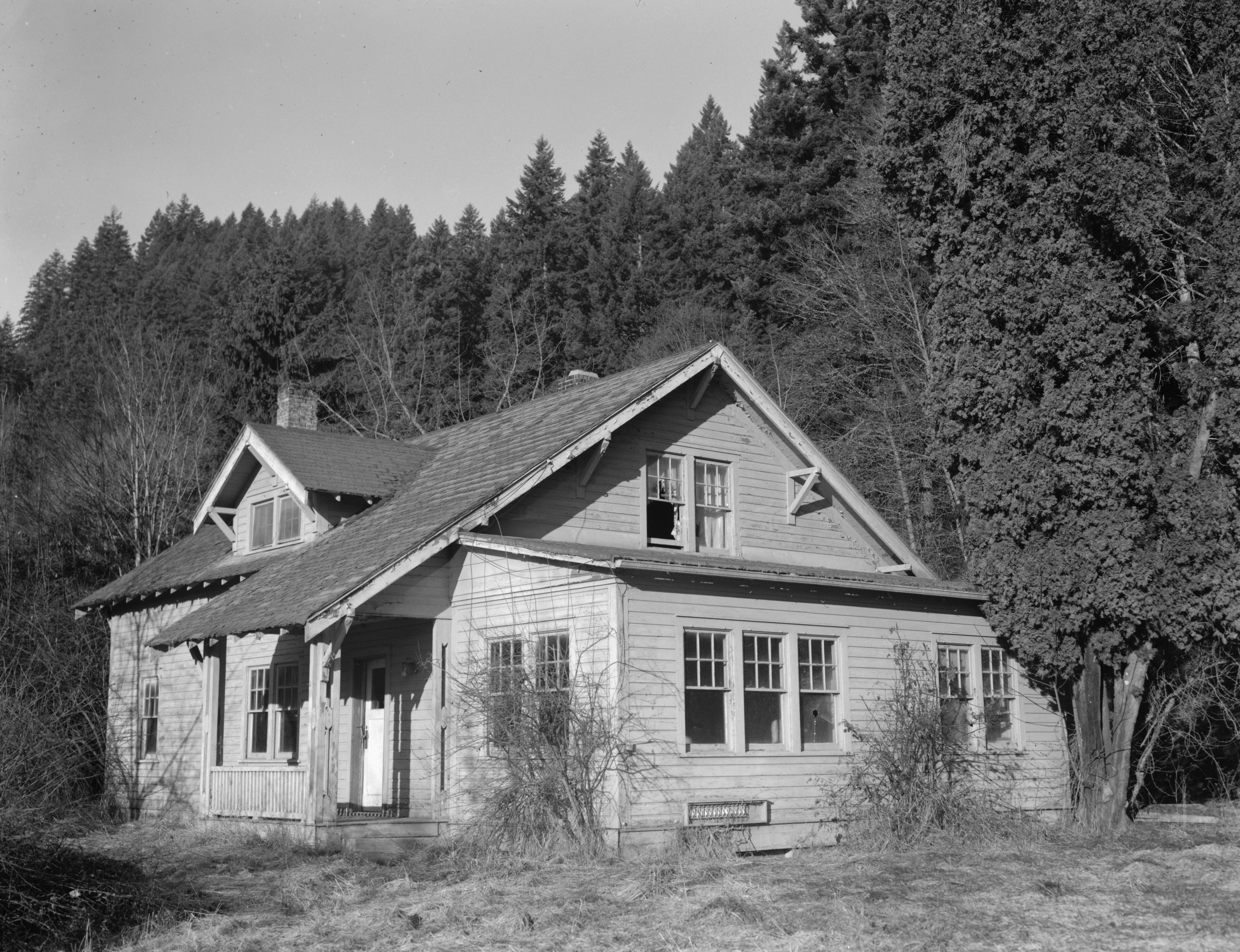
Ranger Residence, Building No. 1135

The nomination includes two main structures, an office and shop building. Additional buildings covered under the historic register are two warehouses, an open vehicle storage shelter, a barn, and a gas and oil storage house. Not all structures, such as employee residences on the grounds, are listed under the NRHP. All buildings covered under the NRHP are listed as being of wood-frame construction and with the exception of the barn, have roofs of textured metal. Several buildings were noted to be altered under the NRHP nomination.

The NRHP nomination includes other features on the grounds, including a flagpole, walkways, and an historic plaque for the Randle Work Center Office #2050.

=== Randle Work Center, Office #2050 ===
Built in 1935, the 1 1/2-story office measures 30 ft × 35 ft (9.1 m × 10.7 m) and is supported by a concrete foundation. The main gabled entry is located on the north side of the façade, offset and recessed under a post-supported 10 ft × 10 ft (3.0 m × 3.0 m) flagstone porch accessed by a three-step stone stairway. The building is unadorned and contains six-over-six windows with mullions. The original flagpole and base resides to the northeast of the office. A bronze plaque on a basalt base is dedicated to a CCC camp member, Robert Fechner.

=== Randle Work Center, Shop Building #2150 ===
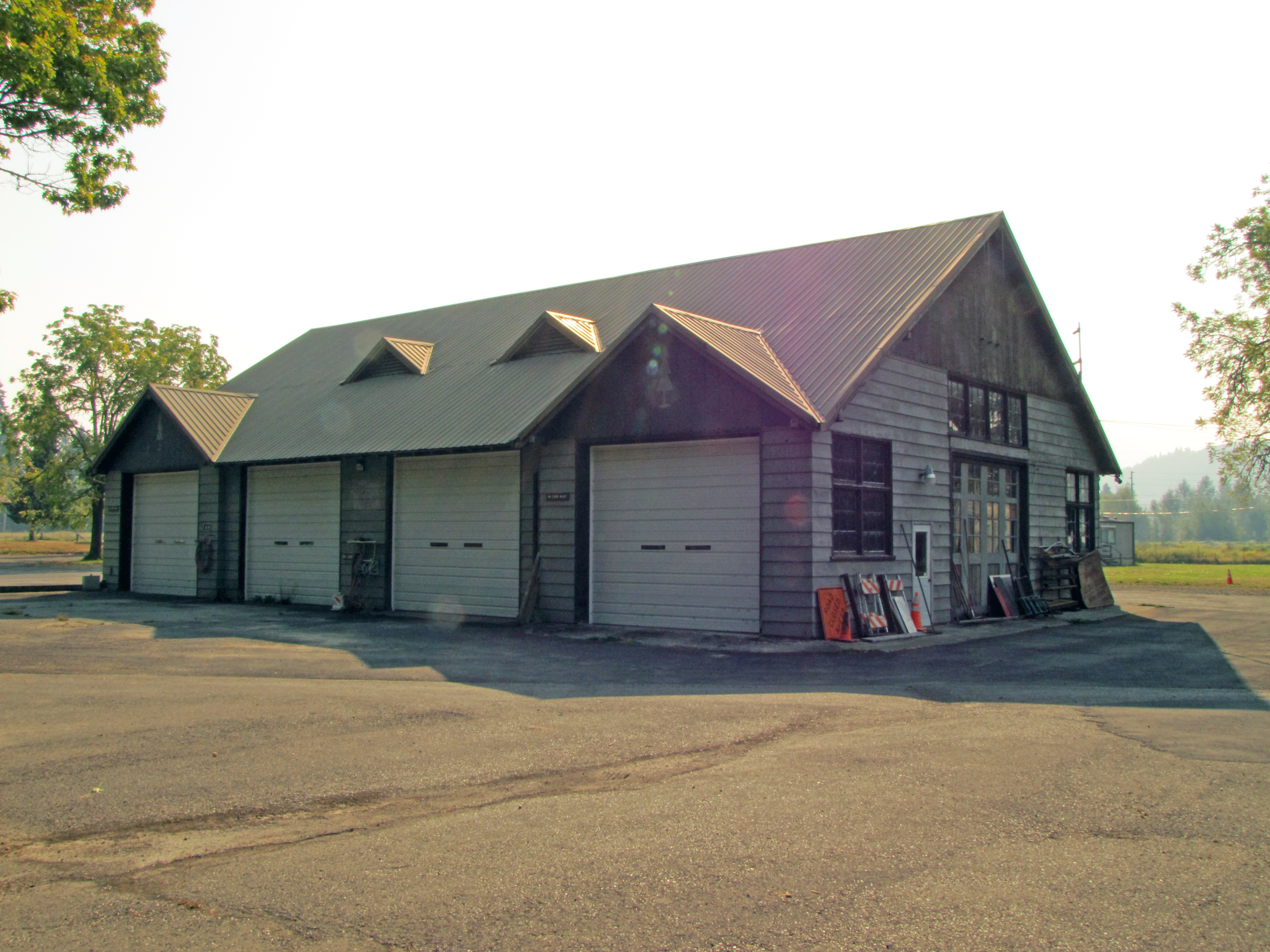
Shop Building #2150

The shop building was constructed in 1936. With dimensions listed at 52 ft × 82 ft (16 m × 25 m), the 1 1/2-story structure rests on a concrete foundation and contains several gable roof features. Two triangular dormers are located on the north and south roofs. Horizontal clapboard sheaths the exterior with vertical clapboard located at all gables and corner notches.

The shop contains seven bays with vertical lift doors for vehicles located on the north side of the building. The doors were considered most likely not to be original to the shop. At the west end is a main center door of four panels, outfitted with ten-light windows on each panel. Mullion windows of various sizes and panes surround all but the north exterior walls. An interior brick chimney protrudes from the south roof. The structure is noted for the design detail of a cutout of a pine tree.

=== Randle Work Center, Warehouse #2251 ===
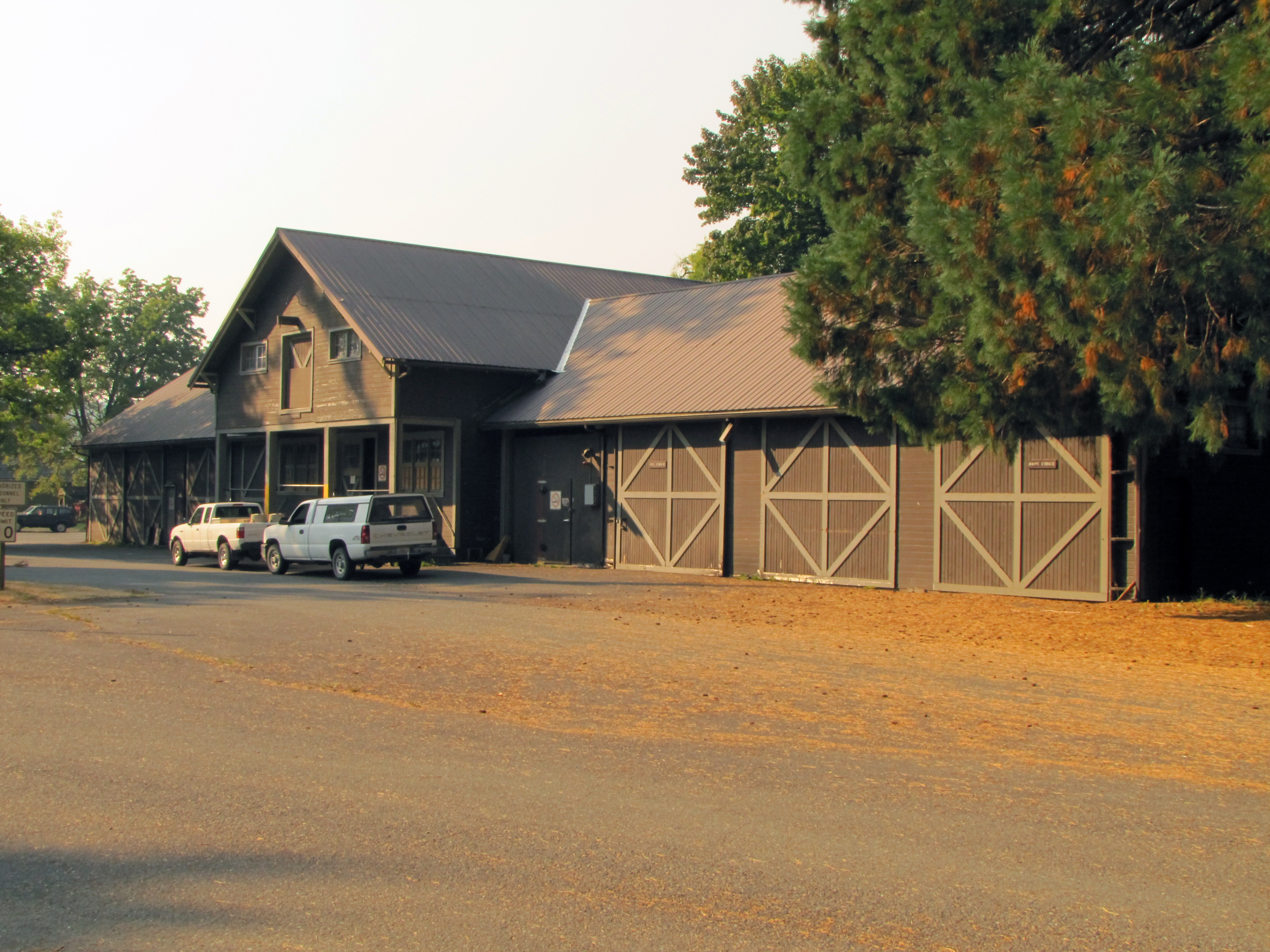
Warehouse #2251

The footprint of the 20 ft × 167 ft (6.1 m × 50.9 m) warehouse is considered to be a cruciform layout. Built in 1935, the structure is 1 1/2-stories and is constructed over a concrete foundation. The gable roof is intersected by a cross-gable that is supported by brackets. The main entrance is located on the east side of the warehouse, recessed under a post-supported 10 ft × 10 ft (3.0 m × 3.0 m) concrete loading dock. A series of eight bays share the same wall. The four outer bay doors are built with vertical boards and diagonal battens; similar style doors exist at other points on the warehouse. One bay was remodeled with plywood and includes an inset, separate door entrance.

The building is considered to be unadorned and contains a 1 1/2-story addition to the west end of the warehouse with a wood-framed cupola along the roof's ridgeline.

=== Randle Work Center, Fire Control Warehouse #2250 ===
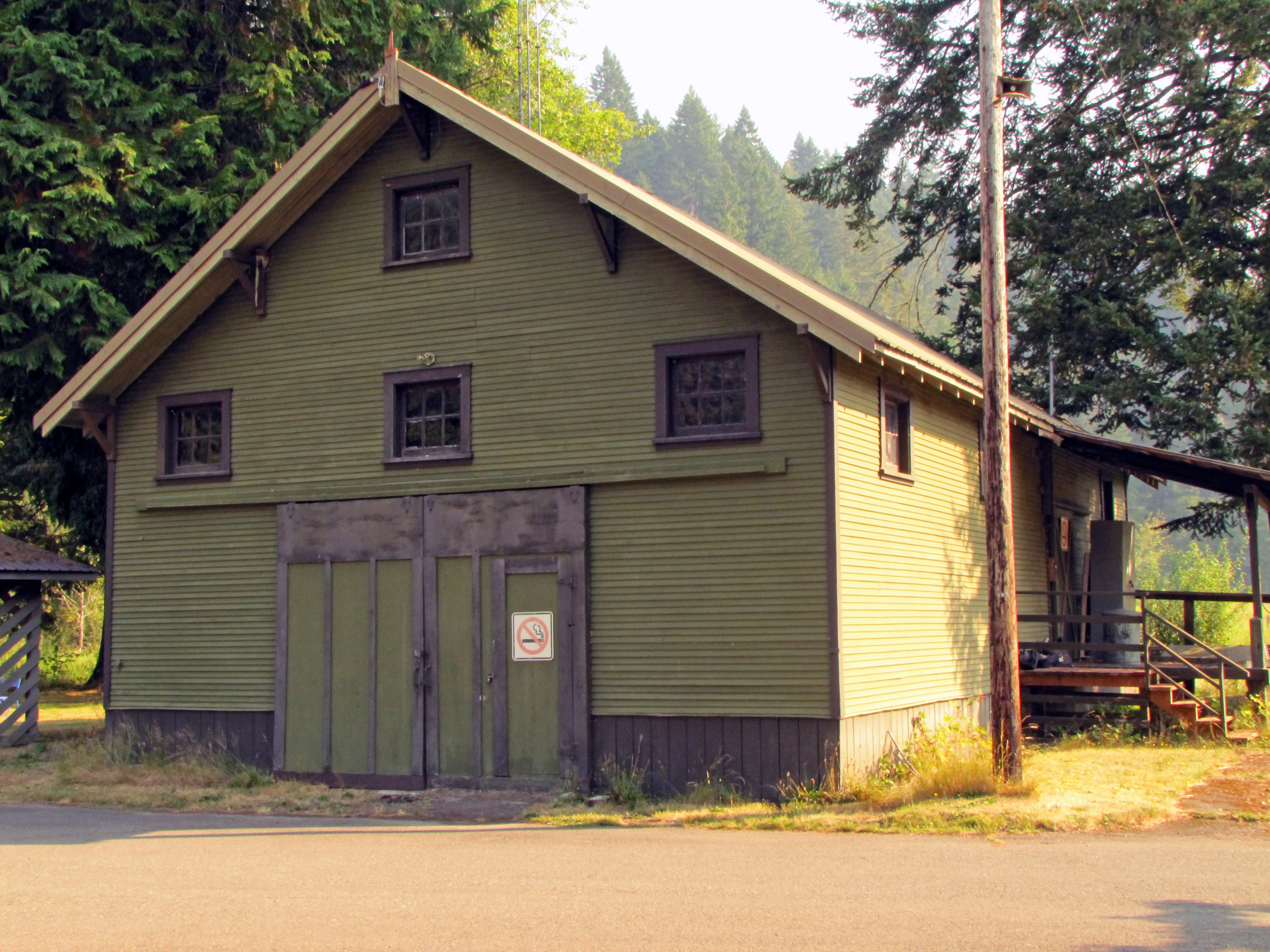
Fire Control Warehouse #2250

The fire control warehouse measures 28 ft × 48 ft (8.5 m × 14.6 m) and was completed in 1935. The 1 1/2-story building was constructed on a concrete pier foundation. Bracketed gable roofs and narrow, horizontal shiplap siding dominate the exterior along with six-light sash windows. The west entrance is covered by a shed roof and the two-leaf sliding doors feature vertical boards with a separate inset into the right doorway. The structure is considered unadorned.

=== Randle Work Center, Open vehicle storage #2850 ===
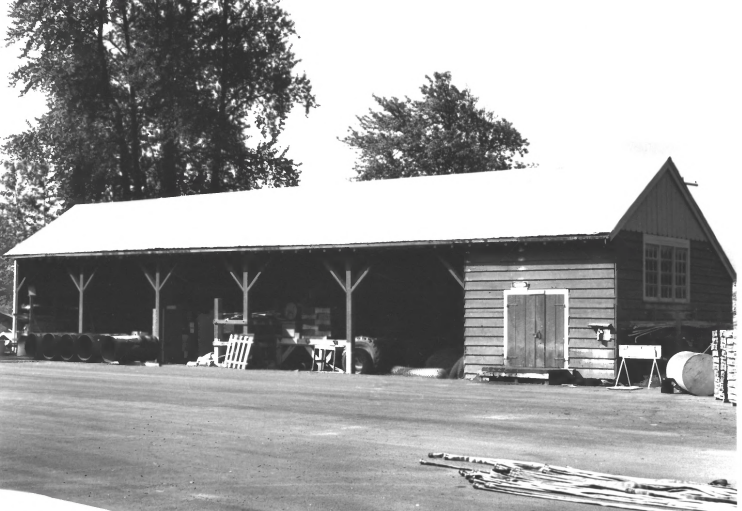
Open vehicle storage #2850

The open vehicle storage building (Note: Unlike other historic buildings at the Randle Ranger Work Center grounds, the NRHP form does not include a numerical designation to the open vehicle storage structure. However, the accompanying photograph file lists the structure as #2850.) was built in 1935 and is listed as 50 ft × 80 ft (15 m × 24 m) in size. Listed as a 1-story building, it rests on a concrete foundation and contains a gable roof. Six bays, separated by bracketed timber posts, dominate the east side of the storage building. The northern most bay is enclosed.

Horizontal shiplap covers the exterior with vertical siding at the gable ends. The structure's north gable end contains a two-leaf door of vertical board in an enclosed bay and large, three panel 12-light mullion windows. The vehicle storage building was noted to be unaltered and unadorned.

=== Randle Work Center, Barn #2450 ===
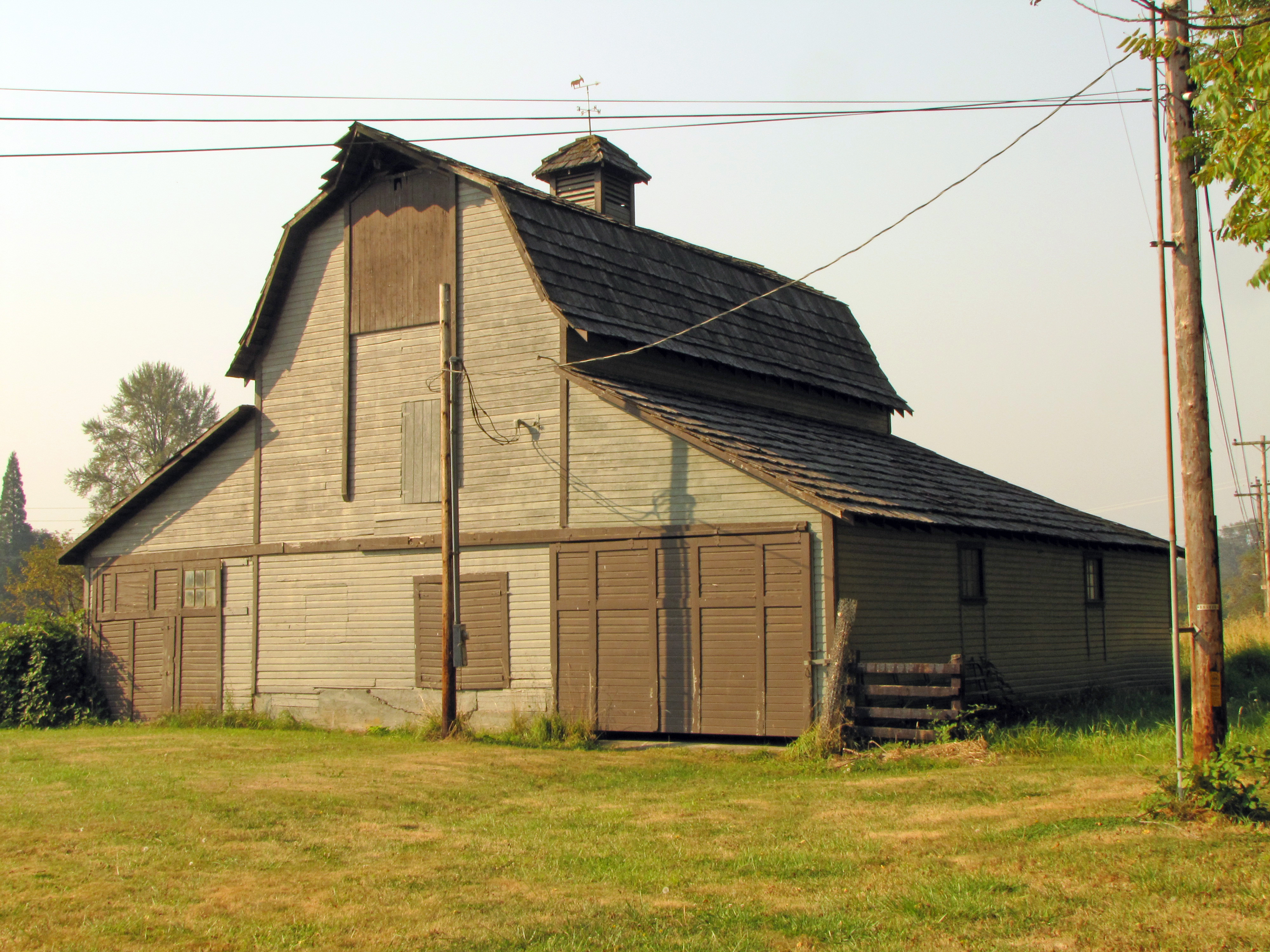
Barn #2450

The dimensions of the work center barn is listed at 50 ft × 52 ft (15 m × 16 m) and the building contains a split shake cedar roof, the only non-metal roof structure covered under the NRHP nomination. The barn is considered of "original design and fabric" without decoration or alteration.

A gable roofline with bellcast eaves also contain hipped roof extensions on all but the east side. A wood-frame cupola is situated on the ridgeline; a brass weather vane of a mule was once attached. Shiplap is horizontal throughout. Slide doors exist on the east and west gable ends and the enclosed northern extension with side dog-trot style entrances. A southern end is open, covered by a gable and contains five stalls and open access to animal stalls.

=== Randle Work Center, Gas and Oil House #2550 ===
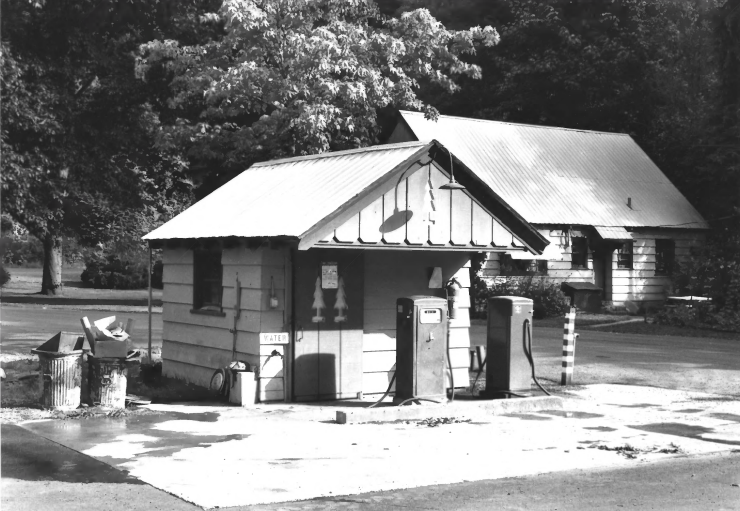
Gas and Oil House #2550

The square, 10 ft × 10 ft (3.0 m × 3.0 m) gas and oil house rests on a concrete foundation and contains a gable roof. Wide horizontal clapboard sheaths the exterior with vertical placement at the gables. The south wall is recessed with an extended gable end that provides cover for the pump system. Windows are six-paned casements and the south entrance is a vertical plank, sliding door with two, large pine tree cutouts. A similar cutout is noted on the gable ends.

=== Grounds ===
Landscaping was begun in 1937 by the CCC under the direction of Jim Langdon and a landscaper architect and gardener, known as Mr. Westridge.

== Significance ==
The National Register of Historic Places (NRHP) noted the construction and connection of the Randle Ranger Station-Work Center to the Civilian Conservation Corps and the town of Randle during the 1930s. Additionally, the presence and importance of the United States Forest Service to the local region was recognized.

The structures of the ranger station were noted for their National Park Service rustic architecture associated with the era, as well as the influence of styles in the construction taken from the Pacific Northwest region. The construction, design, and high standards of the overall grounds and structures were declared by the NRHP as "a good example of an architectural location invested with special aesthetic and associative values by the agency that created it".

The Randle Ranger Station-Work Center was officially listed with the National Register of Historic Places on April 8, 1986.
