= Cowlitz Falls Dam =

Dam in Lewis County, Washington

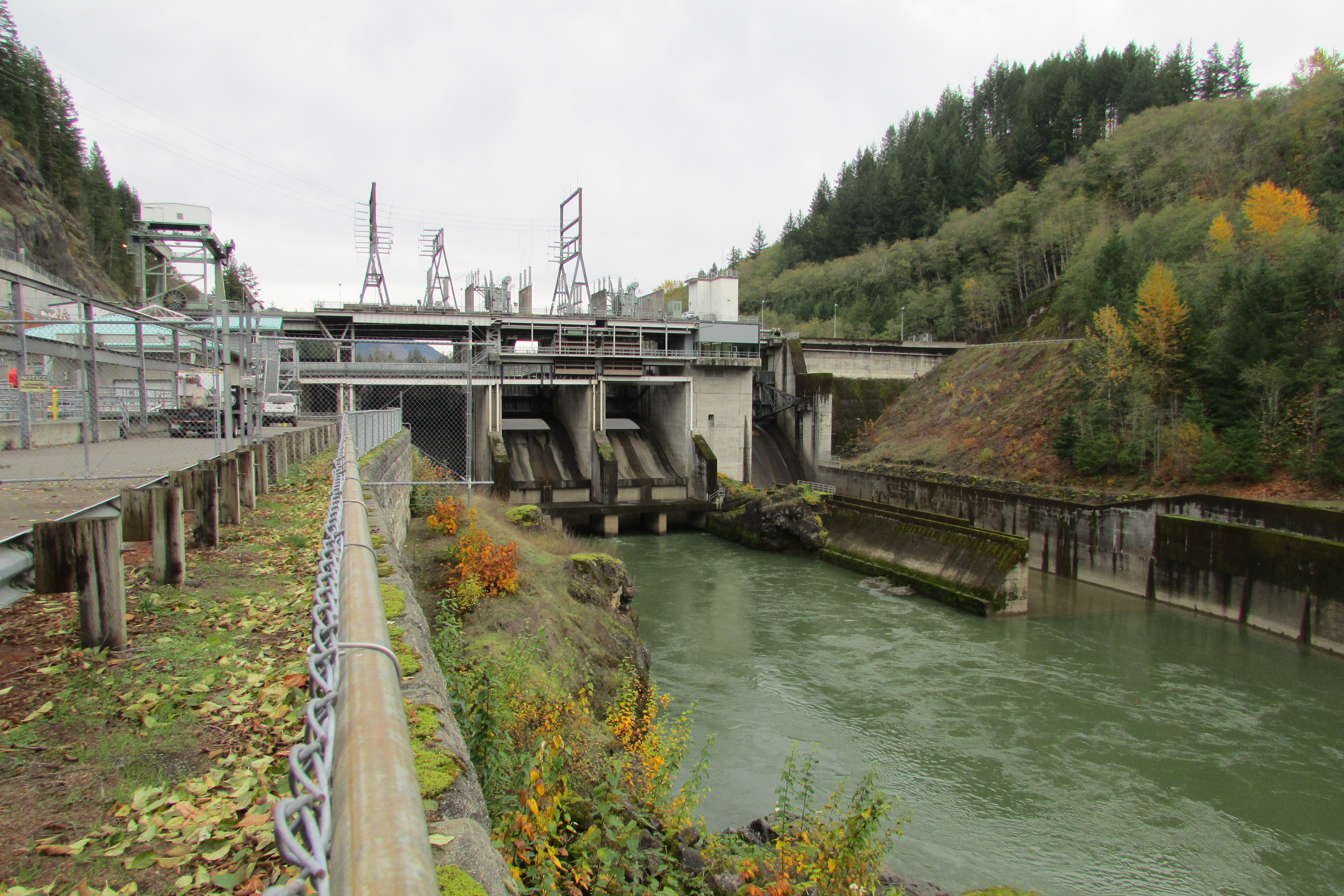
- Cowlitz Falls Hydroelectric Project
- Interactive map of Cowlitz Falls Dam
- Official name: Cowlitz Falls Hydroelectric Project (FERC No. 2833)
- Country: United States
- Location: Lewis County, Washington
- Coordinates: 46°28′00″N 122°06′32″W
- Purpose: Power
- Status: Operational
- Construction began: June 12, 1991
- Opening date: Generator U#1; June 24, 1994; Generator U#2; June 28, 1994; Project Dedicated; August 5, 1994
- Built by: Construction Manager; Bechtel Corporation; Contractor; Torno-America, Inc (Note: Torno-America was the main contractor for dam and powerhouse. 5 other minor contracts were awarded to others.)
- Operator: Lewis County Public Utility District

Dam and spillways
- Type of dam: Gravity dam
- Impounds: Cowlitz River
- Height: 145 ft (44 m)
- Length: 700 ft (210 m)
- Elevation at crest: 885 ft (270 m)
- Spillways: 4

Reservoir
- Creates: Lake Scanewa
- Total capacity: 11,000 ac⋅ft
- Catchment area: 1,030 sq mi (2,700 km^{2})
- Surface area: 700 acres (280 ha)
- Normal elevation: 866 ft (264 m)

Power Station
- Turbines: 2x 35.0 MW
- Installed capacity: 70 MW
- Annual generation: 196.307 GWh

Cowlitz Falls Dam is a 70 megawatt hydroelectric dam in Lewis County, Washington. It was constructed starting in 1991 and completed in 1994. The dam is 145 feet (44 m) high and 700 feet (210 m) long.

== History ==
A village of the Cowlitz people, known as Koapk, existed at the Cowlitz Falls Dam site. The tribe, possibly Upper Cowlitz, were known as the k’wolama.

== Geography ==
The dam's reservoir, Lake Scanewa, is located at the confluence of the Cowlitz River and Cispus River downstream of Randle, Washington with a surface area of about 700 acres (280 ha). The lake is accessible by way of the Cowlitz Falls Park, a day use area situated near the junction with the Cispus River.

== Power plant ==
The Cowlitz Falls Project impounds the Cowlitz River and produces on average 200 gigawatt hours annually for the local public utility, the Lewis County Public Utility District, or about one-third of its annual electrical needs. The facility was developed jointly with the Bonneville Power Administration, and the BPA bears the direct cost of operating and maintaining the dam.

| Generator | Nameplate Capacity (MW) |
|---|---|
| U#1 | 35.0 |
| U#2 | 35.0 |
| Total | 70.0 |

== See also ==
Media related to Cowlitz Falls Hydroelectric Project at Wikimedia Commons

- List of dams in the Columbia River watershed
- List of geographic features in Lewis County, Washington
- List of lakes in Washington
