= Randle, Washington =

Unincorporated community in Washington, United States

- Unincorporated community
- Location within Washington (state) Location within the United States
- Coordinates: 46°32′07″N 121°57′26″W
- Country: United States
- State: Washington
- County: Lewis
- Elevation: 892 ft (272 m)
- Time zone: UTC−8 (PST)
  - Summer (DST): UTC−7 (PDT)
- ZIP code: 98377
- Area code(s): 360, 564
- GNIS feature ID: 1524864

Randle is an unincorporated area in eastern Lewis County, Washington, United States. Randle is located on U.S. Route 12 and is notable as the northeastern access point to the Mount St. Helens Windy Ridge viewpoint, by way of forest service roads that cut through the Gifford Pinchot National Forest.

Randle is located next to the Cowlitz River and is about 4 miles (6.4 km) north of the Cispus River, a tributary of the Cowlitz. The Cowlitz River winds westward through a rural valley in Randle known locally as "Big Bottom Valley," which is reflective of the fact that the valley floor, in certain areas, is "big". The flat, fertile land is, in places, more than 3 miles (4.8 km) wide.

== History ==
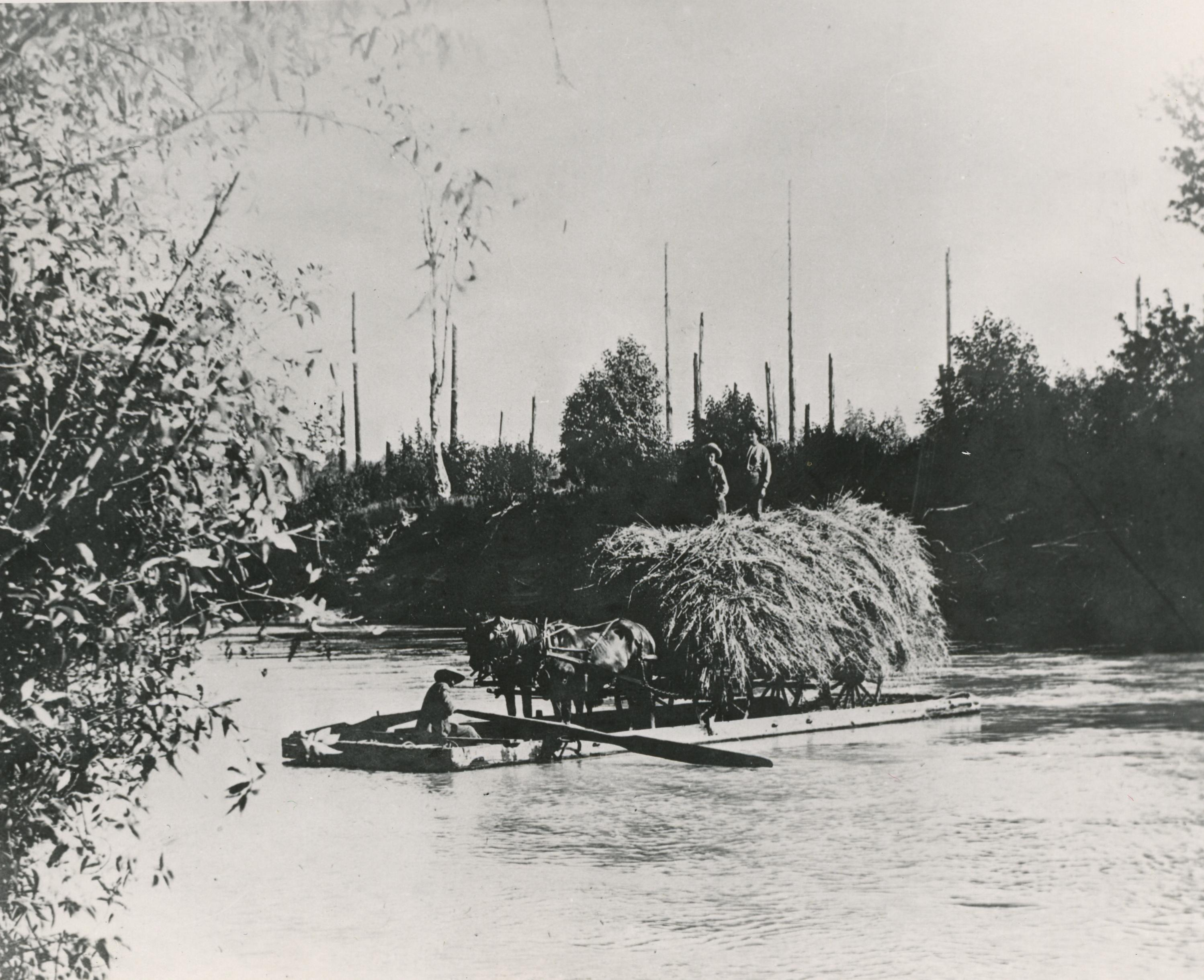
Cowlitz River ferry, c. 1900

William Joerk explored in the area around 1882 and the townsite was officially founded in 1902. One of the first to settle the town was James L. Randles in 1886 who helped deliver mail in the site's infancy and would spearhead the creation of a post office. Randles would pass away in 1920 and be buried in Centralia due to winter conditions at the time of his death. In 2023, his body was ceremoniously reburied next to family members in a Randle cemetery.

=== Post office and etymology ===
An 1889 petition to open a post office for the community was created by James Randles, but it lacked a town name in the paperwork. Due to a clerical decision by the then-existing rules of the Washington Territory, the surname of Randles (excluding the "s") was determined as the moniker for the town.

=== Sexual assault case ===
In 2021, a charge of sexual assault was filed against the rapper and songwriter, Lil Mosey; the incident, occurring in Randle, was reported to have happened in 2020. A trial and acquittal of the musician took place at the Lewis County courthouse in Chehalis in early 2023.

== Geography ==
Randle is the center of the White Pass School District, which, in addition to Randle, covers the small towns of Glenoma, Washington, and Packwood, Washington (its school district jurisdiction includes a vast rural expanse in extreme eastern Lewis County, terminating at the Cascade Mountains and the county border with Yakima County). The community of Randle is located within Census Tract 9719 of Lewis County.

=== Climate ===
This region experiences warm (but not hot) and dry summers, with no average monthly temperatures above 71.6 °F (22.0 °C). According to the Köppen climate classification system, Randle has a warm-summer Mediterranean climate, abbreviated "Csb" on climate maps.

==== Flooding ====
During the 2025 Pacific Northwest floods, Randle was inundated with deep flood waters. On Monday, December 8, the Cowlitz River peaked 5 feet (1.5 m) over the waterway's flood stage; in what is referred to as a "double crest", the river rose again on Wednesday, December 10, reaching 24.17 feet (7.4 m). U.S. Route 12 was underwater and nearby Cora Bridge was closed, further limiting access to the community. Several people, as well as pets, were evacuated from a trailer park.

The highest recorded peak of the Cowlitz River at Randle is 25.2 feet (7.7 m), set in 2006.

== Arts and culture ==
Randle is home to the Randle Ranger Station-Work Center, a complex of rustic buildings built by the Civilian Conservation Corps and is listed on the National Register of Historic Places (NRHP). The North Fork Guard Station No. 1142, another NRHP site, is located near the town.

The Bigfoot 200 ultramarathon ends at the White Pass High School in Randle.

== Economy ==
In 2019, Crystal Geyser Water Company purchased property in Randle and proposed the construction of a water bottling plant. The proposal drew extensive opposition from local residents who were concerned about damage to the Cowlitz River watershed and industrialization of the area. In 2022, Lewis County PUD authorized a deal to acquire the property from Crystal Geyser to expand the adjacent campground and wilderness areas along the Cowlitz River.

== Parks and recreation ==
The community is located northeast of several recreation areas, including Riffe Lake, Taidnapam Park, and Cowlitz Falls Park which is located on the Cispus River near its junction to the reservoir, Lake Scanewa. The Cowlitz Falls Campground, also known as Leonard “Bud” Allen Park, is a 110-acre (45 ha) park under the control of the Lewis County PUD and is situated near the Cowltiz River, southwest of the town center.

== Education ==
The White Pass High School was built in 1951. In 2011, it was demolished and built into a new school.

== Politics ==
Presidential Elections Results
Year	Republican	Democratic	Third parties
2008	56.6% 492	41.3% 359	2.1% 18
2012	56.9% 475	40.6% 339	2.5% 21
2016	61.8% 487	30.5% 240	7.7% 61
2020	68.0% 689	30.7% 311	1.4% 14
2024	67.4% 662	29.3% 288	3.3% 32

The voting information in the table includes the combined votes cast in the Randle East and Randle West precincts only. As this is an unincorporated community, there are no defined bounds, and the precinct may be incongruous with the census boundaries.

The 2020 election included votes for candidates of the Libertarian Party and Green Party. In the 2024 election, there were 5 votes cast for write-in candidates and 19 votes were tallied for Robert F. Kennedy Jr..

== Infrastructure ==
The community is among eight locations that are part of an EV installation project on the White Pass Scenic Byway. The program will stretch from the White Pass Ski Area to Chehalis and is run in partnership with Lewis County PUD, Twin Transit, state government agencies, and local community efforts. The venture began in 2023 from two grants totaling over $1.8 million.

The Timberland Regional Library system built a new 3,400 square feet (320 m^{2}) public library in Randle that formally opened to the public in January 2025. It replaced a previous library location in a rented space.
