= Cispus River =

River in Lewis and Skamania counties, Washington state

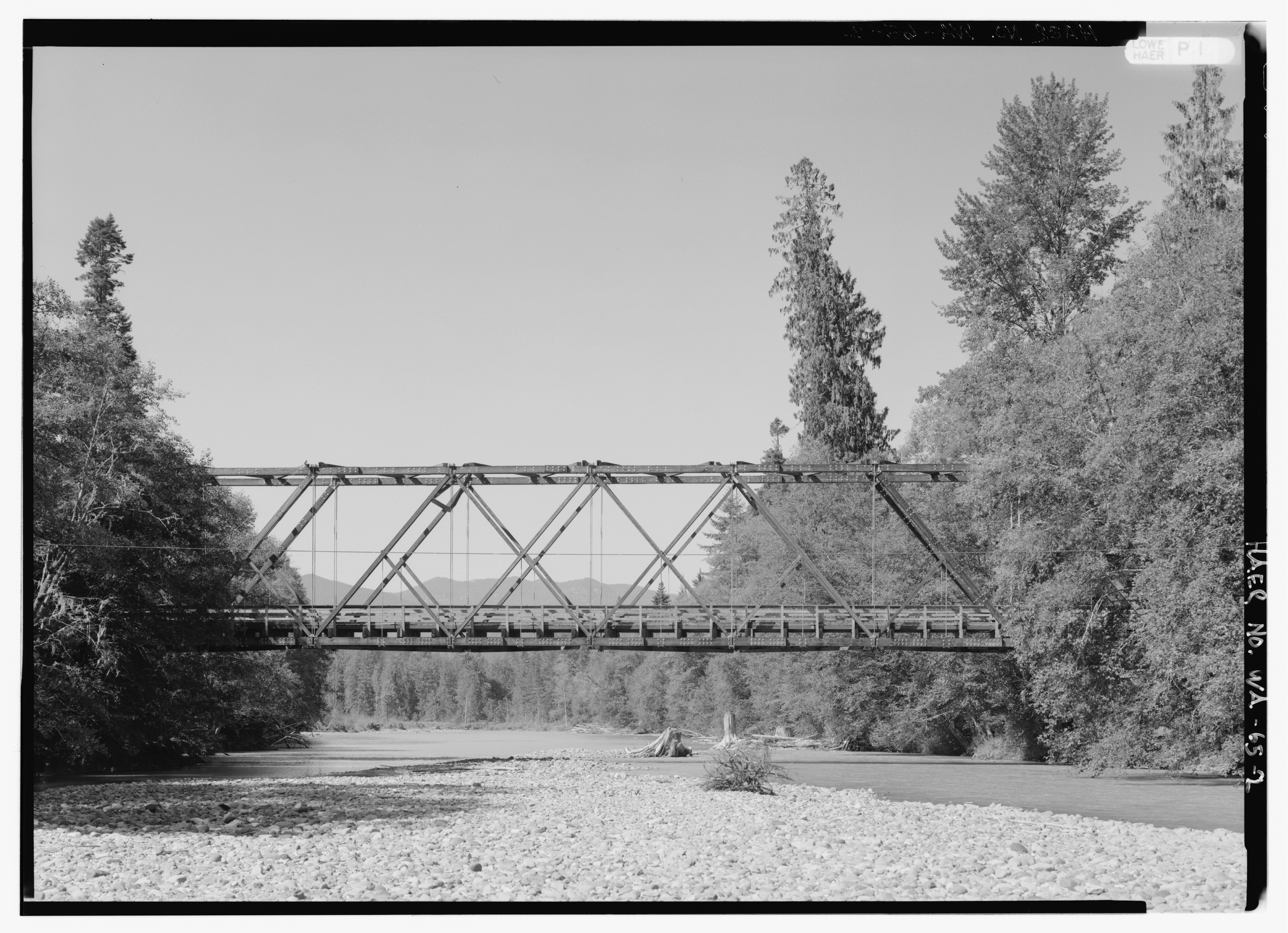
- Bridge at Forest Service Road 2306

- Location of the mouth of the Cispus River in Washington Cispus River (the United States)

Location
- Country: United States
- State: Washington
- County: Lewis, Skamania

Physical characteristics
- Source: Goat Rocks Wilderness
  - location: Cascade Range
  - coordinates: 46°29′41″N 121°25′45″W
- Mouth: Cowlitz River
  - location: Lake Scanewa
  - coordinates: 46°28′35″N 122°5′39″W
  - elevation: 833 ft (254 m)
- Length: 54 mi (87 km)
- Discharge
  - location: river mile 17.4 near Randle
  - average: 1,001 cu ft/s (28.3 m^{3}/s)
  - minimum: 165 cu ft/s (4.7 m^{3}/s)
  - maximum: 9,800 cu ft/s (280 m^{3}/s)

The Cispus River is about 54 miles (87 km) long and flows into the Cowlitz River at Lake Scanewa in the Cascade Range of Washington. Its tributaries drain most of south-central and southeastern Lewis County, extreme northeast Skamania County, and some of western Yakima County.

== History ==
Indigenous residents on the Cispus River were known as the cispaclama. The river was the location of a site known to the Upper Cowlitz tribe as "Yuyutla". Translated as "person who shouts", the location was used by various other Native American groups in the region for thousands of years. Archeological studies started in the late 20th century provided evidence of tool building and hunting at the site which is thought to be located near Randle on a trail leading from a nearby campground. Research also included the find of a long-serving communal shelter and work site at Layser Cave.

German settlers in the mid-1800s founded the homestead community of Rhine, named after the river in Germany, which was located on the river near Cowlitz Falls. The community, which became a ghost town, renamed itself to Cispus. The name is from a mythical Upper Cowlitz warrior.

== Course ==
The main stem begins in Lewis County in a high, glacial valley to the north of Snowgrass Flats in the Goat Rocks Wilderness, located on the Gifford Pinchot National Forest. From here the river flows in a looped, southwesterly direction into Skamania County and takes on the waters of several important headwater tributaries such as Walupt Creek.

About 40 miles (64 km) from its mouth, the Cispus River receives Muddy Fork from the left. Muddy Fork starts 7 miles (11 km) from this junction, at Mount Adams' Lava Glacier and is named for the glacial debris and silt in the water which give the river a muddy appearance. The Cispus River flows through a heavily forested valley, much of the forest regrown after the Cispus Burn, which occurred the first decade of the 20th century and consumed most of the lower drainage.

The rushing Canyon Creek enters the river originating high on the slopes of Mount Adams. A few miles down the North Fork Cispus enters the main branch about 20 miles (32 km) from its start. From here on, the Cispus River flows westerly, passing campgrounds and trails in the Gifford Pinchot National Forest. Two tributaries, Yellowjacket and McCoy Creeks, flow into the river from the south about midway though its course. Beyond here, the river passes beneath Tower Rock, a prominent quartz diorite monolith on the south side of the river. Soon after this the river leaves the Gifford Pinchot National Forest and enters the Weyerhaeuser Cowlitz Tree Farm. The Cispus River ends its course entering the Cowlitz River at Lake Scanewa, just upstream from Cowlitz Falls and Riffe Lake near the flooded town of Kosmos.

== Ecology and environment ==
The watershed is populated by hundreds of trees known as "basket trees", where the bark was used by indigenous people to create a variety of containers. Near Randle, the Cispus watershed contains old-growth Douglas fir forests, hosting trees up to 600-years old. Other timber species include alder, cedar, hemlock, and maple.

There is a stream flow monitoring station on the river which sends its data live to the United States Geological Survey (USGS).

== Parks and recreation ==
The Cispus is host to the Cowlitz Falls Park, a day use area situated near its junction with Lake Scanewa. Whitewater rafting also takes place on the Cispus River.

Cispus Learning Center, an outdoor camp for children, is located adjacent to the Cispus River about 10 miles (16 km) south of Randle.

== See also ==
- List of geographic features in Lewis County, Washington
- List of Washington rivers
- List of tributaries of the Columbia River
